= 2001 Nottingham Open =

- Date: 18–24 June
- Edition: 12th
- Category: International Series
- Draw: 32S / 16D
- Prize money: $375,000
- Surface: Grass / outdoor
- Location: Nottingham, United Kingdom
- Venue: Nottingham Tennis Centre

Champions

Singles
- (Sweden) Thomas Johansson

Doubles
- (United States) Donald Johnson / (United States) Jared Palmer
← 2000 ·	Nottingham Open	· 2002 →

The 2001 Nottingham Open (known for sponsorship reasons as the Samsung Open) was a men's tennis tournament played on grass courts at the Nottingham Tennis Centre in Nottingham in the United Kingdom and was part of the International Series of the 2001 ATP Tour. It was the 12th edition of the tournament and ran from 18 June through 24 June 2001. Third-seeded Thomas Johansson won the singles title.

== Finals ==
=== Singles ===
(Sweden) Thomas Johansson defeated (Israel) Harel Levy 7–5, 6–3

- It was Johansson's 2nd title of the year and the 6th of his career.

=== Doubles ===
(United States) Donald Johnson / (United States) Jared Palmer defeated (Australia) Paul Hanley / (Australia) Andrew Kratzmann 6–4, 6–2

- It was Johnson's 5th title of the year and the 19th of his career. It was Palmer's 4th title of the year and the 21st of his career.
