= 2002 Nottingham Open =

- Date: 17–23 June
- Edition: 13th
- Category: International Series
- Draw: 32S / 16D
- Prize money: $356,000
- Surface: Grass / outdoor
- Location: Nottingham, United Kingdom
- Venue: Nottingham Tennis Centre

Champions

Singles
- (Sweden) Jonas Björkman

Doubles
- (United States) Mike Bryan / (The Bahamas) Mark Knowles
← 2001 ·	Nottingham Open	· 2003 →

The 2002 Nottingham Open (known for sponsorship reasons and the Samsung Open) was a men's tennis tournament played on grass courts at the Nottingham Tennis Centre in Nottingham in the United Kingdom and was part of the International Series of the 2002 ATP Tour. It was the 13th edition of the tournament and ran from 17 June through 23 June 2002. Jonas Björkman won the singles title.

== Finals ==
=== Singles ===
(Sweden) Jonas Björkman defeated (Australia) Wayne Arthurs 6–2, 6–7^{(5–7)}, 6–2

- It was Björkman's 3rd title of the year and the 32nd of his career.

=== Doubles ===
(United States) Mike Bryan / (The Bahamas) Mark Knowles defeated (United States) Donald Johnson / (United States) Jared Palmer 0–6, 7–6^{(7–3)}, 6–4

- It was Bryan's 3rd title of the year and the 7th of his career. It was Knowles' 5th title of the year and the 22nd of his career.
