= 2003 Nottingham Open =

- Date: 16–22 June
- Edition: 14th
- Category: International Series
- Draw: 32S / 16D
- Prize money: $355,000
- Surface: Grass / outdoor
- Location: Nottingham, United Kingdom
- Venue: Nottingham Tennis Centre

Champions

Singles
- (United Kingdom) Greg Rusedski

Doubles
- (United States) Bob Bryan / (United States) Mike Bryan
← 2002 ·	Nottingham Open	· 2004 →

The 2003 Nottingham Open (known for sponsorship reasons as the Samsung open) was a men's tennis tournament played on grass courts at the Nottingham Tennis Centre in Nottingham in the United Kingdom and was part of the International Series of the 2003 ATP Tour. The tournament ran from 16 June through 22 June 2003. Greg Rusedski won the singles title.

== Finals ==
=== Singles ===
(United Kingdom) Greg Rusedski defeated (United States) Mardy Fish 6–3, 6–2

- It was Rusedski's only title of the year and the 16th of his career.

=== Doubles ===
(United States) Bob Bryan / (United States) Mike Bryan defeated (Australia) Joshua Eagle / (United States) Jared Palmer 7–6^{(7–3)}, 4–6, 7–6^{(7–4)}

- It was Bob Bryan's 3rd title of the year and the 12th of his career. It was Mike Bryan's 3rd title of the year and the 14th of his career.
