= 2005 Nottingham Open – Singles =

Singles
- 2005 Nottingham Open

Final
- Champion: (France) Richard Gasquet
- Runner-up: (Belarus) Max Mirnyi
- Score: 6–2, 6–3

Details
- Draw: 32
- Seeds: 8

Events
Singles	Doubles
← 2004 ·	Nottingham Open	· 2006 →

Paradorn Srichaphan was the defending champion, but lost in the quarterfinals this year.

Richard Gasquet won the title, defeating Max Mirnyi 6–2, 6–3 in the final.

== Seeds ==
1. (Croatia) Ivan Ljubičić (second round)
2. (Sweden) Thomas Johansson (quarterfinals)
3. (Slovakia) Dominik Hrbatý (second round)
4. (France) Richard Gasquet (champion)
5. (United States) Taylor Dent (semifinals)
6. (Thailand) Paradorn Srichaphan (quarterfinals)
7. (Belgium) Olivier Rochus (semifinals)
8. (Belarus) Max Mirnyi (final)

== Draw ==
=== Key ===
- Q = Qualifier
- WC = Wild card
- LL = Lucky loser
- Alt = Alternate
- SE = Special exempt
- PR = Protected ranking
- ITF = ITF entry
- JE = Junior exempt
- w/o = Walkover
- r = Retired
- d = Defaulted
- SR = Special ranking

=== Finals ===
Semifinals
7	(Belgium) Olivier Rochus	4	5
8	(Belarus) Max Mirnyi	6	7
4	(France) Richard Gasquet	6	6
5	(United States) Taylor Dent	4	2

Final
8	(Belarus) Max Mirnyi	2	3
4	(France) Richard Gasquet	6	6

=== Top half ===
First round
1	(Croatia) I Ljubičić	6^{5}	6	7^{10}
(Romania) V Hănescu	7^{7}	3	6^{8}
(Croatia) I Karlović	6	6
(Russia) I Andreev	4	4
(France) G Monfils	2	6	3
(Slovakia) K Beck	6	2	6
(United States) K Kim	7^{9}	6^{3}	6^{6}
7	(Belgium) O Rochus	6^{7}	7^{7}	7^{8}
3	(Slovakia) D Hrbatý	6	6
(United States) R Ginepri	2	3
(Denmark) K Carlsen	7^{7}	4	7^{7}
Q	(India) H Mankad	6^{5}	6	6^{5}
(Spain) A Martín	5	6^{1}
(South Korea) H-t Lee	7	7^{7}
(Armenia) S Sargsian	2	0
8	(Belarus) M Mirnyi	6	6

Second round
1	(Croatia) I Ljubičić	1	6	6^{1}
(Croatia) I Karlović	6	3	7^{7}
(Slovakia) K Beck	4	3
7	(Belgium) O Rochus	6	6
3	(Slovakia) D Hrbatý	4	4
(Denmark) K Carlsen	6	6
(South Korea) H-t Lee	1	4
8	(Belarus) M Mirnyi	6	6

Quarterfinals
(Croatia) I Karlović	6^{0}	7^{7}	4
7	(Belgium) O Rochus	7^{7}	6^{3}	6
(Denmark) K Carlsen	6^{2}	4
8	(Belarus) M Mirnyi	7^{7}	6

Semifinals
7	(Belgium) O Rochus	4	5
8	(Belarus) M Mirnyi	6	7

=== Bottom half ===
First round
6	(Thailand) P Srichaphan	6	6
Q	(United Kingdom) M Hilton	3	2
(Brazil) R Mello	2	1
Q	(Czech Republic) J Vacek	6	6
WC	(United Kingdom) J Marray	6	6
WC	(United Kingdom) A Mackin	2	3
(Czech Republic) T Zíb	6^{0}	2
4	(France) R Gasquet	7^{7}	6
5	(United States) T Dent	6	6
PR	(Germany) A Popp	3	3
Q	(United States) T Rettenmaier	4	6	7^{7}
(Serbia and Montenegro) J Tipsarević	6	4	6^{4}
(Spain) S Ventura	3	2
(Czech Republic) T Berdych	6	6
LL	(Russia) D Tursunov	6^{0}	3
2	(Sweden) T Johansson	7^{7}	6

Second round
6	(Thailand) P Srichaphan	7^{7}	7^{7}
Q	(Czech Republic) J Vacek	6^{3}	6^{4}
WC	(United Kingdom) J Marray	4	1
4	(France) R Gasquet	6	6
5	(United States) T Dent	6	1	6
Q	(United States) T Rettenmaier	3	6	3
(Czech Republic) T Berdych	6^{5}	6^{8}
2	(Sweden) T Johansson	7^{7}	7^{10}

Quarterfinals
6	(Thailand) P Srichaphan	3	6	0
4	(France) R Gasquet	6	4	6
5	(United States) T Dent	6	1
2	(Sweden) T Johansson	3	0^{r}

Semifinals
4	(France) R Gasquet	6	6
5	(United States) T Dent	4	2
