= 2002 Nottingham Open – Singles =

Singles
- 2002 Nottingham Open

Final
- Champion: (Sweden) Jonas Björkman
- Runner-up: (Australia) Wayne Arthurs
- Score: 6–2, 6–7^{(5–7)}, 6–2

Details
- Draw: 32
- Seeds: 8

Events
Singles	Doubles
- Nottingham Open

Thomas Johansson was the defending champion but did not compete that year.

Jonas Björkman won in the final 6–2, 6–7^{(5–7)}, 6–2 against Wayne Arthurs.

== Seeds ==
1. (United States) Andy Roddick (first round)
2. (France) Fabrice Santoro (quarterfinals)
3. (United Kingdom) Greg Rusedski (semifinals)
4. (Finland) Jarkko Nieminen (first round)
5. (Austria) Stefan Koubek (second round)
6. (Switzerland) Michel Kratochvil (semifinals)
7. (Sweden) Magnus Larsson (quarterfinals)
8. (Italy) Davide Sanguinetti (second round)

== Draw ==
Key

- Q = Qualifier
- WC = Wild card
- LL = Lucky loser
- Alt = Alternate
- ITF = ITF entry
- PR = Protected ranking
- SR = Special ranking
- SE = Special exempt
- JE = Junior exempt
- JR = Junior Accelerator Programme entrant
- CO = College Accelerator Programme entrant
- NG = Next Gen Accelerator Program entrant
- w/o = Walkover
- r = Retired
- d = Defaulted

=== Finals ===
Semifinals
(Sweden) Jonas Björkman	6	6
WC/3	(United Kingdom) Greg Rusedski	3	4
(Australia) Wayne Arthurs	7^{7}	6
6	(Switzerland) Michel Kratochvil	6^{5}	2

Final
(Sweden) Jonas Björkman	6	6^{5}	6
(Australia) Wayne Arthurs	2	7^{7}	2

=== Top half ===
First round
1	(United States) A Roddick	5	5
(Sweden) J Björkman	7	7
(Israel) H Levy	6	3	2^{r}
(Czech Republic) J Vacek	4	6	5
(Russia) A Stoliarov	6	3	6
(Georgia (country)) I Labadze	3	6	2
(Spain) A Portas	6^{8}	4
5	(Austria) S Koubek	7^{10}	6
WC/3	(United Kingdom) G Rusedski	4	6	6
Q	(Australia) T Reid	6	2	1
(Romania) A Voinea	6	7^{7}
(Brazil) A Sá	1	6^{3}
(Chile) N Massú	7	6
(United States) C Mamiit	5	2
Q	(South Africa) W Moodie	4	5
7	(Sweden) M Larsson	6	7

Second round
(Sweden) J Björkman	7	7^{7}
(Czech Republic) J Vacek	5	6^{5}
(Russia) A Stoliarov	6	6
5	(Austria) S Koubek	4	4
WC/3	(United Kingdom) G Rusedski	6	6
(Romania) A Voinea	3	2
(Chile) N Massú	6^{5}	4
7	(Sweden) M Larsson	7^{7}	6

Quarterfinals
(Sweden) J Björkman	6	6
(Russia) A Stoliarov	1	0
WC/3	(United Kingdom) G Rusedski	6^{4}	7^{7}	6
7	(Sweden) M Larsson	7^{7}	6^{3}	3

Semifinals
(Sweden) J Björkman	6	6
WC/3	(United Kingdom) G Rusedski	3	4

=== Bottom half ===
First round
8	(Italy) D Sanguinetti	6	7
Q	(South Africa) J Coetzee	4	5
(Australia) W Arthurs	7^{9}	6^{4}	6
(Armenia) S Sargsian	6^{7}	7^{7}	2
(Germany) N Kiefer	6	7^{7}
Q	(United States) M Bryan	0	6^{4}
WC	(United Kingdom) A Parmar	6	6
4	(Finland) J Nieminen	3	2
6	(Switzerland) M Kratochvil	7^{7}	6
WC	(United Kingdom) J Delgado	6^{5}	3
(Austria) M Hipfl	0	r
(Denmark) K Pless	6
(France) M Llodra	6	6
(United States) T Dent	3	4
(Brazil) A Simoni	1	4
2	(France) F Santoro	6	6

Second round
8	(Italy) D Sanguinetti	6	6^{3}	5
(Australia) W Arthurs	4	7^{7}	7
(Germany) N Kiefer	6^{4}	2^{r}
WC	(United Kingdom) A Parmar	7^{7}	4
6	(Switzerland) M Kratochvil	6	6
(Denmark) K Pless	2	3
(France) M Llodra	4	4
2	(France) F Santoro	6	6

Quarterfinals
(Australia) W Arthurs	6^{3}	6	6
WC	(United Kingdom) A Parmar	7^{7}	2	4
6	(Switzerland) M Kratochvil	6	6
2	(France) F Santoro	1	3

Semifinals
(Australia) W Arthurs	7^{7}	6
6	(Switzerland) M Kratochvil	6^{5}	2
