= 2003 Nottingham Open – Doubles =

Doubles
- 2003 Nottingham Open

Final
- Champion: (United States) Bob Bryan (United States) Mike Bryan
- Runner-up: (Australia) Joshua Eagle (United States) Jared Palmer
- Score: 7–6^{(7–3)}, 4–6, 7–6^{(7–4)}

Details
- Draw: 16
- Seeds: 4

Events
Singles	Doubles
- Nottingham Open

Mike Bryan and Mark Knowles were the defending champions but only Bryan competed that year with his brother Bob.

The Bryans won in the final 7–6^{(7–3)}, 4–6, 7–6^{(7–4)} against Joshua Eagle and Jared Palmer.

== Seeds ==
1. (United States) Bob Bryan / (United States) Mike Bryan (champions)
2. (India) Mahesh Bhupathi / (Australia) Todd Woodbridge (first round)
3. (Australia) Joshua Eagle / (United States) Jared Palmer (final)
4. (South Africa) Chris Haggard / (South Africa) Robbie Koenig (semifinals)

== Draw ==
Key

- Q = Qualifier
- WC = Wild card
- LL = Lucky loser
- Alt = Alternate
- ITF = ITF entry
- PR = Protected ranking
- SR = Special ranking
- SE = Special exempt
- JE = Junior exempt
- JR = Junior Accelerator Programme entrant
- CO = College Accelerator Programme entrant
- NG = Next Gen Accelerator Program entrant
- w/o = Walkover
- r = Retired
- d = Defaulted

First round
1	(United States) B Bryan (United States) M Bryan	6	6
(Argentina) L Arnold (Argentina) M Hood	0	3
(The Bahamas) M Merklein (United States) B Vahaly	4	2
(United States) V Spadea (United States) J Tarango	6	6
4	(South Africa) C Haggard (South Africa) R Koenig	7^{7}	6
WC	(United Kingdom) M Lee (United Kingdom) A Murray	6^{4}	4
(United States) M Fish (Serbia and Montenegro) N Zimonjić	7	7
(Morocco) Y El Aynaoui (Belgium) T Vanhoudt	5	5
(South Africa) D Adams (Australia) A Kratzmann	6	6
(United States) G Oliver (Zimbabwe) K Ullyett	3	2
(South Korea) H-T Lee (Belarus) V Voltchkov	5	4
3	(Australia) J Eagle (United States) J Palmer	7	6
(Finland) J Nieminen (Belgium) O Rochus	6	7^{7}
(Australia) P Hanley (Australia) N Healey	4	6^{3}
WC	(United Kingdom) J Delgado (United Kingdom) A Parmar	7^{7}	4	7^{7}
2	(India) M Bhupathi (Australia) T Woodbridge	6^{5}	6	6^{2}

Quarterfinals
1	(United States) B Bryan (United States) M Bryan	w/o
(United States) V Spadea (United States) J Tarango
4	(South Africa) C Haggard (South Africa) R Koenig	4	6	6
(United States) M Fish (Serbia and Montenegro) N Zimonjić	6	3	4
(South Africa) D Adams (Australia) A Kratzmann	6^{3}	6^{5}
3	(Australia) J Eagle (United States) J Palmer	7^{7}	7^{7}
(Finland) J Nieminen (Belgium) O Rochus	6
WC	(United Kingdom) J Delgado (United Kingdom) A Parmar	4	r

Semifinals
1	(United States) B Bryan (United States) M Bryan	6	6
4	(South Africa) C Haggard (South Africa) R Koenig	2	1
3	(Australia) J Eagle (United States) J Palmer	4	6	6
(Finland) J Nieminen (Belgium) O Rochus	6	1	4

Final
1	(United States) B Bryan (United States) M Bryan	7^{7}	4	7^{7}
3	(Australia) J Eagle (United States) J Palmer	6^{3}	6	6^{4}
