= 2004 Nottingham Open – Singles =

Singles
- 2004 Nottingham Open

Final
- Champion: (Thailand) Paradorn Srichaphan
- Runner-up: (Sweden) Thomas Johansson
- Score: 1–6, 7–6^{(7–4)}, 6–3

Details
- Draw: 32
- Seeds: 8

Events
Singles	Doubles
- Nottingham Open

Greg Rusedski was the defending champion, but lost in the quarterfinals this year.

Paradorn Srichaphan won the title, defeating Thomas Johansson 1–6, 7–6^{(7–4)}, 6–3 in the final.

== Seeds ==
1. (Thailand) Paradorn Srichaphan (champion)
2. (United States) ~~Mardy Fish~~ (withdrew because of a shoulder injury)
3. (Sweden) Jonas Björkman (second round)
4. (Belarus) Max Mirnyi (first round)
5. (United States) Vincent Spadea (second round)
6. (United States) Taylor Dent (semifinals)
7. (Morocco) Hicham Arazi (quarterfinals)
8. (Austria) Jürgen Melzer (first round)

== Draw ==
Key

- Q = Qualifier
- WC = Wild card
- LL = Lucky loser
- Alt = Alternate
- ITF = ITF entry
- PR = Protected ranking
- SR = Special ranking
- SE = Special exempt
- JE = Junior exempt
- JR = Junior Accelerator Programme entrant
- CO = College Accelerator Programme entrant
- NG = Next Gen Accelerator Program entrant
- w/o = Walkover
- r = Retired
- d = Defaulted

=== Finals ===
Semifinals
1	(Thailand) Paradorn Srichaphan	6	6
(Sweden) Robin Söderling	2	2
Q	(Sweden) Thomas Johansson	7^{7}	6
6	(United States) Taylor Dent	6^{4}	1

Final
1	(Thailand) Paradorn Srichaphan	1	7^{7}	6
Q	(Sweden) Thomas Johansson	6	6^{4}	3

=== Top half ===
First round
1	(Thailand) P Srichaphan	6	7
(Belgium) G Elseneer	3	5
(South Africa) W Ferreira	4	6	7^{7}
(Spain) A Martín	6	4	6^{5}
(South Africa) W Moodie	4	2
(United States) J-M Gambill	6	6
Q	(United Kingdom) L Childs	3	3
7	(Morocco) H Arazi	6	6
3	(Sweden) J Björkman	7^{7}	6
Q	(Pakistan) A-u-H Qureshi	6^{5}	3
(Spain) D Ferrer	6^{5}	6	2
(Sweden) R Söderling	7^{7}	3	6
WC	(United Kingdom) J Marray	7^{7}	2	6
(Australia) W Arthurs	6^{4}	6	3
(Brazil) F Saretta	7^{7}	7^{7}
8	(Austria) J Melzer	6^{4}	6^{3}

Second round
1	(Thailand) P Srichaphan	4	6	7
(South Africa) W Ferreira	6	3	5
(United States) J-M Gambill	6^{3}	3
7	(Morocco) H Arazi	7^{7}	6
3	(Sweden) J Björkman	3	4
(Sweden) R Söderling	6	6
WC	(United Kingdom) J Marray	7^{7}	6^{1}	2
(Brazil) F Saretta	6^{2}	7^{7}	6

Quarterfinals
1	(Thailand) P Srichaphan	6	6
7	(Morocco) H Arazi	3	4
(Sweden) R Söderling	6	6
(Brazil) F Saretta	3	4

Semifinals
1	(Thailand) P Srichaphan	6	6
(Sweden) R Söderling	2	2

=== Bottom half ===
First round
5	(United States) V Spadea	6	7
(France) G Carraz	3	5
WC	(United Kingdom) G Rusedski	2	7^{7}	6
(Slovakia) K Kučera	6	6^{4}	3
(Belgium) O Rochus	6	6
(Armenia) S Sargsian	3	3
Q	(Sweden) T Johansson	2	6	6
4	(Belarus) M Mirnyi	6	1	4
6	(United States) T Dent	6	6
(Georgia (country)) I Labadze	2	2
(Sweden) J Johansson	6^{5}	4
Q	(United Kingdom) A Bogdanovic	7^{7}	6
WC	(United Kingdom) A Parmar	1	6	7
(Belgium) X Malisse	6	4	5
(Romania) V Hănescu	4	6	6
LL	(Germany) S Fitz	6	1	4

Second round
5	(United States) V Spadea	6^{3}	6	1
WC	(United Kingdom) G Rusedski	7^{7}	4	6
(Belgium) O Rochus	4	6^{5}
Q	(Sweden) T Johansson	6	7^{7}
6	(United States) T Dent	6	7
Q	(United Kingdom) A Bogdanovic	2	5
WC	(United Kingdom) A Parmar	4	5
(Romania) V Hănescu	6	7

Quarterfinals
WC	(United Kingdom) G Rusedski	6	5	6^{5}
Q	(Sweden) T Johansson	4	7	7^{7}
6	(United States) T Dent	5	7^{7}	7^{9}
(Romania) V Hănescu	7	6^{2}	6^{7}

Semifinals
Q	(Sweden) T Johansson	7^{7}	6
6	(United States) T Dent	6^{4}	1
