= 2003 Nottingham Open – Singles =

Singles
- 2003 Nottingham Open

Final
- Champion: (United Kingdom) Greg Rusedski
- Runner-up: (United States) Mardy Fish
- Score: 6–3, 6–2

Details
- Draw: 32
- Seeds: 8

Events
Singles	Doubles
- Nottingham Open

Jonas Björkman was the defending champion but lost in the semifinals to Mardy Fish.

Greg Rusedski won in the final 6–3, 6–2 against Fish.

== Seeds ==
1. (Morocco) Younes El Aynaoui (second round)
2. (Russia) Mikhail Youzhny (first round)
3. (Finland) Jarkko Nieminen (first round)
4. (United States) Vince Spadea (first round)
5. (United States) Jan-Michael Gambill (first round)
6. (Belarus) Max Mirnyi (second round)
7. (United States) Taylor Dent (quarterfinals, withdrew because of a back injury)
8. (United States) Mardy Fish (final)

== Draw ==
Key

- Q = Qualifier
- WC = Wild card
- LL = Lucky loser
- Alt = Alternate
- ITF = ITF entry
- PR = Protected ranking
- SR = Special ranking
- SE = Special exempt
- JE = Junior exempt
- JR = Junior Accelerator Programme entrant
- CO = College Accelerator Programme entrant
- NG = Next Gen Accelerator Program entrant
- w/o = Walkover
- r = Retired
- d = Defaulted

=== Finals ===
Semifinals
Q	(Morocco) Hicham Arazi	5	5
(United Kingdom) Greg Rusedski	7	7
8	(United States) Mardy Fish	6^{5}	6	6
(Sweden) Jonas Björkman	7^{7}	3	4

Final
(United Kingdom) Greg Rusedski	6	6
8	(United States) Mardy Fish	3	2

=== Top half ===
First round
1	(Morocco) Y El Aynaoui	7^{7}	6
(Germany) A Waske	6^{2}	4
Q	(United States) B Bryan	6^{17}	5
(Australia) W Arthurs	7^{19}	7
Q	(Morocco) H Arazi	6	3	6
(Armenia) S Sargsian	4	6	3
(United States) R Ginepri	3	4
6	(Belarus) M Mirnyi	6	6
3	(Finland) J Nieminen	4	4
(United Kingdom) G Rusedski	6	6
(Belgium) O Rochus	6	4
(Georgia (country)) I Labadze	0	1^{r}
(United States) J Gimelstob	1	5
(Belarus) V Voltchkov	6	7
WC	(United Kingdom) A Bogdanovic	6	5	6
5	(United States) J-M Gambill	4	7	4

Second round
1	(Morocco) Y El Aynaoui	4	6^{6}
(Australia) W Arthurs	6	7^{8}
Q	(Morocco) H Arazi	7^{7}	6
6	(Belarus) M Mirnyi	6^{4}	2
(United Kingdom) G Rusedski	6	6
(Belgium) O Rochus	4	1
(Belarus) V Voltchkov	6	6
WC	(United Kingdom) A Bogdanovic	4	2

Quarterfinals
(Australia) W Arthurs	4	3
Q	(Morocco) H Arazi	6	6
(United Kingdom) G Rusedski	4	7^{7}	7^{7}
(Belarus) V Voltchkov	6	6^{4}	6^{4}

Semifinals
Q	(Morocco) H Arazi	5	5
(United Kingdom) G Rusedski	7	7

=== Bottom half ===
First round
8	(United States) M Fish	6	3	6
(South Korea) H-T Lee	4	6	1
(Austria) S Koubek	4	3
(Switzerland) M Kratochvil	6	6
(Brazil) A Sá	6^{4}	7^{7}	7^{7}
WC	(United Kingdom) J Delgado	7^{7}	6^{2}	6^{4}
(Germany) A Popp	7	6
4	(United States) V Spadea	5	4
7	(United States) T Dent	6	6
(United States) B Vahaly	3	4
Q	(United Kingdom) J Marray	2	4
Q	(Serbia and Montenegro) N Zimonjić	6	6
WC	(United Kingdom) A Parmar	6	7^{7}
(France) P-H Mathieu	4	6^{4}
(Sweden) J Björkman	6	6
2	(Russia) M Youzhny	2	0

Second round
8	(United States) M Fish	6	6
(Switzerland) M Kratochvil	3	4
(Brazil) A Sá	6^{4}	6	3
(Germany) A Popp	7^{7}	3	6
7	(United States) T Dent	7^{7}	6
(Serbia and Montenegro) N Zimonjić	6^{2}	4
WC	(United Kingdom) A Parmar	6^{5}	2
(Sweden) J Björkman	7^{7}	6

Quarterfinals
8	(United States) M Fish	4	7^{7}	6
(Germany) A Popp	6	6^{4}	4
7	(United States) T Dent
(Sweden) J Björkman	w/o

Semifinals
8	(United States) M Fish	6^{5}	6	6
(Sweden) J Björkman	7^{7}	3	4
