= University of Nottingham tram stop =

Nottingham Express Transit tram stop

University of Nottingham
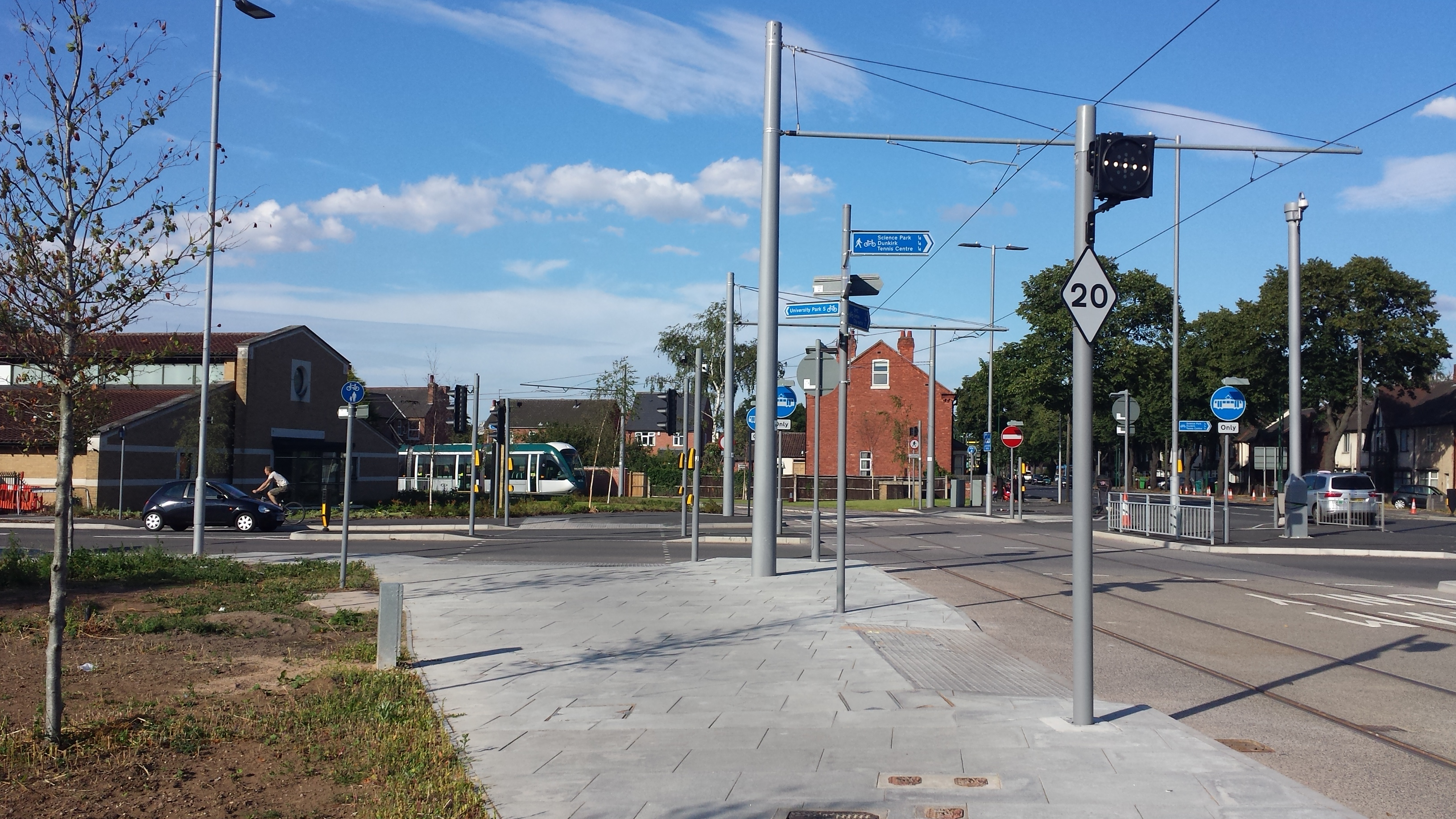

General information
- Location: University of Nottingham, City of Nottingham; England
- Coordinates: 52°56′15″N 1°11′17″W
- System: Nottingham Express Transit tram stop
- Owner: Nottingham Express Transit
- Operator: Nottingham Express Transit
- Line: 1
- Platforms: 2
- Tracks: 2

Construction
- Structure type: At grade; on roadside reserved track
- Accessible: Step-free access to platform

Key dates
- 25 August 2015: Opened

Services
Preceding station	NET	Following station
Queen's Medical Centre towards Hucknall	Line 1	University Boulevard towards Toton Lane
Location
- Location within Nottinghamshire

University of Nottingham is a tram stop on the Nottingham Express Transit (NET) network in the English city of Nottingham and adjacent to the University Park Campus of the University of Nottingham. It is situated on reserved track between University Boulevard (A6005) and the campus, and comprises a pair of side platforms flanking the tracks. The stop is on line 1 of the NET, from Hucknall via the city centre to Beeston and Chilwell. Trams run at frequencies that vary between 4 and 8 trams per hour, depending on the day and time of day.

From the Chilwell direction, trams approach this stop along reserved track on the south side of University Boulevard, crossing the boulevard on a traffic light controlled crossing immediately before the stop, which lies parallel to the north side of the boulevard. Heading towards the city centre and Hucknell, the trams curve around the back of the Djanogly Art Gallery before climbing a ramp to reach the viaduct to the Queen's Medical Centre tram stop.

The tram stop is also adjacent to the Nottingham Tennis Centre, and serves the annual Nottingham Open tennis tournament.

The University of Nottingham stop opened on 25 August 2015, along with the rest of NET's phase two.
