= 2005 Nottingham Open – Doubles =

Doubles
- 2005 Nottingham Open

Final
- Champions: (Israel) Jonathan Erlich (Israel) Andy Ram
- Runners-up: (Sweden) Simon Aspelin (Australia) Todd Perry
- Score: 4–6, 6–3, 7–5

Details
- Draw: 16
- Seeds: 4

Events
Singles	Doubles
- Nottingham Open

Paul Hanley and Todd Woodbridge were the defending champions, but Woodbridge did not participate this year. Hanley partnered Brian MacPhie, losing in the quarterfinals.

Jonathan Erlich and Andy Ram won the title, defeating Simon Aspelin and Todd Perry 4–6, 6–3, 7–5 in the final.

== Seeds ==
1. (Sweden) Simon Aspelin / (Australia) Todd Perry (final)
2. (Israel) Jonathan Erlich / (Israel) Andy Ram (champions)
3. (United States) Graydon Oliver / (United States) Jared Palmer (semifinals)
4. (Australia) Paul Hanley / (United States) Brian MacPhie (quarterfinals)

== Draw ==
Key

- Q = Qualifier
- WC = Wild card
- LL = Lucky loser
- Alt = Alternate
- ITF = ITF entry
- PR = Protected ranking
- SR = Special ranking
- SE = Special exempt
- JE = Junior exempt
- JR = Junior Accelerator Programme entrant
- CO = College Accelerator Programme entrant
- NG = Next Gen Accelerator Program entrant
- w/o = Walkover
- r = Retired
- d = Defaulted

=== Draw ===
First round
1	(Sweden) S Aspelin (Australia) T Perry	6	6
(Slovakia) D Hrbatý (Czech Republic) P Pála	4	4
(Czech Republic) T Berdych (Czech Republic) T Zíb	7^{7}	3	7^{7}
(South Africa) J Coetzee (Brazil) R Mello	6^{2}	6	6^{4}
3	(United States) G Oliver (United States) J Palmer	6	6
WC	(United Kingdom) D Kiernan (United Kingdom) J Marray	4	2
Alt	(South Africa) C Haggard (Argentina) S Prieto	4	6	6
WC	(United Kingdom) R Barker (United Kingdom) W Barker	6	3	1
Alt	(Australia) A Fisher (Spain) S Ventura	6	3	4
Alt	(Slovakia) K Beck (Czech Republic) J Levinský	2	6	6
(United States) K Kim (South Korea) H-t Lee	7	6^{5}	4
4	(Australia) P Hanley (United States) B MacPhie	5	7^{7}	6
(Russia) I Andreev (Spain) A Martín	6	7^{7}
(United States) R Ginepri (Russia) D Tursunov	4	6^{2}
(France) G Monfils (Belgium) O Rochus	4	2
2	(Israel) J Erlich (Israel) A Ram	6	6

Quarterfinals
1	(Sweden) S Aspelin (Australia) T Perry	6	7^{7}
(Czech Republic) T Berdych (Czech Republic) T Zíb	2	6^{1}
3	(United States) G Oliver (United States) J Palmer	6	6^{6}	7^{7}
Alt	(South Africa) C Haggard (Argentina) S Prieto	3	7^{8}	6^{5}
Alt	(Slovakia) K Beck (Czech Republic) J Levinský	6	7^{7}
4	(Australia) P Hanley (United States) B MacPhie	2	6^{5}
(Russia) I Andreev (Spain) A Martín	5	1
2	(Israel) J Erlich (Israel) A Ram	7	6

Semifinals
1	(Sweden) S Aspelin (Australia) T Perry	6	6^{3}	6
3	(United States) G Oliver (United States) J Palmer	4	7^{7}	3
Alt	(Slovakia) K Beck (Czech Republic) J Levinský	1	6	3
2	(Israel) J Erlich (Israel) A Ram	6	3	6

Final
1	(Sweden) S Aspelin (Australia) T Perry	6	3	5
2	(Israel) J Erlich (Israel) A Ram	4	6	7
