= 2005 Nottingham Open =

- Date: 13–18 June
- Edition: 16th
- Category: International Series
- Draw: 32S / 16D
- Prize money: $355,000
- Surface: Grass / outdoor
- Location: Nottingham, United Kingdom
- Venue: Nottingham Tennis Centre

Champions

Singles
- (France) Richard Gasquet

Doubles
- (Israel) Jonathan Erlich / (Israel) Andy Ram
← 2004 ·	Nottingham Open	· 2006 →

The 2005 Nottingham Open, also known as The 10tele.com Open- Nottingham for sponsorship reasons, was the 2005 edition of the Nottingham Open men's tennis tournament and played on outdoor grass courts. The tournament was part of the International Series of the 2005 ATP Tour. It was the 16th edition of the tournament and was held from 13 June through 18 June 2005. Fourth-seeded Richard Gasquet won the singles title.

== Finals ==
=== Singles ===
(France) Richard Gasquet defeated (Belarus) Max Mirnyi 6–2, 6–3

=== Doubles ===
(Israel) Jonathan Erlich / (Israel) Andy Ram defeated (Sweden) Simon Aspelin / (Australia) Todd Perry 4–6, 6–3, 7–5
