= 2006 Nottingham Open =

- Date: 19–24 June
- Edition: 17th
- Category: International Series
- Draw: 32S / 16D
- Prize money: $355,000
- Surface: Grass / outdoor
- Location: Nottingham, United Kingdom
- Venue: Nottingham Tennis Centre

Champions

Singles
- (France) Richard Gasquet

Doubles
- (Israel) Jonathan Erlich / (Israel) Andy Ram
← 2005 ·	Nottingham Open	· 2007 →

The 2006 Nottingham Open, also known as red letter DAYS Open- Nottingham for sponsorship reasons, was the 2006 edition of the Nottingham Open men's tennis tournament and played on outdoor grass courts. The tournament was part of the International Series of the 2006 ATP Tour. It was the 17th edition of the tournament and was held from 19 June through 24 June 2006. Richard Gasquet won the singles title.

== Finals ==
=== Singles ===
(France) Richard Gasquet defeated (Sweden) Jonas Björkman 6–4, 6–3

- It was Gasquet's 1st singles title of the year and the 2nd of his career.

=== Doubles ===
(Israel) Jonathan Erlich / (Israel) Andy Ram defeated (Russia) Igor Kunitsyn / (Russia) Dmitry Tursunov 6–3, 6–2
