= 2001 Nottingham Open – Singles =

Singles
- 2001 Nottingham Open

Final
- Champion: (Sweden) Thomas Johansson
- Runner-up: (Israel) Harel Levy
- Score: 7–5, 6–3

Details
- Draw: 32
- Seeds: 8

Events
Singles	Doubles
- Nottingham Open

Sébastien Grosjean was the defending champion but did not compete that year.

Thomas Johansson won in the final 7–5, 6–3 against Harel Levy.

== Seeds ==
1. (United States) Jan-Michael Gambill (first round)
2. (South Africa) Wayne Ferreira (quarterfinals)
3. (Sweden) Thomas Johansson (champion)
4. (Germany) David Prinosil (first round)
5. (France) ~~Fabrice Santoro~~ (withdrew)
6. (Spain) Alberto Martín (first round)
7. (Israel) Harel Levy (final)
8. (Sweden) Jonas Björkman (second round)

== Draw ==
Key

- Q = Qualifier
- WC = Wild card
- LL = Lucky loser
- Alt = Alternate
- ITF = ITF entry
- PR = Protected ranking
- SR = Special ranking
- SE = Special exempt
- JE = Junior exempt
- JR = Junior Accelerator Programme entrant
- CO = College Accelerator Programme entrant
- NG = Next Gen Accelerator Program entrant
- w/o = Walkover
- r = Retired
- d = Defaulted

=== Finals ===
Semifinals
WC	(United Kingdom) Greg Rusedski	6^{6}	3
3	(Sweden) Thomas Johansson	7^{8}	6
(United States) Andy Roddick	6^{3}	7	3
7	(Israel) Harel Levy	7^{7}	5	6

Final
3	(Sweden) Thomas Johansson	7	6
7	(Israel) Harel Levy	5	3

=== Top half ===
First round
1	(United States) J-M Gambill	6^{6}	6^{1}
WC	(United Kingdom) G Rusedski	7^{8}	7^{7}
(Germany) R Schüttler	6	6
Q	(Denmark) K Pless	3	1
Q	(United States) J Stark	4	6	3
Q	(United Kingdom) A Parmar	6	3	6
WC	(United Kingdom) L Childs	4	7	0
LL	(United Kingdom) M Lee	6	5	6
3	(Sweden) T Johansson	6	6
(Belgium) C Rochus	2	2
(Russia) A Stoliarov	6	6
(Spain) J Balcells	1	1
(Armenia) S Sargsian	3	6	5
(Australia) W Arthurs	6	3	7
(Croatia) I Ljubičić	5	5
8	(Sweden) J Björkman	7	7

Second round
WC	(United Kingdom) G Rusedski	7^{7}	4	7^{7}
(Germany) R Schüttler	6^{0}	6	6^{3}
Q	(United Kingdom) A Parmar	4	3
LL	(United Kingdom) M Lee	6	6
3	(Sweden) T Johansson	7	6
(Russia) A Stoliarov	5	0
(Australia) W Arthurs	3	6	6
8	(Sweden) J Björkman	6	4	4

Quarterfinals
WC	(United Kingdom) G Rusedski	6	6
LL	(United Kingdom) M Lee	3	2
3	(Sweden) T Johansson	7^{7}	7^{7}
(Australia) W Arthurs	6^{3}	6^{3}

Semifinals
WC	(United Kingdom) G Rusedski	6^{6}	3
3	(Sweden) T Johansson	7^{8}	6

=== Bottom half ===
First round
6	(Spain) A Martín	4	0
(Switzerland) M Kratochvil	6	6
(Austria) M Hipfl	6	6^{2}	6
(Italy) G Pozzi	3	7^{7}	4
(Switzerland) M Rosset	7^{13}	5	4
(United States) A Roddick	6^{11}	7	6
(Zimbabwe) B Black	6	6
4	(Germany) D Prinosil	3	1
7	(Israel) H Levy	6^{2}	6	6
(South Korea) H-T Lee	7^{7}	2	2
WC	(United Kingdom) J Delgado	2	7^{7}	6
(United States) J Tarango	6	6^{5}	3
(Russia) M Youzhny	6	6
Q	(United Kingdom) B Cowan	3	4
(Austria) S Koubek	4	2
2	(South Africa) W Ferreira	6	6

Second round
(Switzerland) M Kratochvil	6	4
(Austria) M Hipfl	4	2^{r}
(United States) A Roddick	6	7^{7}
(Zimbabwe) B Black	4	6^{3}
7	(Israel) H Levy	6^{5}	6	6
WC	(United Kingdom) J Delgado	7^{7}	3	1
(Russia) M Youzhny	1	7^{7}	3
2	(South Africa) W Ferreira	6	6^{5}	6

Quarterfinals
(Switzerland) M Kratochvil	4	4
(United States) A Roddick	6	6
7	(Israel) H Levy	6	6
2	(South Africa) W Ferreira	2	4

Semifinals
(United States) A Roddick	6^{3}	7	3
7	(Israel) H Levy	7^{7}	5	6
