= 2002 Nottingham Open – Doubles =

Doubles
- 2002 Nottingham Open

Final
- Champion: (United States) Mike Bryan (The Bahamas) Mark Knowles
- Runner-up: (United States) Donald Johnson (United States) Jared Palmer
- Score: 0–6, 7–6^{(7–3)}, 6–4

Details
- Draw: 16
- Seeds: 4

Events
Singles	Doubles
- Nottingham Open

Donald Johnson and Jared Palmer were the defending champions but lost in the final 0–6, 7–6^{(7–3)}, 6–4 against Mike Bryan and Mark Knowles.

== Seeds ==
1. (United States) Donald Johnson / (United States) Jared Palmer (final)
2. (United States) Mike Bryan / (The Bahamas) Mark Knowles (champions)
3. (South Africa) Ellis Ferreira / (United States) Rick Leach (first round)
4. (France) Michaël Llodra / (France) Fabrice Santoro (first round)

== Draw ==
Key

- Q = Qualifier
- WC = Wild card
- LL = Lucky loser
- Alt = Alternate
- ITF = ITF entry
- PR = Protected ranking
- SR = Special ranking
- SE = Special exempt
- JE = Junior exempt
- JR = Junior Accelerator Programme entrant
- CO = College Accelerator Programme entrant
- NG = Next Gen Accelerator Program entrant
- w/o = Walkover
- r = Retired
- d = Defaulted

First round
1	(United States) D Johnson (United States) J Palmer	6	6
(Brazil) A Sá (United States) J Thomas	3	4
(Chile) N Massú (Spain) A Portas	2	3
(South Africa) J Coetzee (Zimbabwe) K Ullyett	6	6
4	(France) M Llodra (France) F Santoro	4	4
(Switzerland) M Kratochvil (Italy) D Sanguinetti	6	6
ALT	(Georgia (country)) I Labadze (Denmark) K Pless	3	6	6
(South Africa) M Barnard (Japan) T Shimada	6	3	3
(South Africa) C Haggard (South Africa) M Wakefield	6^{5}	6^{0}
(Australia) P Hanley (Australia) A Kratzmann	7^{7}	7^{7}
(South Africa) J-L de Jager (South Africa) R Koenig	4	6	6
3	(South Africa) E Ferreira (United States) R Leach	6	2	3
(Australia) S Huss (India) L Paes	4	6^{6}
WC	(United States) G Oliver (United States) A Roddick	6	7^{8}
WC	(United Kingdom) D Sherwood (United Kingdom) K Spencer	2	2
2	(United States) M Bryan (The Bahamas) M Knowles	6	6

Quarterfinals
1	(United States) D Johnson (United States) J Palmer	7^{10}	7
(South Africa) J Coetzee (Zimbabwe) K Ullyett	6^{8}	5
(Switzerland) M Kratochvil (Italy) D Sanguinetti	6	5	2
ALT	(Georgia (country)) I Labadze (Denmark) K Pless	4	7	6
(Australia) P Hanley (Australia) A Kratzmann
(South Africa) J-L de Jager (South Africa) R Koenig	w/o
WC	(United States) G Oliver (United States) A Roddick	4	6	6^{5}
2	(United States) M Bryan (The Bahamas) M Knowles	6	4	7^{7}

Semifinals
1	(United States) D Johnson (United States) J Palmer	6	6
ALT	(Georgia (country)) I Labadze (Denmark) K Pless	3	4
(South Africa) J-L de Jager (South Africa) R Koenig	6^{2}	4
2	(United States) M Bryan (The Bahamas) M Knowles	7^{7}	6

Final
1	(United States) D Johnson (United States) J Palmer	6	6^{3}	4
2	(United States) M Bryan (The Bahamas) M Knowles	0	7^{7}	6
