= Sebastian Fitz =

German tennis player

- Country (sports): Germany
- Born: 12 August 1979 (age 45)
- Plays: Left-handed
- Prize money: $59,256

Singles
- Career record: 0–1
- Highest ranking: No. 257 (21 Feb 2005)

Grand Slam singles results
- Australian Open: Q2 (2005)

Doubles
- Career record: 0–2
- Highest ranking: No. 241 (7 Feb 2005)

Sebastian Fitz (born 12 August 1979) is a German former professional tennis player.

A left-handed player, Fitz reached a career high singles ranking of 257 in the world. His only ATP Tour singles main draw appearance came as a lucky loser at the 2004 Nottingham Open, where he was beaten in the first round by Victor Hănescu in three sets. He made the second qualifying round of the 2005 Australian Open.

Fitz has a younger sister, Christina, who also competed on the professional tennis tour.

== ITF Futures titles ==
=== Singles: (3) ===
No.	Date	Tournament	Surface	Opponent	Score
1.	Aug 2003	Iran F1, Tehran	Clay	(Sweden) Alexander Hartman	7–5, 6–1
2.	Oct 2004	Nigeria F6, Lagos	Hard	(South Africa) Roger Anderson	6–3, 6–7^{(9)}, 6–3
3.	Jul 2006	Germany F9A, Wetzlar	Clay	(Romania) Artemon Apostu-Efremov	6–4, 6–1

=== Doubles: (6) ===
No.	Date	Tournament	Surface	Partner	Opponents	Score
1.	May 2001	Yugoslavia F1, Palić	Clay	(Canada) Dominic Boulet	(Australia) Dejan Petrovic (Russia) Sergei Pozdnev	6–7^{(5)}, 6–4, 6–4
2.	Aug 2001	Luxembourg F2, Luxembourg	Clay	(Australia) Jay Gooding	(Argentina) Roberto Álvarez (France) Jordane Doble	6–7^{(3)}, 6–3, 6–3
3.	May 2004	Germany F5, Esslingen	Clay	(Germany) Marcello Craca	(Germany) Jakub Záhlava (South Africa) Raven Klaasen	7–5, 6–4
4.	May 2004	Saudi Arabia F2, Riyadh	Hard	(Egypt) Karim Maamoun	(India) Mustafa Ghouse (Pakistan) Aisam Qureshi	6–4, 6–4
5.	Jun 2004	Kuwait F2, Mishref	Hard	(Germany) Frank Moser	(Georgia (country)) Gouram Kostava (Iran) Ramin Raziyani	3–6, 6–3, 6–2
6.	Jan 2006	France F2, Feucherolles	Hard	(United Kingdom) David Corrie	(France) Julien Jeanpierre (France) Nicolas Renavand	6–4, 5–7, 6–4
