= Gregory Street tram stop =

Nottingham Express Transit tram stop

Gregory Street
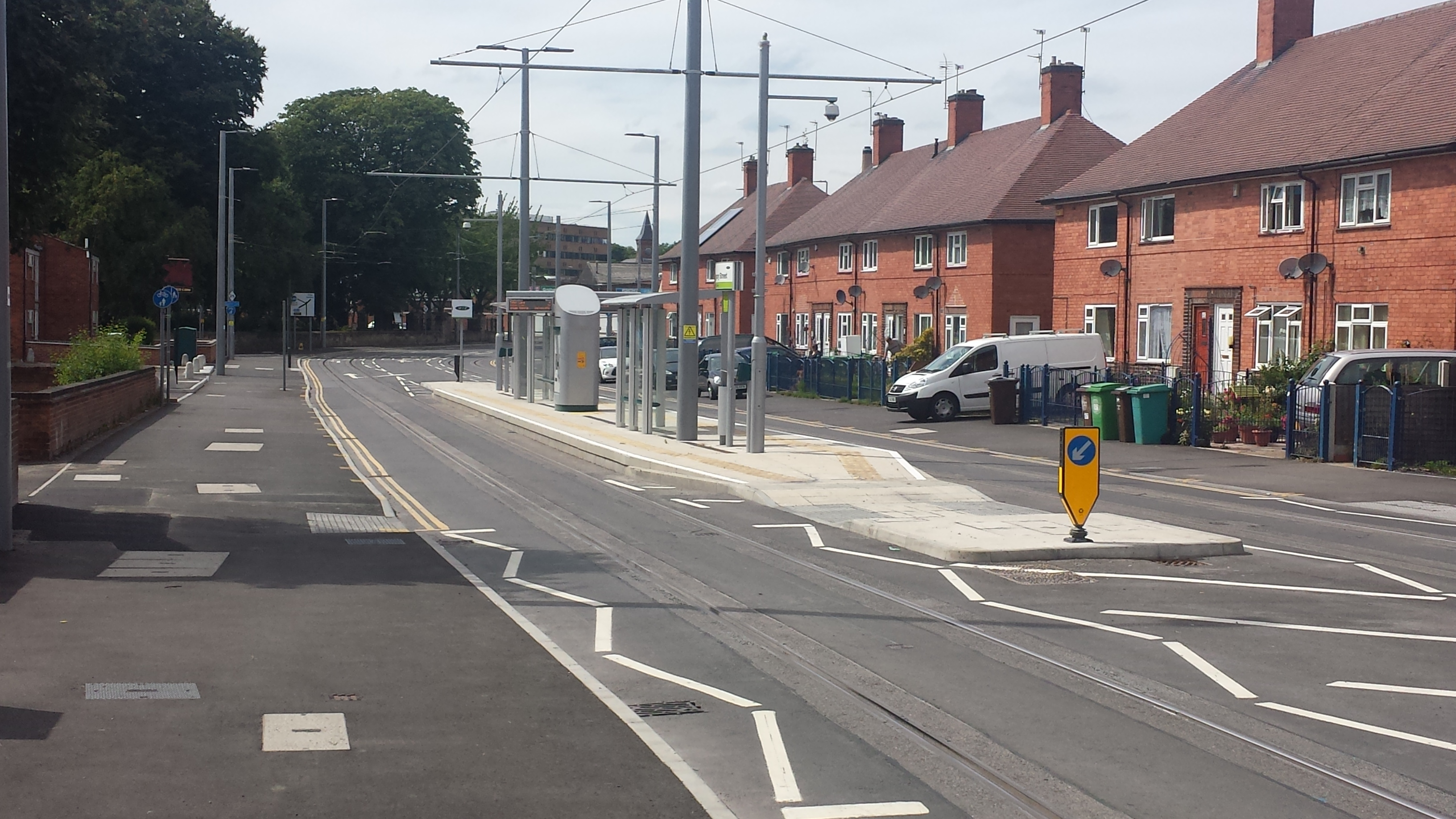

General information
- Location: Lenton, City of Nottingham; England
- Coordinates: 52°56′38″N 1°10′38″W
- System: Nottingham Express Transit tram stop
- Owner: Nottingham Express Transit
- Operator: Nottingham Express Transit
- Line: 1
- Platforms: 2 (island)
- Tracks: 2

Construction
- Structure type: At grade; on street
- Accessible: Step-free access to platform

Key dates
- 25 August 2015: Opened

Services
Preceding station	NET	Following station
NG2 towards Hucknall	Line 1	Queen's Medical Centre towards Toton Lane
Location
- Location within Nottinghamshire

Gregory Street is a tram stop on the Nottingham Express Transit (NET) network in the city of Nottingham, England. It is situated on street track within Lenton Lane, close to that lane's junction with Abbey Street and Gregory Street, and comprises a single island platform situated between the tracks. The stop is on line 1 of the NET, from Hucknall via the city centre to Beeston and Chilwell. Trams run at frequencies that vary between 4 and 8 trams per hour, depending on the day and time of day.

Gregory Street stop opened on 25 August 2015, along with the rest of NET's phase two.
