= 2004 Nottingham Open – Doubles =

Doubles
- 2004 Nottingham Open

Final
- Champions: (Australia) Paul Hanley (Australia) Todd Woodbridge
- Runners-up: (United States) Rick Leach (United States) Brian MacPhie
- Score: 6–4, 6–3

Details
- Draw: 16
- Seeds: 4

Events
| Singles | Doubles |
- Nottingham Open

Bob Bryan and Mike Bryan were the defending champions, but did not participate this year.

Paul Hanley and Todd Woodbridge won the title, defeating Rick Leach and Brian MacPhie 6–4, 6–3 in the final.

== Seeds ==
1. (Australia) Paul Hanley / (Australia) Todd Woodbridge (champions)
2. (The Bahamas) Mark Knowles / (Canada) Daniel Nestor (quarterfinals)
3. (United States) Rick Leach / (United States) Brian MacPhie (final)
4. (The Bahamas) Mark Merklein / (Australia) Todd Perry (quarterfinals)

== Draw ==
Key

- Q = Qualifier
- WC = Wild card
- LL = Lucky loser
- Alt = Alternate
- ITF = ITF entry
- PR = Protected ranking
- SR = Special ranking
- SE = Special exempt
- JE = Junior exempt
- JR = Junior Accelerator Programme entrant
- CO = College Accelerator Programme entrant
- NG = Next Gen Accelerator Program entrant
- w/o = Walkover
- r = Retired
- d = Defaulted

=== Draw ===
First round
1 | (Australia) P Hanley (Australia) T Woodbridge | 6 | 6
(Sweden) S Aspelin (Australia) A Fisher | 2 | 3
(Belgium) G Elseneer (Belgium) O Rochus | 6 | 7^{7}
(Georgia (country)) I Labadze (Austria) J Melzer | 4 | 6^{5}
4 | (The Bahamas) M Merklein (Australia) T Perry | 6^{6} | 6 | 6
WC | (United Kingdom) D Kiernan (United Kingdom) D Sherwood | 7^{8} | 4 | 3
(Australia) J Kerr (Belgium) T Vanhoudt | 4 | 2
(Morocco) H Arazi (France) G Carraz | 6 | 6
(Italy) M Bertolini (South Africa) R Koenig | 0 | 5
(South Africa) J Coetzee (South Africa) C Haggard | 6 | 7
(Sweden) J Johansson (Sweden) R Söderling | 3 | 6 | 2
3 | (United States) R Leach (United States) B MacPhie | 6 | 4 | 6
WC | (United Kingdom) M Hilton (United Kingdom) J Marray | 4 | 3
(Spain) D Ferrer (Spain) A Martín | 6 | 6
(United States) S Humphries (Thailand) P Srichaphan | 4 | 6^{1}
2 | (The Bahamas) M Knowles (Canada) D Nestor | 6 | 7^{7}

Quarterfinals
1 | (Australia) P Hanley (Australia) T Woodbridge | 6 | 6
(Belgium) G Elseneer (Belgium) O Rochus | 1 | 2
4 | (The Bahamas) M Merklein (Australia) T Perry | 3 | 6 | 6^{6}
(Morocco) H Arazi (France) G Carraz | 6 | 4 | 7^{8}
(South Africa) J Coetzee (South Africa) C Haggard | 4 | 6 | 4
3 | (United States) R Leach (United States) B MacPhie | 6 | 3 | 6
(Spain) D Ferrer (Spain) A Martín | 4 | 7^{7} | 7^{7}
2 | (The Bahamas) M Knowles (Canada) D Nestor | 6 | 6^{3} | 6^{1}

Semifinals
1 | (Australia) P Hanley (Australia) T Woodbridge | w/o
(Morocco) H Arazi (France) G Carraz
3 | (United States) R Leach (United States) B MacPhie | 6 | 6
(Spain) D Ferrer (Spain) A Martín | 1 | 4

Final
1 | (Australia) P Hanley (Australia) T Woodbridge | 6 | 6
3 | (United States) R Leach (United States) B MacPhie | 4 | 3
