= David Sammel =

South African tennis coach

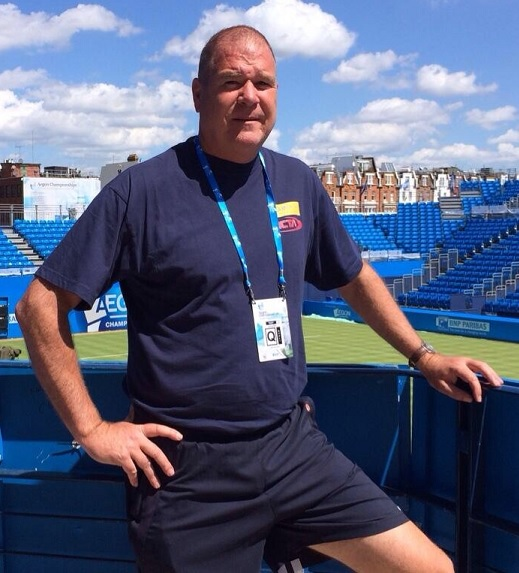
- Tennis coach and author, David Sammel
- Born: July 5, 1961 (age 64); Johannesburg, South Africa
- Citizenship: British
- Education: Bachelor of Arts: Economics and English
- Alma mater: North Texas State University
- Occupation(s): Tennis Coach, Consultant, Author
- Notable work: Locker Room Power, Fit-For-Purpose Leadership #1 and #2
- Website: davidsammel.com

David Sammel (born in 1961 in Johannesburg, South Africa) is a tennis coach, sports consultant and writer. Since 2010, David is the head coach at TeamBath and the author of the book Locker Room Power: Building an Athlete’s Mind.

David has coached dozens of professional players and international junior champions.

He currently coaches Liam Broady, and ATP Tour doubles tennis players Marcus Daniell, Marcelo Demoliner and Matwé Middelkoop.

== Coaching ==
David began coaching at The Metselaers club in Scheveningen, the Netherlands in 1987 whilst still representing the club as a player, assisting with their promotion to the top division. In 1989 after captaining the Manchester Mortgage Corporation League team, he accepted the head coach position at the Matchpoint Indoor Club. He later worked as a National Coach for the Lawn Tennis Association (1996-2006) before founding the Monte Carlo Tennis Academy (MCTA) with Jez Green.

He has been prolific in British tennis, coaching amongst others Jamie Delgado, Arvind Parmar, Andrew Richardson, Martin Lee, Barry Cowan, Miles MacLagan and current players Liam Broady and Samantha Murray. Players from other countries include Wesley Moodie, Chris Haggard and Marius Barnard.

Richardson achieved a five set win over top 30 player Byron Black and reached the third round of Wimbledon in 1997. In 1999 Miles Maclagan held two match-points against Boris Becker and Arvind Parmar qualified for Wimbledon going on to upset the seeded future French Open champion Albert Costa. In 2001, Barry Cowan extended Pete Sampras to five sets in the memorable "You'll never walk alone" court one encounter. Liam Broady was selected for Davis Cup in 2018 and Sam Murray has been part of the Federation Cup squad in 2013.

David Sammel and the team of coaches at TeamBath helped guide Liam Broady, Samantha Murray, Anna Smith, Marcus Daniell (NZ Davis Cup) and Luke Johnson. David is an officially recognised ATP Tour coach.

== TeamBath-MCTA ==
In 2006, David founded the Monte Carlo Tennis Academy (MCTA) in Monaco alongside fitness trainer, Jez Green, who left in December 2007 to become Andy Murray's trainer. The purpose of the academy was to discover, train and manage junior tennis players into top professionals. Players training at the academy included Anna Fitzpatrick, Stefania Boffa, Ana Veselinović, Henri Kontinen, Christina Mathis and Ilija Vucic.

Fitzpatrick was a 2007 junior Wimbledon semi-finalist. Vucic was semi finalist in the Eddie Herr International Junior Championships (losing to Grigor Dimitrov), a finalist of 2009 Astrid Bowl in Belgium, won the 2008 Orange Bowl doubles (with Xander Spong) and finished as a top 30 ranked junior. Kontinen was a 2008 Wimbledon junior finalist. The loss of sponsorship in 2008 curtailed the growing success of the academy.

In 2010, the MCTA relocated and joined with Bath University to form TeamBath-MCTA.

== Writing ==
David regularly writes about sport, psychology and coaching for magazines, websites and his blog. He is a regular columnist for Tennishead Magazine and has articles published on websites including leadersinsport.com, tennis4everyone.com, jezgreen.com and tennisatthenet.com. David's first book, Locker Room Power: Building an Athlete's Mind, was published in January 2014 and has been positively referenced by sports personalities including Stuart Lancaster, Judy Murray and Tim Henman. David has published to further books, A Guide To Moving From Junior To Professional Tennis and Belief vs Confidence: 8 steps to changing your life

In 2017 he was a contributing author to two books on leadership Fit-For-Purpose Leadership #1 and #2

== Consultancy ==
David provides Sports Psychology & Coaching Workshops and Consultancy for professional sports teams and coaches. He has provided consultancy for football clubs including Chelsea, Fulham and Bolton Wanderers. He is a speaker at various conferences and can be booked via the Atlantic Speakers Agency

== Podcast ==
In January 2015, David released the first episode of the Locker Room Power Podcast in which he discusses sporting events and sports psychology. The first episode featured tennis coach Anthony Hampson alongside David. Subsequent episodes have featured tennis players Richard Gabb and Scott Clayton and consultant Efe Ekhaese.
