= NG2 tram stop =

Nottingham Express Transit tram stop

NG2
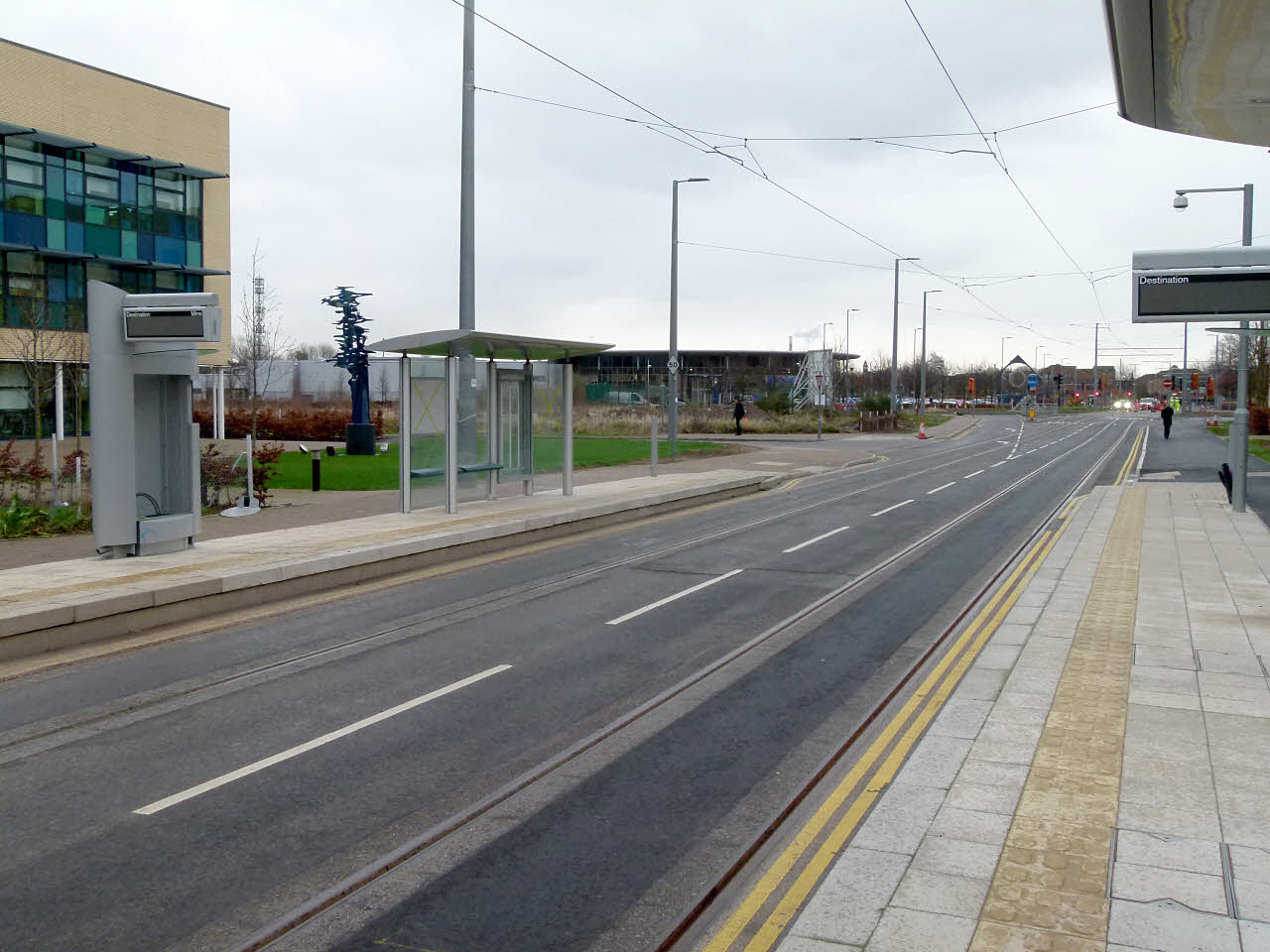

General information
- Location: The Meadows, City of Nottingham; England
- Coordinates: 52°56′31″N 1°09′54″W
- System: Nottingham Express Transit tram stop
- Owner: Nottingham Express Transit
- Operator: Nottingham Express Transit
- Line: 1
- Platforms: 2
- Tracks: 2

Construction
- Structure type: At grade; on street
- Accessible: Step-free access to platform

Key dates
- 25 August 2015: Opened

Services
Preceding station	NET	Following station
Meadows Way West towards Hucknall	Line 1	Gregory Street towards Toton Lane
Location
- Location within Nottinghamshire

NG2 is a tram stop on the Nottingham Express Transit (NET) network in the city of Nottingham. It is situated on street track within Enterprise Way, in the Ng2 business park from which it takes its name, and comprises a pair of side platforms flanking the tracks. The stop is on line 1 of the NET, from Hucknall via the city centre to Beeston and Chilwell. Trams run at frequencies that vary between 4 and 8 trams per hour, depending on the day and time of day.

The NG2 stop opened on 25 August 2015, along with the rest of NET's phase two.
