= 2004 Nottingham Open =

- Date: 14–19 June
- Edition: 15th
- Category: International Series
- Draw: 32S / 16D
- Prize money: $351,000
- Surface: Grass / outdoor
- Location: Nottingham, United Kingdom
- Venue: Nottingham Tennis Centre

Champions

Singles
- (Thailand) Paradorn Srichaphan

Doubles
- (Australia) Paul Hanley / (Australia) Todd Woodbridge
← 2003 ·	Nottingham Open	· 2005 →

The 2004 Nottingham Open, also known as The Nottingham Open presented by The Sunday Telegraph for sponsorship reasons, was the 2004 edition of the Nottingham Open men's tennis tournament and played on outdoor grass courts. The tournament was part of the International Series of the 2004 ATP Tour. It was the 15th edition of the tournament and was held from 14 June through 19 June 2004. Paradorn Srichaphan won the singles title.

== Finals ==
=== Singles ===
(Thailand) Paradorn Srichaphan defeated (Sweden) Thomas Johansson 1–6, 7–6^{(7–4)}, 6–3

- It was Srichaphan's 1st singles title of the year and the 5th and last of his career.

=== Doubles ===
(Australia) Paul Hanley / (Australia) Todd Woodbridge defeated (United States) Rick Leach / (United States) Brian MacPhie 6–4, 6–3
