= 2006 Nottingham Open – Doubles =

Doubles
- 2006 Nottingham Open

Final
- Champions: (Israel) Jonathan Erlich (Israel) Andy Ram
- Runners-up: (Russia) Igor Kunitsyn (Russia) Dmitry Tursunov
- Score: 6–3, 6–2

Details
- Draw: 16
- Seeds: 4

Events
Singles	Doubles
- Nottingham Open

Jonathan Erlich and Andy Ram were the defending champions.

Erlich and Ram successfully defended their title, defeating Igor Kunitsyn and Dmitry Tursunov 6–3, 6–2 in the final.

== Seeds ==
1. (Israel) Jonathan Erlich / (Israel) Andy Ram (champions)
2. (Australia) Stephen Huss / (South Africa) Wesley Moodie (semifinals)
3. (Czech Republic) Jaroslav Levinský / (Sweden) Robert Lindstedt (first round)
4. (Australia) Ashley Fisher / (Australia) Jordan Kerr (first round)

== Draw ==
Key

- Q = Qualifier
- WC = Wild card
- LL = Lucky loser
- Alt = Alternate
- ITF = ITF entry
- PR = Protected ranking
- SR = Special ranking
- SE = Special exempt
- JE = Junior exempt
- JR = Junior Accelerator Programme entrant
- CO = College Accelerator Programme entrant
- NG = Next Gen Accelerator Program entrant
- w/o = Walkover
- r = Retired
- d = Defaulted

=== Draw ===
First round
1	(Israel) J Erlich (Israel) A Ram	7^{7}	6
WC	(United Kingdom) J Delgado (United Kingdom) M Lee	6^{1}	1
(France) R Gasquet (France) N Mahut	6	6
(Belgium) O Rochus (France) G Simon	4	2
4	(Australia) A Fisher (Australia) J Kerr	3	6^{3}
(United States) P Goldstein (United States) J Thomas	6	7^{7}
(Italy) D Bracciali (Slovakia) D Hrbatý	7	7^{9}
(Spain) N Almagro (Chinese Taipei) Y-t Wang	5	6^{7}
WC	(United Kingdom) A Murray (United Kingdom) J Murray	0^{r}
(United States) J Gimelstob (Switzerland) S Wawrinka	4
(Russia) I Kunitsyn (Russia) D Tursunov	6	6
3	(Czech Republic) J Levinský (Sweden) R Lindstedt	3	4
(South Africa) J Coetzee (United States) T Parrott	3	6^{5}
(Belgium) X Malisse (France) P-H Mathieu	6	7^{7}
(Thailand) P Srichaphan (Thailand) D Udomchoke	2	6	[7]
2	(Australia) S Huss (South Africa) W Moodie	6	4	[10]

Quarterfinals
1	(Israel) J Erlich (Israel) A Ram	6	6
(France) R Gasquet (France) N Mahut	0	3
(United States) P Goldstein (United States) J Thomas	5	6	[10]
(Italy) D Bracciali (Slovakia) D Hrbatý	7	4	[6]
(United States) J Gimelstob (Switzerland) S Wawrinka	5	4
(Russia) I Kunitsyn (Russia) D Tursunov	7	6
(Belgium) X Malisse (France) P-H Mathieu	4	7^{10}	[9]
2	(Australia) S Huss (South Africa) W Moodie	6	6^{8}	[11]

Semifinals
1	(Israel) J Erlich (Israel) A Ram	7^{9}	7^{7}
(United States) P Goldstein (United States) J Thomas	6^{7}	6^{4}
(Russia) I Kunitsyn (Russia) D Tursunov	6	5	[11]
2	(Australia) S Huss (South Africa) W Moodie	3	7	[9]

Final
1	(Israel) J Erlich (Israel) A Ram	6	6
(Russia) I Kunitsyn (Russia) D Tursunov	3	2
