= University Boulevard tram stop =

Nottingham Express Transit tram stop

University Boulevard
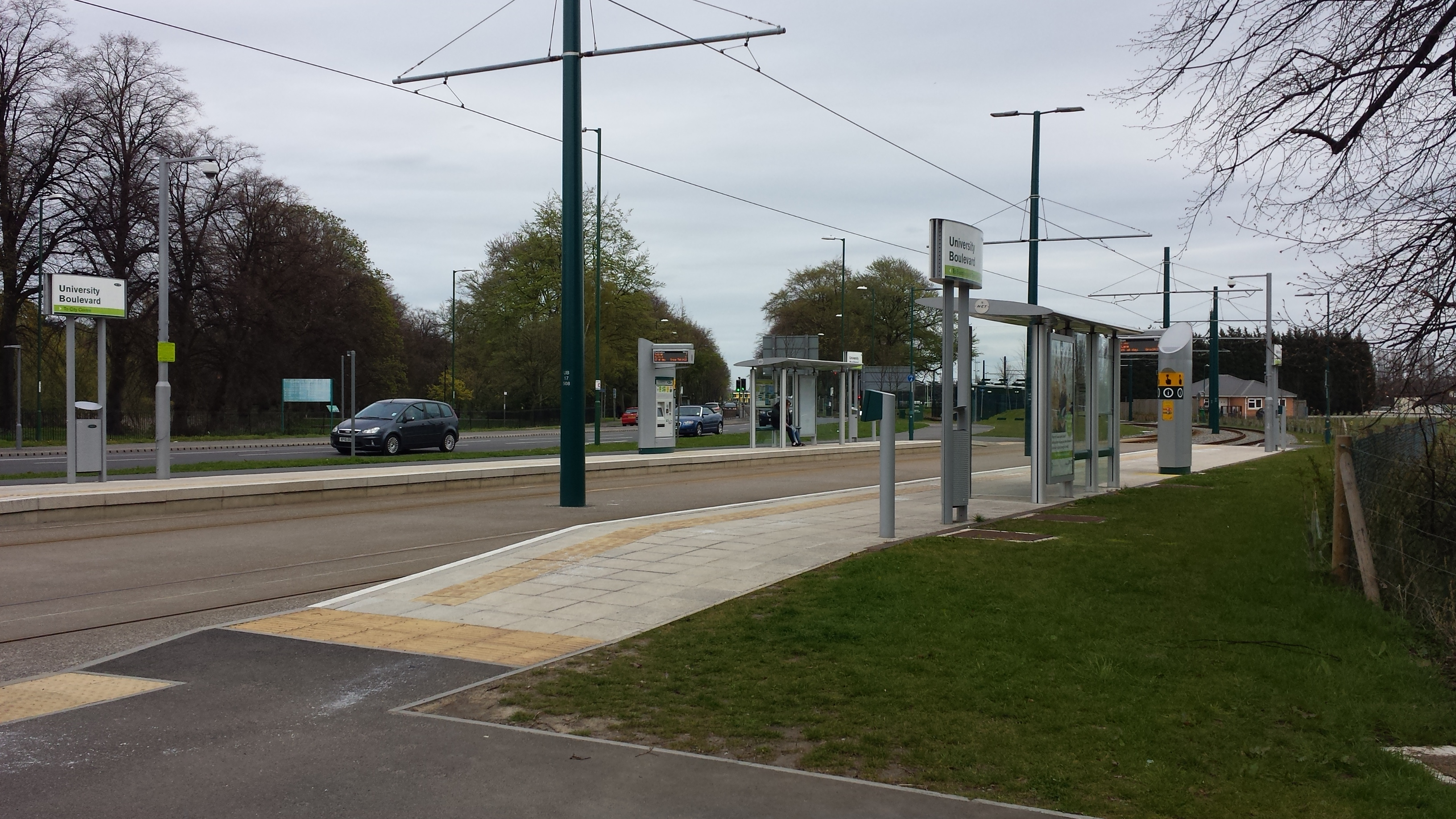

General information
- Location: University of Nottingham, City of Nottingham
- Coordinates: 52°55′56″N 1°12′08″W
- System: Nottingham Express Transit tram stop
- Owner: Nottingham Express Transit
- Operator: Nottingham Express Transit
- Line: 1
- Platforms: 2
- Tracks: 2

Construction
- Structure type: At grade; on roadside reserved track
- Accessible: Step-free access to platform

Key dates
- 25 August 2015: Opened

Services
Preceding station	NET	Following station
University of Nottingham towards Hucknall	Line 1	Middle Street towards Toton Lane
Location
- Location within Nottinghamshire

University Boulevard is a tram stop on the Nottingham Express Transit (NET) network in the city of Nottingham. It is situated on reserved track alongside University Boulevard (A6005) close to the boulevard's junction with Queen's Road East and Lower Road, and comprises a pair of side platforms flanking the tracks. The stop is on line 1 of the NET, from Hucknall via the city centre to Beeston and Chilwell. Trams run at frequencies that vary between 4 and 8 trams per hour, depending on the day and time of day.

From the Chilwell direction, trams approach this stop along street track within Lower Road, crossing Queen's Road East immediately before the stop, which lies parallel to the south side of the boulevard. Heading towards the city centre and Hucknall, the trams run along reserved track on the south side of University Boulevard. This reserved track incorporates a cross-over and a loop siding just to the east of the tram stop.

The University Boulevard stop opened on 25 August 2015, along with the rest of NET's phase two.
