= Middle Street tram stop =

Nottingham Express Transit tram stop

Middle Street
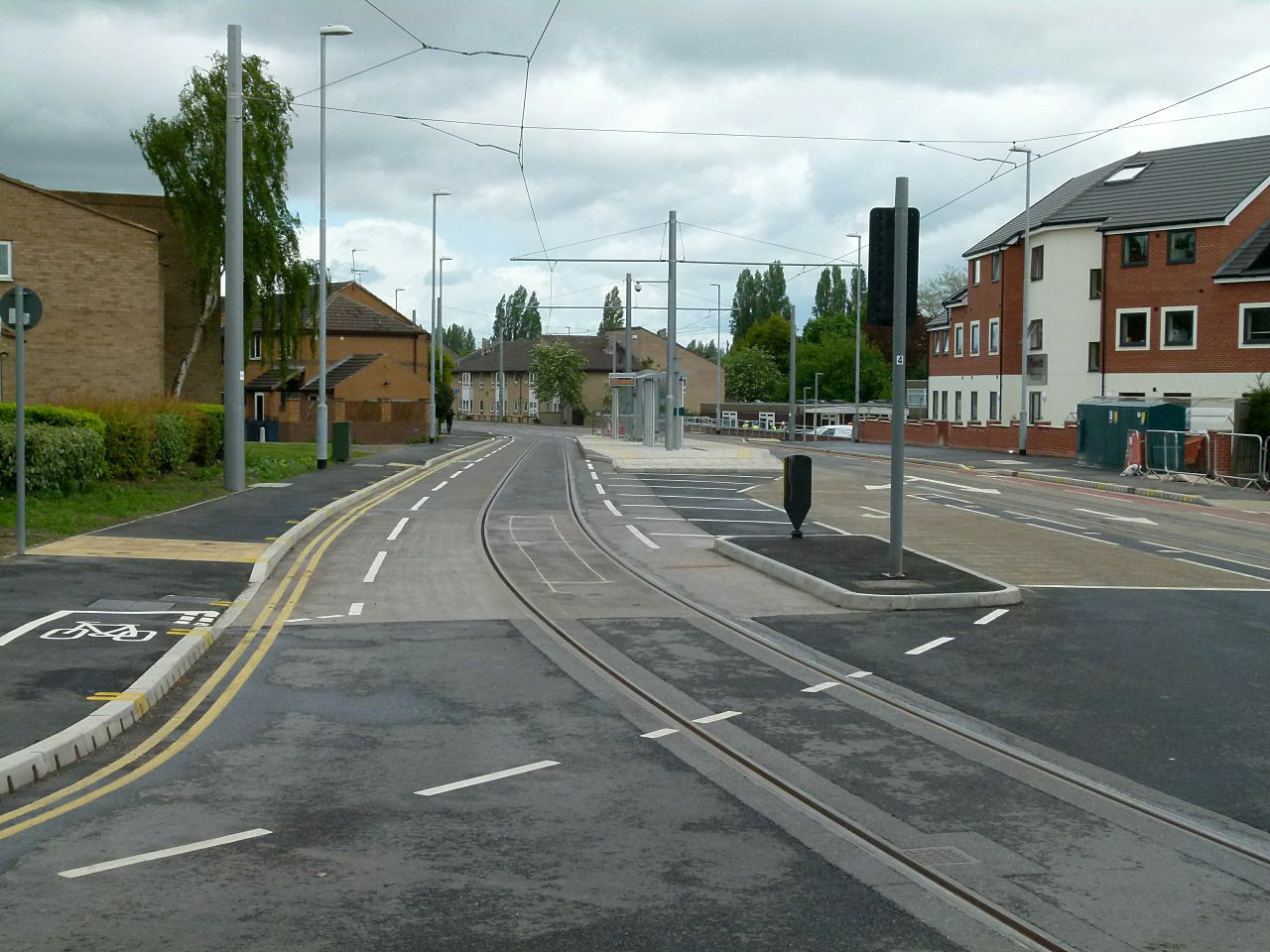

General information
- Location: Beeston, Broxtowe; England
- Coordinates: 52°55′41″N 1°12′31″W
- System: Nottingham Express Transit tram stop
- Owner: Nottingham Express Transit
- Operator: Nottingham Express Transit
- Line: 1
- Platforms: 2 (island)
- Tracks: 2

Construction
- Structure type: At grade; on street
- Accessible: Step-free access to platform

Key dates
- 25 August 2015: Opened

Services
Preceding station	NET	Following station
University Boulevard towards Hucknall	Line 1	Beeston Town Centre towards Toton Lane
Location
- Location within Nottinghamshire

Middle Street is a tram stop on the Nottingham Express Transit (NET) network in the town of Beeston. It is situated on street track within Middle Street and comprises a single island platform situated between the tracks. The stop is on line 1 of the NET, from Hucknall via the city centre to Beeston and Chilwell. Trams run at frequencies that vary between 4 and 8 trams per hour, depending on the day and time of day.

Middle Street stop opened on 25 August 2015, along with the rest of NET's phase two.
