= Queen's Medical Centre tram stop =

Nottingham Express Transit tram stop

Queen's Medical Centre
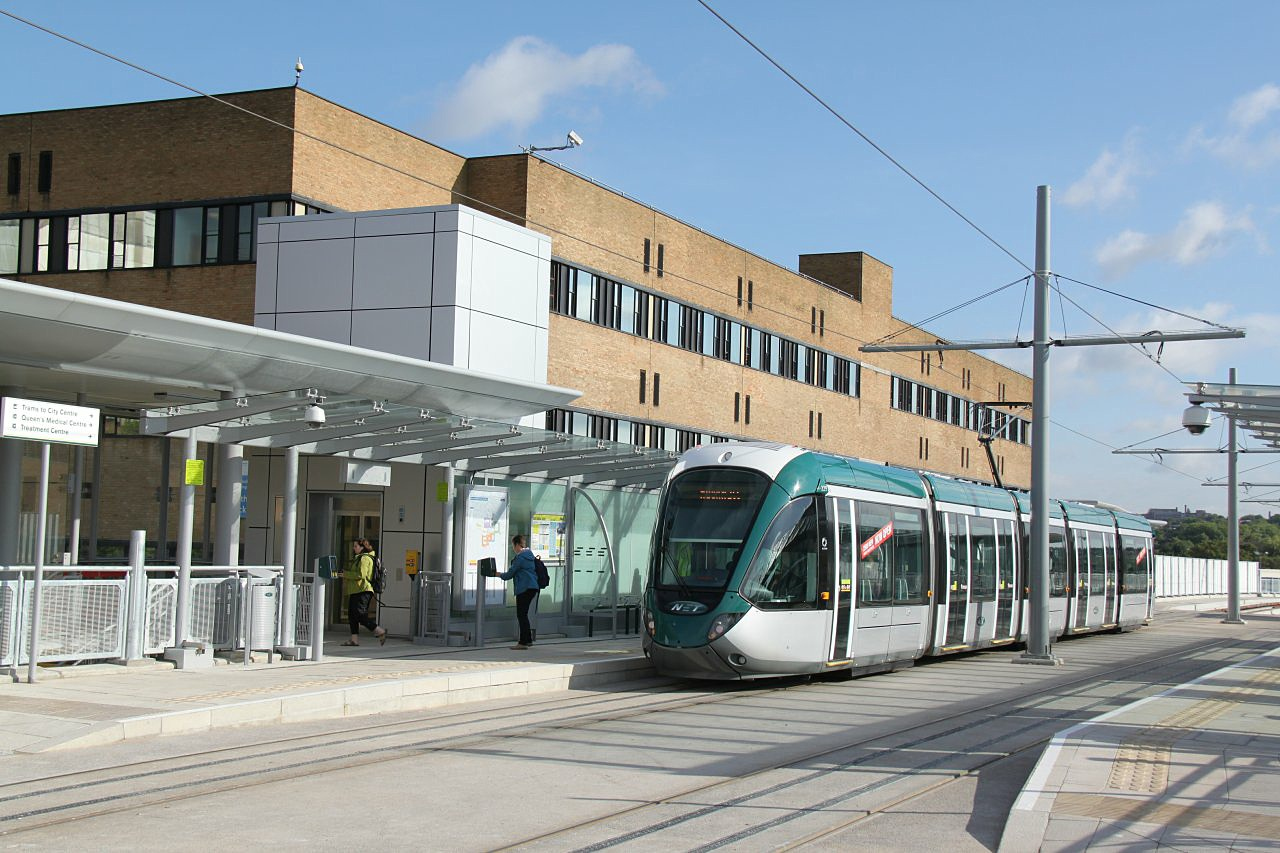

General information
- Location: Queen's Medical Centre, City of Nottingham; England
- Coordinates: 52°56′33″N 1°11′02″W
- System: Nottingham Express Transit tram stop
- Owner: Nottingham Express Transit
- Operator: Nottingham Express Transit
- Line: 1
- Platforms: 2
- Tracks: 2

Construction
- Structure type: Viaduct
- Accessible: Step-free access to platform

Key dates
- 25 August 2015: Opened

Services
Preceding station	NET	Following station
Gregory Street towards Hucknall	Line 1	University of Nottingham towards Toton Lane
Location
- Location within Nottinghamshire

Queen's Medical Centre is a tram stop on the Nottingham Express Transit (NET) network. The stop serves the Queen's Medical Centre, a hospital in the city of Nottingham. The stop is on line 1 of the NET, from Hucknall via the city centre to Beeston and Chilwell. Trams run at frequencies that vary between four and eight trams per hour, depending on the day and time of day.

The tram stop is situated on a viaduct that rises alongside the campus of the University of Nottingham, crosses the Nottingham Ring Road (A52), runs between the South Block of the Queen's Medical Centre (to the north) and the Nottingham Treatment Centre (to the south), crosses the River Leen, and finally descends back to street level. The tram stop is on the section between the hospitals, and direct access bridges have been constructed from the platforms to the two buildings that will be opened once the necessary changes have been made within the buildings. Access is also available by staircase and lift from ground level in the hospital grounds, and by a walkway along the viaduct from another staircase and lift to the university side of the ring road.

Queen's Medical Centre opened on 25 August 2015, along with the rest of NET's phase two. The adjacent bridge over the city's ring road was named the Ningbo Friendship Bridge at a ceremony attended by the Lord Mayor of Nottingham and the Vice-Mayor of Ningbo in China. The name celebrates Nottingham's links with its twin city and the presence there of a campus of the University of Nottingham.

The tram line through the QMC had to be specially designed to avoid electromagnetic interference which could affect hospital equipment. The overhead line masts are individually fed with power, to limit interference.

== Gallery ==
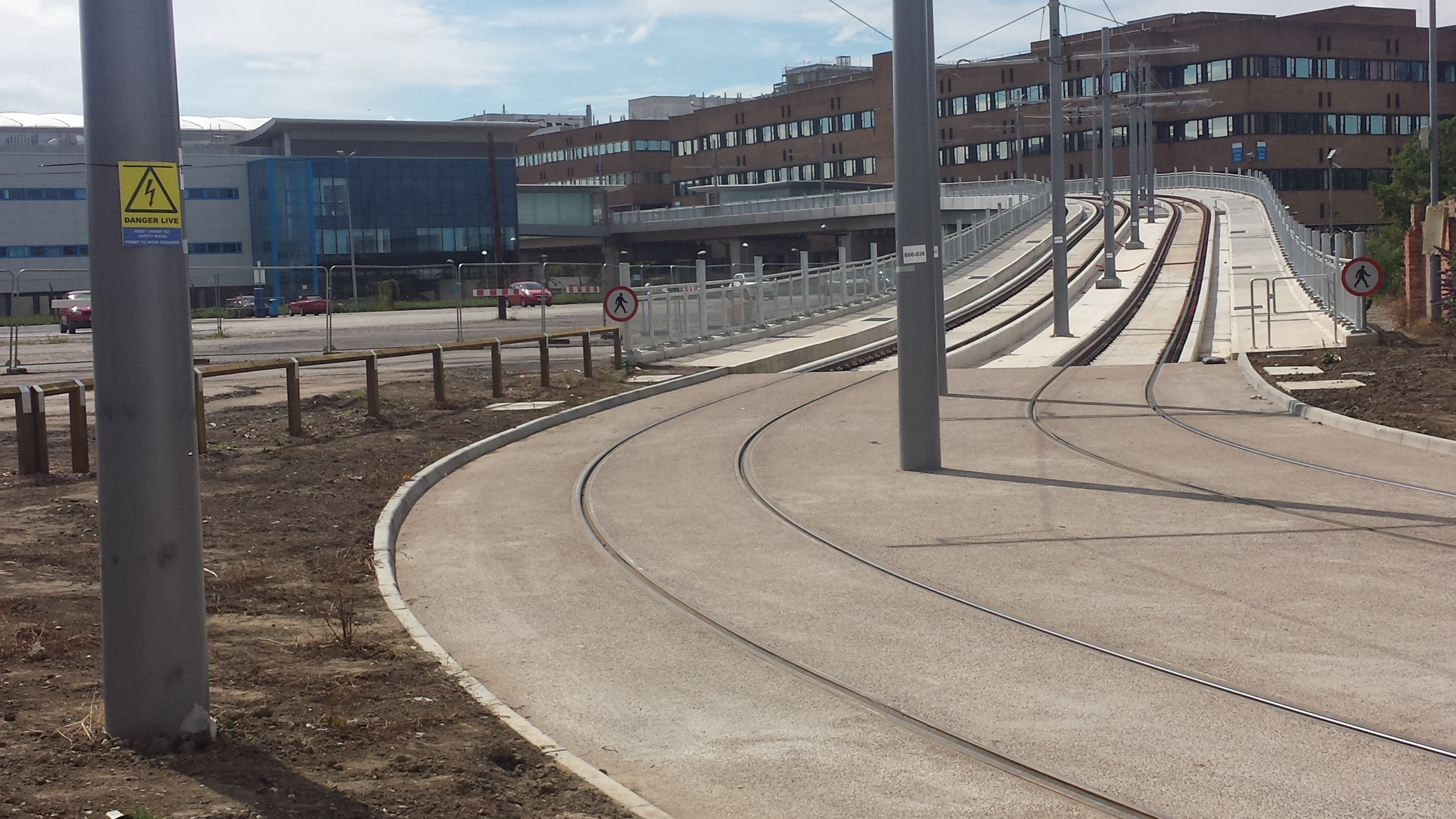
The eastern ramp and tram stop seen from street level

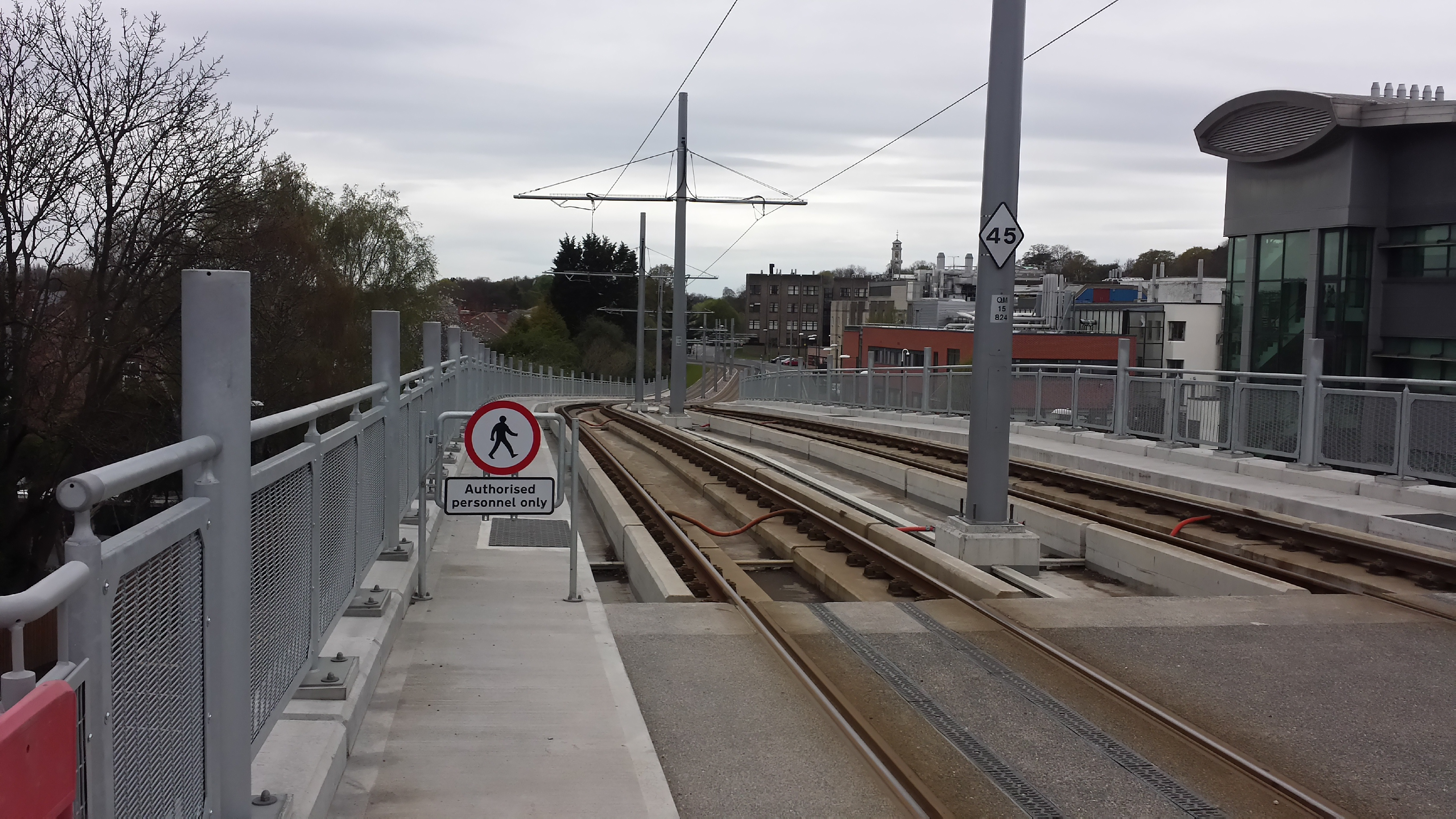
The western ramp seen from the viaduct

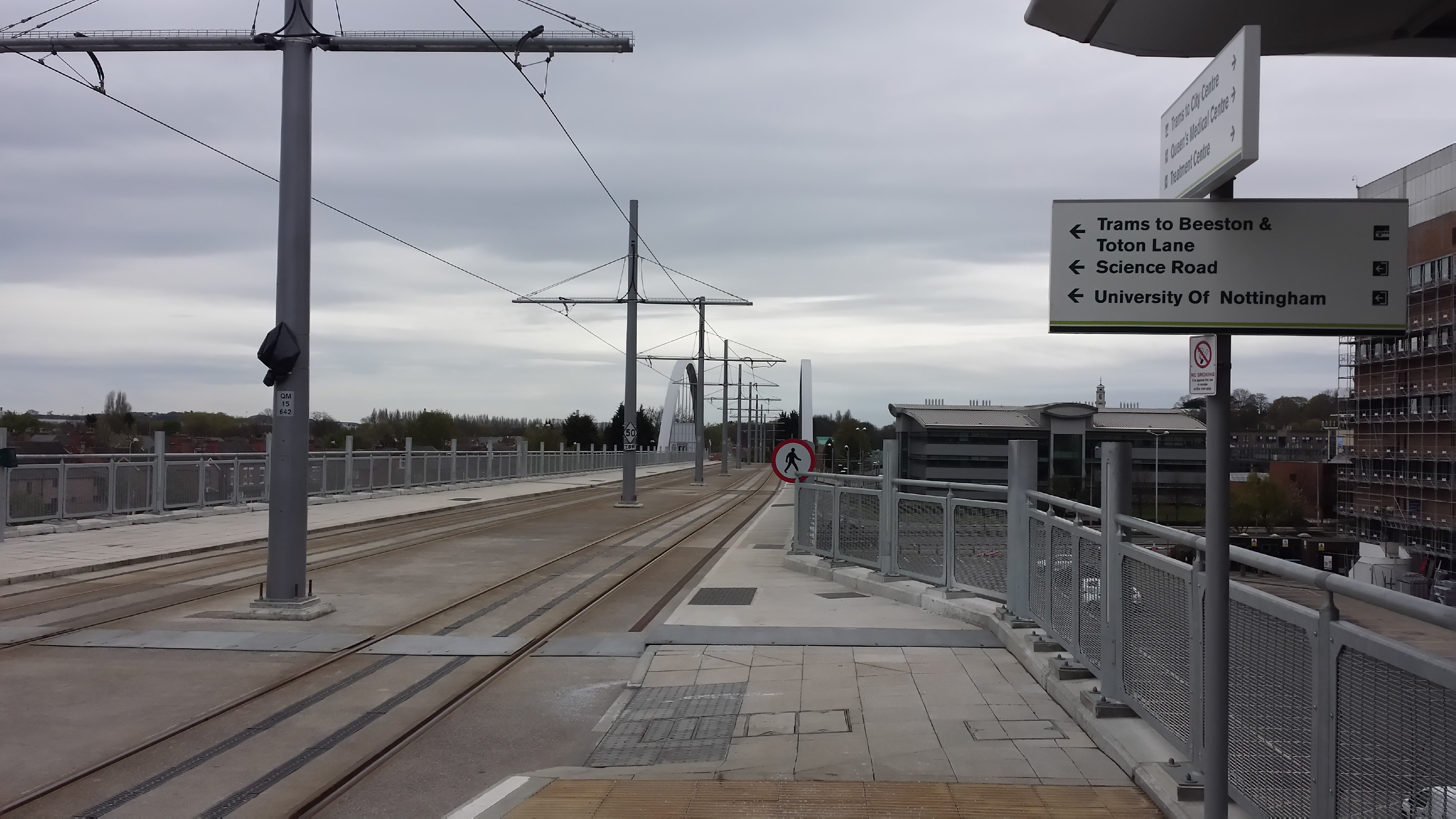
The viaduct and ring road bridge seen from the tram stop
