= 2001 Nottingham Open – Doubles =

Doubles
- 2001 Nottingham Open

Final
- Champion: (United States) Donald Johnson (United States) Jared Palmer
- Runner-up: (Australia) Paul Hanley (Australia) Andrew Kratzmann
- Score: 6–4, 6–2

Details
- Draw: 16
- Seeds: 4

Events
Singles	Doubles
- Nottingham Open

Despite Donald Johnson and Piet Norval being the defending champions, only Johnson competed that year with Jared Palmer.

Johnson and Palmer won in the final 6–4, 6–2 against Paul Hanley and Andrew Kratzmann.

== Seeds ==
1. (United States) Donald Johnson / (United States) Jared Palmer (champions)
2. (South Africa) Ellis Ferreira / (United States) Rick Leach (quarterfinals)
3. (Australia) Michael Hill / (Zimbabwe) Kevin Ullyett (quarterfinals)
4. (United States) Scott Humphries / (United States) Brian MacPhie (first round)

== Draw ==
Key

- Q = Qualifier
- WC = Wild card
- LL = Lucky loser
- Alt = Alternate
- ITF = ITF entry
- PR = Protected ranking
- SR = Special ranking
- SE = Special exempt
- JE = Junior exempt
- JR = Junior Accelerator Programme entrant
- CO = College Accelerator Programme entrant
- NG = Next Gen Accelerator Program entrant
- w/o = Walkover
- r = Retired
- d = Defaulted

First round
1	(United States) D Johnson (United States) J Palmer	6	7^{8}
(Argentina) P Albano (Argentina) L Arnold	4	6^{6}
(South Africa) J Coetzee (South Africa) B Haygarth	6	7^{12}
WC	(United Kingdom) O Freelove (United Kingdom) K Spencer	4	6^{10}
4	(United States) S Humphries (United States) B MacPhie	6^{4}	6	6^{3}
(Israel) H Levy (Australia) P Tramacchi	7^{7}	4	7^{7}
(Spain) A Martín (Russia) A Stoliarov	6^{10}	4
(South Africa) J-L de Jager (United States) J Stark	7^{12}	6
(South Africa) D Adams (Russia) A Olhovskiy	6	7^{7}
WC	(United Kingdom) B Cowan (United Kingdom) J Delgado	3	6^{4}
Q	(Switzerland) M Kratochvil (Russia) M Youzhny	7^{8}	3	4
3	(Australia) M Hill (Zimbabwe) K Ullyett	6^{6}	6	6
(Australia) P Hanley (Australia) A Kratzmann	7	6
WC	(United Kingdom) L Childs (Denmark) K Pless	5	3
(Australia) T Crichton (Australia) B Ellwood	6^{2}	6^{2}
2	(South Africa) E Ferreira (United States) R Leach	7^{7}	7^{7}

Quarterfinals
1	(United States) D Johnson (United States) J Palmer	6	6
(South Africa) J Coetzee (South Africa) B Haygarth	3	2
(Israel) H Levy (Australia) P Tramacchi	3	6	6
(South Africa) J-L de Jager (United States) J Stark	6	1	4
(South Africa) D Adams (Russia) A Olhovskiy	6	3	6
3	(Australia) M Hill (Zimbabwe) K Ullyett	3	6	1
(Australia) P Hanley (Australia) A Kratzmann	3	7^{7}	7^{13}
2	(South Africa) E Ferreira (United States) R Leach	6	6^{4}	6^{11}

Semifinals
1	(United States) D Johnson (United States) J Palmer	6	7
(Israel) H Levy (Australia) P Tramacchi	1	5
(South Africa) D Adams (Russia) A Olhovskiy	4	6^{4}
(Australia) P Hanley (Australia) A Kratzmann	6	7^{7}

Final
1	(United States) D Johnson (United States) J Palmer	6	6
(Australia) P Hanley (Australia) A Kratzmann	4	2
