= Meadows Way West tram stop =

Nottingham Express Transit tram stop

Meadows Way West
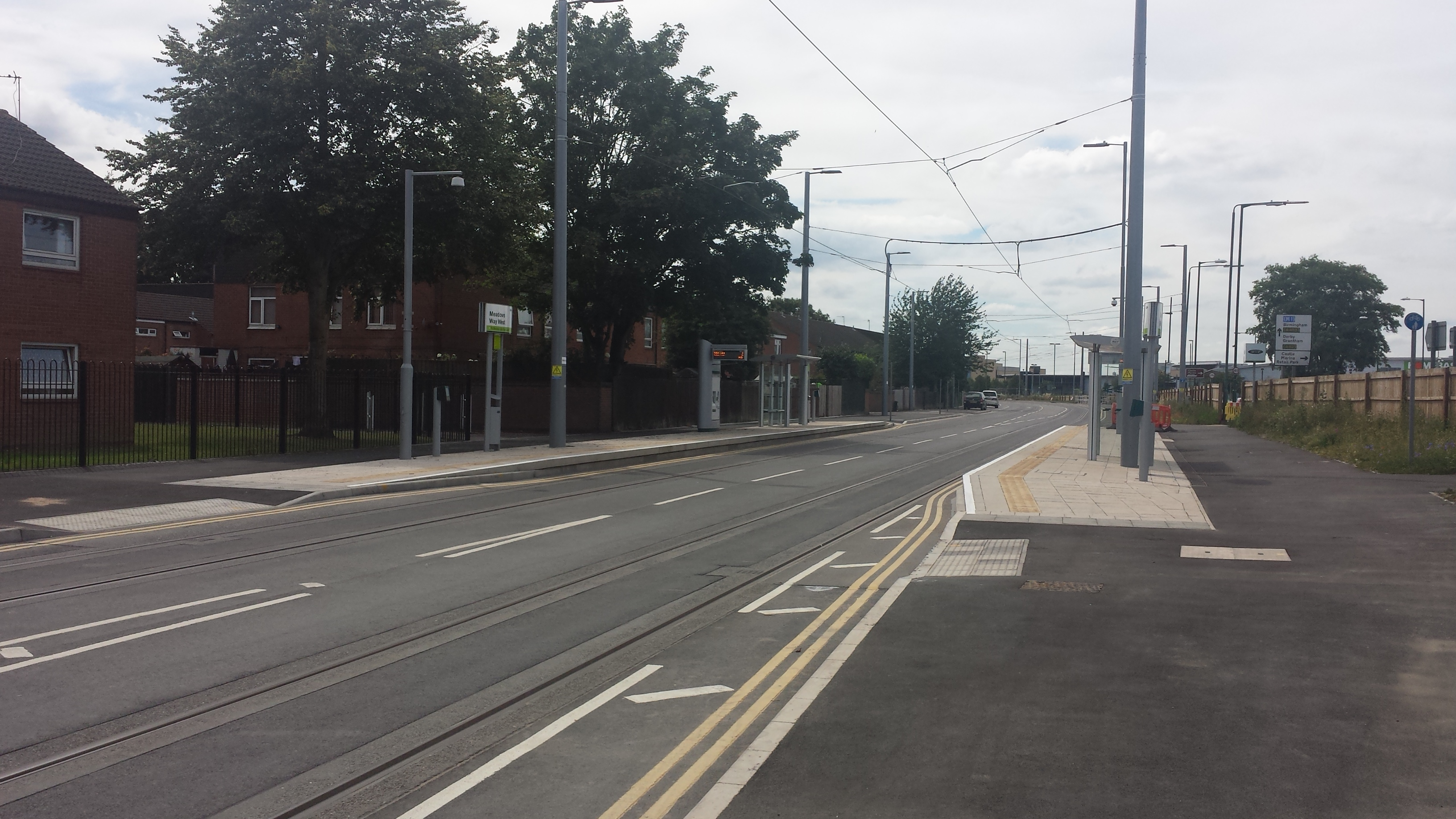

General information
- Location: The Meadows, City of Nottingham; England
- Coordinates: 52°56′36″N 1°09′24″W
- System: Nottingham Express Transit tram stop
- Owner: Nottingham Express Transit
- Operator: Nottingham Express Transit
- Line: 1
- Platforms: 2
- Tracks: 2

Construction
- Structure type: At grade; on street
- Accessible: Step-free access to platform

Key dates
- 25 August 2015: Opened

Services
Preceding station	NET	Following station
Nottingham Station towards Hucknall	Line 1	NG2 towards Toton Lane
Location
- Location within Nottinghamshire

Meadows Way West is a tram stop on the Nottingham Express Transit (NET) network, previously known as Meadows North. The stop is situated on Meadows Way in the Meadows area of the city of Nottingham. The stop is on line 1 of the NET, from Hucknall via the city centre to Beeston and Chilwell.

Meadows Way West opened on 25 August 2015, along with the rest of NET's phase two. Trams run at frequencies that vary between 4 and 8 trams per hour, depending on the day and time of day.

In the original plans for NET phase two, the stop was known as Meadows North but was renamed before opening to better reflect its location.
