= 2006 Nottingham Open – Singles =

Singles
- 2006 Nottingham Open

Final
- Champion: (France) Richard Gasquet
- Runner-up: (Sweden) Jonas Björkman
- Score: 6–4, 6–3

Details
- Draw: 32
- Seeds: 8

Events
Singles	Doubles
- Nottingham Open

Richard Gasquet successfully defended his title, defeating Jonas Björkman 6–4, 6–3 in the final.

== Seeds ==
1. (Sweden) Thomas Johansson (first round)
2. (Slovakia) Dominik Hrbatý (second round)
3. (Belgium) Olivier Rochus (first round)
4. (Spain) ~~Fernando Verdasco~~ (withdrew)
5. (Russia) Dmitry Tursunov (first round)
6. (France) Paul-Henri Mathieu (first round)
7. (Thailand) Paradorn Srichaphan (second round)
8. (Spain) Nicolás Almagro (first round)
9. (Belgium) Xavier Malisse (first round)

== Draw ==
Key

- Q = Qualifier
- WC = Wild card
- LL = Lucky loser
- Alt = Alternate
- ITF = ITF entry
- PR = Protected ranking
- SR = Special ranking
- SE = Special exempt
- JE = Junior exempt
- JR = Junior Accelerator Programme entrant
- CO = College Accelerator Programme entrant
- NG = Next Gen Accelerator Program entrant
- w/o = Walkover
- r = Retired
- d = Defaulted

=== Finals ===
Semifinals
(France) Richard Gasquet	7^{9}	7^{7}
(Sweden) Robin Söderling	6^{7}	6^{5}
(Sweden) Jonas Björkman	6	6
(Italy) Andreas Seppi	3	1

Final
(France) Richard Gasquet	6	6
(Sweden) Jonas Björkman	4	3

=== Top half ===
First round
1	(Sweden) T Johansson	6^{6}	7^{13}	4
LL	(Czech Republic) J Vacek	7^{8}	6^{11}	6
Q	(Russia) I Kunitsyn	4	3
(France) G Simon	6	6
(France) R Gasquet	6	3	7
Q	(Spain) I Navarro Pastor	3	6	5
(Italy) D Bracciali	1	6	7^{9}
8	(Spain) N Almagro	6	3	6^{7}
9	(Belgium) X Malisse	6	6^{8}	5
(France) N Mahut	3	7^{10}	7
(Sweden) R Söderling	7^{7}	6^{4}	7^{9}
(United States) J Gimelstob	6^{5}	7^{7}	6^{7}
WC	(United Kingdom) R Bloomfield	4	6	3
Q	(Serbia) J Tipsarević	6	3	6
Q	(Thailand) D Udomchoke	3	6^{4}
7	(Thailand) P Srichaphan	6	7^{7}

Second round
LL	(Czech Republic) J Vacek	6	4	3
(France) G Simon	4	6	6
(France) R Gasquet	7	6
(Italy) D Bracciali	5	3
(France) N Mahut	3	2
(Sweden) R Söderling	6	6
Q	(Serbia) J Tipsarević	7^{7}	6^{4}	7
7	(Thailand) P Srichaphan	6^{3}	7^{7}	5

Quarterfinals
(France) G Simon	3	1
(France) R Gasquet	6	6
(Sweden) R Söderling	7^{7}	6
Q	(Serbia) J Tipsarević	6^{4}	4

Semifinals
(France) R Gasquet	7^{9}	7^{7}
(Sweden) R Söderling	6^{7}	6^{5}

=== Bottom half ===
First round
6	(France) P-H Mathieu	4	4
(Czech Republic) J Vaněk	6	6
(Sweden) J Björkman	2	6	6
(Argentina) A Calleri	6	1	3
(United States) P Goldstein	6	7
(South Africa) W Moodie	1	5
(Spain) F López	6	6
3	(Belgium) O Rochus	3	1
5	(Russia) D Tursunov	4	3
WC	(United Kingdom) A Murray	6	6
WC	(United Kingdom) A Bogdanović	6	6^{4}	3
(Belarus) M Mirnyi	4	7^{7}	6
(Switzerland) S Wawrinka	6^{7}	6	4
(Italy) A Seppi	7^{9}	4	6
(Chinese Taipei) Y-t Wang	0	3
2	(Slovakia) D Hrbatý	6	6

Second round
(Czech Republic) J Vaněk	3	3
(Sweden) J Björkman	6	6
(United States) P Goldstein	6	2	3
(Spain) F López	3	6	6
WC	(United Kingdom) A Murray	7^{7}	6
(Belarus) M Mirnyi	6^{2}	4
(Italy) A Seppi	7	7
2	(Slovakia) D Hrbatý	5	5

Quarterfinals
(Sweden) J Björkman	6	6
(Spain) F López	3	4
WC	(United Kingdom) A Murray	6^{4}	6	1
(Italy) A Seppi	7^{7}	4	6

Semifinals
(Sweden) J Björkman	6	6
(Italy) A Seppi	3	1
