= Jared Palmer =

American tennis player

Jared Eiseley Palmer
- Country (sports): United States
- Residence: Palo Alto, California, US
- Born: July 2, 1971 (age 54) New York City, US
- Height: 6 ft 3 in (1.91 m)
- Turned pro: 1991
- Retired: 2005
- Plays: Right-handed (one-handed backhand)
- Prize money: US$ 3,413,189

Singles
- Career record: 69–80
- Career titles: 1
- Highest ranking: No. 35 (14 November 1994)

Grand Slam singles results
- Australian Open: 2R (1994)
- French Open: 2R (1994, 1995)
- Wimbledon: 3R (1995)
- US Open: 4R (1995)

Doubles
- Career record: 421–248
- Career titles: 28
- Highest ranking: No. 1 (20 March 2000)

Grand Slam doubles results
- Australian Open: W (1995)
- French Open: SF (1996)
- Wimbledon: W (2001)
- US Open: F (2001)

Other doubles tournaments
- Tour Finals: SF (2001)
- Olympic Games: 2R (2000)

Grand Slam mixed doubles results
- Australian Open: W (2000)
- French Open: SF (2002)
- Wimbledon: 3R (2000, 2002)
- US Open: W (2000)
- Last updated on: 29 October 2021.

Jared Eiseley Palmer (born July 2, 1971) is an American former professional tennis player who won 28 professional doubles titles (including his wins at the Australian Open and Wimbledon) and one singles title in his career on the ATP Tour. He also won four double titles on the challenger's circuit (two in 1992 and two in 1993). Palmer turned professional in 1991 after winning the 1991 NCAA Division 1 singles title as a sophomore playing for Stanford University.

Palmer's biggest doubles titles came at the 1995 Australian Open and the 2001 Wimbledon. Palmer also won the ATP Masters Series event at Indian Wells in 2000. Additionally, Palmer reached the doubles final at two other Grand Slam events, Wimbledon in 1999 and the US Open in 2001. Palmer made the finals at six additional AMS events: Canada (1994 and 2001), Miami (1994 and 2002), Hamburg (1999) and Paris (1999).

Palmer was ranked the World No. 1 men's doubles player on March 20, 2000. He was also ranked as high as World No. 35 in singles. His lone singles title on the ATP tour came at (Pinehurst in 1994). Palmer retired from tennis in 2005 after earning $3,471,164 in career prize money while on the ATP Tour.

Palmer resided in Palo Alto and Stockholm.

== Junior Grand Slam finals ==
=== Singles: 1 (1 runner-up) ===
Result	Year	Championship	Surface	Opponent	Score
Loss	1989	French Open	Clay	(France) Fabrice Santoro	3–6, 6–3, 7–9

=== Doubles: 1 (1 title) ===
Result	Year	Championship	Surface	Partner	Opponents	Score
Win	1989	Wimbledon	Grass	(United States) Jonathan Stark	(South Africa) John-Laffnie de Jager (South Africa) Wayne Ferreira	7–6^{(7–4)}, 7–6^{(7–2)}

== ATP career finals ==
=== Singles: 2 (1 title, 1 runner-up) ===
Legend Grand Slam tournaments (0–0) ATP World Tour Finals (0–0) ATP Masters Series (0–0) ATP Championship Series (0–0) ATP World Series (1–1)	Titles by surface Hard (0–1) Clay (1–0) Grass (0–0) Carpet (0–0)	Titles by setting Outdoor (1–1) Indoor (0–0)

Result	W–L	Date	Tournament	Tier	Surface	Opponent	Score
Win	1–0	May 1994	Pinehurst, United States	World Series	Clay	(United States) Todd Martin	6–4, 7–6
Loss	1–1	Oct 1994	Toulouse, France	World Series	Hard (indoors)	(Sweden) Magnus Larsson	1–6, 3–6

=== Doubles: 51 (28 titles, 23 runner-ups) ===
Legend Grand Slam tournaments (2–2) ATP World Tour Finals (0–0) ATP Masters Series (1–6) ATP Championship Series Gold (6–3) ATP World Series (19–12)	Titles by surface Hard (20–9) Clay (3–7) Grass (2–4) Carpet (3-3)	Titles by setting Outdoor (22–20) Indoor (6–3)

Result	W–L	Date	Tournament	Tier	Surface	Partner	Opponents	Score
Win	1–0	Jan 1992	Wellington, New Zealand	World Series	Hard	(United States) Jonathan Stark	(Netherlands) Michiel Schapers (Czech Republic) Daniel Vacek	6–3, 6–3
Loss	1–1	May 1992	Charlotte, United States	World Series	Clay	(United States) Bret Garnett	(United States) Steve Devries (Australia) David Macpherson	4–6, 6–7
Win	2–1	Jul 1992	Washington, United States	Championship Series	Hard	(United States) Bret Garnett	(United States) Ken Flach (United States) Todd Witsken	6–2, 6–3
Loss	2–2	Aug 1992	New Haven, United States	Championship Series	Hard	(United States) Patrick McEnroe	(United States) Rick Leach (United States) Kelly Jones	6–7, 7–6, 2–6
Loss	2–3	Nov 1992	Antwerp, Belgium	World Series	Carpet	(United States) Patrick McEnroe	(Australia) John Fitzgerald (Sweden) Anders Järryd	2–6, 2–6
Loss	2–4	May 1993	Atlanta, United States	World Series	Clay	(United States) Todd Martin	(United States) Paul Annacone (United States) Richey Reneberg	4–6, 6–7
Loss	2–5	May 1993	Tampa, United States	World Series	Clay	(United States) Kelly Jones	(United States) Todd Martin (United States) Derrick Rostagno	3–6, 4–6
Win	3–5	Jan 1994	Auckland, New Zealand	World Series	Hard	(United States) Patrick McEnroe	(Canada) Grant Connell (United States) Patrick Galbraith	6–2, 4–6, 6–4
Win	4–5	Feb 1994	San Jose, United States	World Series	Hard	(United States) Rick Leach	(Zimbabwe) Byron Black (United States) Jonathan Stark	4–6, 6–4, 6–4
Loss	4–6	Feb 1994	Memphis, United States	Championship Series	Hard	(United States) Jim Grabb	(Zimbabwe) Byron Black (United States) Jonathan Stark	6–7, 4–6
Loss	4–7	Feb 1994	Philadelphia, United States	Championship Series	Carpet	(United States) Jim Grabb	(Netherlands) Jacco Eltingh (Netherlands) Paul Haarhuis	3–6, 4–6
Loss	4–8	Mar 1994	Miami, United States	Masters Series	Hard	(The Bahamas) Mark Knowles	(Netherlands) Jacco Eltingh (Netherlands) Paul Haarhuis	6–7, 6–7
Win	5–8	May 1994	Atlanta, United States	World Series	Clay	(United States) Richey Reneberg	(United States) Jim Pugh (United States) Francisco Montana	4–6, 7–6, 6–4
Loss	5–9	May 1994	Pinehurst, United States	World Series	Clay	(United States) Richey Reneberg	(Australia) Todd Woodbridge (Australia) Mark Woodforde	2–6, 6–3, 3–6
Loss	5–10	Jul 1994	Toronto, Canada	Masters Series	Hard	(United States) Patrick McEnroe	(Zimbabwe) Byron Black (United States) Jonathan Stark	4–6, 4–6
Win	6–10	Oct 1994	Basel, Switzerland	World Series	Hard	(United States) Patrick McEnroe	(South Africa) Lan Bale (South Africa) John-Laffnie de Jager	6–3, 7–6
Loss	6–11	Oct 1994	Toulouse, France	World Series	Hard	(United States) Patrick McEnroe	(Netherlands) Menno Oosting (Czech Republic) Daniel Vacek	6–7, 7–6, 3–6
Win	7–11	Jan 1995	Melbourne, Australia	Grand Slam	Hard	(United States) Richey Reneberg	(Canada) Daniel Nestor (The Bahamas) Mark Knowles	6–3, 3–6, 6–3, 6–2
Win	8–11	Feb 1995	Memphis, United States	Championship Series	Hard	(United States) Richey Reneberg	(United States) Tommy Ho (New Zealand) Brett Steven	4–6, 7–6, 6–1
Loss	8–12	May 1995	Atlanta, United States	World Series	Clay	(United States) Richey Reneberg	(Spain) Sergio Casal (Spain) Emilio Sánchez	7–6, 3–6, 6–7
Win	9–12	Oct 1995	Tel Aviv, Israel	World Series	Hard	(United States) Jim Grabb	(United States) Kent Kinnear (United States) David Wheaton	6–4, 7–5
Win	10–12	Nov 1995	Moscow, Russia	World Series	Carpet	(Zimbabwe) Byron Black	(United States) Tommy Ho (New Zealand) Brett Steven	6–4, 3–6, 6–3
Win	11–12	Nov 1998	Moscow, Russia	World Series	Carpet	(United States) Jeff Tarango	(Russia) Yevgeny Kafelnikov (Czech Republic) Daniel Vacek	6–4, 6–7, 6–3
Win	12–12	Jan 1999	Doha, Qatar	World Series	Hard	(United States) Alex O'Brien	(South Africa) Pieter Norval (South Africa) Kevin Ullyett	6–3, 6–4
Loss	12–13	May 1999	Hamburg, Germany	Masters Series	Clay	(Netherlands) Paul Haarhuis	(Australia) Wayne Arthurs (Australia) Andrew Kratzmann	6–2, 6–7, 2–6
Loss	12–14	Jun 1999	Halle, Germany	World Series	Grass	(Netherlands) Paul Haarhuis	(Sweden) Jonas Björkman (Australia) Patrick Rafter	3–6, 5–7
Loss	12–15	Jul 1999	London, United Kingdom	Grand Slam	Grass	(Netherlands) Paul Haarhuis	(India) Mahesh Bhupathi (India) Leander Paes	7–6^{(12–10)}, 3–6, 4–6, 6–7^{(4–7)}
Win	13–15	Aug 1999	Indianapolis, United States	Championship Series	Hard	(Netherlands) Paul Haarhuis	(France) Olivier Delaître (India) Leander Paes	6–3, 6–4
Loss	13–16	Nov 1999	Paris, France	Masters Series	Carpet	(Netherlands) Paul Haarhuis	(Canada) Sébastien Lareau (United States) Alex O'Brien	6–7^{(7–9)}, 5–7
Loss	13–17	Jan 2000	Doha, Qatar	International Series	Hard	(United States) Alex O'Brien	(The Bahamas) Mark Knowles (Belarus) Max Mirnyi	3–6, 4–6
Win	14–17	Mar 2000	Scottsdale, United States	International Series	Hard	(United States) Richey Reneberg	(United States) Patrick Galbraith (Australia) David Macpherson	6–3, 7–5
Win	15–17	Mar 2000	Indian Wells, United States	Masters Series	Hard	(United States) Alex O'Brien	(Netherlands) Paul Haarhuis (Australia) Sandon Stolle	6–4, 7–6^{(7–5)}
Win	16–17	Aug 2000	Washington, United States	Championship Series	Hard	(United States) Alex O'Brien	(United States) Andre Agassi (Armenia) Sargis Sargsian	7–5, 6–1
Win	17–17	Mar 2001	Scottsdale, United States	International Series	Hard	(United States) Donald Johnson	(Chile) Marcelo Ríos (Netherlands) Sjeng Schalken	7–6^{(7–3)}, 6–2
Win	18–17	Apr 2001	Barcelona, Spain	Championship Series	Clay	(United States) Donald Johnson	(Spain) Tommy Robredo (Spain) Fernando Vicente	7–6^{(7–2)}, 6–4
Win	19–17	May 2001	Mallorca, Spain	International Series	Clay	(United States) Donald Johnson	(Spain) Feliciano López (Spain) Francisco Roig	7–5, 6–3
Win	20–17	Jun 2001	Nottingham, United Kingdom	International Series	Grass	(United States) Donald Johnson	(Australia) Paul Hanley (Australia) Andrew Kratzmann	6–4, 6–2
Win	21–17	Jul 2001	London, United Kingdom	Grand Slam	Grass	(United States) Donald Johnson	(Czech Republic) Jiří Novák (Czech Republic) David Rikl	6–4, 4–6, 6–3, 7–6^{(8–6)}
Loss	21–18	Aug 2001	Montreal, Canada	Masters Series	Hard	(United States) Donald Johnson	(Czech Republic) Jiří Novák (Czech Republic) David Rikl	4–6, 6–3, 3–6
Loss	21–19	Sep 2001	New York, United States	Grand Slam	Hard	(United States) Donald Johnson	(Zimbabwe) Wayne Black (Zimbabwe) Kevin Ullyett	6–7^{(9–11)}, 6–2, 3–6
Win	22–19	Oct 2001	Stockholm, Sweden	International Series	Hard	(United States) Donald Johnson	(Australia) Todd Woodbridge (Sweden) Jonas Björkman	6–3, 4–6, 6–3
Win	23–19	Jan 2002	Doha, Qatar	International Series	Hard	(United States) Donald Johnson	(Czech Republic) Jiří Novák (Czech Republic) David Rikl	6–3, 7–6^{(7–5)}
Win	24–19	Jan 2002	Sydney, Australia	International Series	Hard	(United States) Donald Johnson	(Australia) Sandon Stolle (Australia) Joshua Eagle	6–4, 6–4
Loss	24–20	Mar 2002	Miami, United States	Masters Series	Hard	(United States) Donald Johnson	(Canada) Daniel Nestor (The Bahamas) Mark Knowles	3–6, 6–3, 1–6
Loss	24–21	Jun 2002	Nottingham, United Kingdom	International Series	Grass	(United States) Donald Johnson	(The Bahamas) Mark Knowles (United States) Mike Bryan	6–0, 6–7^{(3–7)}, 4–6
Win	25–21	Oct 2002	St. Petersburg, Russia	International Series	Hard	(South Africa) David Adams	(Georgia (country)) Irakli Labadze (Russia) Marat Safin	7–6^{(10–8)}, 6–3
Loss	25–22	May 2003	Munich, Germany	International Series	Clay	(Australia) Joshua Eagle	(Zimbabwe) Wayne Black (Zimbabwe) Kevin Ullyett	3–6, 5–7
Loss	25–23	Jun 2003	Nottingham, United Kingdom	International Series	Grass	(Australia) Joshua Eagle	(United States) Bob Bryan (United States) Mike Bryan	6–7^{(3–7)}, 6–4, 6–7^{(4–7)}
Win	26–23	Feb 2004	Milan, Italy	International Series	Carpet	(Czech Republic) Pavel Vízner	(Italy) Daniele Bracciali (Italy) Giorgio Galimberti	6–4, 6–4
Win	27–23	Oct 2004	Shanghai, China	International Series	Hard	(Czech Republic) Pavel Vízner	(United States) Rick Leach (United States) Brian Macphie	4–6, 7–6^{(7–4)}, 7–6^{(13–11)}
Win	28–23	Oct 2004	Tokyo, Japan	Championship Series	Hard	(Czech Republic) Pavel Vízner	(Czech Republic) Jiří Novák (Czech Republic) Petr Pála	5–1 ret.

== ATP Challenger and ITF Futures finals ==
=== Singles: 5 (2–3) ===
Legend ATP Challenger (2–3) ITF Futures (0–0)	Finals by surface Hard (1–3) Clay (0–0) Grass (0–0) Carpet (1–0)

Result	W–L	Date	Tournament	Tier	Surface	Opponent	Score
Win	1–0	Sep 1992	Fairfield, United States	Challenger	Hard	(United States) Alex O'Brien	7–6, 6–2
Loss	1–1	Oct 1992	Monterrey, Mexico	Challenger	Hard	(United States) Alex O'Brien	2–6, 4–6
Loss	1–2	Feb 1993	Indian Wells, United States	Challenger	Hard	(Australia) Jason Stoltenberg	2–6, 1–6
Loss	1–3	Sep 1993	Fairfield, United States	Challenger	Hard	(United States) Steve Devries	4–6, 6–4, 2–6
Win	2–3	Oct 1998	Eckental, Germany	Challenger	Carpet	(Austria) Wolfgang Schranz	7–6, 6–2

=== Doubles: 11 (9–2) ===
Legend ATP Challenger (9–2) ITF Futures (0–0)	Finals by surface Hard (6–0) Clay (3–1) Grass (0–1) Carpet (0–0)

Result	W–L	Date	Tournament	Tier	Surface	Partner	Opponents	Score
Win	1–0	Sep 1992	Fairfield, United States	Challenger	Hard	(United States) Jim Pugh	(United States) Steve Devries (United States) Ted Scherman	6–4, 7–6
Win	2–0	Oct 1992	Ponte Vedra, United States	Challenger	Hard	(United States) Jim Pugh	(Venezuela) Nicolás Pereira (Czech Republic) Daniel Vacek	1–6, 6–3, 6–2
Win	3–0	Sep 1993	Fairfield, United States	Challenger	Hard	(United States) Alex O'Brien	(United States) Matt Lucena (United States) Brian Macphie	6–3, 7–5
Loss	3–1	Dec 1993	Naples, United States	Challenger	Clay	(The Bahamas) Mark Knowles	(United States) Jim Pugh (United States) Francisco Montana	6–7, 6–3, 4–6
Win	4–1	Dec 1993	Paget, Bermuda	Challenger	Clay	(The Bahamas) Mark Knowles	(Venezuela) Maurice Ruah (Venezuela) Nicolás Pereira	6–1, 6–3
Win	5–1	Mar 1996	Agadir, Morocco	Challenger	Clay	(South Africa) Christo van Rensburg	(Sweden) Patrik Fredriksson (Sweden) Magnus Norman	3–6, 6–3, 6–2
Win	6–1	May 1997	Bratislava, Slovakia	Challenger	Clay	(South Africa) Christo van Rensburg	(Spain) Joan Balcells (United States) Devin Bowen	4–6, 6–3, 7–5
Win	7–1	Aug 1998	Bronx, United States	Challenger	Hard	(Japan) Takao Suzuki	(Czech Republic) Ota Fukárek (Romania) Gabriel Trifu	6–1, 6–2
Win	8–1	Sep 1998	Urbana, United States	Challenger	Hard	(United States) Jonathan Stark	(United States) Doug Flach (United States) Mark Merklein	6–4, 7–6
Win	9–1	Oct 1998	Dallas, United States	Challenger	Hard	(United States) Jonathan Stark	(Australia) Michael Hill (United States) Scott Humphries	6–3, 6–4
Loss	9–2	Jun 2000	Surbiton, United Kingdom	Challenger	Grass	(United States) Jonathan Stark	(South Africa) Jeff Coetzee (South Africa) Marcos Ondruska	6–7^{(3–7)}, 6–7^{(6–8)}

== Performance timelines ==
Key
W	F	SF	QF	#R	RR	Q#	DNQ	A	NH

(W) winner; (F) finalist; (SF) semifinalist; (QF) quarterfinalist; (#R) rounds 4, 3, 2, 1; (RR) round-robin stage; (Q#) qualification round; (DNQ) did not qualify; (A) absent; (NH) not held; (SR) strike rate (events won / competed); (W–L) win–loss record.

=== Singles ===
Tournament	1988	1989	1990	1991	1992	1993	1994	1995	1996	1997	1998	1999	2000	SR	W–L	Win %
Grand Slam tournaments
Australian Open	A	A	A	A	1R	A	2R	1R	A	A	A	Q2	Q1	0 / 3	1–3	25%
French Open	A	A	A	A	A	Q2	2R	2R	1R	Q1	A	Q1	A	0 / 3	2–3	40%
Wimbledon	A	A	Q1	A	Q1	2R	1R	3R	2R	A	Q2	Q2	A	0 / 4	4–4	50%
US Open	2R	2R	A	1R	2R	2R	1R	4R	2R	A	1R	Q1	A	0 / 9	8–9	47%
Win–loss	1–1	1–1	0–0	0–1	1–2	2–2	2–4	6–4	2–3	0–0	0–1	0–0	0–0	0 / 19	15–19	44%
ATP Tour Masters 1000
Indian Wells Masters	A	A	A	A	A	2R	A	2R	A	A	A	A	A	0 / 2	2–2	50%
Miami Open	A	A	A	A	A	1R	3R	3R	A	A	A	A	A	0 / 3	3–3	50%
Rome	A	A	A	A	A	A	A	1R	A	A	A	A	A	0 / 1	0–1	0%
Canada Masters	A	A	A	A	A	1R	1R	A	A	A	A	A	A	0 / 2	0–2	0%
Cincinnati Masters	A	A	A	A	A	Q1	1R	1R	A	A	A	Q1	A	0 / 2	0–2	0%
Paris Masters	A	A	A	A	A	3R	A	Q1	A	A	A	A	A	0 / 1	2–1	67%
Win–loss	0–0	0–0	0–0	0–0	0–0	3–4	2–3	2–4	0–0	0–0	0–0	0–0	0–0	0 / 11	7–11	39%

=== Doubles ===
Tournament	1988	1989	1990	1991	1992	1993	1994	1995	1996	1997	1998	1999	2000	2001	2002	2003	2004	2005	SR	W–L	Win %
Grand Slam tournaments
Australian Open	A	A	A	A	QF	A	1R	W	A	A	A	2R	SF	A	SF	QF	1R	1R	1 / 9	21–8	72%
French Open	A	A	A	A	2R	3R	1R	2R	SF	A	A	2R	1R	1R	2R	3R	2R	1R	0 / 12	13–12	52%
Wimbledon	A	Q1	A	A	2R	1R	A	3R	2R	A	Q1	F	QF	W	SF	3R	3R	1R	1 / 11	26–10	72%
US Open	1R	1R	A	3R	1R	1R	QF	1R	2R	A	1R	1R	SF	F	QF	3R	3R	2R	0 / 16	23–16	59%
Win–loss	0–1	0–1	0–0	2–1	5–4	2–3	3–3	9–3	6–3	0–0	0–1	7–4	11–4	11–2	12–4	9–4	5–4	1–4	2 / 48	83–46	64%
National representation
Summer Olympics	A	Not Held			A	Not Held			A	Not Held			2R	Not Held			A	NH	0 / 1	0–1	0%
Year-end championships
Tennis Masters Cup	A	A	A	A	A	A	A	A	A	A	A	RR	RR	SF	A	A	A	A	0 / 3	4–6	40%
ATP Tour Masters 1000
Indian Wells Masters	A	A	A	A	1R	QF	1R	1R	A	Q1	A	2R	W	QF	SF	2R	A	1R	1 / 10	12–9	57%
Miami Open	A	A	A	A	1R	QF	F	QF	A	A	A	1R	QF	1R	F	A	2R	1R	0 / 10	16–10	62%
Monte Carlo	A	A	A	A	A	A	A	A	A	A	A	1R	SF	QF	SF	2R	QF	1R	0 / 7	10–7	59%
Rome	A	A	A	A	A	A	A	1R	A	A	A	2R	2R	A	QF	QF	2R	1R	0 / 7	6–7	46%
Hamburg	A	A	A	A	A	A	A	A	A	A	A	F	1R	QF	2R	2R	1R	A	0 / 6	8–6	57%
Canada Masters	A	A	A	A	A	QF	F	A	A	A	A	QF	2R	F	QF	A	QF	A	0 / 7	14–7	67%
Cincinnati Masters	A	A	A	A	A	QF	SF	QF	A	A	A	QF	1R	2R	QF	1R	SF	A	0 / 9	14–9	61%
Stuttgart	A	A	A	A	A	A	A	A	A	A	A	2R	2R	2R	Not Held				0 / 3	0–3	0%
Madrid	Not Held														QF	SF	1R	A	0 / 3	4–3	57%
Paris Masters	A	A	A	A	2R	Q1	QF	1R	A	A	A	F	SF	QF	2R	1R	1R	A	0 / 9	8–9	47%
Win–loss	0–0	0–0	0–0	0–0	1–3	9–4	9–5	4–5	0–0	0–0	0–0	12–9	13–8	12–8	18–9	5–7	8–8	0–4	1 / 71	92–70	57%

=== Mixed doubles ===
Tournament	1989	1990	1991	1992	1993	1994	1995	1996	1997	1998	1999	2000	2001	2002	2003	2004	2005	SR	W–L	Win %
Grand Slam tournaments
Australian Open	A	A	A	A	A	A	A	A	A	A	A	W	A	1R	QF	1R	A	1 / 4	7–3	70%
French Open	A	A	A	QF	A	A	A	A	A	A	A	A	2R	SF	2R	A	QF	0 / 5	10–5	67%
Wimbledon	A	A	A	A	A	A	A	A	A	A	A	3R	1R	3R	2R	1R	2R	0 / 6	5–6	45%
US Open	1R	A	1R	A	A	A	A	A	A	A	2R	W	QF	A	2R	2R	A	1 / 7	10–6	63%
Win–loss	0–1	0–0	0–1	3–1	0–0	0–0	0–0	0–0	0–0	0–0	1–1	12–1	3–3	5–3	5–4	1–3	2–2	2 / 22	32–20	62%
