= Arvind Parmar =

British tennis player

- Country (sports): (United Kingdom) Great Britain
- Residence: London, England
- Born: 22 March 1978 (age 48) Hitchin, England
- Height: 1.93 m (6 ft 4 in)
- Turned pro: 1997
- Retired: December 2006
- Plays: Right-handed
- Coach: David Sammel
- Prize money: $519,643

Singles
- Career record: 15–30
- Career titles: 0
- Highest ranking: No. 137 (26 June 2000)

Grand Slam singles results
- Australian Open: 1R (2000)
- French Open: Q1 (2000, 2001, 2002, 2003, 2006)
- Wimbledon: 2R (1999, 2000, 2001)
- US Open: Q3 (2003)

Doubles
- Career record: 6–17
- Career titles: 0
- Highest ranking: No. 218 (21 July 2003)

Grand Slam doubles results
- Wimbledon: 2R (1998)

Arvind Parmar (born 1978 in Hitchin, Hertfordshire) is a former British professional tennis player whose career ran from 1997 to 2006. After retiring, he coached British junior No. 1, Ahmed El Menshawy. He also coached another British junior, James Marsalek.

== Tour career ==
=== 1996 ===
Parmar competed in his first ATP tour event in Bournemouth in September 1996, in doubles. Partnering Paul Robinson, they lost in the first round in 3 sets. Parmar finished 1996 ranked World No. 720 in singles and No. 1081 in doubles.

=== 1997 ===
Parmar played his first tour singles matches in July, 1997, playing in two challenger events in Britain, Bristol and Manchester. Both played on grass, he lost rather handily in the first round of each event. Parmar also lost in the first round in both events in doubles. He won his first tour event in September as he and partner Jamie Delgado reached the second round in doubles at the Scottish Tennis Championships. He finished 1997 ranked World No. 464 in singles and No. 608 in doubles.

=== 1998 ===
Parmar played 12 Futures events in 1998 in singles, going 14 wins, 12 losses. His best result in these tournaments was a semi-finals result at Great Britain F7, played in Sunderland. He went 1 and 4 in challengers, reaching the second round of the Ahmedabad Challenger in December. In doubles play, Parmar reached 3 Futures semi-finals as well as the second round of Wimbledon, in his first grand slam appearance, partnering Luke Milligan. Parmar's peak ranking for 1998 was World No. 394 in singles, received in October, and No. 370 in doubles in August.

=== 1999–2002 ===
Parmar qualified for Wimbledon in 1999 beating the no. 25 ranked player in the world, Albert Costa (ESP) W 0–6, 7–6^{(5)}, 6–3, 6–3 before losing to compatriot Greg Rusedski. During this three-year period under the guidance of his coach David Sammel he made the second round of Wimbledon three years in a row and qualified for the 2000 Australian Open. He was selected for the UK Davis Cup team regularly from 2000 to 2006.

=== 2006 ===
==== Rotterdam Open, Rotterdam ====
Parmar lost in the second qualifying round in Rotterdam only to be given a lucky loser spot. He went on to beat top 100 player Paradorn Srichaphan in the 1st round, 7–6^{(3)}, 5–7, 7–6^{(7)}. In the second round he beat Dominik Meffert who was the player who beat Parmar in the qualifying round, 6–3, 6–3. Parmar's good run ended in his quarter-final match against Christophe Rochus, losing in straight sets, 6–3, 6–3.

==== Davis Cup Euro-Asia Group One, vs Serbia and Montenegro ====
As Andy Murray was injured and could not play in the 1st day's play, Parmar took his place in the 1st rubber of the tie against Serbia and Montenegro against Novak Djokovic and Parmar lost in straight sets 6–3, 6–2, 7–5.

Parmar also played in the last rubber as Serbia and Montenegro won the tie as Novak Djokovic beat Greg Rusedski in the previous rubber so making the final rubber a dead-rubber as it gave Serbia & Montenegro an unassailable 3–1 lead. So therefore Andy Murray did not play. Parmar did well, although the Davis Cup tie was already decided, winning in straight sets over Ilija Bozoljac 7–5, 6–4.

== Tour finals ==
=== Singles (2–5) ===
Legend
Grand Slam (0)
ATP Masters Series (0)
ATP Tour (0)
Challengers (2–5)

Result	No.	Date	Tournament	Surface	Opponent	Score
Loss	1.	5 March 2000	Singapore, Singapore	Hard	(Australia) Todd Woodbridge	3–6, 3–6
Loss	2.	12 March 2000	Kyoto, Japan	Carpet	(Zimbabwe) Kevin Ullyett	7–6, 4–6, 4–6
Loss	3.	24 February 2002	Hull, United Kingdom	Carpet	(Russia) Denis Golovanov	4–6, 1–3 (ret)
Loss	4.	3 November 2002	Nottingham, United Kingdom	Clay	(Belgium) Gilles Elseneer	5–7, 2–6
Loss	5.	23 February 2003	Wolfsburg, Germany	Carpet	(Germany) Axel Pretzsch	7–6, 6–7, 4–6
Win	6.	3 August 2003	Denver, USA	Hard	(United States) Jeff Salzenstein	6–4, 6–4
Win	7.	29 February 2004	Ho Chi Minh City, Vietnam	Hard	(Chinese Taipei) Yen-Hsun Lu	6–3, 6–7, 6–3

== Post-playing career ==
Parmar has been a coach for some top junior British players. In addition, he worked as a television analyst for Eurosport 2 for the 2011 U.S. Open (if not other telecasts).
