= Nottingham Tennis Centre =

Tennis venue in Nottingham, England

Coordinates: 52°56′4″N 1°11′24″W

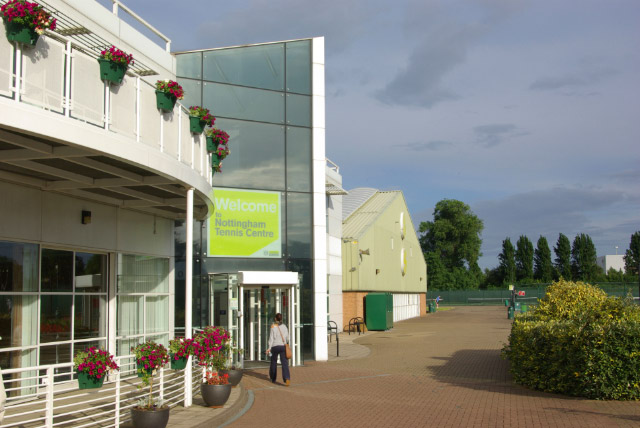
Nottingham Tennis Centre

Nottingham Tennis Centre is a tennis venue in Nottingham, England. The centre holds a range of tournaments throughout the year, such as the Nottingham Open, which is held before The Championships, Wimbledon.

The Jack Britton Trophy tournament is held at the Tennis Centre every year, named after Jack Britton (1911–2005).

British Davis Cup champion Dan Evans has frequently trained here with LTA coaches Mark Hilton and Leighton Alfred.
