= 1996 Nottingham Open =

- Date: 17–23 June
- Edition: 7th
- Category: World Series
- Surface: Grass court / outdoor
- Location: Nottingham, United Kingdom
- Venue: Nottingham Tennis Centre

Champions

Singles
- (Netherlands) Jan Siemerink

Doubles
- (United Kingdom) Mark Petchey / (United Kingdom) Danny Sapsford
← 1995 ·	Nottingham Open	· 1997 →

The 1996 Nottingham Open was a men's tennis tournament played on grass courts at the Nottingham Tennis Centre in Nottingham in the United Kingdom and was part of the World Series of the 1996 ATP Tour. It was the seventh edition of the tournament and was held from 17 June through 23 June 1996. Fifth-seeded Jan Siemerink won the singles title.

== Finals ==
=== Singles ===
(Netherlands) Jan Siemerink defeated (Australia) Sandon Stolle 6–3, 7–6^{(7–0)}

- It was Siemerink's only singles title of the year and the 2nd of his career.

=== Doubles ===
(United Kingdom) Mark Petchey / (United Kingdom) Danny Sapsford defeated (United Kingdom) Neil Broad / (South Africa) Piet Norval 6–7, 7–6, 6–4

- It was Petchey's only title of the year and the 1st of his career. It was Sapsford's only title of the year and the 1st of his career.
