= 1996 Nottingham Open – Singles =

Singles
- 1996 Nottingham Open

Final
- Champion: (Netherlands) Jan Siemerink
- Runner-up: (Australia) Sandon Stolle
- Score: 6–3, 7–6^{(7–0)}

Details
- Draw: 32
- Seeds: 8

Events
Singles	Doubles
← 1995 ·	Nottingham Open	· 1997 →

Javier Frana was the defending champion but lost in the first round to Marc-Kevin Goellner.

Jan Siemerink won in the final 6–3, 7–6^{(7–0)} against Sandon Stolle.

== Seeds ==
1. (France) Cédric Pioline (first round)
2. (Spain) Albert Costa (first round)
3. (United States) MaliVai Washington (first round)
4. (Australia) Mark Woodforde (first round)
5. (Netherlands) Jan Siemerink (champion)
6. (Australia) Todd Woodbridge (semifinals)
7. (Australia) Jason Stoltenberg (first round)
8. (Spain) Àlex Corretja (second round)

== Draw ==
=== Key ===
- Q = Qualifier
- WC = Wild card
- LL = Lucky loser
- Alt = Alternate
- SE = Special exempt
- PR = Protected ranking
- ITF = ITF entry
- JE = Junior exempt
- w/o = Walkover
- r = Retired
- d = Defaulted
- SR = Special ranking

=== Finals ===
Semifinals
(Australia) Sandon Stolle	6	6
6	(Australia) Todd Woodbridge	2	4
5	(Netherlands) Jan Siemerink	7^{7}	6
(United Kingdom) Greg Rusedski	6^{4}	3

Final
(Australia) Sandon Stolle	3	6^{0}
5	(Netherlands) Jan Siemerink	6	7^{7}

=== Top half ===
First round
1	(France) C Pioline	2	7^{7}	3
(Russia) A Volkov	6	6^{4}	6
(Australia) S Stolle	6	6
(Belgium) J van Herck	1	2
(Venezuela) N Pereira	2	1
WC	(United Kingdom) M Petchey	6	6
(Australia) P Rafter	6	6
7	(Australia) J Stoltenberg	2	1
4	(Australia) M Woodforde	2	6^{4}
(United States) V Spadea	6	7^{7}
(Slovakia) K Kučera	4	6^{4}
Q	(The Bahamas) M Knowles	6	7^{7}
(Ecuador) N Lapentti	5	5
Q	(United States) C Woodruff	7	7
(Denmark) K Carlsen	6	0	1
6	(Australia) T Woodbridge	2	6	6

Second round
(Russia) A Volkov	4	3
(Australia) S Stolle	6	6
WC	(United Kingdom) M Petchey	6	6
(Australia) P Rafter	3	4
(United States) V Spadea	7^{7}	6
Q	(The Bahamas) M Knowles	6^{4}	4
(United States) C Woodruff	5	4
6	(Australia) T Woodbridge	7	6

Quarterfinals
(Australia) S Stolle	3	7^{8}	6
WC	(United Kingdom) M Petchey	6	6^{6}	3
(United States) V Spadea	4	4
6	(Australia) T Woodbridge	6	6

Semifinals
(Australia) S Stolle	6	6
6	(Australia) T Woodbridge	2	4

=== Bottom half ===
First round
5	(Netherlands) J Siemerink	6	6
Q	(Russia) A Olhovskiy	3	3
(Argentina) J Frana	6^{7}	7^{8}	3
(Germany) M-K Goellner	7^{9}	6^{6}	6
WC	(United Kingdom) D Sapsford	3	4
(United States) M Joyce	6	6
(United Kingdom) T Henman	6	7
3	(United States) M Washington	3	5
8	(Spain) À Corretja	6	6
Q	(South Africa) R Koenig	3	4
(France) S Simian	4	6^{9}
(Japan) S Matsuoka	6	7^{11}
(Czech Republic) M Damm	7^{11}	7
WC	(United Kingdom) C Wilkinson	6^{9}	5
(United Kingdom) G Rusedski	6	6
2	(Spain) A Costa	1	4

Second round
5	(Netherlands) J Siemerink	2	7^{8}	6
(Germany) M-K Goellner	6	6^{6}	3
(United States) M Joyce	7^{7}	5	2
(United Kingdom) T Henman	6^{2}	7	6
8	(Spain) À Corretja	4	2
(Japan) S Matsuoka	6	6
(Czech Republic) M Damm	3	6^{4}
(United Kingdom) G Rusedski	6	7^{7}

Quarterfinals
5	(Netherlands) J Siemerink	7^{7}	6^{5}	6
(United Kingdom) T Henman	6^{5}	7^{7}	1
(Japan) S Matsuoka	6^{5}	7	4
(United Kingdom) G Rusedski	7^{7}	5	6

Semifinals
5	(Netherlands) J Siemerink	7^{7}	6
(United Kingdom) G Rusedski	6^{4}	3
