= 1995 Nottingham Open – Singles =

Singles
- 1995 Nottingham Open

Final
- Champion: (Argentina) Javier Frana
- Runner-up: (Australia) Todd Woodbridge
- Score: 7–6^{(7–4)}, 6–3

Details
- Draw: 32
- Seeds: 8

Events
Singles	Doubles
← 1977 ·	Nottingham Open	· 1996 →

Javier Frana defeated Todd Woodbridge 7–6^{(7–4)}, 6–3 in the final to secure the title.

== Seeds ==
1. (Sweden) Thomas Enqvist (second round)
2. (Sweden) Jonas Björkman (first round)
3. (Australia) Mark Woodforde (semifinals)
4. (Russia) Alexander Volkov (quarterfinals)
5. (United States) MaliVai Washington (second round)
6. (Australia) Patrick Rafter (second round)
7. (Australia) Todd Woodbridge (final)
8. (Chile) Marcelo Ríos (second round)

== Draw ==
=== Key ===
- Q = Qualifier
- WC = Wild card
- LL = Lucky loser
- Alt = Alternate
- SE = Special exempt
- PR = Protected ranking
- ITF = ITF entry
- JE = Junior exempt
- w/o = Walkover
- r = Retired
- d = Defaulted
- SR = Special ranking

=== Finals ===
Semifinals
(Zimbabwe) Byron Black	6^{2}	5
(Argentina) Javier Frana	7^{7}	7
3	(Australia) Mark Woodforde	3	6	4
7	(Australia) Todd Woodbridge	6	2	6

Final
(Argentina) Javier Frana	7^{7}	6
7	(Australia) Todd Woodbridge	6^{4}	3

=== Section 1 ===
First round
1	(Sweden) T Enqvist	6	6
Q	(United Kingdom) C Beecher	2	3
(Sweden) J Apell	6^{4}	3
(Zimbabwe) B Black	7^{7}	6
(United States) T Ho	6	6
Q	(United Kingdom) N Gould	3	3
(France) C Pioline	2	5
8	(Chile) M Ríos	6	7
4	(Russia) A Volkov	7	7
(United Kingdom) J Bates	5	5
(United States) J Stark	7^{7}	6^{0}	4
(Italy) G Pozzi	6^{5}	7^{7}	6
(Argentina) J Frana	6	7^{7}
(United Kingdom) G Rusedski	3	6^{4}
(United States) B Shelton	7^{7}	1	2
6	(Australia) P Rafter	6^{3}	6	6

Second round
1	(Sweden) T Enqvist	7	3	6^{8}
(Zimbabwe) B Black	5	6	7^{10}
(United States) T Ho	6	6
8	(Chile) M Ríos	4	0
4	(Russia) A Volkov	6	4	6
(Italy) G Pozzi	3	6	4
(Argentina) J Frana	6	7^{7}
6	(Australia) P Rafter	2	6^{4}

Quarterfinals
(Zimbabwe) B Black	6	6
(United States) T Ho	3	4
4	(Russia) A Volkov	3	6^{3}
(Argentina) J Frana	6	7^{7}

Semifinals
(Zimbabwe) B Black	6^{2}	5
(Argentina) J Frana	7^{7}	7

=== Section 2 ===
First round
5	(United States) M Washington	6	6
(France) L Roux	4	2
(United States) J Palmer	6	4	3
Q	(Japan) S Matsuoka	4	6	6
(Denmark) K Carlsen	6	6
(Slovakia) K Kučera	2	2
Q	(United Kingdom) C Wilkinson	6^{4}	6	3
3	(Australia) M Woodforde	7^{7}	2	6
7	(Australia) T Woodbridge	6	3	6
(Germany) O Gross	2	6	3
WC	(United Kingdom) D Sapsford	7	6^{5}	3
(France) G Raoux	5	7^{7}	6
WC	(United Kingdom) M Petchey	6	3	1
(Czech Republic) M Damm	3	6	6
WC	(United Kingdom) T Henman	7^{9}	7
2	(Sweden) J Björkman	6^{7}	5

Second round
5	(United States) M Washington	2	6^{4}
Q	(Japan) S Matsuoka	6	7^{7}
(Denmark) K Carlsen	4	2
3	(Australia) M Woodforde	6	6
7	(Australia) T Woodbridge	6	7^{7}
(France) G Raoux	3	6^{1}
(Czech Republic) M Damm
WC	(United Kingdom) T Henman	w/o

Quarterfinals
Q	(Japan) S Matsuoka	7^{7}	6^{8}	6^{4}
3	(Australia) M Woodforde	6^{3}	7^{10}	7^{7}
7	(Australia) T Woodbridge	6	7^{7}
WC	(United Kingdom) T Henman	3	6^{4}

Semifinals
3	(Australia) M Woodforde	6	2	6
7	(Australia) T Woodbridge	3	6	4
