= 2013 Nottingham Challenge =

- Date: 10–16 June
- Edition: 3rd
- Draw: 32S / 16D
- Prize money: €64,000 (men) $50,000 (women)
- Surface: Grass
- Location: Nottingham, United Kingdom

Champions

Men's singles
- (United States) Steve Johnson

Women's singles
- (United Kingdom) Elena Baltacha

Men's doubles
- (Thailand) Sanchai Ratiwatana / (Thailand) Sonchat Ratiwatana

Women's doubles
- (France) Julie Coin / (France) Stéphanie Foretz Gacon
← 2012 ·	Nottingham Challenge	· 2014 →

The 2013 Nottingham Challenge (known for sponsorship reasons as the Aegon Nottingham Challenge) was a professional tennis tournament played on outdoor grass courts. It was the third edition of the tournament which was part of the 2013 ATP Challenger Tour and the 2013 ITF Women's Circuit. It took place in Nottingham, United Kingdom, on 10–16 June 2013.

== ATP entrants ==
=== Singles ===
==== Seeds ====
Country	Player	Rank^{1}	Seed
RUS	Alex Bogomolov, Jr.	85	1
ARG	Martín Alund	100	2
CAN	Vasek Pospisil	103	3
USA	Tim Smyczek	115	4
USA	Jack Sock	118	5
UKR	Illya Marchenko	120	6
AUS	Matthew Ebden	122	7
JPN	Go Soeda	124	8

- ^{1} Rankings as of 27 May 2013

==== Other entrants ====
The following players received wildcards into the singles main draw:

- (United Kingdom) Richard Gabb
- (United Kingdom) Joshua Milton
- (United Kingdom) David Rice
- (United Kingdom) Daniel Smethurst

The following players received entry from the qualifying draw:

- (Switzerland) Adrien Bossel
- (United Kingdom) George Coupland
- (United Kingdom) Brydan Klein
- (United Kingdom) Joshua Ward-Hibbert

The following player received entry as a lucky loser:

- (Belarus) Dzmitry Zhyrmont

=== Doubles ===
==== Seeds ====
Country	Player	Country	Player	Rank^{1}	Seed
BRA	Marcelo Demoliner	USA	Nicholas Monroe	157	1
THA	Sanchai Ratiwatana	THA	Sonchat Ratiwatana	158	2
GBR	Jamie Delgado	AUS	Matthew Ebden	166	3
IND	Purav Raja	IND	Divij Sharan	217	4

- ^{1} Rankings as of 27 May 2013

==== Other entrants ====
The following pairs received wildcards into the doubles main draw:

- (Italy) Flavio Cipolla / (Canada) Filip Peliwo
- (United Kingdom) David Rice / (United Kingdom) Sean Thornley
- (United Kingdom) Ken Skupski / (United Kingdom) Neal Skupski

== WTA entrants ==
=== Seeds ===
Country	Player	Rank^{1}	Seed
JPN	Misaki Doi	82	1
CRO	Petra Martić	108	2
FRA	Stéphanie Foretz Gacon	126	3
ITA	Nastassja Burnett	132	4
CZE	Barbora Záhlavová-Strýcová	138	5
FRA	Claire Feuerstein	139	6
SLO	Tadeja Majerič	143	7
ISR	Julia Glushko	149	8

- ^{1} Rankings as of 27 May 2013

=== Other entrants ===
The following players received wildcards into the singles main draw:

- (United Kingdom) Elena Baltacha
- (United Kingdom) Naomi Broady
- (United Kingdom) Samantha Murray
- (United Kingdom) Lisa Whybourn

The following players received entry from the qualifying draw:

- (Thailand) Noppawan Lertcheewakarn
- (Japan) Miki Miyamura
- (Spain) Sara Sorribes Tormo
- (United Kingdom) Emily Webley-Smith

== Champions ==
=== Men's singles ===
- (United States) Steve Johnson def. (Belgium) Ruben Bemelmans 7–5, 7–5

=== Women's singles ===
- (United Kingdom) Elena Baltacha def. (Slovenia) Tadeja Majerič 7–5, 7–6^{(9–7)}

=== Men's doubles ===
- (Thailand) Sanchai Ratiwatana / (Thailand) Sonchat Ratiwatana def. (India) Purav Raja / (India) Divij Sharan, 7–6^{(7–5)}, 6–7^{(3–7)}, [10–8]

=== Women's doubles ===
- (France) Julie Coin / (France) Stéphanie Foretz Gacon def. (Israel) Julia Glushko / (Japan) Erika Sema 6–2, 6–4
