= 1995 Nottingham Open =

- Date: 19–25 June
- Edition: 6th
- Category: World Series
- Draw: 32S / 16D
- Prize money: $303,000
- Surface: Grass court / outdoor
- Location: Nottingham, United Kingdom

Champions

Singles
- (Argentina) Javier Frana

Doubles
- (United States) Luke Jensen / (United States) Murphy Jensen
| ← 1977 · | Nottingham Open | · 1996 → |

The 1995 Nottingham Open was a men's ATP tennis tournament held in Nottingham, Great Britain and played on outdoor grass courts. The event was part of the World Series of the 1995 ATP Tour. It was the sixth edition of the tournament and was held from 19 to 25 June 1995.

Unseeded Javier Frana won his first title of the year and third of his career.

== Finals ==
=== Singles ===
(Argentina) Javier Frana defeated (Australia) Todd Woodbridge, 7–6^{(7–4)}, 6–3

=== Doubles ===
(United States) Luke Jensen / (United States) Murphy Jensen defeated (United States) Patrick Galbraith / (South Africa) Danie Visser 6–3, 5–7, 6–4
