= 2014 Nottingham Challenge =

- Date: 9–15 June
- Edition: 4th
- Category: ATP Challenger Tour; ITF Women's Circuit
- Prize money: €64,000 (men) $50,000 (women)
- Surface: Grass
- Location: Nottingham, United Kingdom

Champions

Men's singles
- (Australia) Nick Kyrgios

Women's singles
- (Australia) Jarmila Gajdošová

Men's doubles
- (Australia) Rameez Junaid / (New Zealand) Michael Venus

Women's doubles
- (Australia) Jarmila Gajdošová / (Australia) Arina Rodionova
← 2013 ·	Nottingham Challenge	· 2015 →

The 2014 Nottingham Challenge (known for sponsorship reasons as the Aegon Nottingham Challenge) was a professional tennis tournament played on outdoor grass courts. It was the fourth edition of the tournament and part of the 2014 ATP Challenger Tour and the 2014 ITF Women's Circuit, offering a total of €64,000 for the men and $50,000 for the women in prize money. It took place in Nottingham, United Kingdom, on 9–15 June 2014.

The men's singles event was won by then-teen Nick Kyrgios, who was awarded a wildcard entrance to the Wimbledon Championship as a result. Jarmila Gajdosova, who won the women's singles, was also awarded a Wimbledon wildcard.

== ATP entrants ==
=== Singles ===
==== Seeds ====
Country	Player	Rank^{1}	Seed
JPN	Go Soeda	103	1
LUX	Gilles Müller	113	2
GER	Andreas Beck	123	3
JPN	Tatsuma Ito	126	4
AUS	Samuel Groth	138	5
JPN	Yūichi Sugita	139	6
ROU	Marius Copil	151	7
USA	Rajeev Ram	157	8

- ^{1} Rankings as of 26 May 2014

==== Other entrants ====
The following players received wildcards into the singles main draw:

- (United Kingdom) Edward Corrie
- (United Kingdom) Kyle Edmund
- (United Kingdom) Oliver Golding
- (United Kingdom) Marcus Willis

The following players received entry as special exempt into the singles main draw:

- (Bulgaria) Dimitar Kutrovsky

The following players use protected ranking to gain entry into the singles main draw:

- (Ukraine) Sergei Bubka

The following players received entry from the qualifying draw:

- (Australia) Nick Kyrgios
- (Austria) Martin Fischer
- (Australia) John-Patrick Smith
- (New Zealand) Michael Venus

=== Doubles ===
==== Seeds ====
Country	Player	Country	Player	Rank^{1}	Seed
AUS	Rameez Junaid	NZL	Michael Venus	146	1
AUS	Paul Hanley	IND	Divij Sharan	157	2
THA	Sanchai Ratiwatana	THA	Sonchat Ratiwatana	167	3
GER	Philipp Marx	GER	Dominik Meffert	206	4

- ^{1} Rankings as of 26 May 2014

==== Other entrants ====
The following pairs received wildcards into the doubles main draw:

- (United Kingdom) Lewis Burton / (United Kingdom) Marcus Willis
- (United Kingdom) David Rice / (United Kingdom) Sean Thornley
- (United Kingdom) Edward Corrie / (United Kingdom) Daniel Smethurst

== WTA entrants ==
=== Singles ===
==== Seeds ====
Country	Player	Rank^{1}	Seed
JPN	Misaki Doi	97	1
GER	Anna-Lena Friedsam	108	2
SUI	Timea Bacsinszky	112	3
CZE	Andrea Hlaváčková	119	4
FRA	Claire Feuerstein	120	5
POL	Magda Linette	123	6
AUS	Olivia Rogowska	124	7
CHN	Zheng Saisai	128	8

- ^{1} Rankings as of 26 May 2014

==== Other entrants ====
The following players received wildcards into the singles main draw:

- (United Kingdom) Katie Boulter
- (United Kingdom) Samantha Murray
- (United Kingdom) Isabelle Wallace
- (United Kingdom) Jade Windley

The following players received entry from the qualifying draw:

- (Australia) Jarmila Gajdošová
- (Japan) Miharu Imanishi
- (Tunisia) Ons Jabeur
- (Estonia) Anett Kontaveit

The following player received entry with a lucky loser:

- (Ukraine) Kateryna Kozlova

=== Doubles ===
==== Seeds ====
Country	Player	Country	Player	Rank^{1}	Seed
JPN	Shuko Aoyama	CZE	Renata Voráčová	126	1
AUS	Monique Adamczak	AUS	Olivia Rogowska	189	2
AUS	Jarmila Gajdošová	AUS	Arina Rodionova	203	3
THA	Noppawan Lertcheewakarn	THA	Tamarine Tanasugarn	241	4

- ^{1} Rankings as of 26 May 2014

==== Other entrants ====
The following pair received wildcards into the doubles main draw:

- (United Kingdom) Katie Boulter / (Japan) Mayo Hibi

== Champions ==
=== Men's singles ===
- (Australia) Nick Kyrgios def. (Australia) Samuel Groth, 7–6^{(7–3)}, 7–6^{(9–7)}

=== Women's singles ===
- (Australia) Jarmila Gajdošová def. (Switzerland) Timea Bacsinszky, 6–2, 6–2

=== Men's doubles ===
- (Australia) Rameez Junaid / (New Zealand) Michael Venus def. (Belgium) Ruben Bemelmans / (Japan) Go Soeda, 4–6, 7–6^{(7–1)}, [10–6]

=== Women's doubles ===
- (Australia) Jarmila Gajdošová / (Australia) Arina Rodionova def. (Paraguay) Verónica Cepede Royg / (Liechtenstein) Stephanie Vogt, 7–6^{(7–0)}, 6–1
