= 2014 Nottingham Challenge – Women's singles =

Women's singles
- 2014 Nottingham Challenge

Final
- Champion: (Australia) Jarmila Gajdošová
- Runner-up: (Switzerland) Timea Bacsinszky
- Score: 6–2, 6–2

Events
Singles	men	women
Doubles	men	women
← 2013 ·	Nottingham Challenge	· 2015 →

Elena Baltacha was the defending champion, but retired at the end of the season and died in May 2014 of liver cancer.

Jarmila Gajdošová won the title, defeating Timea Bacsinszky in the final, 6–2, 6–2.

== Seeds ==
1. (Japan) Misaki Doi (second round)
2. (Germany) Anna-Lena Friedsam (first round)
3. (Switzerland) Timea Bacsinszky (final)
4. (Czech Republic) Andrea Hlaváčková (semifinals)
5. (France) Claire Feuerstein (first round)
6. (Poland) Magda Linette (second round)
7. (Australia) Olivia Rogowska (second round)
8. (China) Zheng Saisai (first round)

== Main draw ==
=== Key ===
- Q = Qualifier
- WC = Wild card
- LL = Lucky loser
- Alt = Alternate
- ITF = ITF entry
- PR = Protected ranking
- SR = Special ranking
- SE = Special exempt
- JE = Junior exempt
- JR = Junior Accelerator Programme entrant
- CO = College Accelerator Programme entrant
- NG = Next Gen Accelerator Program entrant
- w/o = Walkover
- r = Retired
- d = Defaulted

=== Finals ===
Semifinals
(United States) Nicole Gibbs	4	1
3	(Switzerland) Timea Bacsinszky	6	6
4	(Czech Republic) Andrea Hlaváčková	4	4
Q	(Australia) Jarmila Gajdošová	6	6

Final
3	(Switzerland) Timea Bacsinszky	2	2
Q	(Australia) Jarmila Gajdošová	6	6

=== Top half ===
First round
1	(Japan) M Doi	6	7
(Sweden) S Arvidsson	3	5
WC	(United Kingdom) I Wallace	2	2
(United States) N Gibbs	6	6
WC	(United Kingdom) S Murray	6	4	4
(Ukraine) L Tsurenko	2	6	6
(Russia) E Bychkova	6	3	3
7	(Australia) O Rogowska	3	6	6
3	(Switzerland) T Bacsinszky	5	6	6
(Italy) N Burnett	7	4	2
(Liechtenstein) S Vogt	4	6	6^{1}
LL	(Ukraine) K Kozlova	6	3	7^{7}
(Turkey) Ç Büyükakçay	6	2	4
Q	(Japan) M Imanishi	1	6	6
(France) M Johansson	6	6
8	(China) S Zheng	3	1

Second round
1	(Japan) M Doi	5	6	5
(United States) N Gibbs	7	3	7
(Ukraine) L Tsurenko	6	6
7	(Australia) O Rogowska	2	4
3	(Switzerland) T Bacsinszky	4	6	6
LL	(Ukraine) K Kozlova	6	4	2
Q	(Japan) M Imanishi	2	3
(France) M Johansson	6	6

Quarterfinals
(United States) N Gibbs	6	6
(Ukraine) L Tsurenko	4	4
3	(Switzerland) T Bacsinszky	6	3	7^{7}
(France) M Johansson	2	6	6^{3}

Semifinals
(United States) N Gibbs	4	1
3	(Switzerland) T Bacsinszky	6	6

=== Bottom half ===
First round
6	(Poland) M Linette	6	6
WC	(United Kingdom) J Windley	2	3
Q	(Estonia) A Kontaveit	6	6
(United States) M Brengle	1	2
(France) P Parmentier	1	3
(Slovenia) T Majerič	6	6
(Serbia) A Krunić	1	2
4	(Czech Republic) A Hlaváčková	6	6
5	(France) C Feuerstein	2	4
Q	(Tunisia) O Jabeur	6	6
WC	(United Kingdom) K Boulter	6	6
(Paraguay) V Cepede Royg	3	2
(Japan) E Hozumi	7^{7}	4	3
(Russia) M Sirotkina	6^{4}	6	6
Q	(Australia) J Gajdošová	7^{7}	6
2	(Germany) A-L Friedsam	6^{3}	4

Second round
6	(Poland) M Linette	3	4
Q	(Estonia) A Kontaveit	6	6
(Slovenia) T Majerič	1	3
4	(Czech Republic) A Hlaváčková	6	6
Q	(Tunisia) O Jabeur	6	6
WC	(United Kingdom) K Boulter	3	4
(Russia) M Sirotkina	4	6	4
Q	(Australia) J Gajdošová	6	3	6

Quarterfinals
Q	(Estonia) A Kontaveit	7^{7}	0	4
4	(Czech Republic) A Hlaváčková	6^{2}	6	6
Q	(Tunisia) O Jabeur	3	6^{3}
Q	(Australia) J Gajdošová	6	7^{7}

Semifinals
4	(Czech Republic) A Hlaváčková	4	4
Q	(Australia) J Gajdošová	6	6
