= 2015 Nottingham Open =

- Date: 21–27 June (men); 8–15 June (women)
- Edition: 20th (men); 5th (women)
- Draw: 48S / 16D (men); 32S / 16D (women)
- Prize money: €589,160 (men) $250,000 (women)
- Surface: Grass
- Location: Nottingham, United Kingdom
- Venue: Nottingham Tennis Centre

Champions

Men's singles
- (Uzbekistan) Denis Istomin

Women's singles
- (Croatia) Ana Konjuh

Men's doubles
- (Australia) Chris Guccione / (Brazil) André Sá

Women's doubles
- (United States) Raquel Kops-Jones / (United States) Abigail Spears
- Nottingham Open

The 2015 Nottingham Open (known for sponsorship reasons as the Aegon Open Nottingham) was a combined men's and women's tennis tournament played on outdoor grass courts. It was the fifth edition of the event for the women (the first since 1974) and the 20th edition for the men (the first since 2008). It was classified as a WTA International tournament on the 2015 WTA Tour and as an ATP World Tour 250 series tournament on the 2015 ATP World Tour. The event took place at the Nottingham Tennis Centre in Nottingham, United Kingdom from 8 to 15 June 2015 for the women, and from 21 to 27 June 2015 for the men.

== Finals ==
=== Men's singles ===
- (Uzbekistan) Denis Istomin defeated (United States) Sam Querrey, 7–6^{(7–1)}, 7–6^{(8–6)}

=== Women's singles ===
- (Croatia) Ana Konjuh defeated (Romania) Monica Niculescu, 1–6, 6–4, 6–2

=== Men's doubles ===
- (Australia) Chris Guccione / (Brazil) André Sá defeated (Uruguay) Pablo Cuevas / (Spain) David Marrero, 6–2, 7–5

=== Women's doubles ===
- (United States) Raquel Kops-Jones / (United States) Abigail Spears defeated (United Kingdom) Jocelyn Rae / (United Kingdom) Anna Smith, 3–6, 6–3, [11–9]

== ATP singles main-draw entrants ==
=== Seeds ===
Country	Player	Rank^{1}	Seed
ESP	David Ferrer	7	1
FRA	Gilles Simon	13	2
ESP	Feliciano López	14	3
ARG	Leonardo Mayer	22	4
URU	Pablo Cuevas	23	5
SRB	Viktor Troicki	25	6
AUT	Dominic Thiem	29	7
FRA	Adrian Mannarino	32	8
ARG	Juan Mónaco	33	9
SVK	Martin Kližan	35	10
ESP	Pablo Andújar	36	11
USA	Sam Querrey	38	12
BRA	Thomaz Bellucci	40	13
POR	João Sousa	44	14
ITA	Andreas Seppi	45	15
CZE	Jiří Veselý	46	16

- ^{1} Rankings are as of 15 June 2015.

=== Other entrants ===
The following players received wildcards into the main draw:

- (United Kingdom) Kyle Edmund
- (United States) Taylor Harry Fritz
- (United Kingdom) James Ward
- (Germany) Alexander Zverev

The following players received entry from the qualifying draw:

- (Belgium) Ruben Bemelmans
- (Israel) Dudi Sela
- (Japan) Go Soeda
- (Germany) Mischa Zverev

=== Withdrawals ===
Before the tournament

- (Germany) Benjamin Becker →replaced by Lu Yen-hsun
- (France) Julien Benneteau →replaced by Santiago Giraldo
- (France) Jérémy Chardy →replaced by Aljaž Bedene
- (Belgium) David Goffin →replaced by Thomaz Bellucci
- (Australia) Nick Kyrgios →replaced by Alexandr Dolgopolov
- (Luxembourg) Gilles Müller →replaced by Malek Jaziri
- (France) Jo-Wilfried Tsonga →replaced by Tim Smyczek
- (Russia) Mikhail Youzhny →replaced by Denis Istomin

=== Retirements ===
- (Cyprus) Marcos Baghdatis
- (Dominican Republic) Víctor Estrella Burgos
- (Canada) Vasek Pospisil

== ATP doubles main-draw entrants ==
=== Seeds ===
Country	Player	Country	Player	Rank^{1}	Seed
ESP	Marcel Granollers	IND	Leander Paes	36	1
URU	Pablo Cuevas	ESP	David Marrero	52	2
COL	Juan Sebastián Cabal	COL	Robert Farah	61	3
GBR	Dominic Inglot	GBR	Jamie Murray	61	4

- ^{1} Rankings are as of 15 June 2015.

=== Other entrants ===
The following pairs received wildcards into the doubles main draw:

- (United States) Eric Butorac / (United Kingdom) Colin Fleming
- (United Kingdom) Ken Skupski / (United Kingdom) Neal Skupski

The following pair received entry as alternates:

- (Poland) Łukasz Kubot / (Belarus) Max Mirnyi

=== Withdrawals ===
Before the tournament

- (Brazil) Thomaz Bellucci (back injury)

During the tournament

- (Pakistan) Aisam-ul-Haq Qureshi (knee injury)

== WTA singles main-draw entrants ==
=== Seeds ===
Country	Player	Rank^{1}	Seed
POL	Agnieszka Radwańska	14	1
KAZ	Zarina Diyas	32	2
USA	Varvara Lepchenko	34	3
ITA	Karin Knapp	42	4
USA	Alison Riske	47	5
AUS	Casey Dellacqua	48	6
SVK	Magdaléna Rybáriková	57	7
CRO	Ajla Tomljanović	58	8

- ^{1} Rankings are as of 25 May 2015.

=== Other entrants ===
The following players received wildcards into the main draw:

- (United Kingdom) Katy Dunne
- (United Kingdom) Johanna Konta
- (Poland) Agnieszka Radwańska

The following players received entry from the qualifying draw:

- (Australia) Jarmila Gajdošová
- (Belarus) Olga Govortsova
- (Russia) Alla Kudryavtseva
- (United States) Sachia Vickery

=== Retirements ===
- (Belgium) Yanina Wickmayer (Gastrointestinal illness)

=== Withdrawals ===
Before the tournament

- (Germany) Mona Barthel →replaced by Yanina Wickmayer
- (Romania) Alexandra Dulgheru →replaced by Stefanie Vögele
- (Germany) Julia Görges →replaced by Nicole Gibbs
- (China) Peng Shuai →replaced by Shelby Rogers
- (Italy) Roberta Vinci →replaced by Wang Qiang
- (United Kingdom) Heather Watson →replaced by Magda Linette

== WTA doubles main-draw entrants ==
=== Seeds ===
Country	Player	Country	Player	Rank^{1}	Seed
USA	Raquel Kops-Jones	USA	Abigail Spears	30	1
TPE	Chan Yung-jan	CHN	Zheng Jie	52	2
TPE	Chan Hao-ching	RUS	Alla Kudryavtseva	54	3
ZIM	Cara Black	USA	Lisa Raymond	59	4

- ^{1} Rankings are as of 25 May 2015.

=== Other entrants ===
The following pair received a wildcard into the doubles main draw:

- (Czech Republic) Lucie Hradecká / (Italy) Francesca Schiavone
