= 2013 Nottingham Challenge – Women's doubles =

Women's doubles
- 2013 Nottingham Challenge

Final
- Champion: (France) Julie Coin (France) Stéphanie Foretz Gacon
- Runner-up: (Israel) Julia Glushko (Japan) Erika Sema
- Score: 6–2, 6–4

Events
Singles	men	women
Doubles	men	women
← 2012 ·	Nottingham Challenge	· 2014 →

Ashleigh Barty and Sally Peers were the defending champions, having won the event in 2012, but Barty chose to participate in the 2013 Birmingham Classic during that week and Peers chose not to participate.

Julie Coin and Stéphanie Foretz Gacon won the 2013 title, defeating Julia Glushko and Erika Sema in the final, 6–2, 6–4.

== Seeds ==
1. (France) Julie Coin / (France) Stéphanie Foretz Gacon (champions)
2. (Israel) Julia Glushko / (Japan) Erika Sema (final)
3. (Japan) Miki Miyamura / (Thailand) Varatchaya Wongteanchai (semifinals)
4. (Thailand) Noppawan Lertcheewakarn / (China) Xu Yifan (semifinals)

== Draw ==
=== Key ===
- Q = Qualifier
- WC = Wild card
- LL = Lucky loser
- Alt = Alternate
- SE = Special exempt
- PR = Protected ranking
- ITF = ITF entry
- JE = Junior exempt
- w/o = Walkover
- r = Retired
- d = Defaulted
- SR = Special ranking

First round
(Argentina) P Ormaechea (Japan) Y Sema	5	4
(United Kingdom) N Broady (Denmark) M Ejdesgaard	7	6
4	(Thailand) N Lertcheewakarn (China) Y Xu	3	7^{7}	[14]
(United States) M Brengle (Japan) S Ishizu	6	6^{5}	[12]
(Italy) N Burnett (France) I Pavlovic	7	6
(Slovenia) T Majerič (South Africa) C Simmonds	5	2
(Slovakia) AK Schmiedlová (Liechtenstein) S Vogt	6	6^{8}	[5]
(Romania) A Mitu (Croatia) A Vrljić	3	7^{10}	[10]
(United Kingdom) N Slater (United Kingdom) L Whybourn	6	5	[5]
3	(Japan) M Miyamura (Thailand) V Wongteanchai	3	7	[10]
(United Kingdom) S Murray (United Kingdom) J Windley	1	6	[10]
(Canada) S Dubois (Czech Republic) B Záhlavová-Strýcová	6	4	[7]

Quarterfinals
1	(France) J Coin (France) S Foretz Gacon	6	6
(United Kingdom) N Broady (Denmark) M Ejdesgaard	3	4
4	(Thailand) N Lertcheewakarn (China) Y Xu	6	6
(Italy) N Burnett (France) I Pavlovic	3	2
(Romania) A Mitu (Croatia) A Vrljić	3	2
3	(Japan) M Miyamura (Thailand) V Wongteanchai	6	6
(United Kingdom) S Murray (United Kingdom) J Windley	3	2
2	(Israel) J Glushko (Japan) E Sema	6	6

Semifinals
1	(France) J Coin (France) S Foretz Gacon	4	6	[10]
4	(Thailand) N Lertcheewakarn (China) Y Xu	6	1	[5]
3	(Japan) M Miyamura (Thailand) V Wongteanchai	1	6	[9]
2	(Israel) J Glushko (Japan) E Sema	6	4	[11]

Final
1	(France) J Coin (France) S Foretz Gacon	6	6
2	(Israel) J Glushko (Japan) E Sema	2	4
