= 1996 Nottingham Open – Doubles =

Doubles
- 1996 Nottingham Open

Final
- Champions: (United Kingdom) Mark Petchey (United Kingdom) Danny Sapsford
- Runners-up: (United Kingdom) Neil Broad (South Africa) Piet Norval
- Score: 6–7, 7–6, 6–4

Details
- Draw: 16
- Seeds: 4

Events
| Singles | Doubles |
| ← 1995 · | Nottingham Open | · 1997 → |

Luke Jensen and Murphy Jensen were the defending champions but lost in the quarterfinals to Ellis Ferreira and Jan Siemerink.

Mark Petchey and Danny Sapsford won in the final 6–7, 7–6, 6–4 against Neil Broad and Piet Norval.

== Seeds ==
1. (United States) Patrick Galbraith / (Russia) Andrei Olhovskiy (quarterfinals)
2. (South Africa) Ellis Ferreira / (Netherlands) Jan Siemerink (semifinals)
3. (Argentina) Javier Frana / (United States) Rick Leach (first round)
4. (United States) Kent Kinnear / (United States) Dave Randall (quarterfinals)

== Draw ==
=== Key ===
- Q = Qualifier
- WC = Wild card
- LL = Lucky loser
- Alt = Alternate
- SE = Special exempt
- PR = Protected ranking
- ITF = ITF entry
- JE = Junior exempt
- w/o = Walkover
- r = Retired
- d = Defaulted
- SR = Special ranking

First round
1 | (United States) P Galbraith (Russia) A Olhovskiy | 6 | 7
(Czech Republic) M Damm (South Africa) M Ondruska | 4 | 6
(United States) K Flach (Australia) A Kratzmann | 6 | 1
WC | (United Kingdom) M Petchey (United Kingdom) D Sapsford | 7 | 6
4 | (United States) K Kinnear (United States) D Randall | 6 | 7
(South Africa) M Barnard (United States) G Van Emburgh | 4 | 5
WC | (United Kingdom) A Foster (United Kingdom) C Wilkinson | 6 | 4
(United States) S Cannon (United States) M Keil | 7 | 6
(United States) S Davis (United States) M Lucena | 7 | 6
(United States) K Jones (Venezuela) N Pereira | 6 | 2
(United Kingdom) N Broad (South Africa) P Norval | 2 | 6 | 6
3 | (Argentina) J Frana (United States) R Leach | 6 | 4 | 2
Q | (Sweden) R Bergh (South Africa) G Muller | 4 | 6
WC | (United States) L Jensen (United States) M Jensen | 6 | 7
(South Africa) L Bale (Netherlands) S Noteboom | 1 | 3
2 | (South Africa) E Ferreira (Netherlands) J Siemerink | 6 | 6

Quarterfinals
1 | (United States) P Galbraith (Russia) A Olhovskiy | 7 | 4 | 3
WC | (United Kingdom) M Petchey (United Kingdom) D Sapsford | 6 | 6 | 6
4 | (United States) K Kinnear (United States) D Randall | 3 | 5
(United States) S Cannon (United States) M Keil | 6 | 7
(United States) S Davis (United States) M Lucena | 4 | 4
(United Kingdom) N Broad (South Africa) P Norval | 6 | 6
WC | (United States) L Jensen (United States) M Jensen | 5 | 1
2 | (South Africa) E Ferreira (Netherlands) J Siemerink | 7 | 6

Semifinals
WC | (United Kingdom) M Petchey (United Kingdom) D Sapsford | 6 | 6
(United States) S Cannon (United States) M Keil | 3 | 2
(United Kingdom) N Broad (South Africa) P Norval | 7 | 6
2 | (South Africa) E Ferreira (Netherlands) J Siemerink | 6 | 4

Final
WC | (United Kingdom) M Petchey (United Kingdom) D Sapsford | 6 | 7 | 6
(United Kingdom) N Broad (South Africa) P Norval | 7 | 6 | 4
