= 2013 Nottingham Challenge – Women's singles =

Women's singles
- 2013 Nottingham Challenge

Final
- Champion: (United Kingdom) Elena Baltacha
- Runner-up: (Slovenia) Tadeja Majerič
- Score: 7–5, 7–6^{(9–7)}

Events
Singles	men	women
Doubles	men	women
← 2012 ·	Nottingham Challenge	· 2014 →

Ashleigh Barty was the defending champion, but decided to participate in the 2013 Birmingham Classic that week.

Britain's Elena Baltacha defeated Tadeja Majerič of Slovenia 7–5, 7–6^{(9–7)} in the final, to claim the 2013 title.

== Seeds ==
1. (Japan) Misaki Doi (first round)
2. (Croatia) Petra Martić (quarterfinals)
3. (France) Stéphanie Foretz Gacon (first round)
4. (Italy) Nastassja Burnett (semifinals)
5. (Czech Republic) Barbora Záhlavová-Strýcová (quarterfinals)
6. (France) Claire Feuerstein (first round)
7. (Slovenia) Tadeja Majerič (final)
8. (Israel) Julia Glushko (second round)

== Main draw ==
=== Key ===
- Q = Qualifier
- WC = Wild card
- LL = Lucky loser
- Alt = Alternate
- ITF = ITF entry
- PR = Protected ranking
- SR = Special ranking
- SE = Special exempt
- JE = Junior exempt
- JR = Junior Accelerator Programme entrant
- CO = College Accelerator Programme entrant
- NG = Next Gen Accelerator Program entrant
- w/o = Walkover
- r = Retired
- d = Defaulted

=== Finals ===
Semifinals
(United Kingdom) Elena Baltacha	6	6
4	(Italy) Nastassja Burnett	0	4
Q	(Japan) Miki Miyamura	0	4
7	(Slovenia) Tadeja Majerič	6	6

Final
(United Kingdom) Elena Baltacha	7	7^{9}
7	(Slovenia) Tadeja Majerič	5	6^{7}

=== Top half ===
First round
1	(Japan) M Doi	4	4
(United Kingdom) E Baltacha	6	6
Q	(United Kingdom) E Webley-Smith	6	2	6
Q	(Thailand) N Lertcheewakarn	2	6	3
WC	(United Kingdom) S Murray	6	7^{7}
(Liechtenstein) S Vogt	0	6^{2}
(Japan) E Sema	4	2
5	(Czech Republic) B Záhlavová-Strýcová	6	6
4	(Italy) N Burnett	6	6
(Japan) S Ishizu	1	3
(Belgium) A-S Mestach	6	4	6
(Thailand) V Wongteanchai	4	6	1
WC	(United Kingdom) J Windley	0	6^{5}
(Croatia) A Vrljić	6	7^{7}
(United States) M Brengle	6	6
6	(France) C Feuerstein	1	2

Second round
(United Kingdom) E Baltacha	6	6
Q	(United Kingdom) E Webley-Smith	1	3
WC	(United Kingdom) S Murray	6^{6}	5
5	(Czech Republic) B Záhlavová-Strýcová	7^{8}	7
4	(Italy) N Burnett	7^{7}	6
(Belgium) A-S Mestach	6^{2}	2
(Croatia) A Vrljić	4	2
(United States) M Brengle	6	6

Quarterfinals
(United Kingdom) E Baltacha	6	6
5	(Czech Republic) B Záhlavová-Strýcová	4	4
4	(Italy) N Burnett	6	2	6
(United States) M Brengle	4	6	4

Semifinals
(United Kingdom) E Baltacha	6	6
4	(Italy) N Burnett	0	4

=== Bottom half ===
First round
8	(Israel) J Glushko	6	1	6
(South Africa) C Simmonds	3	6	2
Q	(Japan) M Miyamura	5	6	6
(France) J Coin	7	1	3
(Thailand) N Luangnam	4	3
WC	(United Kingdom) L Whybourn	6	6
(Canada) S Dubois	6	6
3	(France) S Foretz Gacon	0	3
7	(Slovenia) T Majerič	6	5	6
Q	(Spain) S Sorribes Tormo	1	7	0
(France) I Pavlovic	2	5
(Romania) A Mitu	6	7
(Slovakia) AK Schmiedlová	4	5
(Japan) Y Sema	6	7
WC	(United Kingdom) N Broady	6^{3}	6	3
2	(Croatia) P Martić	7^{7}	4	6

Second round
8	(Israel) J Glushko	4	3
Q	(Japan) M Miyamura	6	6
WC	(United Kingdom) L Whybourn	2	1
(Canada) S Dubois	6	6
7	(Slovenia) T Majerič	6	6
(Romania) A Mitu	4	4
(Japan) Y Sema	3	0
2	(Croatia) P Martić	6	6

Quarterfinals
Q	(Japan) M Miyamura	6	6
(Canada) S Dubois	4	4
7	(Slovenia) T Majerič	1	6	7
2	(Croatia) P Martić	6	0	5

Semifinals
Q	(Japan) M Miyamura	0	4
7	(Slovenia) T Majerič	6	6
