= 2014 Nottingham Challenge – Men's singles =

Men's singles
- 2014 Nottingham Challenge

Final
- Champion: (Australia) Nick Kyrgios
- Runner-up: (Australia) Samuel Groth
- Score: 7–6^{(7–3)}, 7–6^{(9–7)}

Events
Singles	men	women
Doubles	men	women
← 2013 ·	Nottingham Challenge	· 2015 →

Steve Johnson was the defending champion, but chose to compete in the 2014 Gerry Weber Open instead.

Nick Kyrgios won the title, defeating Samuel Groth in the final, 7–6^{(7–3)}, 7–6^{(9–7)}.

== Seeds ==
1. (Japan) Go Soeda (first round)
2. (Luxembourg) Gilles Müller (quarterfinals)
3. (Germany) Andreas Beck (first round)
4. (Japan) Tatsuma Ito (quarterfinals)
5. (Australia) Samuel Groth (final)
6. (Japan) Yūichi Sugita (first round)
7. (Romania) Marius Copil (quarterfinals)
8. (United States) Rajeev Ram (semifinals)

== Draw ==
=== Key ===
- Q = Qualifier
- WC = Wild card
- LL = Lucky loser
- Alt = Alternate
- SE = Special exempt
- PR = Protected ranking
- ITF = ITF entry
- JE = Junior exempt
- w/o = Walkover
- r = Retired
- d = Defaulted
- SR = Special ranking

=== Finals ===
Semifinals
Q	(Australia) Nick Kyrgios	6	6
(Slovakia) Miloslav Mečíř Jr.	3	2
8	(United States) Rajeev Ram	6^{5}	6^{4}
5	(Australia) Samuel Groth	7^{7}	7^{7}

Final
Q	(Australia) Nick Kyrgios	7^{7}	7^{9}
5	(Australia) Samuel Groth	6^{3}	6^{7}

=== Top half ===
First round
1	(Japan) G Soeda	2	2
WC	(United Kingdom) K Edmund	6	6
(Belgium) R Bemelmans	6	4	4
Q	(Australia) N Kyrgios	4	6	6
(Slovenia) G Žemlja	6^{5}	0
Q	(Austria) M Fischer	7^{7}	6
(Serbia) F Krajinović	7^{7}	7^{9}
6	(Japan) Y Sugita	6^{5}	6^{7}
3	(Germany) A Beck	7^{10}	1	1
(Slovakia) M Mečíř Jr.	6^{8}	6	6
(United Kingdom) D Smethurst	6	6^{7}	3
(Croatia) A Pavić	3	7^{9}	6
WC	(United Kingdom) E Corrie	1	6	4
WC	(United Kingdom) M Willis	6	3	6
PR	(Ukraine) S Bubka	3	6^{3}
7	(Romania) M Copil	6	7^{7}

Second round
WC	(United Kingdom) K Edmund	3	3
Q	(Australia) N Kyrgios	6	6
Q	(Austria) M Fischer	6^{2}	6	3
(Serbia) F Krajinović	7^{7}	0	6
(Slovakia) M Mečíř Jr.	3	7	7^{7}
(Croatia) A Pavić	6	5	6^{4}
WC	(United Kingdom) M Willis	6^{3}	4
7	(Romania) M Copil	7^{7}	6

Quarterfinals
Q	(Australia) N Kyrgios	4	6	7^{7}
(Serbia) F Krajinović	6	4	6^{4}
(Slovakia) M Mečíř Jr.	7	3	6
7	(Romania) M Copil	5	6	3

Semifinals
Q	(Australia) N Kyrgios	6	6
(Slovakia) M Mečíř Jr.	3	2

=== Bottom half ===
First round
8	(United States) R Ram	6	6
(United States) D Kosakowski	2	3
WC	(United Kingdom) O Golding	3	4
(United States) R Williams	6	6
(Japan) H Moriya	3	6	7^{7}
Q	(Australia) J-P Smith	6	3	6^{2}
(United States) A Krajicek	2	2
4	(Japan) T Ito	6	6
5	(Australia) S Groth	7^{7}	7^{8}
(Serbia) I Bozoljac	6^{2}	6^{6}
(Japan) Y Uchiyama	6^{5}	2
Q	(New Zealand) M Venus	7^{7}	6
(United Kingdom) D Rice	6	6^{4}	7
SE	(Bulgaria) D Kutrovsky	4	7^{7}	5
(Lithuania) L Grigelis	6^{3}	4
2	(Luxembourg) G Müller	7^{7}	6

Second round
8	(United States) R Ram	6	6
(United States) R Williams	3	0
(Japan) H Moriya	1	4
4	(Japan) T Ito	6	6
5	(Australia) S Groth	7^{15}	6
Q	(New Zealand) M Venus	6^{13}	4
(United Kingdom) D Rice	3	4
2	(Luxembourg) G Müller	6	6

Quarterfinals
8	(United States) R Ram	4	7^{10}	6
4	(Japan) T Ito	6	6^{8}	4
5	(Australia) S Groth	6	7
2	(Luxembourg) G Müller	4	5

Semifinals
8	(United States) R Ram	6^{5}	6^{4}
5	(Australia) S Groth	7^{7}	7^{7}
