= 2013 Nottingham Challenge – Men's doubles =

Men's doubles
- 2013 Nottingham Challenge

Final
- Champion: (Thailand) Sanchai Ratiwatana (Thailand) Sonchat Ratiwatana
- Runner-up: (India) Purav Raja (India) Divij Sharan
- Score: 7–6^{(7–5)}, 6–7^{(3–7)}, [10–8]

Events
Singles	men	women
Doubles	men	women
← 2012 ·	Nottingham Challenge	· 2014 →

Olivier Charroin and Martin Fischer were the defending champions, but decided not to participate.
Sanchai Ratiwatana and Sonchat Ratiwatana won the final 7–6^{(7–5)}, 6–7^{(3–7)}, [10–8] against Purav Raja and Divij Sharan

== Seeds ==
1. (Brazil) Marcelo Demoliner / (United States) Nicholas Monroe (semifinals)
2. (Thailand) Sanchai Ratiwatana / (Thailand) Sonchat Ratiwatana (champion)
3. (United Kingdom) Jamie Delgado / (Australia) Matthew Ebden (semifinals)
4. (India) Purav Raja / (India) Divij Sharan (final)

== Draw ==
=== Key ===
- Q = Qualifier
- WC = Wild card
- LL = Lucky loser
- Alt = Alternate
- SE = Special exempt
- PR = Protected ranking
- ITF = ITF entry
- JE = Junior exempt
- w/o = Walkover
- r = Retired
- d = Defaulted
- SR = Special ranking

=== Draw ===
First round
1	(Brazil) M Demoliner (United States) N Monroe	6	7^{8}
WC	(Italy) F Cipolla (Canada) F Peliwo	1	6^{6}
WC	(United Kingdom) K Skupski (United Kingdom) N Skupski	6	6
(Canada) V Pospisil (United States) B Reynolds	1	4
4	(India) P Raja (India) D Sharan	6	3	[10]
(South Africa) R de Voest (Canada) A Shamasdin	1	6	[7]
(South Africa) R Roelofse (Japan) G Soeda	7^{7}	3	[10]
(Argentina) M Alund (Belarus) U Ignatik	6^{3}	6	[4]
WC	(United Kingdom) D Rice (United Kingdom) S Thornley	3	7^{7}	[4]
(Australia) C Guccione (Australia) J Kerr	6	6^{2}	[10]
(United States) S Johnson (United States) J Sock	2	6	[6]
3	(United Kingdom) J Delgado (Australia) M Ebden	6	3	[10]
(Slovakia) K Beck (Ukraine) I Marchenko	6	6^{5}	[7]
(Poland) M Przysiężny (France) F Serra	4	7^{7}	[10]
(Germany) M Bachinger (Germany) D Brown	4	7^{7}	[7]
2	(Thailand) Sa Ratiwatana (Thailand) So Ratiwatana	6	6^{3}	[10]

Quarterfinals
1	(Brazil) M Demoliner (United States) N Monroe	7^{7}	7^{7}
WC	(United Kingdom) K Skupski (United Kingdom) N Skupski	6^{4}	6^{5}
4	(India) P Raja (India) D Sharan	7^{7}	7
(South Africa) R Roelofse (Japan) G Soeda	6^{5}	5
(Australia) C Guccione (Australia) J Kerr	6	4	[6]
3	(United Kingdom) J Delgado (Australia) M Ebden	3	6	[10]
(Poland) M Przysiężny (France) F Serra	3	3
2	(Thailand) Sa Ratiwatana (Thailand) So Ratiwatana	6	6

Semifinals
1	(Brazil) M Demoliner (United States) N Monroe	7^{10}	3	[8]
4	(India) P Raja (India) D Sharan	6^{8}	6	[10]
3	(United Kingdom) J Delgado (Australia) M Ebden	5	4
2	(Thailand) Sa Ratiwatana (Thailand) So Ratiwatana	7	7

Final
4	(India) P Raja (India) D Sharan	6^{5}	7^{7}	[8]
2	(Thailand) Sa Ratiwatana (Thailand) So Ratiwatana	7^{7}	6^{3}	[10]
