= 2015 Nottingham Open – Men's singles =

Men's singles
- 2015 Nottingham Open

Final
- Champion: (Uzbekistan) Denis Istomin
- Runner-up: (United States) Sam Querrey
- Score: 7–6^{(7–1)}, 7–6^{(8–6)}

Details
- Draw: 48
- Seeds: 16

Events
Singles	men	women
Doubles	men	women
- Nottingham Open

Ivo Karlović was the defending champion from when the Nottingham Open was last held in 2008, but chose not to participate.

Denis Istomin won the 2015 men's singles title, defeating Sam Querrey in the final, 7–6^{(7–1)}, 7–6^{(8–6)}. It was his first ATP Tour singles title.

== Seeds ==
All seeds receive a bye into the second round.

1. (Spain) David Ferrer (second round)
2. (France) Gilles Simon (quarterfinals)
3. (Spain) Feliciano López (third round)
4. (Argentina) Leonardo Mayer (quarterfinals)
5. (Uruguay) Pablo Cuevas (third round)
6. (Serbia) Viktor Troicki (second round)
7. (Austria) Dominic Thiem (third round)
8. (France) Adrian Mannarino (third round)
9. (Argentina) Juan Mónaco (second round)
10. (Slovakia) Martin Kližan (second round)
11. (Spain) Pablo Andújar (second round)
12. (United States) Sam Querrey (final)
13. (Brazil) Thomaz Bellucci (second round)
14. (Portugal) João Sousa (third round)
15. (Italy) Andreas Seppi (second round)
16. (Czech Republic) Jiří Veselý (third round)

== Draw ==
Key

- Q = Qualifier
- WC = Wild card
- LL = Lucky loser
- Alt = Alternate
- ITF = ITF entry
- PR = Protected ranking
- SR = Special ranking
- SE = Special exempt
- JE = Junior exempt
- JR = Junior Accelerator Programme entrant
- CO = College Accelerator Programme entrant
- NG = Next Gen Accelerator Program entrant
- w/o = Walkover
- r = Retired
- d = Defaulted

=== Finals ===
Quarterfinals
(Cyprus) Marcos Baghdatis	6	6
(Italy) Simone Bolelli	4	4
4	(Argentina) Leonardo Mayer	3	7^{10}	6^{6}
(Uzbekistan) Denis Istomin	6	6^{8}	7^{8}
(Ukraine) Alexandr Dolgopolov	6	4	7^{7}
(Chinese Taipei) Lu Yen-hsun	4	6	6^{4}
12	(United States) Sam Querrey	5	7^{10}	6
2	(France) Gilles Simon	7	6^{8}	4

Semifinals
(Cyprus) Marcos Baghdatis	2^{r}
(Uzbekistan) Denis Istomin	1
(Ukraine) Alexandr Dolgopolov	6	3	5
12	(United States) Sam Querrey	4	6	7

Final
(Uzbekistan) Denis Istomin	7^{7}	7^{8}
12	(United States) Sam Querrey	6^{1}	6^{6}

=== Top half ===
==== Section 1 ====
First round
(Dominican Republic) V Estrella Burgos	5	0^{r}
(Cyprus) M Baghdatis	7	3
WC	(Germany) A Zverev	6	6
(Kazakhstan) M Kukushkin	0	2
(Italy) S Bolelli	6	6
Q	(Japan) G Soeda	3	2
(Argentina) D Schwartzman	1	7^{7}	2
(United Kingdom) A Bedene	6	6^{5}	6

Second round
1	(Spain) D Ferrer	2	6^{4}
(Cyprus) M Baghdatis	6	7^{7}
WC	(Germany) A Zverev	6^{7}	6	6
13	(Brazil) T Bellucci	7^{9}	3	4
10	(Slovakia) M Kližan	3	7^{7}	1
(Italy) S Bolelli	6	6^{4}	6
(United Kingdom) A Bedene	6^{4}	4
8	(France) A Mannarino	7^{7}	6

Third round
(Cyprus) M Baghdatis	6	6
WC	(Germany) A Zverev	3	3
(Italy) S Bolelli	3	6	6
8	(France) A Mannarino	6	4	4

Quarterfinals
(Cyprus) M Baghdatis	6	6
(Italy) S Bolelli	4	4

==== Section 2 ====
First round
(South Korea) H Chung	6	7^{8}
(Spain) A Ramos Viñolas	4	6^{6}
WC	(United Kingdom) J Ward	6	6^{3}	1
(United States) T Smyczek	1	7^{7}	6
PR	(Spain) N Almagro	1	4
(Uzbekistan) D Istomin	6	6
(Ukraine) S Stakhovsky	6	6
(United States) S Johnson	4	3

Second round
4	(Argentina) L Mayer	6	6
(South Korea) H Chung	3	1
(United States) T Smyczek	1	3
16	(Czech Republic) J Veselý	6	6
9	(Argentina) J Mónaco	1	2
(Uzbekistan) D Istomin	6	6
(Ukraine) S Stakhovsky	6	6
6	(Serbia) V Troicki	4	2

Third round
4	(Argentina) L Mayer	7^{7}	7^{7}
16	(Czech Republic) J Veselý	6^{2}	6^{5}
(Uzbekistan) D Istomin	7	6
(Ukraine) S Stakhovsky	5	4

Quarterfinals
4	(Argentina) L Mayer	3	7^{10}	6^{6}
(Uzbekistan) D Istomin	6	6^{8}	7^{8}

=== Bottom half ===
==== Section 3 ====
First round
(Tunisia) M Jaziri	7^{7}	7^{7}
WC	(United Kingdom) K Edmund	6^{4}	6^{5}
(Ukraine) A Dolgopolov	6	6
(United States) D Young	4	4
(Chinese Taipei) Y-h Lu	6	6
Q	(Belgium) R Bemelmans	4	4
(Spain) P Carreño Busta	1	4
WC	(United States) TH Fritz	6	6

Second round
7	(Austria) D Thiem	6	6
(Tunisia) M Jaziri	3	1
(Ukraine) A Dolgopolov	7^{7}	6^{5}	6
11	(Spain) P Andújar	6^{5}	7^{7}	4
15	(Italy) A Seppi	4	3
(Chinese Taipei) Y-h Lu	6	6
WC	(United States) TH Fritz	3	3
3	(Spain) F López	6	6

Third round
7	(Austria) D Thiem	3	3
(Ukraine) A Dolgopolov	6	6
(Chinese Taipei) Y-h Lu	6	6
3	(Spain) F López	3	2

Quarterfinals
(Ukraine) A Dolgopolov	6	4	7^{7}
(Chinese Taipei) Y-h Lu	4	6	6^{4}

==== Section 4 ====
First round
Q	(Israel) D Sela	7	6
(Spain) D Gimeno Traver	5	4
(Colombia) S Giraldo	6	1	6
(Austria) A Haider-Maurer	1	6	1
(Australia) S Groth	7^{7}	7^{7}
Q	(Germany) M Zverev	6^{1}	6^{3}
(Spain) M Granollers	4	6	0
(Canada) V Pospisil	6	4	0^{r}

Second round
5	(Uruguay) P Cuevas	7	6
Q	(Israel) D Sela	5	4
(Colombia) S Giraldo	6^{4}	4
12	(United States) S Querrey	7^{7}	6
14	(Portugal) J Sousa	6^{5}	6	7^{7}
(Australia) S Groth	7^{7}	3	6^{3}
(Spain) M Granollers	6	6^{3}	6^{0}
2	(France) G Simon	4	7^{7}	7^{7}

Third round
5	(Uruguay) P Cuevas	6^{7}	6^{3}
12	(United States) S Querrey	7^{9}	7^{7}
14	(Portugal) J Sousa	4	1
2	(France) G Simon	6	6

Quarterfinals
12	(United States) S Querrey	5	7^{10}	6
2	(France) G Simon	7	6^{8}	4

== Qualifying ==
=== Seeds ===
1. (Turkey) Marsel İlhan (first round)
2. (Tunisia) Malek Jaziri (moved to main draw)
3. (Serbia) Dušan Lajović (first round)
4. (Israel) Dudi Sela (qualified)
5. (Japan) Go Soeda (qualified)
6. (Slovakia) Lukáš Lacko (qualifying competition)
7. (Slovenia) Blaž Rola (qualifying competition)
8. (Belgium) Ruben Bemelmans (qualified)

=== Qualifiers ===
1. (Japan) Go Soeda
2. (Belgium) Ruben Bemelmans
3. (Germany) Mischa Zverev
4. (Israel) Dudi Sela

=== Qualifying draw ===
==== First qualifier ====
First round
1	(Turkey) Marsel İlhan	1	4
(Australia) Jordan Thompson	6	6
(Serbia) Filip Krajinović	4	6	7^{7}
(Italy) Erik Crepaldi	6	4	6^{4}
(Croatia) Mate Pavić	6	6
WC	(United Kingdom) James Marsalek	4	4
(Belarus) Dzmitry Zhyrmont	4	3
5	(Japan) Go Soeda	6	6

Second round
(Australia) Jordan Thompson	6^{1}	6^{4}
(Serbia) Filip Krajinović	7^{7}	7^{7}
(Croatia) Mate Pavić	6^{4}	1
5	(Japan) Go Soeda	7^{7}	6

Qualifying competition
(Serbia) Filip Krajinović	1	1
5	(Japan) Go Soeda	6	6

==== Second qualifier ====
First round
Alt	(Thailand) Danai Udomchoke	7^{7}	1
(Poland) Łukasz Kubot	6^{3}	0^{r}
WC	(United Kingdom) Daniel Smethurst	7	6
(United States) Daniel Nguyen	5	1
(Australia) Alex Bolt	6^{4}	4
WC	(United Kingdom) Luke Bambridge	7^{7}	6
(United Kingdom) Brydan Klein	3	3
8	(Belgium) Ruben Bemelmans	6	6

Second round
Alt	(Thailand) Danai Udomchoke	3	2
WC	(United Kingdom) Daniel Smethurst	6	6
WC	(United Kingdom) Luke Bambridge	6^{5}	0
8	(Belgium) Ruben Bemelmans	7^{7}	6

Qualifying competition
WC	(United Kingdom) Daniel Smethurst	3	7	5
8	(Belgium) Ruben Bemelmans	6	5	7

==== Third qualifier ====
First round
3	(Serbia) Dušan Lajović	2	6^{2}
(Germany) Mischa Zverev	6	7^{7}
(Slovenia) Grega Žemlja	4	6	7^{7}
(Australia) Marinko Matosevic	6	1	6^{3}
(Bulgaria) Dimitar Kutrovsky	6	6
(United States) Connor Smith	4	3
(United Kingdom) Liam Broady	6^{5}	5
7	(Slovenia) Blaž Rola	7^{7}	7

Second round
(Germany) Mischa Zverev	6	6
(Slovenia) Grega Žemlja	4	2
(Bulgaria) Dimitar Kutrovsky	4	6^{3}
7	(Slovenia) Blaž Rola	6	7^{7}

Qualifying competition
(Germany) Mischa Zverev	7	6
7	(Slovenia) Blaž Rola	5	0

==== Fourth qualifier ====
First round
4	(Israel) Dudi Sela	7	6
(Switzerland) Adrien Bossel	5	4
(France) Lucas Pouille	3	4
(Germany) Daniel Brands	6	6
(Ukraine) Illya Marchenko	6	6
WC	(United Kingdom) David Rice	4	2
(Denmark) Frederik Nielsen	4	3
6	(Slovakia) Lukáš Lacko	6	6

Second round
4	(Israel) Dudi Sela	6	6
(Germany) Daniel Brands	2	4
(Ukraine) Illya Marchenko	6	4	4
6	(Slovakia) Lukáš Lacko	3	6	6

Qualifying competition
4	(Israel) Dudi Sela	6	7^{7}
6	(Slovakia) Lukáš Lacko	3	6^{1}
