= 2015 Nottingham Open – Women's singles =

Women's singles
- 2015 Nottingham Open

Final
- Champion: (Croatia) Ana Konjuh
- Runner-up: (Romania) Monica Niculescu
- Score: 1–6, 6–4, 6–2

Details
- Draw: 32
- Seeds: 8

Events
| Singles | men | women |
| Doubles | men | women |
- Nottingham Open

This was the first edition of the event as a WTA International tournament.

Ana Konjuh won the title, defeating Monica Niculescu in the final, 1–6, 6–4, 6–2.

== Seeds ==
1. (Poland) Agnieszka Radwańska (semifinals)
2. (Kazakhstan) Zarina Diyas (second round)
3. (United States) Varvara Lepchenko (first round)
4. (Italy) Karin Knapp (first round)
5. (United States) Alison Riske (semifinals)
6. (Australia) Casey Dellacqua (second round)
7. (Slovakia) Magdaléna Rybáriková (first round)
8. (Croatia) Ajla Tomljanović (first round)

== Draw ==
Key

- Q = Qualifier
- WC = Wild card
- LL = Lucky loser
- Alt = Alternate
- ITF = ITF entry
- PR = Protected ranking
- SR = Special ranking
- SE = Special exempt
- JE = Junior exempt
- JR = Junior Accelerator Programme entrant
- CO = College Accelerator Programme entrant
- NG = Next Gen Accelerator Program entrant
- w/o = Walkover
- r = Retired
- d = Defaulted

=== Finals ===
Semifinals
1/WC | (Poland) Agnieszka Radwańska | 7 | 4 | 0
(Romania) Monica Niculescu | 5 | 6 | 6
5 | (United States) Alison Riske | 4 | 3
(Croatia) Ana Konjuh | 6 | 6

Final
(Romania) Monica Niculescu | 6 | 4 | 2
(Croatia) Ana Konjuh | 1 | 6 | 6

=== Top half ===
First round
1/WC | (Poland) A Radwańska | 6 | 6
Q | (Russia) A Kudryavtseva | 0 | 3
Q | (Australia) J Gajdošová | 4 | 3
(United States) C McHale | 6 | 6
(Poland) M Linette | 6 | 4 | 7^{7}
(Slovakia) D Hantuchová | 2 | 6 | 6^{4}
(United States) L Davis | 4 | 7^{7} | 7
8 | (Croatia) A Tomljanović | 6 | 6^{1} | 5
3 | (United States) V Lepchenko | 6 | 3 | 1
(Romania) M Niculescu | 4 | 6 | 6
Q | (Belarus) O Govortsova | 6 | 6
WC | (United Kingdom) K Dunne | 1 | 2
(Czech Republic) L Hradecká | 6^{5} | 6^{5}
(Puerto Rico) M Puig | 7^{7} | 7^{7}
WC | (United Kingdom) J Konta | 6 | 6
7 | (Slovakia) M Rybáriková | 3 | 3

Second round
1/WC | (Poland) A Radwańska | 6 | 6
(United States) C McHale | 3 | 1
(Poland) M Linette | 7 | 6^{13} | 2
(United States) L Davis | 5 | 7^{15} | 6
(Romania) M Niculescu | 2 | 7 | 7
Q | (Belarus) O Govortsova | 6 | 5 | 5
(Puerto Rico) M Puig | 6 | 4 | 6^{5}
WC | (United Kingdom) J Konta | 4 | 6 | 7^{7}

Quarterfinals
1/WC | (Poland) A Radwańska | 6 | 6
(United States) L Davis | 2 | 2
(Romania) M Niculescu | 6 | 2 | 6
WC | (United Kingdom) J Konta | 2 | 6 | 2

Semifinals
1/WC | (Poland) A Radwańska | 7 | 4 | 0
(Romania) M Niculescu | 5 | 6 | 6

=== Bottom half ===
First round
5 | (United States) A Riske | 6 | 6
(China) S Zheng | 3 | 4
(Croatia) M Lučić-Baroni | 6 | 4 | 6
(Switzerland) S Vögele | 0 | 6 | 3
(Serbia) B Jovanovski | 6 | 3 | 6
(United States) N Gibbs | 1 | 6 | 4
(Belgium) Y Wickmayer | 6 | 6
4 | (Italy) K Knapp | 4 | 2
6 | (Australia) C Dellacqua | 7 | 6
(Bulgaria) S Karatantcheva | 5 | 3
(United States) S Rogers | 0 | 3
(Croatia) A Konjuh | 6 | 6
Q | (United States) S Vickery | 7^{7} | 7
(China) Q Wang | 6^{2} | 5
(Italy) F Schiavone | 6^{5} | 6^{6}
2 | (Kazakhstan) Z Diyas | 7^{7} | 7^{8}

Second round
5 | (United States) A Riske | 6 | 6
(Croatia) M Lučić-Baroni | 3 | 4
(Serbia) B Jovanovski | 0 | 4
(Belgium) Y Wickmayer | 6 | 6
6 | (Australia) C Dellacqua | 4 | 2
(Croatia) A Konjuh | 6 | 6
Q | (United States) S Vickery | 4 | 7^{7} | 6
2 | (Kazakhstan) Z Diyas | 6 | 6^{5} | 1

Quarterfinals
5 | (United States) A Riske | 6 | 2
(Belgium) Y Wickmayer | 2 | 0^{r}
(Croatia) A Konjuh | 6 | 6
Q | (United States) S Vickery | 2 | 2

Semifinals
5 | (United States) A Riske | 4 | 3
(Croatia) A Konjuh | 6 | 6

== Qualifying ==
=== Seeds ===
1. (Australia) Jarmila Gajdošová (qualified)
2. (China) Zhu Lin (second round)
3. (Slovakia) Jana Čepelová (first round)
4. (Czech Republic) Kristýna Plíšková (first round)
5. (Belarus) Olga Govortsova (qualified)
6. (Portugal) Michelle Larcher de Brito (qualifying competition)
7. (Russia) Alla Kudryavtseva (qualified)
8. (United States) Sachia Vickery (qualified)

=== Qualifiers ===
1. (Australia) Jarmila Gajdošová
2. (United States) Sachia Vickery
3. (Belarus) Olga Govortsova
4. (Russia) Alla Kudryavtseva

=== Qualifying draw ===
==== First qualifier ====
First round
1 | (Australia) Jarmila Gajdošová | 6 | 6
(Japan) Misa Eguchi | 1 | 4
(Croatia) Petra Martić | 1 | 6 | 3
(Brazil) Beatriz Haddad Maia | 6 | 2 | 6
(Ukraine) Kateryna Bondarenko | 1 | 2
(Ukraine) Olga Savchuk | 6 | 6
(United States) Abigail Spears | 4 | 1
6 | (Portugal) Michelle Larcher de Brito | 6 | 6

Second round
1 | (Australia) Jarmila Gajdošová | 6 | 6
(Brazil) Beatriz Haddad Maia | 3 | 3
(Ukraine) Olga Savchuk | 4 | 6^{3}
6 | (Portugal) Michelle Larcher de Brito | 6 | 7^{7}

Qualifying competition
1 | (Australia) Jarmila Gajdošová | 6 | 6
6 | (Portugal) Michelle Larcher de Brito | 0 | 4

==== Second qualifier ====
First round
2 | (China) Zhu Lin | 6 | 6
(Slovakia) Rebecca Šramková | 4 | 1
(Chinese Taipei) Chan Yung-jan | 5 | 3
(Spain) Arantxa Parra Santonja | 7 | 6
(China) Liang Chen | 6 | 7
WC | (United Kingdom) Sarah Beth Askew | 0 | 5
(United States) Raquel Kops-Jones | 0 | 3
8 | (United States) Sachia Vickery | 6 | 6

Second round
2 | (China) Zhu Lin | 1 | 6 | 6^{6}
(Spain) Arantxa Parra Santonja | 6 | 3 | 7^{8}
(China) Liang Chen | 3 | 2
8 | (United States) Sachia Vickery | 6 | 6

Qualifying competition
(Spain) Arantxa Parra Santonja | 6^{4} | 2
8 | (United States) Sachia Vickery | 7^{7} | 6

==== Third qualifier ====
First round
3 | (Slovakia) Jana Čepelová | 1 | 4
(Croatia) Donna Vekić | 6 | 6
(Ukraine) Yuliya Beygelzimer | 6 | 6
(China) Xu Yifan | 2 | 4
(China) Zhang Kailin | 6 | 6
(China) Yang Zhaoxuan | 1 | 1
(Turkey) Çağla Büyükakçay | 1 | 2
5 | (Belarus) Olga Govortsova | 6 | 6

Second round
(Croatia) Donna Vekić | 3 | 6^{7}
(Ukraine) Yuliya Beygelzimer | 6 | 7^{9}
(China) Zhang Kailin | 1 | 2
5 | (Belarus) Olga Govortsova | 6 | 6

Qualifying competition
(Ukraine) Yuliya Beygelzimer | 0 | 2
5 | (Belarus) Olga Govortsova | 6 | 6

==== Fourth qualifier ====
First round
4 | (Czech Republic) Kristýna Plíšková | 4 | 4
(China) Wang Yafan | 6 | 6
(Poland) Paula Kania | 6 | 6
(Canada) Gabriela Dabrowski | 4 | 4
(Japan) Shuko Aoyama | 1 | 4
(Japan) Kimiko Date-Krumm | 6 | 6
(United States) Anna Tatishvili | 0 | 2
7 | (Russia) Alla Kudryavtseva | 6 | 6

Second round
(China) Wang Yafan | 2 | 5
(Poland) Paula Kania | 6 | 7
(Japan) Kimiko Date-Krumm | 6 | 5 | 5
7 | (Russia) Alla Kudryavtseva | 4 | 7 | 7

Qualifying competition
(Poland) Paula Kania | 3 | 6^{6}
7 | (Russia) Alla Kudryavtseva | 6 | 7^{8}
