= 2015 Nottingham Open – Men's doubles =

Men's doubles
- 2015 Nottingham Open

Final
- Champion: (Australia) Chris Guccione (Brazil) André Sá
- Runner-up: (Uruguay) Pablo Cuevas (Spain) David Marrero
- Score: 6–2, 7–5

Details
- Draw: 16
- Seeds: 4

Events
Singles	men	women
Doubles	men	women
- Nottingham Open

This was the first edition of the tournament since 2008.

Chris Guccione and André Sá won the title, defeating Pablo Cuevas and David Marrero in the final, 6–2, 7–5.

== Seeds ==
1. (Spain) Marcel Granollers / (India) Leander Paes (quarterfinals)
2. (Uruguay) Pablo Cuevas / (Spain) David Marrero (final)
3. (Colombia) Juan Sebastián Cabal / (Colombia) Robert Farah (first round)
4. (United Kingdom) Dominic Inglot / (United Kingdom) Jamie Murray (first round)

== Draw ==
Key

- Q = Qualifier
- WC = Wild card
- LL = Lucky loser
- Alt = Alternate
- ITF = ITF entry
- PR = Protected ranking
- SR = Special ranking
- SE = Special exempt
- JE = Junior exempt
- JR = Junior Accelerator Programme entrant
- CO = College Accelerator Programme entrant
- NG = Next Gen Accelerator Program entrant
- w/o = Walkover
- r = Retired
- d = Defaulted

=== Draw ===
First round
1	(Spain) M Granollers (India) L Paes	3	6	[11]
(Philippines) T Huey (United States) S Lipsky	6	2	[9]
(Australia) C Guccione (Brazil) A Sá	6	7^{7}
(Argentina) J Mónaco (Argentina) D Schwartzman	4	6^{3}
3	(Colombia) JS Cabal (Colombia) R Farah	6^{6}	6	[8]
(Italy) S Bolelli (Pakistan) A-u-H Qureshi	7^{8}	2	[10]
(Poland) M Fyrstenberg (Mexico) S González	3	2
WC	(United States) E Butorac (United Kingdom) C Fleming	6	6
(Argentina) G Durán (Argentina) L Mayer	1	4
WC	(United Kingdom) K Skupski (United Kingdom) N Skupski	6	6
Alt	(Poland) Ł Kubot (Belarus) M Mirnyi	6	6
4	(United Kingdom) D Inglot (United Kingdom) J Murray	4	2
(Sweden) R Lindstedt (New Zealand) A Sitak	3	7^{7}	[10]
(South Africa) R Klaasen (United States) R Ram	6	6^{5}	[8]
(Spain) P Andújar (Austria) O Marach	3	4
2	(Uruguay) P Cuevas (Spain) D Marrero	6	6

Quarterfinals
1	(Spain) M Granollers (India) L Paes	4	6	[7]
(Australia) C Guccione (Brazil) A Sá	6	3	[10]
(Italy) S Bolelli (Pakistan) A-u-H Qureshi
WC	(United States) E Butorac (United Kingdom) C Fleming	w/o
WC	(United Kingdom) K Skupski (United Kingdom) N Skupski	6	6^{1}	[7]
Alt	(Poland) Ł Kubot (Belarus) M Mirnyi	4	7^{7}	[10]
(Sweden) R Lindstedt (New Zealand) A Sitak	1	6	[7]
2	(Uruguay) P Cuevas (Spain) D Marrero	6	1	[10]

Semifinals
(Australia) C Guccione (Brazil) A Sá	2	6	[11]
WC	(United States) E Butorac (United Kingdom) C Fleming	6	2	[9]
Alt	(Poland) Ł Kubot (Belarus) M Mirnyi	5	6	[10]
2	(Uruguay) P Cuevas (Spain) D Marrero	7	1	[12]

Final
(Australia) C Guccione (Brazil) A Sá	6	7
2	(Uruguay) P Cuevas (Spain) D Marrero	2	5
