= 2013 Nottingham Challenge – Men's singles =

Men's singles
- 2013 Nottingham Challenge

Final
- Champion: (United States) Steve Johnson
- Runner-up: (Belgium) Ruben Bemelmans
- Score: 7–5, 7–5

Events
Singles	men	women
Doubles	men	women
← 2012 ·	Nottingham Challenge	· 2014 →

Grega Žemlja was the defending champion, but chose to compete in the 2013 Birmingham Championship instead.
Steve Johnson won the final 7–5, 7–5 against Ruben Bemelmans.

== Seeds ==
1. (Russia) Alex Bogomolov Jr. (first round, retired)
2. (Argentina) Martín Alund (first round)
3. (Canada) Vasek Pospisil (second round)
4. (United States) Tim Smyczek (first round)
5. (United States) Jack Sock (second round)
6. (Ukraine) Illya Marchenko (quarterfinals)
7. (Australia) Matthew Ebden (second round)
8. (Japan) Go Soeda (quarterfinals)

== Draw ==
=== Key ===
- Q = Qualifier
- WC = Wild card
- LL = Lucky loser
- Alt = Alternate
- SE = Special exempt
- PR = Protected ranking
- ITF = ITF entry
- JE = Junior exempt
- w/o = Walkover
- r = Retired
- d = Defaulted
- SR = Special ranking

=== Finals ===
Semifinals
(Belgium) Ruben Bemelmans	5	7^{7}	7^{7}
(South Africa) Rik de Voest	7	6^{5}	6^{5}
(United States) Steve Johnson	6	6
(India) Somdev Devvarman	3	4

Final
(Belgium) Ruben Bemelmans	5	5
(United States) Steve Johnson	7	7

=== Top half ===
First round
1	(Russia) A Bogomolov Jr.	5	r
(Belarus) U Ignatik	7
(Slovakia) K Beck	6	4	3
LL	(Belarus) D Zhyrmont	4	6	6
(Belgium) R Bemelmans	7^{7}	6
WC	(United Kingdom) D Smethurst	6^{3}	1
(Belgium) M Authom	1	2
7	(Australia) M Ebden	6	6
4	(United States) T Smyczek	6^{4}	3
(South Africa) R de Voest	7^{7}	6
(Japan) Y Sugita	6	6
WC	(United Kingdom) J Milton	3	0
WC	(United Kingdom) D Rice	6	3	7^{13}
(United States) B Klahn	4	6	6^{11}
Q	(Switzerland) A Bossel	6	2	3
8	(Japan) G Soeda	1	6	6

Second round
(Belarus) U Ignatik	4	3
LL	(Belarus) D Zhyrmont	6	6
(Belgium) R Bemelmans	7^{7}	6
7	(Australia) M Ebden	6^{2}	3
(South Africa) R de Voest	6	6
(Japan) Y Sugita	3	2
WC	(United Kingdom) D Rice	6	1	2
8	(Japan) G Soeda	3	6	6

Quarterfinals
LL	(Belarus) D Zhyrmont	2	2
(Belgium) R Bemelmans	6	6
(South Africa) R de Voest	3	6	6
8	(Japan) G Soeda	6	1	3

Semifinals
(Belgium) R Bemelmans	5	7^{7}	7^{7}
(South Africa) R de Voest	7	6^{5}	6^{5}

=== Bottom half ===
First round
6	(Ukraine) I Marchenko	7^{7}	7^{7}
(France) F Serra	6^{4}	6^{4}
(Germany) M Berrer	6	6
Q	(United Kingdom) George Coupland	4	3
(United States) S Johnson	6	6
WC	(United Kingdom) Richard Gabb	2	3
(Germany) M Bachinger	6	6^{3}	4
3	(Canada) V Pospisil	3	7^{7}	6
5	(United States) J Sock	6	6
(Poland) M Przysiężny	4	2
Q	(United Kingdom) B Klein	6^{2}	4
(India) S Devvarman	7^{7}	6
Q	(United Kingdom) J Ward-Hibbert	1	6^{5}
(United States) D Young	6	7^{7}
(Italy) F Cipolla	6	6
2	(Argentina) M Alund	3	2

Second round
6	(Ukraine) I Marchenko	5
(Germany) M Berrer	4^{r}
(United States) S Johnson	6	7^{8}
3	(Canada) V Pospisil	4	6^{6}
5	(United States) J Sock	6	6^{5}	3
(India) S Devvarman	1	7^{7}	6
(United States) D Young	6	6
(Italy) F Cipolla	1	4

Quarterfinals
6	(Ukraine) I Marchenko	6^{4}	0
(United States) S Johnson	7^{7}	6
(India) S Devvarman	3	7^{7}	6
(United States) D Young	6	6^{4}	4

Semifinals
(United States) S Johnson	6	6
(India) S Devvarman	3	4
