= 2014 Nottingham Challenge – Women's doubles =

Women's doubles
- 2014 Nottingham Challenge

Final
- Champion: (Australia) Jarmila Gajdošová (Australia) Arina Rodionova
- Runner-up: (Paraguay) Verónica Cepede Royg (Liechtenstein) Stephanie Vogt
- Score: 7–6^{(7–0)}, 6–1

Events
Singles	men	women
Doubles	men	women
← 2013 ·	Nottingham Challenge	· 2015 →

Julie Coin and Stéphanie Foretz Gacon were the defending champions, but Coin chose not to participate. Foretz Gacon partnered with Amandine Hesse, but they lost in the semifinals.

The Australian third seeds Jarmila Gajdošová and Arina Rodionova won the tournament, defeating Verónica Cepede Royg and Stephanie Vogt in the final, 7–6^{(7–0)}, 6–1.

== Seeds ==
1. (Japan) Shuko Aoyama / (Czech Republic) Renata Voráčová (semifinals)
2. (Australia) Monique Adamczak / (Australia) Olivia Rogowska (quarterfinals)
3. (Australia) Jarmila Gajdošová / (Australia) Arina Rodionova (champions)
4. (Thailand) Noppawan Lertcheewakarn / (Thailand) Tamarine Tanasugarn (quarterfinals)

== Draw ==
=== Key ===
- Q = Qualifier
- WC = Wild card
- LL = Lucky loser
- Alt = Alternate
- SE = Special exempt
- PR = Protected ranking
- ITF = ITF entry
- JE = Junior exempt
- w/o = Walkover
- r = Retired
- d = Defaulted
- SR = Special ranking

First round
1	(Japan) S Aoyama (Czech Republic) R Voráčová	6	6
(United Kingdom) N Slater (United Kingdom) E Webley-Smith	3	3
(Serbia) A Krunić (Poland) M Linette	4	6	[4]
(United Kingdom) J Rae (United Kingdom) A Smith	6	2	[10]
4	(Thailand) N Lertcheewakarn (Thailand) T Tanasugarn	6	6
(Japan) E Hozumi (Japan) M Miyamura	0	3
WC	(United Kingdom) K Boulter (Japan) M Hibi	6	0	[6]
(Paraguay) V Cepede Royg (Liechtenstein) S Vogt	4	6	[10]
(United Kingdom) S Murray (United Kingdom) J Windley	1	5
(Japan) R Fujiwara (United States) M Sanchez	6	7
(Turkey) Ç Büyükakçay (Japan) E Sema	2	6	[7]
3	(Australia) J Gajdošová (Australia) Ar Rodionova	6	4	[10]
(Japan) M Eguchi (Poland) P Kania	2	6	[8]
(France) S Foretz Gacon (France) A Hesse	6	4	[10]
(Ukraine) K Kozlova (Ukraine) A Vasylyeva	2	2
2	(Australia) M Adamczak (Australia) O Rogowska	6	6

Quarterfinals
1	(Japan) S Aoyama (Czech Republic) R Voráčová	6	6
(United Kingdom) J Rae (United Kingdom) A Smith	2	3
4	(Thailand) N Lertcheewakarn (Thailand) T Tanasugarn	6	4	[5]
(Paraguay) V Cepede Royg (Liechtenstein) S Vogt	3	6	[10]
(Japan) R Fujiwara (United States) M Sanchez	6	3	[5]
3	(Australia) J Gajdošová (Australia) Ar Rodionova	4	6	[10]
(France) S Foretz Gacon (France) A Hesse	7^{7}	6
2	(Australia) M Adamczak (Australia) O Rogowska	6^{4}	2

Semifinals
1	(Japan) S Aoyama (Czech Republic) R Voráčová	2	6	[9]
(Paraguay) V Cepede Royg (Liechtenstein) S Vogt	6	0	[11]
3	(Australia) J Gajdošová (Australia) Ar Rodionova	3	7^{7}	[11]
(France) S Foretz Gacon (France) A Hesse	6	6^{3}	[9]

Final
(Paraguay) V Cepede Royg (Liechtenstein) S Vogt	6^{0}	1
3	(Australia) J Gajdošová (Australia) Ar Rodionova	7^{7}	6
