= 2015 Nottingham Open – Women's doubles =

Women's doubles
- 2015 Nottingham Open

Final
- Champion: (United States) Raquel Kops-Jones (United States) Abigail Spears
- Runner-up: (United Kingdom) Jocelyn Rae (United Kingdom) Anna Smith
- Score: 3–6, 6–3, [11–9]

Details
- Draw: 16
- Seeds: 4

Events
Singles	men	women
Doubles	men	women
- Nottingham Open

This was the first edition of the event as a WTA International tournament.

Raquel Kops-Jones and Abigail Spears won the title, defeating Jocelyn Rae and Anna Smith in the final, 3–6, 6–3, [11–9].

== Seeds ==
1. (United States) Raquel Kops-Jones / (United States) Abigail Spears (champions)
2. (Chinese Taipei) Chan Yung-jan / (China) Zheng Jie (semifinals)
3. (Chinese Taipei) Chan Hao-ching / (Russia) Alla Kudryavtseva (first round)
4. (Zimbabwe) Cara Black / (United States) Lisa Raymond (quarterfinals)

== Draw ==
Key

- Q = Qualifier
- WC = Wild card
- LL = Lucky loser
- Alt = Alternate
- ITF = ITF entry
- PR = Protected ranking
- SR = Special ranking
- SE = Special exempt
- JE = Junior exempt
- JR = Junior Accelerator Programme entrant
- CO = College Accelerator Programme entrant
- NG = Next Gen Accelerator Program entrant
- w/o = Walkover
- r = Retired
- d = Defaulted

First round
1	(United States) R Kops-Jones (United States) A Spears	3	6	[10]
(China) C Liang (China) Y Wang	6	1	[6]
(Japan) S Aoyama (Czech Republic) R Voráčová	6	6
(Japan) K Date-Krumm (Slovakia) D Hantuchová	3	1
4	(Zimbabwe) C Black (United States) L Raymond	6	7^{7}
(Australia) J Gajdošová (Croatia) A Tomljanović	2	6^{2}
(Slovakia) J Husárová (Poland) P Kania	4	6	[5]
(Chinese Taipei) C-w Chan (China) Y Xu	6	3	[10]
WC	(Czech Republic) L Hradecká (Italy) F Schiavone	4	5
(United Kingdom) J Rae (United Kingdom) A Smith	6	7
(Romania) M Niculescu (Spain) A Parra Santonja	6	7
3	(Chinese Taipei) H-c Chan (Russia) A Kudryavtseva	4	6^{2}
(Chinese Taipei) C-j Chuang (Ukraine) O Savchuk	6	6
(Canada) G Dabrowski (Poland) A Rosolska	3	1
(Australia) C Dellacqua (Croatia) D Jurak	4	4
2	(Chinese Taipei) Y-j Chan (China) J Zheng	6	6

Quarterfinals
1	(United States) R Kops-Jones (United States) A Spears	6	6
(Japan) S Aoyama (Czech Republic) R Voráčová	1	1
4	(Zimbabwe) C Black (United States) L Raymond	2	4
(Chinese Taipei) C-w Chan (China) Y Xu	6	6
(United Kingdom) J Rae (United Kingdom) A Smith	6	6
(Romania) M Niculescu (Spain) A Parra Santonja	1	3
(Chinese Taipei) C-j Chuang (Ukraine) O Savchuk	4	4
2	(Chinese Taipei) Y-j Chan (China) J Zheng	6	6

Semifinals
1	(United States) R Kops-Jones (United States) A Spears	6	6
(Chinese Taipei) C-w Chan (China) Y Xu	1	3
(United Kingdom) J Rae (United Kingdom) A Smith	6	4	[10]
2	(Chinese Taipei) Y-j Chan (China) J Zheng	3	6	[8]

Final
1	(United States) R Kops-Jones (United States) A Spears	3	6	[11]
(United Kingdom) J Rae (United Kingdom) A Smith	6	3	[9]
