= 2014 Nottingham Challenge – Men's doubles =

Men's doubles
- 2014 Nottingham Challenge

Final
- Champion: (Australia) Rameez Junaid; (New Zealand) Michael Venus
- Runner-up: (Belgium) Ruben Bemelmans; (Japan) Go Soeda
- Score: 4–6, 7–6^{(7–1)}, [10–6]

Events
| Singles | men | women |
| Doubles | men | women |
| ← 2013 · | Nottingham Challenge | · 2015 → |

Sanchai Ratiwatana and Sonchat Ratiwatana were the defending champions, but lost in the first round to Jamie Delgado and Gilles Müller.

Rameez Junaid and Michael Venus won the title, defeating Ruben Bemelmans and Go Soeda in the final, 4–6, 7–6^{(7–1)}, [10–6].

== Seeds ==
1. (Australia) Rameez Junaid / (New Zealand) Michael Venus (champions)
2. (Australia) Paul Hanley / (India) Divij Sharan (first round)
3. (Thailand) Sanchai Ratiwatana / (Thailand) Sonchat Ratiwatana (first round)
4. (Germany) Philipp Marx / (Germany) Dominik Meffert (quarterfinals)

== Draw ==
=== Key ===
- Q = Qualifier
- WC = Wild card
- LL = Lucky loser
- Alt = Alternate
- SE = Special exempt
- PR = Protected ranking
- ITF = ITF entry
- JE = Junior exempt
- w/o = Walkover
- r = Retired
- d = Defaulted
- SR = Special ranking

=== Draw ===
First round

Quarterfinals

Semifinals

Final

1
- (Australia) R Junaid
- (New Zealand) M Venus
6
6

WC
- (United Kingdom) L Burton
- (United Kingdom) M Willis
2
4

1
- (Australia) R Junaid
- (New Zealand) M Venus
6
5
[10]

- (Brazil) M Demoliner
- (India) P Raja
4
6^{3}

- (Australia) N Kyrgios
- (Australia) J-P Smith
4
7
[3]

- (Australia) N Kyrgios
- (Australia) J-P Smith
6
7^{7}

1
- (Australia) R Junaid
- (New Zealand) M Venus
6
6^{3}
[10]

3
- (Thailand) Sa Ratiwatana
- (Thailand) So Ratiwatana
6
6^{1}
[10]

- (United Kingdom) J Delgado
- (Luxembourg) G Müller
3
7^{7}
[8]

- (United Kingdom) J Delgado
- (Luxembourg) G Müller
4
7^{7}
[12]

- (United Kingdom) J Delgado
- (Luxembourg) G Müller
6
6

WC
- (United Kingdom) D Rice
- (United Kingdom) S Thornley
4
5

- (United States) J Cerretani
- (Sweden) A Siljeström
2
1

- (United States) J Cerretani
- (Sweden) A Siljeström
6
7

1
- (Australia) R Junaid
- (New Zealand) M Venus
4
7^{7}
[10]

WC
- (United Kingdom) E Corrie
- (United Kingdom) D Smethurst
6
4
[11]

- (Belgium) R Bemelmans
- (Japan) G Soeda
6
6^{1}
[6]

- (United States) R Ram
- (Canada) A Shamasdin
2
6
[9]

WC
- (United Kingdom) E Corrie
- (United Kingdom) D Smethurst
4
7^{7}
[10]

- (Japan) T Ito
- (Japan) H Moriya
1
4

4
- (Germany) P Marx
- (Germany) D Meffert
6
6^{5}
[1]

4
- (Germany) P Marx
- (Germany) D Meffert
6
6

WC
- (United Kingdom) E Corrie
- (United Kingdom) D Smethurst
6^{3}
6^{6}

- (United States) K King
- (Colombia) JC Spir
4
6
[10]

- (Belgium) R Bemelmans
- (Japan) G Soeda
7^{7}
7^{8}

- (United States) A Krajicek
- (United States) R Williams
6
4
[8]

- (United States) K King
- (Colombia) JC Spir
6^{6}
4

- (Belgium) R Bemelmans
- (Japan) G Soeda
2
7
[13]

- (Belgium) R Bemelmans
- (Japan) G Soeda
7^{8}
6

2
- (Australia) P Hanley
- (India) D Sharan
6
5
[11]
