= 1995 Nottingham Open – Doubles =

Doubles
- 1995 Nottingham Open

Final
- Champions: (United States) Luke Jensen (United States) Murphy Jensen
- Runners-up: (United States) Patrick Galbraith (South Africa) Danie Visser
- Score: 6–3, 5–7, 6–4

Details
- Draw: 16
- Seeds: 4

Events
Singles	Doubles
- Nottingham Open

Rick Leach and Danie Visser were the defending champions, but did not partner together this year. Leach partnered Jared Palmer, losing in the semifinals. Visser partnered Patrick Galbraith, losing in the final.

Luke Jensen and Murphy Jensen won the title, defeating Galbraith and Visser 6–3, 5–7, 6–4 in the final.

== Seeds ==
1. (Sweden) Jan Apell / (Sweden) Jonas Björkman (quarterfinals)
2. (United States) Rick Leach / (United States) Jared Palmer (semifinals)
3. (United States) Luke Jensen / (United States) Murphy Jensen (champions)
4. (United States) Patrick Galbraith / (South Africa) Danie Visser (final)

== Draw ==
Key

- Q = Qualifier
- WC = Wild card
- LL = Lucky loser
- Alt = Alternate
- ITF = ITF entry
- PR = Protected ranking
- SR = Special ranking
- SE = Special exempt
- JE = Junior exempt
- JR = Junior Accelerator Programme entrant
- CO = College Accelerator Programme entrant
- NG = Next Gen Accelerator Program entrant
- w/o = Walkover
- r = Retired
- d = Defaulted

=== Draw ===
First round
1	(Sweden) J Apell (Sweden) J Björkman	w/o
(Czech Republic) M Damm (United States) B Shelton
WC	(Denmark) K Carlsen (Chile) M Ríos	5	4
WC	(Sweden) T Enqvist (France) L Roux	7	6
4	(United States) P Galbraith (South Africa) D Visser	6	6
(Italy) C Brandi (South Africa) M Ondruska	2	3
(Argentina) J Frana (South Africa) B Haygarth	6	6
(United States) S Davis (Sweden) P Nyborg	7	7
WC	(United Kingdom) C Beecher (United Kingdom) N Gould	2	6	4
(United Kingdom) B Cowan (United Kingdom) D Sapsford	6	4	6
(France) Antoine Prudent (France) G Raoux	1	6
3	(United States) L Jensen (United States) M Jensen	6	7
(Italy) G Pozzi (United States) M Washington	2	6
(United States) D Randall (United States) G Van Emburgh	6	7
(United Kingdom) J Bates (United Kingdom) T Henman	6	3
2	(United States) R Leach (United States) J Palmer	7	6

Quarterfinals
1	(Sweden) J Apell (Sweden) J Björkman	4	6	3
WC	(Sweden) T Enqvist (France) L Roux	6	4	6
4	(United States) P Galbraith (South Africa) D Visser	6	6
(United States) S Davis (Sweden) P Nyborg	4	2
(United Kingdom) B Cowan (United Kingdom) D Sapsford	3	6
3	(United States) L Jensen (United States) M Jensen	6	7
(United States) D Randall (United States) G Van Emburgh	6	3
2	(United States) R Leach (United States) J Palmer	7	6

Semifinals
WC	(Sweden) T Enqvist (France) L Roux	4	2
4	(United States) P Galbraith (South Africa) D Visser	6	6
3	(United States) L Jensen (United States) M Jensen	6	6
2	(United States) R Leach (United States) J Palmer	2	4

Final
4	(United States) P Galbraith (South Africa) D Visser	3	7	4
3	(United States) L Jensen (United States) M Jensen	6	5	6
