= Tadeja Majerič =

Slovenian tennis player

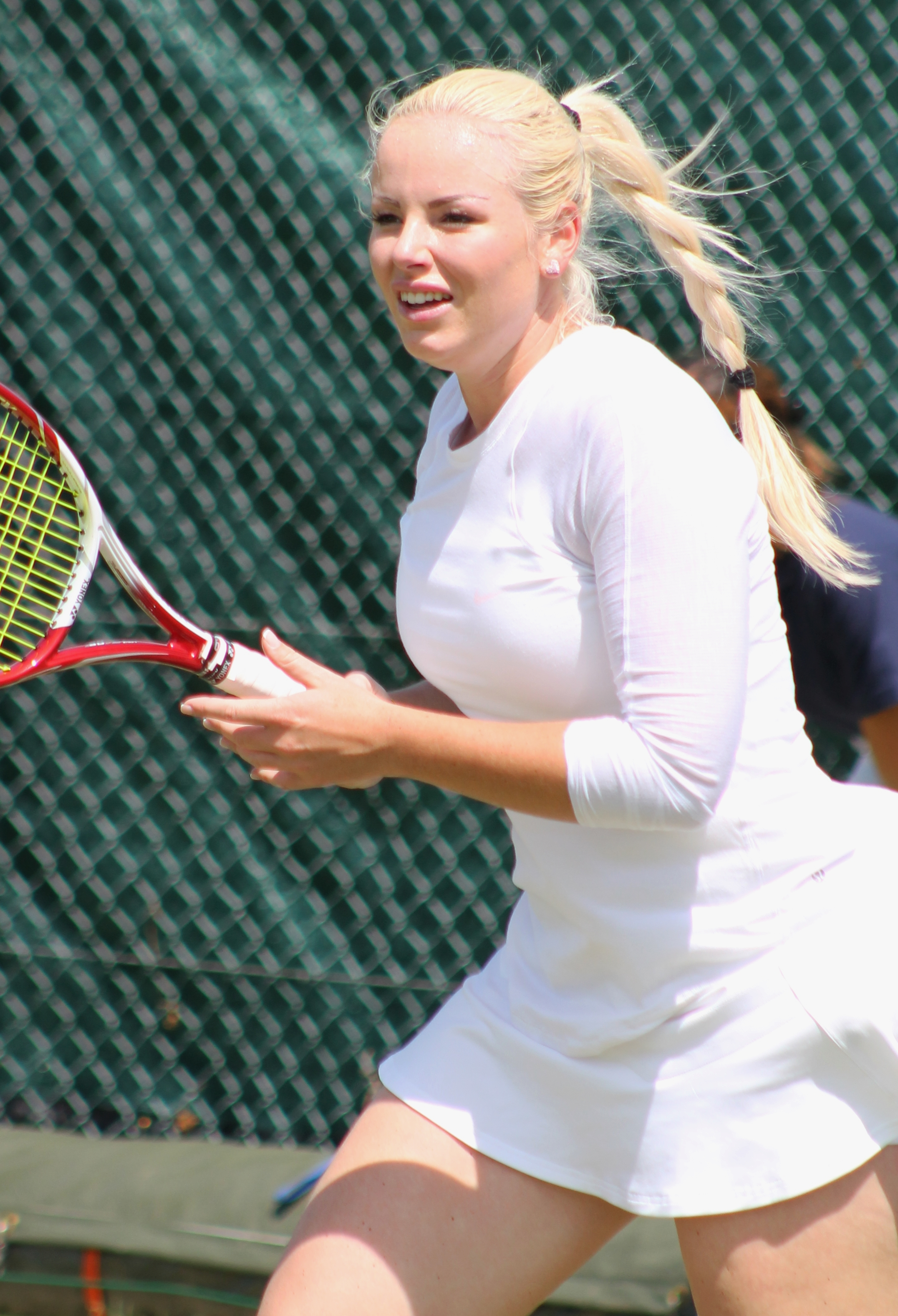
- Majerič at the 2014 Wimbledon qualifying tournament
- Country (sports): Slovenia
- Born: 31 August 1990 (age 36) Maribor, SR Slovenia, SFR Yugoslavia
- Height: 1.78 m (5 ft 10 in)
- Turned pro: 2005
- Plays: Right (two–handed backhand)
- Prize money: $284,908

Singles
- Career record: 298–227
- Career titles: 9 ITF
- Highest ranking: No. 111 (25 November 2013)

Grand Slam singles results
- Australian Open: 1R (2014)
- French Open: Q2 (2013)
- Wimbledon: Q2 (2013)
- US Open: Q1 (2013, 2014)

Doubles
- Career record: 123–126
- Career titles: 6 ITF
- Highest ranking: No. 227 (28 January 2013)

Team competitions
- Fed Cup: 6–2

Tadeja Majerič (born 31 August 1990, in Maribor) is a former tennis player from Slovenia.

Over her career, Majerič won nine singles and six doubles title on the ITF Women's Circuit. On 25 November 2013, she reached her best singles ranking of world No. 111. On 28 January 2013, she peaked at No. 227 in the WTA doubles rankings.

== Career ==
=== 2005–2012 ===
Majerič made her debut on the ITF Women's Circuit in April 2005 as a qualifier at a $10k event in Makarska, Croatia. She reached her first professional final in Zadar the following year, losing in straight sets to Ani Mijačika. 2006 also saw her qualify for the main draw at the Tier IV Slovenia Open in Portorož, defeating Margit Rüütel, Dominika Cibulková and Lucie Hradecká in the qualifying tournament, only to lose to fellow Slovenian Andreja Klepač in round one on her WTA Tour main-draw debut.

In 2007, Majerič played her first matches in national colours for the Slovenia Fed Cup team. In August 2007, she won her first singles tournament in Palić, Serbia. Her second ITF singles title came two years later in Tanjung Selor, Indonesia. After this, she was given a wildcard for the Slovenia Open, losing to world No. 1, Dinara Safina, in the first round.

Majerič made her third appearance for Slovenia, in doubles, at the 2010 Fed Cup. Alongside Maša Zec Peškirič in her home town of Maribor, they defeated the Japanese team in their World Group II playoff rubber. Majerič's first ITF tournament doubles success came in 2010 at her home tournament, the Infond Open. Partnering with Andreja Klepač, she defeated the Russian pair Alexandra Panova and Ksenia Pervak, in straight sets. Her third singles tournament win in January 2011 came on the Indian grass courts of Muzaffarnagar. She won her second doubles tournament in Samsun, Turkey, in the summer of 2012, but it wasn't until the end of 2012 that she was successful again, winning both singles and doubles draws in Pune.

=== 2013 ===
The new season turned out to be Majerič's breakthrough year. In January, a good run in the United States saw her reach two finals in successive weeks, winning the first, but losing the second, both $25k clay-court events.

In February, she qualified for the main draw of the Qatar Ladies Open but lost, again in the first round, to Hsieh Su-wei. After qualifying failures in Katowice and Marrakesh, she travelled to South America, winning a $25k singles event in Caracas, gaining enough important world ranking points to earn her a spot in qualifying for the French Open. After beating María Irigoyen, she faced Argentinian opposition again, this time in the form of fifth seed Paula Ormaechea. Majerič lost in straight sets. In the run-up to Wimbledon, she reached the final of the Nottingham Challenge, a $75k tournament on grass, where she lost to Elena Baltacha in straight sets. Despite being seeded 23rd at Wimbledon qualifying, she could only reach the second round again, losing to Grace Min.

Further first-round main-draw exits followed at the WTA tournaments in Budapest and Bad Gastein, but, at the Baku Cup, Majerič reached the quarterfinals, winning her first career WTA Tour main-draw matches. As a result, she posted a career-best ranking of world No. 115.

Majerič was seeded 16th in US Open qualifying in August, but lost in three sets to Julia Cohen. Back on the ITF Circuit in September, she made the second round of the Trabzon Cup, but lost in qualifying for Guangzhou and Tokyo on the WTA Tour. Her next event followed at the Governor's Cup in Lagos, the first of two $25k tournaments in the Nigerian metropolis. Here in Africa, Majerič won her third title of the year, defeating fellow Slovenian Dalila Jakupović, in straight sets in the final.

== ITF Circuit finals ==
=== Singles: 21 (9 titles, 12 runner-ups) ===
Legend $50,000 tournaments $25,000 tournaments $10,000 tournaments	Finals by surface Hard (5–8) Clay (3–3) Grass (1–1)

Result	No.	Date	Tier	Tournament	Surface	Opponent	Score
Loss	1.	15 May 2006	10,000	ITF Zadar, Croatia	Clay	(Croatia) Ani Mijačika	1–6, 5–7
Win	1.	28 August 2007	10,000	ITF Palić, Serbia	Clay	(Bulgaria) Biljana Pawlowa-Dimitrova	6–2, 6–2
Win	2.	11 May 2009	25,000	ITF Tanjung Selor, Indonesia	Hard (i)	(Thailand) Nudnida Luangnam	6–3, 7–5
Loss	2.	1 February 2010	25,000	ITF Rancho Mirage, United States	Hard	(France) Olivia Sanchez	5–7, 0–6
Win	3.	17 January 2011	25,000	ITF Muzaffarnagar, India	Grass	(China) Zheng Saisai	6–2, 5–7, 6–2
Loss	3.	13 June 2011	25,000	ITF Astana, Kazakhstan	Hard	(Hungary) Tímea Babos	0–6, 2–6
Loss	4.	4 June 2012	25,000	ITF Qarshi, Uzbekistan	Hard	(Ukraine) Nadiya Kichenok	3–6, 6–7^{(3)}
Win	4.	24 December 2012	25,000	ITF Pune, India	Hard	(Turkey) Başak Eraydın	6–2, 6–4
Win	5.	7 January 2013	25,000	ITF Palm Harbor, US	Clay	(Croatia) Ajla Tomljanović	6–2, 6–3
Loss	5.	14 January 2013	25,000	ITF Port St. Lucie, US	Clay	(Canada) Sharon Fichman	3–6, 2–6
Win	6.	29 April 2013	25,000	ITF Caracas, Venezuela	Hard	(Venezuela) Adriana Pérez	1–6, 6–3, 7–5
Loss	6.	10 June 2013	50,000	Nottingham Open, UK	Grass	(United Kingdom) Elena Baltacha	5–7, 6–7^{(7)}
Win	7.	14 October 2013	25,000	Lagos Open, Nigeria	Hard	(Slovenia) Dalila Jakupović	7–5, 7–5
Loss	7.	10 November 2014	25,000	ITF Mumbai, India	Hard	(Russia) Marina Melnikova	2–6, 6–7^{(4)}
Loss	8.	16 February 2015	25,000	ITF New Delhi, India	Hard	(Poland) Magda Linette	1–6, 1–6
Loss	9.	7 December 2015	25,000	Lagos Open, Nigeria	Hard	(France) Tessah Andrianjafitrimo	3–6, 7–5, 4–6
Loss	10.	14 December 2015	25,000	Lagos Open, Nigeria	Hard	(Switzerland) Conny Perrin	6–3, 4–6, 6–7^{(6)}
Win	8.	11 January 2016	25,000	ITF Aurangabad, India	Clay	(Ukraine) Valeriya Strakhova	6–4, 6–3
Loss	11.	27 June 2016	25,000+H	Bella Cup, Poland	Clay	(Bulgaria) Isabella Shinikova	5–7, 6–4, 2–6
Win	9.	16 October 2016	25,000	Lagos Open, Nigeria	Hard	(Switzerland) Conny Perrin	3–6, 6–1, 6–1
Loss	12.	23 October 2016	25,000	Lagos Open, Nigeria	Hard	(Switzerland) Conny Perrin	3–6, 3–6

=== Doubles: 16 (6 titles, 10 runner-ups) ===
Legend $50,000 tournaments $25,000 tournaments $10,000 tournaments	Finals by surface Hard (4–5) Clay (2–4) Carpet (0–1)

Result	No.	Date	Tier	Tournament	Surface	Partner	Opponents	Score
Loss	1.	Apr 2008	50,000	Makarska Ladies Open, Croatia	Clay	(Slovenia) Maša Zec Peškirič	(Slovenia) Polona Hercog (Liechtenstein) Stephanie Vogt	5–7, 2–6
Loss	2.	Jul 2008	25,000	ITF Zwevegem, Belgium	Clay	(Czech Republic) Iveta Gerlová	(Netherlands) Daniëlle Harmsen (Netherlands) Kim Kilsdonk	4–6, 2–6
Loss	3.	Aug 2008	25,000	ITF Moscow, Russia	Clay	(Russia) Natalia Ryzhonkova	(Russia) Vitalia Diatchenko (Russia) Eugeniya Pashkova	0–6, 1–6
Win	1.	May 2010	50,000	Maribor Open, Slovenia	Clay	(Slovenia) Andreja Klepač	(Russia) Alexandra Panova (Russia) Ksenia Pervak	6–3, 7–6^{(6)}
Win	2.	Jul 2011	25,000	ITF Samsun, Turkey	Hard	(Romania) Mihaela Buzărnescu	(Turkey) Çağla Büyükakçay (Turkey) Pemra Özgen	6–1, 6–4
Loss	4.	Oct 2011	25,000	Lagos Open, Nigeria	Hard	(Bulgaria) Aleksandrina Naydenova	(Russia) Nina Bratchikova (Austria) Melanie Klaffner	5–7, 7–5, [6–10]
Loss	5.	Mar 2012	25,000	ITF Bangalore, India	Hard	(Slovenia) Anja Prislan	(Belgium) Tamaryn Hendler (Austria) Melanie Klaffner	2–6, 6–4, [6–10]
Loss	6.	Jul 2012	25,000	ITF Imola, Italy	Carpet	(Russia) Marina Melnikova	(Italy) Alice Balducci (Italy) Federica di Sarra	w/o
Loss	7.	Aug 2012	25,000	ITF Mamaia, Romania	Clay	(Montenegro) Danka Kovinić	(Romania) Elena Bogdan (Romania) Raluca Olaru	6–7^{(4)}, 3–6
Win	3.	Dec 2012	25,000	Pune Open, India	Hard	(Switzerland) Conny Perrin	(China) Lu Jiajing (China) Lu Jiaxiang	3–6, 7–5, [10–6]
Loss	8.	Nov 2013	50,000	Kemer Cup Istanbul, Turkey	Hard (i)	(Romania) Andreea Mitu	(Uzbekistan) Nigina Abduraimova (Italy) Maria Elena Camerin	3–6, 6–2, [8–10]
Win	4.	Jun 2015	25,000	Fergana Challenger, Uzbekistan	Hard	(India) Sharmada Balu	(Uzbekistan) Vlada Ekshibarova (India) Natasha Palha	7–5, 6–3
Win	5.	Sep 2015	25,000	ITF Monterrey, Mexico	Hard	(Switzerland) Conny Perrin	(Chile) Alexa Guarachi (Chinese Taipei) Hsu Chieh-yu	7–5, 6–3
Loss	9.	Dec 2015	25,000	Lagos Open, Nigeria	Hard	(Switzerland) Conny Perrin	(Bulgaria) Julia Terziyska (India) Prarthana Thombare	6–4, 3–6, [8–10]
Win	6.	Jun 2016	25,000	ITF Lenzerheide, Switzerland	Clay	(Bulgaria) Aleksandrina Naydenova	(Romania) Irina Bara (Belgium) Elyne Boeykens	7–5, 1–6, [10–8]
Loss	10.	Oct 2017	25,000	Lagos Open, Nigeria	Hard	(United Kingdom) Tiffany William	(Switzerland) Conny Perrin (Ukraine) Valeriya Strakhova	1–6, 2–6
