= Mark Petchey =

British tennis player

- Full name: Mark Rodney James Petchey
- Country (sports): United Kingdom
- Residence: Wimbledon, London, England
- Born: 1 August 1970 (age 56) Loughton, Essex, England
- Height: 6 ft 0 in (1.83 m)
- Turned pro: 1988
- Retired: 1998
- Plays: Right-handed (one-handed backhand)
- Prize money: $657,776

Singles
- Career record: 35–73
- Career titles: 0
- Highest ranking: No. 80 (8 August 1994)

Grand Slam singles results
- Australian Open: 1R (1995)
- French Open: Q2 (1994, 1996)
- Wimbledon: 3R (1997)
- US Open: 2R (1994)

Doubles
- Career record: 34–55
- Career titles: 1
- Highest ranking: No. 104 (5 August 1996)

Mark Rodney James Petchey (born 1 August 1970) is a former tennis player from England, who turned professional in 1988.

He now works as a tennis commentator and analyst for Amazon Prime, ITV, the BBC, the Tennis Channel, Tennis Australia and others. Since early 2025, he has been coaching Emma Raducanu.

== Personal life ==
Petchey was educated at Forest School, a private school in north-east London.

His first coach was his father, Rod.

Mark married Michelle on 5 July 1996 in Warwickshire: they have two daughters.

== Tennis career ==
=== Juniors ===
Junior Slam results:

Australian Open: -
French Open: 1R (1988)
Wimbledon: 2R (1988)
US Open: 3R (1987)

=== Pro tour ===
The right-hander won one doubles title (Nottingham in 1996) in his career. He reached his career-high ATP singles ranking of World No. 80 in August 1994, winning 3 Challenger events. His best performance in a Grand Slam came in the 1997 Wimbledon Championships. He defeated Ján Krošlák and Tommy Haas before losing to Boris Becker in the third round.

=== As a coach ===
He coached Silvija Talaja to the world's Top 20 and Tina Pisnik to the Top 30.

He was also coach to Andy Murray whom he coached to the Top 50. Since 2025, Petchey coaches Emma Raducanu in-between his commentary work, this was an arrangement until at least Wimbledon.

== Career finals ==
=== Doubles (1 win, 1 loss) ===
Legend
Grand Slam (0)
Tennis Masters Cup (0)
ATP Masters Series (0)
ATP Tour (1)

Result	No.	Date	Tournament	Surface	Partner	Opponents	Score
Loss	1.	Aug 1994	Long Island, U.S.	Hard	(Australia) Andrew Florent	(France) Olivier Delaître (France) Guy Forget	4–6, 6–7
Win	2.	Jun 1996	Nottingham, United Kingdom	Grass	(United Kingdom) Danny Sapsford	(United Kingdom) Neil Broad (South Africa) Piet Norval	6–7, 7–6, 6–4
