= Danny Sapsford =

British tennis player

- Country (sports): United Kingdom
- Residence: Weybridge, Surrey, England
- Born: 3 April 1969 (age 56); Walton-on-Thames, Surrey, England
- Height: 1.72 m (5 ft 8 in)
- Turned pro: 1989
- Retired: 2000
- Plays: Right-handed
- Prize money: $450,722

Singles
- Career record: 18–32
- Career titles: 0; 0 Challenger, 0 Futures
- Highest ranking: No. 170 (15 April 1996)

Grand Slam singles results
- Australian Open: Q3 (1989)
- French Open: Q1 (1996, 1997, 1998)
- Wimbledon: 3R (1999)
- US Open: 2R (1991)

Doubles
- Career record: 30–45
- Career titles: 1; 8 Challenger, 1 Futures
- Highest ranking: No. 83 (12 October 1998)

Grand Slam doubles results
- Australian Open: 1R (1998)
- French Open: 2R (1998)
- Wimbledon: 2R (1990, 1991, 1996)
- US Open: 3R (1998)

Grand Slam mixed doubles results
- Wimbledon: 3R (1996, 1997)
- Last updated on: 8 February 2022.

Danny Sapsford (born 3 April 1969) is a former professional tennis player from Great Britain, who turned professional in 1989. He won one doubles title (1996, Nottingham) during his career. The right-hander reached his highest singles ATP-ranking on 15 April 1996, when he became World No. 170. In 1999, he reached the third round of Wimbledon Championships, defeating Julián Alonso and Galo Blanco before losing to then world number one Pete Sampras in straight sets. This was Sapsford's last singles match as a professional. After retiring, Sapsford became a tennis coach, and runs a tennis charity.

== Performance timelines ==
Key
W	F	SF	QF	#R	RR	Q#	DNQ	A	NH

(W) winner; (F) finalist; (SF) semifinalist; (QF) quarterfinalist; (#R) rounds 4, 3, 2, 1; (RR) round-robin stage; (Q#) qualification round; (DNQ) did not qualify; (A) absent; (NH) not held; (SR) strike rate (events won / competed); (W–L) win–loss record.

=== Singles ===
Tournament	1988	1989	1990	1991	1992	1993	1994	1995	1996	1997	1998	1999	SR	W–L	Win %
Grand Slam tournaments
Australian Open	A	Q3	A	Q1	A	Q2	A	A	Q1	A	Q1	A	0 / 0	0–0	–
French Open	A	A	A	A	A	A	A	A	Q1	Q1	Q1	A	0 / 0	0–0	–
Wimbledon	Q1	Q1	1R	1R	Q1	Q1	Q1	1R	2R	2R	1R	3R	0 / 7	4–7	36%
US Open	A	A	A	2R	Q1	A	Q2	Q3	Q3	Q1	Q2	A	0 / 1	1–1	50%
Win–loss	0–0	0–0	0–1	1–2	0–0	0–0	0–0	0–1	1–1	1–1	0–1	2–1	0 / 8	5–8	38%
Olympic Games
Summer Olympics	Q1	Not Held			A	Not Held			A	Not Held			0 / 0	0–0	–
ATP Tour Masters 1000
Miami	A	A	A	A	A	A	A	A	Q3	A	Q1	A	0 / 0	0–0	–
Stuttgart	A	A	A	A	A	A	A	A	Q1	A	A	A	0 / 0	0–0	–
Win–loss	0–0	0–0	0–0	0–0	0–0	0–0	0–0	0–0	0–0	0–0	0–0	0–0	0 / 0	0–0	–

=== Doubles ===
Tournament	1989	1990	1991	1992	1993	1994	1995	1996	1997	1998	1999	SR	W–L	Win %
Grand Slam tournaments
Australian Open	A	A	A	A	A	A	A	A	A	1R	A	0 / 1	0–1	0%
French Open	A	A	A	A	A	A	A	A	A	2R	A	0 / 1	1–1	50%
Wimbledon	Q1	2R	2R	1R	Q1	Q1	1R	2R	1R	1R	1R	0 / 8	3–8	27%
US Open	A	A	A	A	A	A	A	1R	A	3R	A	0 / 2	2–2	50%
Win–loss	0–0	1–1	1–1	0–1	0–0	0–0	0–1	1–2	0–1	3–4	0–1	0 / 12	6–12	33%
ATP Tour Masters 1000
Miami	A	A	A	A	A	A	A	Q1	A	2R	A	0 / 1	1–1	50%
Win–loss	0–0	0–0	0–0	0–0	0–0	0–0	0–0	0–0	0–0	1–1	0–0	0 / 1	1–1	50%

== ATP career finals ==
=== Doubles: 3 (1 title, 2 runner-ups) ===
Legend Grand Slam Tournaments (0–0) ATP World Tour Finals (0–0) ATP Masters Series (0–0) ATP Championship Series (0–0) ATP World Series (1–2)	Finals by surface Hard (0–1) Clay (0–0) Grass (1–1) Carpet (0–0)	Finals by setting Outdoors (1–2) Indoors (0–0)

Result	W–L	Date	Tournament	Tier	Surface	Partner	Opponents	Score
Loss	0–1	Sep 1995	Bordeaux, France	World Series	Hard	(Sweden) Henrik Holm	(Croatia) Saša Hiršzon (Croatia) Goran Ivanišević	3–6, 4–6
Win	1–1	Jun 1996	Nottingham, United Kingdom	World Series	Grass	(United Kingdom) Mark Petchey	(United Kingdom) Neil Broad (South Africa) Piet Norval	6–7, 7–6, 6–4
Loss	1–2	Jun 1997	Nottingham, United Kingdom	World Series	Grass	(United Kingdom) Chris Wilkinson	(South Africa) Ellis Ferreira (United States) Patrick Galbraith	6–4, 6–7, 6–7

== ATP Challenger and ITF Futures finals ==
=== Doubles: 9 (9–0) ===
Legend ATP Challenger (8–0) ITF Futures (1–0)	Finals by surface Hard (6–0) Clay (1–0) Grass (1–0) Carpet (1–0)

Result	W–L	Date	Tournament	Tier	Surface	Partner	Opponents	Score
Win	1–0	Sep 1994	Azores, Portugal	Challenger	Hard	(United Kingdom) Chris Wilkinson	(Portugal) Emanuel Couto (Israel) Eyal Ran	7–5, 6–1
Win	2–0	Oct 1994	Dublin, Ireland	Challenger	Carpet	(United Kingdom) Chris Wilkinson	(Germany) Arne Thoms (Netherlands) Fernon Wibier	7–6, 2–6, 6–3
Win	3–0	Oct 1994	Jakarta, Indonesia	Challenger	Hard	(United Kingdom) Andrew Foster	(India) Mahesh Bhupathi (India) Leander Paes	walkover
Win	4–0	Jul 1995	Newcastle, United Kingdom	Challenger	Hard	(United Kingdom) Andrew Foster	(Socialist Federal Republic of Yugoslavia) Nebojsa Djordjevic (Switzerland) Lorenzo Manta	3–6, 6–1, 6–2
Win	5–0	Mar 1996	Stockholm, Sweden	Challenger	Hard	(United Kingdom) Andrew Foster	(South Africa) Lan Bale (South Africa) Brent Haygarth	6–3, 6–1
Win	6–0	Aug 1996	Istanbul, Turkey	Challenger	Hard	(United Kingdom) Mark Petchey	(Uzbekistan) Oleg Ogorodov (Belarus) Orlin Stanoytchev	6–3, 7–5
Win	7–0	Jul 1997	Manchester, United Kingdom	Challenger	Grass	(United Kingdom) Mark Petchey	(Israel) Noam Behr (Switzerland) Filippo Veglio	6–3, 6–7, 7–6
Win	8–0	Nov 1997	Portorož, Slovenia	Challenger	Hard	(United Kingdom) Chris Wilkinson	(Croatia) Saša Hiršzon (Austria) Udo Plamberger	6–0, 3–6, 6–3
Win	9–0	May 1999	Great Britain F5, Hatfield	Futures	Clay	(United Kingdom) Simon Dickson	(France) Sébastien de Chaunac (France) Olivier Mutis	7–5, 6–0
