= Nottingham Open =

Coordinates: 52°56′6″N 1°11′26″W

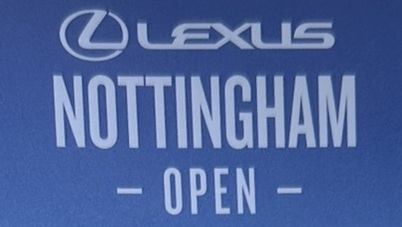

Tournament information
- Event name: Nottingham Open presented by The Sunday Telegraph (2004); The 10tele.com Open (2005); Red letter DAYS Open (2006); Nature Valley Open The Nottingham Open (2007); The Slazenger Open (2008); Aegon Nottingham Challenge (2011–2014); Aegon Nottingham Open (2015–2017); Nature Valley Open (2018–19); Viking Open (2021); Rothesay Open Nottingham (2022–2024); Lexus Nottingham Open (2025–)
- Founded: 1887; 139 years ago (men); 1887; 139 years ago (women)
- Location: Nottingham; United Kingdom
- Venue: Lexus Nottingham Tennis Centre
- Surface: Grass – outdoors
- Website: lta.org.uk

Current champions (2026)
- Men's singles: (Australia) Christopher O'Connell
- Women's singles: (Czech Republic) Marie Bouzková
- Men's doubles: (Brazil) Fernando Romboli (United States) Theodore Winegar
- Women's doubles: (United Kingdom) Harriet Dart (United Kingdom) Maia Lumsden
ATP Tour
- Category: ATP Challenger 125
- Draw: 32S / 16Q / 16D
- Prize money: €203,900 (2026)
WTA Tour
- Category: WTA 250
- Draw: 32S / 24Q / 16D
- Prize money: US$283,347 (2026)

The Lexus Nottingham Open (originally known as the Nottingham Championships or Nottingham Lawn Tennis Tournament (1887–1967)) is a professional tennis tournament held in Nottingham, United Kingdom, played on outdoor grass courts at the Lexus Nottingham Tennis Centre. The tournament is held in June as a grass court warm-up for Wimbledon.

After being discontinued in 2008, it was downgraded in 2011 to ATP Challenger Tour and ITF Women's Circuit, briefly re-established as an ATP World Tour 250 event on the ATP Tour in 2015 and 2016, before returning to a Challenger event in 2017. Since 2015 it has been an WTA International event on the WTA Tour.

== History ==
The event was founded in 1887 as the Nottingham Championships until 1967. At the start of the open era in 1968 it became part of the independent International Tennis Federation annual tour until 1973. In 1971 it was previously known as John Player Nottingham Tennis Tournament, John Player Open, Samsung Open, Aegon Open Nottingham and Nature Valley Open among other names. Originally a replacement of the Manchester Open and was part of the Grand Prix tennis circuit from (1973–77), it was also a Grand Prix Super Series prestigious event (1974–75), which was discontinued after the 2008 edition, and the International Women's Open at Eastbourne became a combined event for both male and female players.

Nottingham City Council bosses announced their "extreme disappointment" at having Nottingham Open removed from the ATP Tour. The event had, according to the council, been partly responsible for stimulating interest in tennis in Nottingham. Roger Draper, the head of the Lawn Tennis Association (LTA) responded by saying that the changes would introduce tennis to a "new audience". It was announced later in 2008 that Nottingham would host a new tennis event, the Aegon Nottingham Trophy, in lieu of the Surbiton Trophy, which was completely cancelled, in 2009. The new event was an ATP Challenger Series event, one level lower than the main ATP Tour. The Nottingham Tennis Centre, which had hosted the Open, had undergone refurbishments costing £735,000 in 2008, and councillor Dave Trimble called it "great news" to have a new tennis event in the city.

== Past finals ==
=== Men's singles ===
Year	Champion	Runner-up	Score
1970	(United States) Stan Smith	(United States) Chauncey Steele	6–3, 6–1
1971	(Chile) Jaime Fillol	(Australia) Greg Perkins	6–2, 6–3
1972	(Australia) Geoff Masters	(India) Premjit Lall	abandoned due to rain
1973	(United States) Eric van Dillen	(South Africa) Frew McMillan	3–6, 6–1, 6–1
1974	(United States) Stan Smith (2)	(Soviet Union) Alex Metreveli	6–3, 1–6, 6–3
1975	(Netherlands) Tom Okker	(Australia) Tony Roche	6–1, 3–6, 6–3
1976	No winner	(United States) Jimmy Connors (Romania) Ilie Năstase	6–2, 4–6 1–1 abandoned
1977	No winner	(United States) Tim Gullikson (Chile) Jaime Fillol	abandoned
1978–1994	Cancelled without organisation		
1995	(Argentina) Javier Frana	(Australia) Todd Woodbridge	7–6^{(7–4)}, 6–3
1996	(Netherlands) Jan Siemerink	(Australia) Sandon Stolle	6–3, 7–6^{(7–0)}
1997	(United Kingdom) Greg Rusedski	(Slovakia) Karol Kučera	6–4, 7–5
1998	(Sweden) Jonas Björkman	(Zimbabwe) Byron Black	6–3, 6–2
1999	(France) Cédric Pioline	(Zimbabwe) Kevin Ullyett	6–3, 7–5
2000	(France) Sébastien Grosjean	(Zimbabwe) Byron Black	7–6^{(9–7)}, 6–3
2001	(Sweden) Thomas Johansson	(Israel) Harel Levy	7–5, 6–3
2002	(Sweden) Jonas Björkman (2)	(Australia) Wayne Arthurs	6–2, 6–7^{(5–7)}, 6–2
2003	(United Kingdom) Greg Rusedski (2)	(United States) Mardy Fish	6–3, 6–2
2004	(Thailand) Paradorn Srichaphan	(Sweden) Thomas Johansson	1–6, 7–6^{(7–4)}, 6–3
2005	(France) Richard Gasquet	(Belarus) Max Mirnyi	6–2, 6–3
2006	(France) Richard Gasquet (2)	(Sweden) Jonas Björkman	6–4, 6–3
2007	(Croatia) Ivo Karlović	(France) Arnaud Clément	3–6, 6–4, 6–4
2008	(Croatia) Ivo Karlović (2)	(Spain) Fernando Verdasco	7–5, 6–7^{(4–7)}, 7–6^{(8–6)}
ATP Tour event (1970–2008)
2009–2010	Cancelled without organisation		
2011	(Israel) Dudi Sela	(France) Jérémy Chardy	6–4, 3–6, 7–5
2012	(Slovenia) Grega Žemlja	(Slovakia) Karol Beck	7–6^{(7–3)}, 4–6, 6–4
2013	(United States) Steve Johnson	(Belgium) Ruben Bemelmans	7–5, 7–5
2014	(Australia) Nick Kyrgios	(Australia) Samuel Groth	7–6^{(7–3)}, 7–6^{(9–7)}
ATP Challenger Tour (2011–2014)
2015	(Uzbekistan) Denis Istomin	(United States) Sam Querrey	7–6^{(7–1)}, 7–6^{(8–6)}
2016	(United States) Steve Johnson	(Uruguay) Pablo Cuevas	7–6^{(7–5)}, 7–5
ATP Tour event (2015–2016)
2017	(Israel) Dudi Sela	(Italy) Thomas Fabbiano	4–6, 6–4, 6–3
2018	(Australia) Alex de Minaur	(United Kingdom) Dan Evans	7–6^{(7–4)}, 7–5
2019	(United Kingdom) Dan Evans	(Russia) Evgeny Donskoy	7–6^{(7–3)}, 6–3
2020	Completely cancelled due to the COVID-19 pandemic		
2021	(United States) Frances Tiafoe	(United States) Denis Kudla	6–1, 6–3
2022	(United Kingdom) Dan Evans (2)	(Australia) Jordan Thompson	6–4, 6–4
2023	(United Kingdom) Andy Murray	(France) Arthur Cazaux	6–4, 6–4
2024	(United Kingdom) Jacob Fearnley	(United Kingdom) Charles Broom	4–6, 6–4, 6–3
2025	(Croatia) Marin Čilić	(Japan) Shintaro Mochizuki	6–2, 6–3
2026	(Australia) Christopher O'Connell	(Finland) Otto Virtanen	7–6^{(7–3)}, 7–6^{(8–6)}
ATP Challenger Tour (2017–present)

=== Women's singles ===
Year	Champion	Runner-up	Score
1971	(United States) Julie Heldman	(Australia) Barbara Hawcroft	6–4, 7–9, 6–3
1972	(United States) Billie Jean King	(Australia) Evonne Goolagong	unfinished (rain) (Note: This was a round robin event. King finished first and Goolagong second.)
1973	(United States) Billie Jean King (2)	(United Kingdom) Virginia Wade	8–6, 6–4
1974–2010	Completely cancelled without organisation		
↓ ITF Women's Circuit tournament ↓
2011	(United Kingdom) Elena Baltacha	(Czech Republic) Petra Cetkovská	7–5, 6–3
2012	(Australia) Ashleigh Barty	(Germany) Tatjana Malek	6–1, 6–1
2013	(United Kingdom) Elena Baltacha (2)	(Slovenia) Tadeja Majerič	7–5, 7–6^{(9–7)}
2014	(Australia) Jarmila Gajdošová	(Switzerland) Timea Bacsinszky	6–2, 6–2
↓ WTA International tournament ↓
2015	(Croatia) Ana Konjuh	(Romania) Monica Niculescu	1–6, 6–4, 6–2
2016	(Czech Republic) Karolína Plíšková	(United States) Alison Riske	7–6^{(10–8)}, 7–5
2017	(Croatia) Donna Vekić	(United Kingdom) Johanna Konta	2–6, 7–6^{(7–3)}, 7–5
2018	(Australia) Ashleigh Barty (2)	(United Kingdom) Johanna Konta	6–3, 3–6, 6–4
2019	(France) Caroline Garcia	(Croatia) Donna Vekić	2–6, 7–6^{(7–4)}, 7–6^{(7–4)}
2020	Completely cancelled due to the COVID-19 pandemic		
2021	(United Kingdom) Johanna Konta	(China) Zhang Shuai	6–2, 6–1
2022	(Brazil) Beatriz Haddad Maia	(United States) Alison Riske	6–4, 1–6, 6–3
2023	(United Kingdom) Katie Boulter	(United Kingdom) Jodie Burrage	6–3, 6–3
2024	(United Kingdom) Katie Boulter (2)	(Czech Republic) Karolína Plíšková	4–6, 6–3, 6–2
2025	(United States) McCartney Kessler	(Ukraine) Dayana Yastremska	6–4, 7–5
2026	(Czech Republic) Marie Bouzková	(United States) Emma Navarro	7–6^{(7–5)}, 4–6, 6–2

=== Men's doubles ===
Year	Champions	Runners-up	Score
1995	(United States) Luke Jensen (United States) Murphy Jensen	(United States) Patrick Galbraith (South Africa) Danie Visser	6–2, 6–4
1996	(United Kingdom) Mark Petchey (United Kingdom) Danny Sapsford	(United Kingdom) Neil Broad (South Africa) Piet Norval	6–7, 7–6, 6–4
1997	(South Africa) Ellis Ferreira (United States) Patrick Galbraith	(United Kingdom) Danny Sapsford (United Kingdom) Chris Wilkinson	4–6, 7–6, 7–6
1998	(United States) Justin Gimelstob (South Africa) Byron Talbot	(Canada) Sébastien Lareau (Canada) Daniel Nestor	7–5, 6–7, 6–4
1999	(United States) Patrick Galbraith (2) (United States) Justin Gimelstob (2)	(South Africa) Marius Barnard (South Africa) Brent Haygarth	5–7, 7–5, 6–3
2000	(South Africa) Piet Norval (United States) Donald Johnson	(South Africa) Ellis Ferreira (United States) Rick Leach	1–6, 6–4, 6–3
2001	(United States) Donald Johnson (2) (United States) Jared Palmer	(Australia) Paul Hanley (Australia) Andrew Kratzmann	6–4, 6–2
2002	(United States) Mike Bryan (The Bahamas) Mark Knowles	(United States) Donald Johnson (United States) Jared Palmer	0–6, 7–6^{(7–3)}, 6–4
2003	(United States) Bob Bryan (United States) Mike Bryan (2)	(Australia) Joshua Eagle (United States) Jared Palmer	7–6^{(7–3)}, 4–6, 7–6^{(7–4)}
2004	(Australia) Paul Hanley (Australia) Todd Woodbridge	(United States) Rick Leach (United States) Brian MacPhie	6–4, 6–3
2005	(Israel) Jonathan Erlich (Israel) Andy Ram	(Sweden) Simon Aspelin (Australia) Todd Perry	4–6, 6–3, 7–5
2006	(Israel) Jonathan Erlich (2) (Israel) Andy Ram (2)	(Russia) Igor Kunitsyn (Russia) Dmitry Tursunov	6–3, 6–2
2007	(United Kingdom) Jamie Murray (United States) Eric Butorac	(United Kingdom) Joshua Goodall (United Kingdom) Ross Hutchins	4–6, 6–3, 10–5
2008	(Brazil) Bruno Soares (Zimbabwe) Kevin Ullyett	(South Africa) Jeff Coetzee (United Kingdom) Jamie Murray	6–2, 7–6^{(7–5)}
ATP Tour event (1995–2008)
2009–2010	Tournaments cancelled without organisation		
2011	(South Africa) Rik de Voest (Canada) Adil Shamasdin	(Philippines) Treat Conrad Huey (South Africa) Izak van der Merwe	6–3, 7–6^{(11–9)}
2012	(France) Olivier Charroin (Austria) Martin Fischer	(Russia) Evgeny Donskoy (Russia) Andrey Kuznetsov	6–4, 7–6^{(8–6)}
2013	(Thailand) Sanchai Ratiwatana (Thailand) Sonchat Ratiwatana	(India) Purav Raja (India) Divij Sharan	7–6^{(7–5)}, 6–7^{(3–7)}, [10–8]
2014	(Australia) Rameez Junaid (New Zealand) Michael Venus	(Belgium) Ruben Bemelmans (Japan) Go Soeda	4–6, 7–6^{(7–1)}, [10–6]
ATP Challenger Tour (2011–2014)
2015	(Australia) Chris Guccione (Brazil) André Sá	(Uruguay) Pablo Cuevas (Spain) David Marrero	6–2, 7–5
2016	(United Kingdom) Dominic Inglot (Canada) Daniel Nestor	(Croatia) Ivan Dodig (Brazil) Marcelo Melo	7–5, 7–6^{(7–4)}
ATP Tour event (2015–2016)
2017	(United Kingdom) Ken Skupski (United Kingdom) Neal Skupski	(Australia) Matt Reid (Australia) John-Patrick Smith	7–6^{(7–1)}, 2–6, [10–7]
2018	(Denmark) Frederik Nielsen (United Kingdom) Joe Salisbury	(United States) Austin Krajicek (India) Jeevan Nedunchezhiyan	7–6^{(7–5)}, 6–1
2019	(Mexico) Santiago González (Pakistan) Aisam-ul-Haq Qureshi	(China) Gong Maoxin (China) Zhang Ze	4–6, 7–6^{(7–5)}, [10–5]
2020	Tournament cancelled due to the COVID-19 pandemic		
2021	(Australia) Matt Reid (United Kingdom) Ken Skupski (2)	(Australia) Matthew Ebden (Australia) John-Patrick Smith	4–6, 7–5, [10–6]
2022	(United Kingdom) Jonny O'Mara (United Kingdom) Ken Skupski (3)	(United Kingdom) Julian Cash (United Kingdom) Henry Patten	3–6, 6–2, [16–14]
2023	(United Kingdom) Jacob Fearnley (United Kingdom) Johannus Monday	(United Kingdom) Liam Broady (United Kingdom) Jonny O'Mara	6–3, 6–7^{(6–8)}, [10–7]
2024	(Australia) John Peers (United Kingdom) Marcus Willis	(France) Harold Mayot (Australia) Luke Saville	6–1, 6–7^{(1–7)}, [10–7]
2025	(Mexico) Santiago González (2) (United States) Austin Krajicek	(Brazil) Fernando Romboli (Australia) John-Patrick Smith	7–6^{(7–2)}, 6–4
2026	(Brazil) Fernando Romboli (United States) Theodore Winegar	(United States) Mac Kiger (United States) Reese Stalder	6–3, 6–4
ATP Challenger Tour (2017–present)

=== Women's doubles ===
Year	Champions	Runners-up	Score
1973	(United States) Rosie Casals (United States) Billie Jean King	(United States) Chris Evert (Netherlands) Betty Stöve	6–2, 9–7
1974–2010	Cancelled without organisation		
↓ ITF Women's Circuit tournament ↓
2011	(Czech Republic) Eva Birnerová (Czech Republic) Petra Cetkovská	(Russia) Regina Kulikova (Russia) Evgeniya Rodina	6–3, 6–2
2012	(Australia) Ashleigh Barty (Australia) Sally Peers	(Hungary) Réka Luca Jani (Portugal) Maria João Koehler	7–6^{(7–2)}, 3–6, [10–5]
2013	(France) Julie Coin (France) Stéphanie Foretz Gacon	(Israel) Julia Glushko (Japan) Erika Sema	6–2, 6–4
2014	(Australia) Jarmila Gajdošová (Australia) Arina Rodionova	(Paraguay) Verónica Cepede Royg (Liechtenstein) Stephanie Vogt	7–6^{(7–0)}, 6–1
↓ WTA International tournament ↓
2015	(United States) Raquel Kops-Jones (United States) Abigail Spears	(United Kingdom) Jocelyn Rae (United Kingdom) Anna Smith	3–6, 6–3, [11–9]
2016	(Czech Republic) Andrea Hlaváčková (China) Peng Shuai	(Canada) Gabriela Dabrowski (China) Yang Zhaoxuan	7–5, 3–6, [10–7]
2017	(Australia) Monique Adamczak (Australia) Storm Sanders	(United Kingdom) Jocelyn Rae (United Kingdom) Laura Robson	6–4, 4–6, [10–4]
2018	(Poland) Alicja Rosolska (United States) Abigail Spears (2)	(Romania) Mihaela Buzărnescu (United Kingdom) Heather Watson	6–3, 7–6^{(7–5)}
2019	(United States) Desirae Krawczyk (Mexico) Giuliana Olmos	(Australia) Ellen Perez (Australia) Arina Rodionova	7–6^{(7–5)}, 7–5
2020	Cancelled due to the COVID-19 pandemic		
2021	(Ukraine) Lyudmyla Kichenok (Japan) Makoto Ninomiya	(United States) Caroline Dolehide (Australia) Storm Sanders	6–4, 6–7^{(3–7)}, [10–8]
2022	(Brazil) Beatriz Haddad Maia (China) Zhang Shuai	(United States) Caroline Dolehide (Romania) Monica Niculescu	7–6^{(7–2)}, 6–3
2023	(Norway) Ulrikke Eikeri (Estonia) Ingrid Neel	(United Kingdom) Harriet Dart (United Kingdom) Heather Watson	7–6^{(8–6)}, 5–7, [10–8]
2024	(Canada) Gabriela Dabrowski (New Zealand) Erin Routliffe	(United Kingdom) Harriet Dart (France) Diane Parry	5–7, 6–3, [11–9]
2025	(Brazil) Beatriz Haddad Maia (2) (Germany) Laura Siegemund	(Kazakhstan) Anna Danilina (Japan) Ena Shibahara	6–3, 6–2
2026	(United Kingdom) Harriet Dart (United Kingdom) Maia Lumsden	(Japan) Shuko Aoyama (Chinese Taipei) Chan Hao-ching	6–3, 6–4

Source: LTA
