= 2018 Nottingham Open – Men's doubles =

Men's doubles
- 2018 Nottingham Open

Final
- Champions: (Denmark) Frederik Nielsen (United Kingdom) Joe Salisbury
- Runners-up: (United States) Austin Krajicek (India) Jeevan Nedunchezhiyan
- Score: 7–6^{(7–5)}, 6–1

Events
Singles	men	women
Doubles	men	women
← 2017 ·	Nottingham Open	· 2019 →

Ken and Neal Skupski were the defending champions but lost in the semifinals to Frederik Nielsen and Joe Salisbury.

Nielsen and Salisbury won the title after defeating Austin Krajicek and Jeevan Nedunchezhiyan 7–6^{(7–5)}, 6–1 in the final.

== Seeds ==
1. (United Kingdom) Ken Skupski / (United Kingdom) Neal Skupski (semifinals)
2. (Australia) Matt Reid / (Canada) Adil Shamasdin (semifinals, withdrew)
3. (United Kingdom) Luke Bambridge / (United Kingdom) Jonny O'Mara (first round)
4. (United States) Austin Krajicek / (India) Jeevan Nedunchezhiyan (final)

== Draw ==
=== Key ===
- Q = Qualifier
- WC = Wild card
- LL = Lucky loser
- Alt = Alternate
- SE = Special exempt
- PR = Protected ranking
- ITF = ITF entry
- JE = Junior exempt
- w/o = Walkover
- r = Retired
- d = Defaulted
- SR = Special ranking

First round
1	(United Kingdom) K Skupski (United Kingdom) N Skupski	6	6
(Chinese Taipei) J Jung (United States) E King	3	3
(Germany) M Moraing (Canada) P Polansky	7^{7}	7^{7}
WC	(United Kingdom) J Clarke (United Kingdom) M Willis	6^{4}	6^{5}
3	(United Kingdom) L Bambridge (United Kingdom) J O'Mara	4	0
(Denmark) F Nielsen (United Kingdom) J Salisbury	6	6
PR	(Israel) J Erlich (Austria) J Melzer	3	6	[10]
(Kazakhstan) A Bublik (United States) M Mmoh	6	4	[1]
WC	(United Kingdom) L Broady (United Kingdom) S Clayton	4	5
(Spain) A Menéndez Maceiras (Ukraine) S Stakhovsky	6	7
(United Kingdom) B Klein (India) R Ramanathan	6	1	[8]
4	(United States) A Krajicek (India) J Nedunchezhiyan	3	6	[10]
(Spain) M Granollers (Belarus) I Ivashka	7	6
WC	(United Kingdom) A McHugh (United Kingdom) C Norrie	5	4
(Italy) T Fabbiano (Australia) M Polmans	5	4
2	(Australia) M Reid (Canada) A Shamasdin	7	6

Quarterfinals
1	(United Kingdom) K Skupski (United Kingdom) N Skupski	6	6
(Germany) M Moraing (Canada) P Polansky	3	4
(Denmark) F Nielsen (United Kingdom) J Salisbury	6	5	[10]
PR	(Israel) J Erlich (Austria) J Melzer	4	7	[4]
(Spain) A Menéndez Maceiras (Ukraine) S Stakhovsky	5	4
4	(United States) A Krajicek (India) J Nedunchezhiyan	7	6
(Spain) M Granollers (Belarus) I Ivashka	3	4
2	(Australia) M Reid (Canada) A Shamasdin	6	6

Semifinals
1	(United Kingdom) K Skupski (United Kingdom) N Skupski	6	6^{4}	[13]
(Denmark) F Nielsen (United Kingdom) J Salisbury	2	7^{7}	[15]
4	(United States) A Krajicek (India) J Nedunchezhiyan	w/o
2	(Australia) M Reid (Canada) A Shamasdin

Final
(Denmark) F Nielsen (United Kingdom) J Salisbury	7^{7}	6
4	(United States) A Krajicek (India) J Nedunchezhiyan	6^{5}	1
