= 2019 Nottingham Open – Women's singles =

Women's singles
- 2019 Nottingham Open

Final
- Champion: (France) Caroline Garcia
- Runner-up: (Croatia) Donna Vekić
- Score: 2–6, 7–6^{(7–4)}, 7–6^{(7–4)}

Details
- Draw: 32 (6 Q / 3 WC )
- Seeds: 8

Events
Singles	men	women
Doubles	men	women
← 2018 ·	Nottingham Open	· 2021 →

Ashleigh Barty was the defending champion, but withdrew before the tournament began.

Caroline Garcia won the title, defeating Donna Vekić in the final, 2–6, 7–6^{(7–4)}, 7–6^{(7–4)}.

The first two rounds, two quarterfinal matches, and part of a third quarterfinal were played on indoor hard courts after rain persisted through the first four days (and part of the fifth and sixth days) of the tournament.

== Seeds ==
1. (France) Caroline Garcia (champion)
2. (Croatia) Donna Vekić (final)
3. (Kazakhstan) Yulia Putintseva (withdrew)
4. (Greece) Maria Sakkari (quarterfinals)
5. (Ukraine) Dayana Yastremska (withdrew)
6. (Australia) Ajla Tomljanović (quarterfinals)
7. (China) Zhang Shuai (first round)
8. (France) Kristina Mladenovic (quarterfinals)
9. (Germany) Tatjana Maria (semifinals)
10. (Russia) Evgeniya Rodina (first round)

== Draw ==
=== Key ===
- Q = Qualifier
- WC = Wild card
- LL = Lucky loser
- Alt = Alternate
- SE = Special exempt
- PR = Protected ranking
- ITF = ITF entry
- JE = Junior exempt
- w/o = Walkover
- r = Retired
- d = Defaulted
- SR = Special ranking

=== Finals ===
Semifinals
1	(France) Caroline Garcia	4	6	6
(United States) Jennifer Brady	6	3	3
9	(Germany) Tatjana Maria	7	0	0
2	(Croatia) Donna Vekić	5	6	6

Final
1	(France) Caroline Garcia	2	7^{7}	7^{7}
2	(Croatia) Donna Vekić	6	6^{4}	6^{4}

=== Top half ===
First round
1	(France) C Garcia	6	6
WC	(United Kingdom) N Bains	1	2
Q	(United Kingdom) T Moore	3	6^{3}
WC	(United Kingdom) M Lumsden	6	7^{7}
Q	(Russia) L Samsonova	1	7^{7}	3
(Switzerland) V Golubic	6	6^{2}	6
Q	(Romania) E-G Ruse	6	6
10	(Russia) E Rodina	3	3
4	(Greece) M Sakkari	6	6
(United Kingdom) H Watson	4	3
(Serbia) I Jorović	6	6
Q	(Australia) E Perez	3	4
(Spain) S Sorribes Tormo	6	5	7^{7}
PR	(United States) S Rogers	4	7	6^{4}
(United States) J Brady	7	6
7	(China) S Zhang	5	3

Second round
1	(France) C Garcia	6	6
WC	(United Kingdom) M Lumsden	3	1
(Switzerland) V Golubic	6^{3}	6	4
Q	(Romania) E-G Ruse	7^{7}	4	6
4	(Greece) M Sakkari	6	6
(Serbia) I Jorović	2	4
(Spain) S Sorribes Tormo	4	6	5
(United States) J Brady	6	3	7

Quarterfinals
1	(France) C Garcia	4	7^{7}	6
Q	(Romania) E-G Ruse	6	6^{3}	1
4	(Greece) M Sakkari	5	3
(United States) J Brady	7	6

Semifinals
1	(France) C Garcia	4	6	6
(United States) J Brady	6	3	3

=== Bottom half ===
First round
6	(Australia) A Tomljanović	6	6
Q	(United States) D Lao	2	3
(United Kingdom) H Dart	7^{9}	3	6
(Belarus) V Lapko	6^{7}	6	3
(United States) B Pera	7^{7}	6
WC	(United Kingdom) K Swan	6^{5}	1
(Romania) M Niculescu	1	6	6^{3}
9	(Germany) T Maria	6	3	7^{7}
8	(France) K Mladenovic	7	6
Q	(Poland) M Fręch	5	2
(Australia) A Sharma	6	0
(Slovakia) M Rybáriková	1	0^{r}
LL	(France) C Paquet	5	6	6
LL	(India) A Raina	7	4	2
(Slovenia) D Jakupović	2	7^{7}	0
2	(Croatia) D Vekić	6	6^{5}	6

Second round
6	(Australia) A Tomljanović	6^{5}	6	6
(United Kingdom) H Dart	7^{7}	1	2
(United States) B Pera	7	6^{5}	3
9	(Germany) T Maria	5	7^{7}	6
8	(France) K Mladenovic	6	7
(Australia) A Sharma	1	5
LL	(France) C Paquet	1	2
2	(Croatia) D Vekić	6	6

Quarterfinals
6	(Australia) A Tomljanović	3	6^{7}
9	(Germany) T Maria	6	7^{9}
8	(France) K Mladenovic	5	4
2	(Croatia) D Vekić	7	6

Semifinals
9	(Germany) T Maria	7	0	0
2	(Croatia) D Vekić	5	6	6

== Qualifying ==
=== Seeds ===
1. (Belgium) Yanina Wickmayer (withdrew)
2. (Czech Republic) Tereza Martincová (first round)
3. (Australia) Kimberly Birrell (first round)
4. (Russia) Liudmila Samsonova (qualified)
5. (Poland) Magdalena Fręch (qualified)
6. (United States) Danielle Lao (qualified)
7. (Italy) Giulia Gatto-Monticone (qualifying competition, retired)
8. (India) Ankita Raina (qualifying competition, lucky loser)
9. (Paraguay) Verónica Cepede Royg (qualifying competition)
10. (Slovakia) Jana Čepelová (first round)
11. (France) Jessika Ponchet (qualifying competition)
12. (Russia) Valeria Savinykh (qualifying competition)

=== Qualifiers ===
1. (Romania) Elena-Gabriela Ruse
2. (United Kingdom) Tara Moore
3. (Australia) Ellen Perez
4. (Russia) Liudmila Samsonova
5. (Poland) Magdalena Fręch
6. (United States) Danielle Lao

=== Lucky losers ===
1. (France) Chloé Paquet
2. (India) Ankita Raina

=== Draw ===
==== First qualifier ====
First round
Alt	(France) Chloé Paquet	6	7^{7}
(Georgia (country)) Mariam Bolkvadze	0	6^{1}
(Romania) Elena-Gabriela Ruse	6	7^{7}
10	(Slovakia) Jana Čepelová	4	6^{4}

Qualifying competition
Alt	(France) Chloé Paquet	3	3
(Romania) Elena-Gabriela Ruse	6	6

==== Second qualifier ====
First round
2	(Czech Republic) Tereza Martincová	4	2
WC	(United Kingdom) Tara Moore	6	6
(China) Xu Shilin	3	3
7	(Italy) Giulia Gatto-Monticone	6	6

Qualifying competition
WC	(United Kingdom) Tara Moore	5
7	(Italy) Giulia Gatto-Monticone	4^{r}

==== Third qualifier ====
First round
3	(Australia) Kimberly Birrell	3	3
(Australia) Ellen Perez	6	6
(China) Zhang Kailin	3	0^{r}
8	(India) Ankita Raina	6	0

Qualifying competition
(Australia) Ellen Perez	6	3	6
8	(India) Ankita Raina	1	6	3

==== Fourth qualifier ====
First round
4	(Russia) Liudmila Samsonova	6	6
(China) Ma Shuyue	4	4
WC	(United Kingdom) Freya Christie	6	3	4
12	(Russia) Valeria Savinykh	3	6	6

Qualifying competition
4	(Russia) Liudmila Samsonova	6	6
12	(Russia) Valeria Savinykh	4	1

==== Fifth qualifier ====
First round
5	(Poland) Magdalena Fręch	6	6
WC	(United Kingdom) Eden Silva	4	2
(United States) Caroline Dolehide	4	3
9	(Paraguay) Verónica Cepede Royg	6	6

Qualifying competition
5	(Poland) Magdalena Fręch	6	6
9	(Paraguay) Verónica Cepede Royg	2	1

==== Sixth qualifier ====
First round
6	(United States) Danielle Lao	7^{7}	6
WC	(United Kingdom) Sarah Beth Grey	6^{4}	2
(Australia) Kaylah McPhee	7^{7}	6^{2}	1
11	(France) Jessika Ponchet	6^{5}	7^{7}	6

Qualifying competition
6	(United States) Danielle Lao	4	7^{9}	6
11	(France) Jessika Ponchet	6	6^{7}	3
