= 2022 Nottingham Open – Women's doubles =

Women's doubles
- 2022 Nottingham Open

Final
- Champions: (Brazil) Beatriz Haddad Maia (China) Zhang Shuai
- Runners-up: (United States) Caroline Dolehide (Romania) Monica Niculescu
- Score: 7–6^{(7–2)}, 6–3

Events
Singles	men	women
Doubles	men	women
← 2021 ·	Nottingham Open	· 2023 →

Beatriz Haddad Maia and Zhang Shuai defeated Caroline Dolehide and Monica Niculescu in the final, 7–6^{(7–2)}, 6–3 to win the women's doubles tennis title at the 2022 Nottingham Open. Haddad Maia also won the singles event.

Lyudmyla Kichenok and Makoto Ninomiya were the defending champions, but neither returned to compete after Kichenok chose not to participate and Ninomiya competed in 's-Hertogenbosch instead.

== Seeds ==
1. (Brazil) Beatriz Haddad Maia / (China) Zhang Shuai (champions)
2. (United States) Asia Muhammad / (Japan) Ena Shibahara (quarterfinals)
3. (Japan) Shuko Aoyama / (Chinese Taipei) Chan Hao-ching (semifinals)
4. (United States) Caroline Dolehide / (Romania) Monica Niculescu (final)

== Draw ==
=== Key ===
- Q = Qualifier
- WC = Wild card
- LL = Lucky loser
- Alt = Alternate
- SE = Special exempt
- PR = Protected ranking
- ITF = ITF entry
- JE = Junior exempt
- w/o = Walkover
- r = Retired
- d = Defaulted
- SR = Special ranking

=== Draw ===
First round
1	(Brazil) B Haddad Maia (China) S Zhang	6	6
(Switzerland) V Golubic (Colombia) C Osorio	2	3
(Chinese Taipei) L Chan (Australia) S Stosur	6	6
(Greece) M Sakkari (Croatia) D Vekić	3	3
3	(Japan) S Aoyama (Chinese Taipei) H-c Chan	6	7
(Poland) A Rosolska (New Zealand) E Routliffe	1	5
(Poland) K Kawa (Indonesia) A Sutjiadi	3	7	[10]
(United Kingdom) A Barnett (United Kingdom) O Nicholls	6	5	[4]
(Poland) M Fręch (Czech Republic) T Martincová	4	4
(United States) I Neel (Australia) A Sharma	6	6
(Ukraine) N Kichenok (Australia) Ar Rodionova	1	1
4	(United States) C Dolehide (Romania) M Niculescu	6	6
(Germany) V Heisen (United Kingdom) S Murray Sharan	7	4	[10]
Alt	(Spain) C Bucșa (Australia) M Inglis	5	6	[6]
(United States) C Harrison (United States) S Santamaria	3	6	[3]
2	(United States) A Muhammad (Japan) E Shibahara	6	3	[10]

Quarterfinals
1	(Brazil) B Haddad Maia (China) S Zhang	6	6^{6}	[10]
(Chinese Taipei) L Chan (Australia) S Stosur	1	7^{8}	[6]
3	(Japan) S Aoyama (Chinese Taipei) H-c Chan	6^{4}	6	[11]
(Poland) K Kawa (Indonesia) A Sutjiadi	7^{7}	2	[9]
(United States) I Neel (Australia) A Sharma	1	6	[5]
4	(United States) C Dolehide (Romania) M Niculescu	6	2	[10]
(Germany) V Heisen (United Kingdom) S Murray Sharan	3	7^{8}	[12]
2	(United States) A Muhammad (Japan) E Shibahara	6	6^{6}	[10]

Semifinals
1	(Brazil) B Haddad Maia (China) S Zhang	6	6
3	(Japan) S Aoyama (Chinese Taipei) H-c Chan	4	4
4	(United States) C Dolehide (Romania) M Niculescu	4	6	[10]
(Germany) V Heisen (United Kingdom) S Murray Sharan	6	3	[3]

Final
1	(Brazil) B Haddad Maia (China) S Zhang	7^{7}	6
4	(United States) C Dolehide (Romania) M Niculescu	6^{2}	3
