= 2018 Nottingham Open – Men's singles =

Men's singles
- 2018 Nottingham Open

Final
- Champion: (Australia) Alex de Minaur
- Runner-up: (United Kingdom) Dan Evans
- Score: 7–6^{(7–4)}, 7–5

Details
- Draw: 32
- Seeds: 8

Events
Singles	men	women
Doubles	men	women
- Nottingham Open

Dudi Sela was the defending champion but chose not to defend his title.

Alex de Minaur won the title after defeating Dan Evans 7–6^{(7–4)}, 7–5 in the final.

== Seeds ==
1. (United Kingdom) Cameron Norrie (first round)
2. (Australia) Alex de Minaur (champion)
3. (Italy) Thomas Fabbiano (first round)
4. (Belarus) Ilya Ivashka (semifinals)
5. (India) Ramkumar Ramanathan (quarterfinals)
6. (Canada) Peter Polansky (quarterfinals)
7. (Ukraine) Sergiy Stakhovsky (second round)
8. (United States) Michael Mmoh (first round)

== Draw ==
Key

- Q = Qualifier
- WC = Wild card
- LL = Lucky loser
- Alt = Alternate
- ITF = ITF entry
- PR = Protected ranking
- SR = Special ranking
- SE = Special exempt
- JE = Junior exempt
- JR = Junior Accelerator Programme entrant
- CO = College Accelerator Programme entrant
- NG = Next Gen Accelerator Program entrant
- w/o = Walkover
- r = Retired
- d = Defaulted

=== Finals ===
Semifinals
SE	(United Kingdom) Dan Evans	4	6	6
(Spain) Marcel Granollers	6	2	3
4	(Belarus) Ilya Ivashka	2	4
2/SE	(Australia) Alex de Minaur	6	6

Final
SE	(United Kingdom) Dan Evans	6^{4}	5
2/SE	(Australia) Alex de Minaur	7^{7}	7

=== Top half ===
First round
1	(United Kingdom) C Norrie	6	5	3
(Japan) T Ito	1	7	6
Q	(Canada) B Schnur	6	6
(Canada) F Peliwo	3	2
LL	(Germany) D Köpfer	3	5
SE	(United Kingdom) D Evans	6	7
(Germany) M Moraing	3	5
7	(Ukraine) S Stakhovsky	6	7
3	(Italy) T Fabbiano	5	6^{3}
(Spain) M Granollers	7	7^{7}
(United Kingdom) L Broady	6	4	6^{7}
WC	(United Kingdom) A Ward	2	6	7^{9}
Q	(Germany) T Kamke	6	6
WC	(United Kingdom) J Clarke	3	3
(Chinese Taipei) J Jung	7^{7}	5	4
5	(India) R Ramanathan	6^{4}	7	6

Second round
(Japan) T Ito	3	6	6^{5}
Q	(Canada) B Schnur	6	3	7^{7}
SE	(United Kingdom) D Evans	7	7^{7}
7	(Ukraine) S Stakhovsky	5	6^{2}
(Spain) M Granollers	6	6
WC	(United Kingdom) A Ward	4	3
Q	(Germany) T Kamke	6^{1}	3
5	(India) R Ramanathan	7^{7}	6

Quarterfinals
Q	(Canada) B Schnur	6^{5}	3
SE	(United Kingdom) D Evans	7^{7}	6
(Spain) M Granollers	7^{7}	4	7^{7}
5	(India) R Ramanathan	6^{5}	6	6^{4}

Semifinals
SE	(United Kingdom) D Evans	4	6	6
(Spain) M Granollers	6	2	3

=== Bottom half ===
First round
8	(United States) M Mmoh	4	4
(Australia) M Polmans	6	6
WC	(United Kingdom) J Ward	6	6^{5}	7^{7}
Q	(Germany) Tobias Simon	4	7^{7}	6^{1}
(Spain) A Menéndez Maceiras	6	7^{10}
Q	(Denmark) F Nielsen	4	6^{8}
(Australia) J Kubler	6	6^{4}	4
4	(Belarus) I Ivashka	1	7^{7}	6
6	(Canada) P Polansky	3	6	6
WC	(United Kingdom) G Loffhagen	6	1	3
(Kazakhstan) A Bublik	6^{7}	3
(France) S Robert	7^{9}	6
(United States) S Kozlov	3	3
LL	(United States) C Eubanks	6	6
PR	(Austria) J Melzer	4	1
2/SE	(Australia) A de Minaur	6	6

Second round
(Australia) M Polmans	6	6^{5}	4
WC	(United Kingdom) J Ward	3	7^{7}	6
(Spain) A Menéndez Maceiras	6	3	4
4	(Belarus) I Ivashka	4	6	6
6	(Canada) P Polansky	6	6
(France) S Robert	3	4
LL	(United States) C Eubanks	4	4
2/SE	(Australia) A de Minaur	6	6

Quarterfinals
WC	(United Kingdom) J Ward	4	3
4	(Belarus) I Ivashka	6	6
6	(Canada) P Polansky	3	6	2
2/SE	(Australia) A de Minaur	6	3	6

Semifinals
4	(Belarus) I Ivashka	2	4
2/SE	(Australia) A de Minaur	6	6
