= 2017 Nottingham Open – Women's singles =

Women's singles
- 2017 Nottingham Open

Final
- Champion: (Croatia) Donna Vekić
- Runner-up: (United Kingdom) Johanna Konta
- Score: 2–6, 7–6^{(7–3)}, 7–5

Events
Singles	men	women
Doubles	men	women
← 2016 ·	Nottingham Open	· 2018 →

Karolína Plíšková was the defending champion, but chose not to participate this year.

Donna Vekić won the title, defeating Johanna Konta in the final, 2–6, 7–6^{(7–3)}, 7–5.

== Seeds ==
1. (United Kingdom) Johanna Konta (final)
2. (Latvia) Anastasija Sevastova (first round)
3. (United States) Lauren Davis (first round)
4. (United States) Alison Riske (second round)
5. (Czech Republic) Lucie Šafářová (semifinals)
6. (United States) Shelby Rogers (first round)
7. (Germany) Mona Barthel (first round)
8. (Japan) Naomi Osaka (first round)

== Draw ==
=== Key ===
- Q = Qualifier
- WC = Wild card
- LL = Lucky loser
- Alt = Alternate
- ITF = ITF entry
- PR = Protected ranking
- SR = Special ranking
- SE = Special exempt
- JE = Junior exempt
- JR = Junior Accelerator Programme entrant
- CO = College Accelerator Programme entrant
- NG = Next Gen Accelerator Program entrant
- w/o = Walkover
- r = Retired
- d = Defaulted

=== Finals ===
Semifinals
1	(United Kingdom) Johanna Konta	6	7
PR	(Slovakia) Magdaléna Rybáriková	2	5
5	(Czech Republic) Lucie Šafářová	6^{5}	6	6^{4}
(Croatia) Donna Vekić	7^{7}	3	7^{7}

Final
1	(United Kingdom) Johanna Konta	6	6^{3}	5
(Croatia) Donna Vekić	2	7^{7}	7

=== Top half ===
First round
1	(United Kingdom) J Konta	6	3
WC	(United Kingdom) T Moore	2	0^{r}
(Belgium) Y Wickmayer	6	6
Q	(Russia) E Kulichkova	4	4
(Australia) A Barty	4	6	6
(Germany) T Maria	6	3	0
Q	(Croatia) J Fett	6	5	7
7	(Germany) M Barthel	3	7	5
4	(United States) A Riske	6	6
WC	(United Kingdom) H Watson	2	3
Q	(Ukraine) D Yastremska	1	2
PR	(Slovakia) M Rybáriková	6	6
(France) O Dodin	4	6^{5}
(Poland) M Linette	6	7^{7}
Q	(United States) K Ahn	6	6
8	(Japan) N Osaka	1	1

Second round
1	(United Kingdom) J Konta	6	6
(Belgium) Y Wickmayer	4	1
(Australia) A Barty	6	6
Q	(Croatia) J Fett	2	1
4	(United States) A Riske	2	7^{7}	5
PR	(Slovakia) M Rybáriková	6	6^{5}	7
(Poland) M Linette	3	1
Q	(United States) K Ahn	6	6

Quarterfinals
1	(United Kingdom) J Konta	6	7
(Australia) A Barty	3	5
PR	(Slovakia) M Rybáriková	6	6
Q	(United States) K Ahn	4	1

Semifinals
1	(United Kingdom) J Konta	6	7
PR	(Slovakia) M Rybáriková	2	5

=== Bottom half ===
First round
5	(Czech Republic) L Šafářová	6	6^{5}	6
Q	(United States) G Min	3	7^{7}	2
(Chinese Taipei) S-w Hsieh	6	6
(Slovakia) K Kučová	1	4
Q	(Czech Republic) T Martincová	2	2
(Bulgaria) T Pironkova	6	6
(Japan) K Nara	6	6
3	(United States) L Davis	3	3
6	(United States) S Rogers	4	3
(Croatia) D Vekić	6	6
WC	(United Kingdom) L Robson	4	3
(United States) J Boserup	6	6
(Greece) M Sakkari	7^{7}	5	7^{8}
(Slovakia) J Čepelová	6^{3}	7	6^{6}
(United States) C McHale	6	5	7^{7}
2	(Latvia) A Sevastova	0	7	6^{2}

Second round
5	(Czech Republic) L Šafářová	1	6	7^{9}
(Chinese Taipei) S-w Hsieh	6	3	6^{7}
(Bulgaria) T Pironkova	6	6
(Japan) K Nara	3	2
(Croatia) D Vekić	6	6
(United States) J Boserup	3	4
(Greece) M Sakkari	1	7^{7}	7
(United States) C McHale	6	6^{3}	5

Quarterfinals
5	(Czech Republic) L Šafářová	6	0	6
(Bulgaria) T Pironkova	3	6	4
(Croatia) D Vekić	6	6
(Greece) M Sakkari	2	3

Semifinals
5	(Czech Republic) L Šafářová	6^{5}	6	6^{4}
(Croatia) D Vekić	7^{7}	3	7^{7}

== Qualifying ==
=== Seeds ===
1. (United States) Sachia Vickery (qualifying competition)
2. (United States) Kristie Ahn (qualified)
3. (Czech Republic) Tereza Martincová (qualified)
4. (Russia) Elizaveta Kulichkova (qualified)
5. (Bulgaria) Isabella Shinikova (first round)
6. (Australia) Lizette Cabrera (qualifying competition)
7. (Australia) Destanee Aiava (qualifying competition)
8. (United States) Grace Min (qualified)
9. (Croatia) Jana Fett (qualified)
10. (Slovakia) Magdaléna Rybáriková (moved to main draw)
11. (Portugal) Michelle Larcher de Brito (first round)
12. (Israel) Deniz Khazaniuk (first round)
13. (United States) Caroline Dolehide (qualifying competition)

=== Qualifiers ===
1. (Croatia) Jana Fett
2. (United States) Kristie Ahn
3. (Czech Republic) Tereza Martincová
4. (Russia) Elizaveta Kulichkova
5. (Ukraine) Dayana Yastremska
6. (United States) Grace Min

=== Draw ===
==== First qualifier ====
First round
1	(United States) Sachia Vickery	6	7
(United States) Brianna Morgan	2	5
(United States) Alexa Glatch	3	4
9	(Croatia) Jana Fett	6	6

Qualifying competition
1	(United States) Sachia Vickery	4	3
9	(Croatia) Jana Fett	6	6

==== Second qualifier ====
First round
2	(United States) Kristie Ahn	6	6
(Canada) Gabriela Dabrowski	3	4
WC	(United Kingdom) Laura Deigman	3	4
7	(Australia) Destanee Aiava	6	6

Qualifying competition
2	(United States) Kristie Ahn	7	6
7	(Australia) Destanee Aiava	5	2

==== Third qualifier ====
First round
3	(Czech Republic) Tereza Martincová	6	6
WC	(United Kingdom) Freya Christie	3	3
WC	(United Kingdom) Eden Silva	6	3	6
12	(Israel) Deniz Khazaniuk	3	6	1

Qualifying competition
3	(Czech Republic) Tereza Martincová	6	6
WC	(United Kingdom) Eden Silva	2	3

==== Fourth qualifier ====
First round				Qualifying competition
				4	(Russia) Elizaveta Kulichkova	6^{5}	6	6
				13	(United States) Caroline Dolehide	7^{7}	3	4
	(United States) Alexandra Stevenson	3	4	13	(United States) Caroline Dolehide	7^{7}	3	4
13	(United States) Caroline Dolehide	6	6

==== Fifth qualifier ====
First round
5	(Bulgaria) Isabella Shinikova	5	6^{6}
WC	(United States) Ashley Weinhold	7	7^{8}
(Ukraine) Dayana Yastremska	6	6
11	(Portugal) Michelle Larcher de Brito	3	1

Qualifying competition
WC	(United States) Ashley Weinhold	6	2	2
(Ukraine) Dayana Yastremska	3	6	6

==== Sixth qualifier ====
First round
6	(Australia) Lizette Cabrera	6	6
(United States) Caitlin Whoriskey	2	1
(Croatia) Darija Jurak	1	3
8	(United States) Grace Min	6	6

Qualifying competition
6	(Australia) Lizette Cabrera	7	4	4
8	(United States) Grace Min	5	6	6
