= 2022 Nottingham Open – Men's doubles =

Men's doubles
- 2022 Nottingham Open

Final
- Champions: (United Kingdom) Jonny O'Mara (United Kingdom) Ken Skupski
- Runners-up: (United Kingdom) Julian Cash (United Kingdom) Henry Patten
- Score: 3–6, 6–2, [16–14]

Events
Singles	men	women
Doubles	men	women
← 2021 ·	Nottingham Open	· 2023 →

Defending champion Ken Skupski and his partner, Jonny O'Mara, defeated Julian Cash and Henry Patten in the final, 3–6, 6–2, [16–14], to win the men's doubles tennis title at the 2022 Nottingham Open. The third seeds saved three championship points en route to the title.

Skupski had won the title in 2021 with Matt Reid, but Reid did not return to compete.

== Seeds ==
1. (Italy) Andrea Vavassori / (Poland) Szymon Walków (first round)
2. (India) Ramkumar Ramanathan / (Australia) John-Patrick Smith (quarterfinals)
3. (United Kingdom) Jonny O'Mara / (United Kingdom) Ken Skupski (champions)
4. (United States) William Blumberg / (Philippines) Treat Huey (semifinals)

== Draw ==
=== Key ===
- Q = Qualifier
- WC = Wild card
- LL = Lucky loser
- Alt = Alternate
- SE = Special exempt
- PR = Protected ranking
- ITF = ITF entry
- JE = Junior exempt
- w/o = Walkover
- r = Retired
- d = Defaulted
- SR = Special ranking

First round
1	(Italy) A Vavassori (Poland) S Walków	4	6	[11]
(Kazakhstan) M Kukushkin (Australia) J Millman	6	1	[13]
(United Kingdom) J Cash (United Kingdom) H Patten	6	6
(United States) N Monroe (Australia) A Popyrin	3	3
4	(United States) W Blumberg (Philippines) T Huey	6	3	[10]
(United Kingdom) L Broady (United Kingdom) J Clarke	4	6	[2]
WC	(United Kingdom) C Broom (United Kingdom) A McHugh	3	2
(United Kingdom) A Gray (United Kingdom) R Peniston	6	6
(India) D Sharan (New Zealand) A Sitak	6	4	[10]
(United States) J Cerretani (India) P Raja	4	6	[6]
(France) G Blancaneaux (France) A Hoang	7	2	[4]
3	(United Kingdom) J O'Mara (United Kingdom) K Skupski	5	6	[10]
WC	(United Kingdom) A Fery (United Kingdom) F Gill	3	6	[13]
(France) T Arribagé (France) E Couacaud	6	1	[11]
(France) L Pouille (United States) J Sock	7^{7}	6^{4}	[6]
2	(India) R Ramanathan (Australia) J-P Smith	6^{3}	7^{7}	[10]

Quarterfinals
(Kazakhstan) M Kukushkin (Australia) J Millman	3	2
(United Kingdom) J Cash (United Kingdom) H Patten	6	6
4	(United States) W Blumberg (Philippines) T Huey	3	7^{7}	[10]
(United Kingdom) A Gray (United Kingdom) R Peniston	6	6^{4}	[5]
(India) D Sharan (New Zealand) A Sitak	4	3
3	(United Kingdom) J O'Mara (United Kingdom) K Skupski	6	6
WC	(United Kingdom) A Fery (United Kingdom) F Gill	6	7
2	(India) R Ramanathan (Australia) J-P Smith	4	5

Semifinals
(United Kingdom) J Cash (United Kingdom) H Patten	7^{7}	6
4	(United States) W Blumberg (Philippines) T Huey	6^{5}	3
3	(United Kingdom) J O'Mara (United Kingdom) K Skupski	6	6
WC	(United Kingdom) A Fery (United Kingdom) F Gill	4	3

Final
(United Kingdom) J Cash (United Kingdom) H Patten	6	2	[14]
3	(United Kingdom) J O'Mara (United Kingdom) K Skupski	3	6	[16]
