= 2017 Nottingham Open =

- Date: 12–18 June
- Edition: 10th (women); 1st (men)
- Category: WTA International (women); ATP Challenger Tour (men)
- Draw: 32S / 16D
- Surface: Grass
- Location: Nottingham, United Kingdom
- Venue: Nottingham Tennis Centre

Champions

Men's singles
- (Israel) Dudi Sela

Women's singles
- (Croatia) Donna Vekić

Men's doubles
- (United Kingdom) Ken Skupski / (United Kingdom) Neal Skupski

Women's doubles
- (Australia) Monique Adamczak / (Australia) Storm Sanders
| ← 2016 · | Nottingham Open | · 2018 → |

The 2017 Nottingham Open (known for sponsorship reasons as the Aegon Open Nottingham) was a professional tennis tournament played on outdoor grass courts. It was the 10th edition of the event for women and the 22nd edition for men, with the men's event being downgraded from an ATP World Tour 250 series event to an ATP Challenger Tour event in 2017. It was classified as a WTA International tournament on the 2017 WTA Tour. The event took place at the Nottingham Tennis Centre in Nottingham, United Kingdom from 12 June through 18 June 2017.

== ATP challenger singles main-draw entrants ==
=== Seeds ===
| Country | Player | Rank^{1} | Seed |
|---|---|---|---|
| ~~GBR~~ | ~~Dan Evans~~ | ~~55~~ | ~~1~~ |
| ROU | Marius Copil | 94 | 2 |
| ISR | Dudi Sela | 100 | 3 |
| ITA | Thomas Fabbiano | 103 | 4 |
| JPN | Go Soeda | 111 | 5 |
| BAR | Darian King | 116 | 6 |
| ITA | Luca Vanni | 121 | 7 |
| UKR | Illya Marchenko | 122 | 8 |

- ^{1} Rankings are as of 29 May 2017.

=== Other entrants ===
The following players received wildcards into the main draw:

- (United Kingdom) Liam Broady
- (United Kingdom) Jay Clarke
- (United Kingdom) Brydan Klein
- (United Kingdom) Cameron Norrie

The following player received entry into the singles main draw using a protected ranking:

- (India) Yuki Bhambri

The following players received entry from the qualifying draw:

- (Lithuania) Ričardas Berankis
- (United Kingdom) Lloyd Glasspool
- (Australia) Sam Groth
- (Australia) John-Patrick Smith

The following player received entry as a lucky loser:

- (Australia) Alex De Minaur

== ATP challenger doubles main-draw entrants ==
=== Seeds ===
| Country | Player | Country | Player | Rank^{1} | Seed |
|---|---|---|---|---|---|
| AUT | Julian Knowle | AUT | Philipp Oswald | 153 | 1 |
| AUS | Matt Reid | AUS | John-Patrick Smith | 155 | 2 |
| AUS | Marc Polmans | AUS | Andrew Whittington | 165 | 3 |
| THA | Sanchai Ratiwatana | THA | Sonchat Ratiwatana | 185 | 4 |

- ^{1} Rankings are as of 29 May 2017.

=== Other entrants ===
The following pairs received wildcards into the doubles main draw:

- (United Kingdom) Luke Bambridge / (United Kingdom) Cameron Norrie
- (United Kingdom) Scott Clayton / (United Kingdom) Jonny O'Mara
- (United Kingdom) Brydan Klein / (United Kingdom) Joe Salisbury

== WTA singles main-draw entrants ==
=== Seeds ===
| Country | Player | Rank^{1} | Seed |
|---|---|---|---|
| GBR | Johanna Konta | 8 | 1 |
| LAT | Anastasija Sevastova | 19 | 2 |
| USA | Lauren Davis | 26 | 3 |
| USA | Alison Riske | 37 | 4 |
| CZE | Lucie Šafářová | 39 | 5 |
| USA | Shelby Rogers | 49 | 6 |
| GER | Mona Barthel | 50 | 7 |
| JPN | Naomi Osaka | 55 | 8 |

- ^{1} Rankings are as of 29 May 2017.

=== Other entrants ===
The following players received wildcards into the main draw:

- (United Kingdom) Tara Moore
- (United Kingdom) Laura Robson
- (United Kingdom) Heather Watson

The following player received entry using a protected ranking:

- (Slovakia) Magdaléna Rybáriková

The following players received entry from the qualifying draw:

- (United States) Kristie Ahn
- (Croatia) Jana Fett
- (Russia) Elizaveta Kulichkova
- (Czech Republic) Tereza Martincová
- (United States) Grace Min
- (Ukraine) Dayana Yastremska

=== Withdrawals ===
Before the tournament

- (Russia) Ekaterina Alexandrova →replaced by (Japan) Kurumi Nara
- (Japan) Nao Hibino →replaced by (Chinese Taipei) Hsieh Su-wei
- (Kazakhstan) Yulia Putintseva →replaced by (Slovakia) Magdaléna Rybáriková

=== Retirements ===
- (United Kingdom) Tara Moore (left foot injury)

== WTA doubles main-draw entrants ==
=== Seeds ===
| Country | Player | Country | Player | Rank^{1} | Seed |
|---|---|---|---|---|---|
| CAN | Gabriela Dabrowski | UKR | Olga Savchuk | 66 | 1 |
| CRO | Darija Jurak | AUS | Anastasia Rodionova | 70 | 2 |
| TPE | Chan Hao-ching | AUS | Casey Dellacqua | 87 | 3 |
| USA | Christina McHale | GBR | Heather Watson | 114 | 4 |

- ^{1} Rankings are as of 29 May 2017.

=== Other entrants ===
The following pair received a wildcard into the doubles main draw:

- (United Kingdom) Freya Christie / (United Kingdom) Tara Moore

The following pair received entry as alternates:

- (Chinese Taipei) Hsieh Su-wei / (Poland) Magda Linette

=== Withdrawals ===
Before the tournament

- (United Kingdom) Tara Moore (left foot injury)

== Champions ==
=== Men's singles ===
- (Israel) Dudi Sela def. (Italy) Thomas Fabbiano 4–6, 6–4, 6–3.

=== Women's singles ===
- (Croatia) Donna Vekić def. (United Kingdom) Johanna Konta, 2–6, 7–6^{(7–3)}, 7–5

=== Men's doubles ===
- (United Kingdom) Ken Skupski / (United Kingdom) Neal Skupski def. (Australia) Matt Reid / (Australia) John-Patrick Smith 7–6^{(7–1)}, 2–6, [10–7].

=== Women's doubles ===
- (Australia) Monique Adamczak / (Australia) Storm Sanders def. (United Kingdom) Jocelyn Rae / (United Kingdom) Laura Robson, 6–4, 4–6, [10–4]
