= 2018 Nottingham Open – Women's doubles =

Women's doubles
- 2018 Nottingham Open

Final
- Champions: (Poland) Alicja Rosolska (United States) Abigail Spears
- Runners-up: (Romania) Mihaela Buzărnescu (United Kingdom) Heather Watson
- Score: 6–3, 7–6^{(7–5)}

Events
Singles	men	women
Doubles	men	women
← 2017 ·	Nottingham Open	· 2019 →

Monique Adamczak and Storm Sanders were the defending champions, but both players chose not to participate.

Alicja Rosolska and Abigail Spears won the title, defeating Mihaela Buzărnescu and Heather Watson in the final, 6–3, 7–6^{(7–5)}.

== Seeds ==
1. (Ukraine) Lyudmyla Kichenok / (Russia) Alla Kudryavtseva (first round)
2. (Ukraine) Nadiia Kichenok / (Australia) Anastasia Rodionova (first round)
3. (Poland) Alicja Rosolska / (United States) Abigail Spears (champions)
4. (Chinese Taipei) Chan Hao-ching / (United Kingdom) Laura Robson (first round)

== Draw ==
=== Key ===
- Q = Qualifier
- WC = Wild card
- LL = Lucky loser
- Alt = Alternate
- SE = Special exempt
- PR = Protected ranking
- ITF = ITF entry
- JE = Junior exempt
- w/o = Walkover
- r = Retired
- d = Defaulted
- SR = Special ranking

=== Draw ===
First round
1	(Ukraine) L Kichenok (Russia) A Kudryavtseva	6	2	[4]
(Romania) M Buzărnescu (United Kingdom) H Watson	1	6	[10]
(Australia) P Hon (Slovenia) D Jakupović	5	7	[11]
(Russia) V Savinykh (Russia) Y Sizikova	7	5	[9]
4	(Chinese Taipei) H-c Chan (United Kingdom) L Robson	6^{6}	6^{1}
(Australia) L Cabrera (United States) I Falconi	7^{8}	7^{7}
(Chile) A Guarachi (Bulgaria) A Naydenova	2	3
(Australia) D Gavrilova (Croatia) D Vekić	6	6
(Russia) N Dzalamidze (Kazakhstan) G Voskoboeva	7	6
(Australia) Ar Rodionova (Ukraine) O Savchuk	5	1
WC	(United Kingdom) K Boulter (United Kingdom) K Swan	6	2	[6]
3	(Poland) A Rosolska (United States) A Spears	3	6	[10]
(United Kingdom) J Konta (Belgium) Y Wickmayer	6	3	[6]
(Kazakhstan) Z Diyas (China) S Zheng	4	6	[10]
(United States) D Krawczyk (Mexico) G Olmos	6^{6}	6	[10]
2	(Ukraine) N Kichenok (Australia) An Rodionova	7^{8}	2	[4]

Quarterfinals
(Romania) M Buzărnescu (United Kingdom) H Watson	7^{7}	6
(Australia) P Hon (Slovenia) D Jakupović	6^{2}	3
(Australia) L Cabrera (United States) I Falconi	w/o
(Australia) D Gavrilova (Croatia) D Vekić
(Russia) N Dzalamidze (Kazakhstan) G Voskoboeva	2	4
3	(Poland) A Rosolska (United States) A Spears	6	6
(Kazakhstan) Z Diyas (China) S Zheng
(United States) D Krawczyk (Mexico) G Olmos	w/o

Semifinals
(Romania) M Buzărnescu (United Kingdom) H Watson	7	6
(Australia) L Cabrera (United States) I Falconi	5	1
3	(Poland) A Rosolska (United States) A Spears	7^{7}	6
(United States) D Krawczyk (Mexico) G Olmos	6^{2}	4

Final
(Romania) M Buzărnescu (United Kingdom) H Watson	3	6^{5}
3	(Poland) A Rosolska (United States) A Spears	6	7^{7}
