= 2019 Nottingham Open – Women's doubles =

Women's doubles
- 2019 Nottingham Open

Final
- Champions: (United States) Desirae Krawczyk (Mexico) Giuliana Olmos
- Runners-up: (Australia) Ellen Perez (Australia) Arina Rodionova
- Score: 7–6^{(7–5)}, 7–5

Events
Singles	men	women
Doubles	men	women
← 2018 ·	Nottingham Open	· 2021 →

Alicja Rosolska and Abigail Spears were the defending champions, but Spears chose not to participate this year. Rosolska played alongside Yang Zhaoxuan, but lost in the first round to Alexa Guarachi and Erin Routliffe.

Desirae Krawczyk and Giuliana Olmos won the title, defeating Ellen Perez and Arina Rodionova in the final, 7–6^{(7–5)}, 7–5.

The first round, two quarterfinals and one semifinal were played on indoor hard courts after rain persisted through the first four days (and part of the fifth and sixth days) of the tournament.

== Seeds ==
1. (Canada) Gabriela Dabrowski / (China) Xu Yifan (quarterfinals)
2. (Poland) Alicja Rosolska / (China) Yang Zhaoxuan (first round)
3. (Croatia) Darija Jurak / (Slovenia) Katarina Srebotnik (quarterfinals)
4. (Japan) Makoto Ninomiya / (Czech Republic) Renata Voráčová (first round)

== Draw ==
=== Key ===
- Q = Qualifier
- WC = Wild card
- LL = Lucky loser
- Alt = Alternate
- SE = Special exempt
- PR = Protected ranking
- ITF = ITF entry
- JE = Junior exempt
- w/o = Walkover
- r = Retired
- d = Defaulted
- SR = Special ranking

=== Draw ===
First round
1	(Canada) G Dabrowski (China) Y Xu	6	6
(France) C Garcia (China) S Zhang	2	2
(Australia) E Perez (Australia) Ar Rodionova	6	6
WC	(United Kingdom) N Bains (United Kingdom) F Christie	3	1
3	(Croatia) D Jurak (Slovenia) K Srebotnik	4	6	[10]
(Australia) A Sharma (United States) E Shibahara	6	3	[7]
(Georgia (country)) O Kalashnikova (Russia) E Rodina	4	1
(Switzerland) X Knoll (Belarus) V Lapko	6	6
(Sweden) C Lister (United States) S Santamaria	6	5	[3]
WC	(United Kingdom) SB Grey (United Kingdom) E Silva	4	7	[10]
(United States) D Krawczyk (Mexico) G Olmos	6	6
4	(Japan) M Ninomiya (Czech Republic) R Voráčová	3	4
(Romania) M Niculescu (Romania) E-G Ruse	6	5	[10]
(Canada) S Fichman (Japan) M Kato	3	7	[8]
(Chile) A Guarachi (New Zealand) E Routliffe	7	7^{7}
2	(Poland) A Rosolska (China) Z Yang	5	6^{5}

Quarterfinals
1	(Canada) G Dabrowski (China) Y Xu	3	3
(Australia) E Perez (Australia) Ar Rodionova	6	6
3	(Croatia) D Jurak (Slovenia) K Srebotnik	6^{4}	0
(Switzerland) X Knoll (Belarus) V Lapko	7^{7}	6
WC	(United Kingdom) SB Grey (United Kingdom) E Silva	2	3
(United States) D Krawczyk (Mexico) G Olmos	6	6
(Romania) M Niculescu (Romania) E-G Ruse	7^{7}	6
(Chile) A Guarachi (New Zealand) E Routliffe	6^{5}	2

Semifinals
(Australia) E Perez (Australia) Ar Rodionova	4	6	[14]
(Switzerland) X Knoll (Belarus) V Lapko	6	4	[12]
(United States) D Krawczyk (Mexico) G Olmos	6	6
(Romania) M Niculescu (Romania) E-G Ruse	1	4

Final
(Australia) E Perez (Australia) Ar Rodionova	6^{5}	5
(United States) D Krawczyk (Mexico) G Olmos	7^{7}	7
