= 2018 Nottingham Open – Women's singles =

Women's singles
- 2018 Nottingham Open

Final
- Champion: (Australia) Ashleigh Barty
- Runner-up: (United Kingdom) Johanna Konta
- Score: 6–3, 3–6, 6–4

Details
- Draw: 32 (6 Q / 3 WC )
- Seeds: 8

Events
| Singles | men | women |
| Doubles | men | women |
| ← 2017 · | Nottingham Open | · 2019 → |

Donna Vekić was the defending champion, but lost in the semifinals to Johanna Konta in a rematch of the previous year's final.

Ashleigh Barty won the title, defeating Konta in the final, 6–3, 3–6, 6–4.

== Seeds ==
1. (Australia) Ashleigh Barty (champion)
2. (Slovakia) Magdaléna Rybáriková (second round)
3. (Japan) Naomi Osaka (semifinals)
4. (United Kingdom) Johanna Konta (final)
5. (Romania) Mihaela Buzărnescu (quarterfinals)
6. (Croatia) Donna Vekić (semifinals)
7. (Kazakhstan) Zarina Diyas (first round, retired)
8. (Italy) Camila Giorgi (first round)

== Draw ==
=== Key ===
- Q = Qualifier
- WC = Wild card
- LL = Lucky loser
- Alt = Alternate
- ITF = ITF entry
- PR = Protected ranking
- SR = Special ranking
- SE = Special exempt
- JE = Junior exempt
- JR = Junior Accelerator Programme entrant
- CO = College Accelerator Programme entrant
- NG = Next Gen Accelerator Program entrant
- w/o = Walkover
- r = Retired
- d = Defaulted

=== Finals ===
Semifinals
1 | (Australia) Ashleigh Barty | 6 | 6
3 | (Japan) Naomi Osaka | 3 | 4
4 | (United Kingdom) Johanna Konta | 6 | 6
6 | (Croatia) Donna Vekić | 2 | 3

Final
1 | (Australia) Ashleigh Barty | 6 | 3 | 6
4 | (United Kingdom) Johanna Konta | 3 | 6 | 4

=== Top half ===
First round
1 | (Australia) A Barty | 6 | 6
(Switzerland) S Vögele | 3 | 3
Q | (Russia) V Savinykh | 2 | 2
(China) Y Duan | 6 | 6
(Belgium) Y Wickmayer | 4 | 4
WC | (United Kingdom) K Boulter | 6 | 6
WC | (Australia) S Stosur | 2
7 | (Kazakhstan) Z Diyas | 1^{r}
3 | (Japan) N Osaka | 3 | 6 | 6
(United States) S Vickery | 6 | 1 | 2
(Czech Republic) D Allertová | 6 | 6
(United States) K Ahn | 3 | 1
Q | (United States) I Falconi | 6 | 6
(Australia) Ar Rodionova | 4 | 1
(Paraguay) V Cepede Royg | 2 | 6 | 6^{5}
5 | (Romania) M Buzărnescu | 6 | 3 | 7^{7}

Second round
1 | (Australia) A Barty | 6 | 6
(China) Y Duan | 3 | 2
WC | (United Kingdom) K Boulter | 7^{8} | 6
WC | (Australia) S Stosur | 6^{6} | 1
3 | (Japan) N Osaka | 6 | 6
(Czech Republic) D Allertová | 3 | 2
Q | (United States) I Falconi | 3 | 7 | 3
5 | (Romania) M Buzărnescu | 6 | 5 | 6

Quarterfinals
1 | (Australia) A Barty | 6 | 6
WC | (United Kingdom) K Boulter | 0 | 2
3 | (Japan) N Osaka | 6 | 6
5 | (Romania) M Buzărnescu | 4 | 1

Semifinals
1 | (Australia) A Barty | 6 | 6
3 | (Japan) N Osaka | 3 | 4

=== Bottom half ===
First round
8 | (Italy) C Giorgi | 6^{4} | 2
(Slovenia) D Jakupović | 7^{7} | 6
(Poland) M Fręch | 6 | 3 | 6
Q | (China) S Zheng | 2 | 6 | 3
(United Kingdom) H Watson | 6 | 6
Q | (United States) D Lao | 1 | 3
(Japan) K Nara | 2 | 3
4 | (United Kingdom) J Konta | 6 | 6
6 | (Croatia) D Vekić | 7 | 5 | 7^{7}
WC | (United Kingdom) G Taylor | 5 | 7 | 6^{3}
(Belarus) V Lapko | 7^{7} | 6
(Croatia) J Fett | 6^{5} | 4
(Germany) M Barthel | 7^{7} | 7
Q | (United Kingdom) K Swan | 6^{5} | 5
Q | (Romania) E-G Ruse | 0 | 6 | 1
2 | (Slovakia) M Rybáriková | 6 | 3 | 6

Second round
(Slovenia) D Jakupović | 6 | 6
(Poland) M Fręch | 4 | 3
(United Kingdom) H Watson | 4 | 6^{5}
4 | (United Kingdom) J Konta | 6 | 7^{7}
6 | (Croatia) D Vekić | 6 | 7^{8}
(Belarus) V Lapko | 2 | 6^{6}
(Germany) M Barthel | 6 | 1 | 7
2 | (Slovakia) M Rybáriková | 3 | 6 | 5

Quarterfinals
(Slovenia) D Jakupović | 4 | 2
4 | (United Kingdom) J Konta | 6 | 6
6 | (Croatia) D Vekić | 7 | 6
(Germany) M Barthel | 5 | 1

Semifinals
4 | (United Kingdom) J Konta | 6 | 6
6 | (Croatia) D Vekić | 2 | 3

== Qualifying ==
=== Seeds ===
1. (China) Zheng Saisai (qualified)
2. (United States) Irina Falconi (qualified)
3. (Australia) Lizette Cabrera (qualifying competition)
4. (Spain) Paula Badosa Gibert (qualifying competition)
5. (Japan) Miharu Imanishi (first round)
6. (Australia) Jaimee Fourlis (qualifying competition)
7. (India) Ankita Raina (first round)
8. (Romania) Elena-Gabriela Ruse (qualified)
9. (United Kingdom) Katie Swan (qualified)
10. (United States) Danielle Lao (qualified)
11. (Russia) Valeria Savinykh (qualified)
12. (Australia) Abbie Myers (first round)

=== Qualifiers ===
1. (China) Zheng Saisai
2. (United States) Irina Falconi
3. (Russia) Valeria Savinykh
4. (United Kingdom) Katie Swan
5. (Romania) Elena-Gabriela Ruse
6. (United States) Danielle Lao

=== Qualifying draw ===
==== First qualifier ====
First round
1 | (China) Zheng Saisai | 3 | 6 | 6
(Russia) Alla Kudryavtseva | 6 | 2 | 1
WC | (United Kingdom) Ella Taylor | 4 | 6 | 6
12 | (Australia) Abbie Myers | 6 | 1 | 4

Qualifying competition
1 | (China) Zheng Saisai | 6 | 6
WC | (United Kingdom) Ella Taylor | 3 | 4

==== Second qualifier ====
First round
2 | (United States) Irina Falconi | 6 | 6
(United Kingdom) Freya Christie | 2 | 2
(Australia) Naiktha Bains | 6 | 6
7 | (India) Ankita Raina | 0 | 4

Qualifying competition
2 | (United States) Irina Falconi | 7^{7} | 6^{7} | 6
(Australia) Naiktha Bains | 6^{0} | 7^{9} | 2

==== Third qualifier ====
First round
3 | (Australia) Lizette Cabrera | 6 | 6
(Bulgaria) Aleksandrina Naydenova | 1 | 1
WC | (United Kingdom) Jodie Burrage | 3 | 6^{6}
11 | (Russia) Valeria Savinykh | 6 | 7^{8}

Qualifying competition
3 | (Australia) Lizette Cabrera | 7^{7} | 5 | 3
11 | (Russia) Valeria Savinykh | 6^{3} | 7 | 6

==== Fourth qualifier ====
First round
4 | (Spain) Paula Badosa Gibert | 6 | 6
(United States) Ingrid Neel | 2 | 3
(Papua New Guinea) Abigail Tere-Apisah | 6 | 3 | 4
9 | (United Kingdom) Katie Swan | 4 | 6 | 6

Qualifying competition
4 | (Spain) Paula Badosa Gibert | 6 | 2 | 1
9 | (United Kingdom) Katie Swan | 2 | 6 | 6

==== Fifth qualifier ====
First round
5 | (Japan) Miharu Imanishi | 2 | 3
WC | (United Kingdom) Tara Moore | 6 | 6
WC | (United Kingdom) Eden Silva | 6^{8} | 4
8 | (Romania) Elena-Gabriela Ruse | 7^{10} | 6

Qualifying competition
WC | (United Kingdom) Tara Moore | 2 | 6 | 4
8 | (Romania) Elena-Gabriela Ruse | 6 | 3 | 6

==== Sixth qualifier ====
First round
6 | (Australia) Jaimee Fourlis | 3 | 6 | 6
(United States) Abigail Spears | 6 | 3 | 4
(Australia) Anastasia Rodionova | 3 | 2
10 | (United States) Danielle Lao | 6 | 6

Qualifying competition
6 | (Australia) Jaimee Fourlis | 3 | 2
10 | (United States) Danielle Lao | 6 | 6
