= 2019 Nottingham Open – Men's singles =

Men's singles
- 2019 Nottingham Open

Final
- Champion: (United Kingdom) Dan Evans
- Runner-up: (Russia) Evgeny Donskoy
- Score: 7–6^{(7–3)}, 6–3

Details
- Draw: 48
- Seeds: 16

Events
Singles	men	women
Doubles	men	women
- Nottingham Open

Alex de Minaur was the defending champion but chose not to defend his title.

Dan Evans won the title after defeating Evgeny Donskoy 7–6^{(7–3)}, 6–3 in the final.

== Seeds ==
All seeds receive a bye into the second round.

1. (United Kingdom) Dan Evans (champion)
2. (Australia) Bernard Tomic (second round, retired)
3. (Croatia) Ivo Karlović (third round)
4. (Spain) Marcel Granollers (second round)
5. (Austria) Dennis Novak (quarterfinals)
6. (Germany) Yannick Maden (third round)
7. (Poland) Kamil Majchrzak (second round)
8. (Canada) Peter Polansky (second round)
9. (South Korea) Kwon Soon-woo (third round)
10. (Austria) Sebastian Ofner (third round, retired)
11. (India) Ramkumar Ramanathan (second round)
12. (Germany) Oscar Otte (second round)
13. (Russia) Evgeny Donskoy (final)
14. (France) Antoine Hoang (semifinals)
15. (Sweden) Mikael Ymer (third round)
16. (Czech Republic) Lukáš Rosol (quarterfinals)

== Draw ==
Key

- Q = Qualifier
- WC = Wild card
- LL = Lucky loser
- Alt = Alternate
- ITF = ITF entry
- PR = Protected ranking
- SR = Special ranking
- SE = Special exempt
- JE = Junior exempt
- JR = Junior Accelerator Programme entrant
- CO = College Accelerator Programme entrant
- NG = Next Gen Accelerator Program entrant
- w/o = Walkover
- r = Retired
- d = Defaulted

=== Finals ===
Quarterfinals
1/WC	(United Kingdom) Dan Evans	7^{8}	6^{6}	6
(Germany) Dominik Köpfer	6^{6}	7^{8}	4
16	(Czech Republic) Lukáš Rosol	4	4
(Japan) Go Soeda	6	6
5	(Austria) Dennis Novak	7^{17}	5	6^{6}
13	(Russia) Evgeny Donskoy	6^{15}	7	7^{8}
(Belgium) Ruben Bemelmans	3	4
14	(France) Antoine Hoang	6	6

Semifinals
1/WC	(United Kingdom) Dan Evans	6	6
(Japan) Go Soeda	4	2
13	(Russia) Evgeny Donskoy	6	6
14	(France) Antoine Hoang	3	2

Final
1/WC	(United Kingdom) Dan Evans	7^{7}	6
13	(Russia) Evgeny Donskoy	6^{3}	3

=== Top half ===
==== Section 1 ====
First round
WC	(United Kingdom) J Draper	5	6	6
(South Korea) Y-s Chung	7	0	2
(United States) C Eubanks	6	7^{7}
(Japan) Yo Watanuki	1	6^{3}
(India) S Myneni	7^{7}	6
(Germany) M Moraing	6^{2}	3
(Germany) D Köpfer	6	0
(Serbia) V Troicki	4	0^{r}

Second round
1/WC	(United Kingdom) D Evans	7	6
WC	(United Kingdom) J Draper	5	3
(United States) C Eubanks	4	6	2
15	(Sweden) M Ymer	6	3	6
10	(Austria) S Ofner	6	7
(India) S Myneni	4	5
(Germany) D Köpfer	6	6
7	(Poland) K Majchrzak	3	4

Third round
1/WC	(United Kingdom) D Evans	6	2	7
15	(Sweden) M Ymer	2	6	5
10	(Austria) S Ofner	2	0^{r}
(Germany) D Köpfer	6	2

Quarterfinals
1/WC	(United Kingdom) D Evans	7^{8}	6^{6}	6
(Germany) D Köpfer	6^{6}	7^{8}	4

==== Section 2 ====
First round
(Japan) T Ito	6	6
(Australia) J Kubler	4	4
(Australia) J-P Smith	6	6
(France) E Couacaud	4	2
(Japan) G Soeda	6	6
(Turkey) C İlkel	2	0
(Australia) J Duckworth	6	2
(United Kingdom) J Clarke	4	0^{r}

Second round
4	(Spain) M Granollers	3	5
(Japan) T Ito	6	7
(Australia) J-P Smith	1	7^{7}	3
16	(Czech Republic) L Rosol	6	6^{4}	6
12	(Germany) O Otte	2	3
(Japan) G Soeda	6	6
(Australia) J Duckworth	6^{4}	7^{7}	6
8	(Canada) P Polansky	7^{7}	6^{4}	3

Third round
(Japan) T Ito	4	7^{7}	3
16	(Czech Republic) L Rosol	6	6^{0}	6
(Japan) G Soeda	7^{7}	6
(Australia) J Duckworth	6^{4}	2

Quarterfinals
16	(Czech Republic) L Rosol	4	4
(Japan) G Soeda	6	6

=== Bottom half ===
==== Section 3 ====
First round
WC	(United Kingdom) P Jubb	6^{7}	6	6
(Estonia) J Zopp	7^{9}	4	4
WC	(United Kingdom) E Hoyt	4	6^{5}
(Bosnia and Herzegovina) M Bašić	6	7^{7}
Alt	(United States) E Escobedo	6^{6}	6	7^{9}
(United States) JC Aragone	7^{8}	4	6^{7}
(Italy) S Napolitano	7	7^{7}
(United Kingdom) J Ward	5	6^{1}

Second round
5	(Austria) D Novak	7	7
WC	(United Kingdom) P Jubb	5	5
(Bosnia and Herzegovina) M Bašić	6^{4}	4
9	(South Korea) S-w Kwon	7^{7}	6
13	(Russia) E Donskoy	7	6
Alt	(United States) E Escobedo	5	4
(Italy) S Napolitano	6^{4}	6	3
3/SE	(Croatia) I Karlović	7^{7}	4	6

Third round
5	(Austria) D Novak	7^{7}	6
9	(South Korea) S-w Kwon	6^{4}	3
13	(Russia) E Donskoy	6	6^{7}	7^{8}
3/SE	(Croatia) I Karlović	3	7^{9}	6^{6}

Quarterfinals
5	(Austria) D Novak	7^{17}	5	6^{6}
13	(Russia) E Donskoy	6^{15}	7	7^{8}

==== Section 4 ====
First round
(Japan) Y Sugita	6	3	6
(China) Ze Zhang	3	6	3
(Australia) A Harris	3	2
(Belgium) R Bemelmans	6	6
WC	(United Kingdom) L Broady	4	5
(Germany) T Kamke	6	7
Q	(United Kingdom) R Peniston	4	6	6
Q	(United Kingdom) B Klein	6	4	4

Second round
6	(Germany) Y Maden	6	6
(Japan) Y Sugita	1	3
(Belgium) R Bemelmans	6	6
11	(India) R Ramanathan	1	0
14	(France) A Hoang	5	6	6
(Germany) T Kamke	7	4	2
Q	(United Kingdom) R Peniston	7^{7}	1
2	(Australia) B Tomic	6^{2}	0^{r}

Third round
6	(Germany) Y Maden	6	3	4
(Belgium) R Bemelmans	4	6	6
14	(France) A Hoang	7^{7}	6
Q	(United Kingdom) R Peniston	6^{3}	2

Quarterfinals
(Belgium) R Bemelmans	3	4
14	(France) A Hoang	6	6
