= 2021 Nottingham Open – Men's doubles =

Men's doubles
- 2021 Nottingham Open

Final
- Champions: (Australia) Matt Reid (United Kingdom) Ken Skupski
- Runners-up: (Australia) Matthew Ebden (Australia) John-Patrick Smith
- Score: 4–6, 7–5, [10–6]

Events
Singles	men	women
Doubles	men	women
← 2019 ·	Nottingham Open	· 2022 →

Santiago González and Aisam-ul-Haq Qureshi were the defending champions, but chose not to defend their title.

Matt Reid and Ken Skupski won the title after defeating Matthew Ebden and John-Patrick Smith 4–6, 7–5, [10–6] in the final.

== Seeds ==
1. (United Kingdom) Luke Bambridge / (United Kingdom) Jonny O'Mara (first round)
2. (Australia) Matthew Ebden / (Australia) John-Patrick Smith (final)
3. (Australia) Matt Reid / (United Kingdom) Ken Skupski (champions)
4. (United States) Nathaniel Lammons / (United States) Jackson Withrow (semifinals)

== Draw ==
=== Key ===
- Q = Qualifier
- WC = Wild card
- LL = Lucky loser
- Alt = Alternate
- SE = Special exempt
- PR = Protected ranking
- ITF = ITF entry
- JE = Junior exempt
- w/o = Walkover
- r = Retired
- d = Defaulted
- SR = Special ranking

First round
1	(United Kingdom) L Bambridge (United Kingdom) J O'Mara	6^{3}	6	[7]
(France) A Hoang (India) R Ramanathan	7^{7}	3	[10]
(United States) M Cressy (Italy) A Vavassori	4	6	[10]
(Switzerland) M-A Hüsler (Australia) M Purcell	6	3	[3]
3	(Australia) M Reid (United Kingdom) K Skupski	6	2	[11]
(United States) M McDonald (United States) B Nakashima	4	6	[9]
(Italy) T Fabbiano (Italy) A Seppi	6^{4}	6^{6}
WC	(United Kingdom) J Clarke (Australia) T Kokkinakis	7^{7}	7^{8}
WC	(United Kingdom) L Broady (United Kingdom) R Peniston	2	6^{2}
(Australia) M Polmans (New Zealand) A Sitak	6	7^{7}
(United States) D Kudla (China) Zh Zhang	7^{7}	6^{5}	[6]
4	(United States) N Lammons (United States) J Withrow	6^{2}	7^{7}	[10]
(United Kingdom) L Glasspool (Finland) H Heliövaara	6	6
WC	(United Kingdom) A Gray (United Kingdom) S Parker	2	3
(Russia) E Donskoy (Poland) K Majchrzak	4	6^{4}
2	(Australia) M Ebden (Australia) J-P Smith	6	7^{7}

Quarterfinals
(France) A Hoang (India) R Ramanathan	6	6
(United States) M Cressy (Italy) A Vavassori	4	4
3	(Australia) M Reid (United Kingdom) K Skupski	2	7^{7}	[11]
WC	(United Kingdom) J Clarke (Australia) T Kokkinakis	6	6^{3}	[9]
(Australia) M Polmans (New Zealand) A Sitak	4	2
4	(United States) N Lammons (United States) J Withrow	6	6
(United Kingdom) L Glasspool (Finland) H Heliövaara	4	2
2	(Australia) M Ebden (Australia) J-P Smith	6	6

Semifinals
(France) A Hoang (India) R Ramanathan	5	3
3	(Australia) M Reid (United Kingdom) K Skupski	7	6
4	(United States) N Lammons (United States) J Withrow	7	4	[12]
2	(Australia) M Ebden (Australia) J-P Smith	5	6	[14]

Final
3	(Australia) M Reid (United Kingdom) K Skupski	4	7	[10]
2	(Australia) M Ebden (Australia) J-P Smith	6	5	[6]
