= 2022 Nottingham Open =

- Date: 6–12 June
- Edition: 14th (women); 26th (men)
- Category: WTA 250 (women); ATP Challenger Tour (men)
- Draw: 32S / 16D (women); 32S / 16D (men)
- Surface: Grass
- Location: Nottingham, United Kingdom
- Venue: Nottingham Tennis Centre

Champions

Men's singles
- (United Kingdom) Dan Evans

Women's singles
- (Brazil) Beatriz Haddad Maia

Men's doubles
- (United Kingdom) Jonny O'Mara / (United Kingdom) Ken Skupski

Women's doubles
- (Brazil) Beatriz Haddad Maia / (China) Zhang Shuai
← 2021 ·	Nottingham Open	· 2023 →

The 2022 Nottingham Open (also known as the Rothesay Open Nottingham for sponsorship purposes) was a professional tennis tournament played on outdoor grass courts. It was the 14th edition of the event for women and the 26th edition for men. It was classified as a WTA 250 on the 2022 WTA Tour for the women, and as an ATP Challenger Tour event for the men. The event took place at the Nottingham Tennis Centre in Nottingham, United Kingdom from 6 through 12 June 2022.

== Champions ==
=== Men's singles ===
- (United Kingdom) Dan Evans def. (Australia) Jordan Thompson 6–4, 6–4.

=== Women's singles ===
- (Brazil) Beatriz Haddad Maia def. (United States) Alison Riske, 6–4, 1–6, 6–3

This was Haddad Maia's maiden WTA Tour singles title.

=== Men's doubles ===
- (United Kingdom) Jonny O'Mara / (United Kingdom) Ken Skupski def. (United Kingdom) Julian Cash / (United Kingdom) Henry Patten 3–6, 6–2, [16–14].

=== Women's doubles ===
- (Brazil) Beatriz Haddad Maia / (China) Zhang Shuai def. (United States) Caroline Dolehide / (Romania) Monica Niculescu 7–6^{(7–2)}, 6–3

== ATP singles main-draw entrants ==
=== Seeds ===
Country	Player	Rank^{1}	Seed
GBR	Dan Evans	32	1
CZE	Jiří Veselý	73	2
AUS	Jordan Thompson	82	3
AUS	John Millman	91	4
AUS	Alexei Popyrin	102	5
ESP	Fernando Verdasco	107	6
USA	Jack Sock	109	7
SUI	Marc-Andrea Hüsler	119	8

- ^{1} Rankings are as of 23 May 2022.

=== Other entrants ===
The following players received wildcards into the main draw:

- (United Kingdom) Dan Evans
- (United Kingdom) Alastair Gray
- (United Kingdom) Paul Jubb

The following player received entry into the singles main draw as a special exempt:

- (Australia) Jordan Thompson

The following player received entry into the singles main draw as an alternate:

- (Croatia) Duje Ajduković

The following players received entry from the qualifying draw:

- (Switzerland) Antoine Bellier
- (Romania) Marius Copil
- (United Kingdom) Daniel Cox
- (Chinese Taipei) Jason Jung
- (Germany) Henri Squire
- (Finland) Otto Virtanen

== WTA singles main-draw entrants ==
=== Seeds ===
Country	Player	Rank^{1}	Seed
GRE	Maria Sakkari	3	1
GBR	Emma Raducanu	12	2
ITA	Camila Giorgi	30	3
CHN	Zhang Shuai	41	4
AUS	Ajla Tomljanović	42	5
USA	Alison Riske	43	6
BRA	Beatriz Haddad Maia	48	7
POL	Magda Linette	52	8

- ^{1} Rankings are as of 23 May 2022.

=== Other entrants ===
The following players received wildcards into the main draw:

- (United Kingdom) Jodie Burrage
- (United Kingdom) Sonay Kartal
- (United Kingdom) Emma Raducanu
- (Greece) Maria Sakkari

The following players received entry from the qualifying draw:

- (United Kingdom) Katie Boulter
- (Spain) Cristina Bucșa
- (Poland) Katarzyna Kawa
- (United Kingdom) Yuriko Miyazaki
- (United Kingdom) Eden Silva
- (Ukraine) Daria Snigur

The following player received entry using a special ranking:

- (Germany) Tatjana Maria

=== Withdrawals ===
Before the tournament

- (Romania) Sorana Cîrstea → replaced by (United States) Katie Volynets
- (France) Alizé Cornet → replaced by (Canada) Rebecca Marino
- (Tunisia) Ons Jabeur → replaced by (China) Zhu Lin
- (United States) Sofia Kenin → replaced by (United Kingdom) Heather Watson
- (Croatia) Ana Konjuh → replaced by (Germany) Tatjana Maria
- (United States) Jessica Pegula → replaced by (China) Wang Qiang
- (Romania) Elena-Gabriela Ruse → replaced by (Croatia) Donna Vekić
- (Denmark) Clara Tauson → replaced by (United Kingdom) Harriet Dart

== WTA doubles main-draw entrants ==
=== Seeds ===
Country	Player	Country	Player	Rank^{1}	Seed
BRA	Beatriz Haddad Maia	CHN	Zhang Shuai	38	1
USA	Asia Muhammad	JPN	Ena Shibahara	46	2
JPN	Shuko Aoyama	TPE	Chan Hao-ching	54	3
USA	Caroline Dolehide	ROU	Monica Niculescu	60	4

- ^{1} Rankings are as of 23 May 2022.

=== Withdrawals ===
Before the tournament

- (Romania) Monica Niculescu / (Romania) Elena-Gabriela Ruse → replaced by (United States) Caroline Dolehide / (Romania) Monica Niculescu
- (China) Xu Yifan / (China) Yang Zhaoxuan → replaced by (United Kingdom) Alicia Barnett / (United Kingdom) Olivia Nicholls
