= 2019 Nottingham Open =

- Date: 10–16 June
- Edition: 12th (women); 24th (men)
- Category: WTA International (women); ATP Challenger Tour (men)
- Draw: 32S / 16D (women); 48S / 16D (men)
- Surface: Grass
- Location: Nottingham, United Kingdom
- Venue: Nottingham Tennis Centre

Champions

Men's singles
- (United Kingdom) Dan Evans

Women's singles
- (France) Caroline Garcia

Men's doubles
- (Mexico) Santiago González / (Pakistan) Aisam-ul-Haq Qureshi

Women's doubles
- (United States) Desirae Krawczyk / (Mexico) Giuliana Olmos
← 2018 ·	Nottingham Open	· 2021 →

The 2019 Nottingham Open (also known as the Nature Valley Open for sponsorship purposes) was a professional tennis tournament played on outdoor grass courts. It was the 12th edition of the event for women and the 24th edition for men. It is classified as a WTA International tournament on the 2019 WTA Tour for the women, and as an ATP Challenger Tour event for the men. The event took place at the Nottingham Tennis Centre in Nottingham, United Kingdom from 10 through 16 June 2019.

== ATP singles main-draw entrants ==
=== Seeds ===
Country	Player	Rank^{1}	Seed
GBR	Dan Evans	80	1
AUS	Bernard Tomic	84	2
CRO	Ivo Karlović	94	3
ESP	Marcel Granollers	107	4
AUT	Dennis Novak	113	5
GER	Yannick Maden	114	6
POL	Kamil Majchrzak	117	7
CAN	Peter Polansky	123	8
KOR	Kwon Soon-woo	135	9
AUT	Sebastian Ofner	140	10
IND	Ramkumar Ramanathan	143	11
GER	Oscar Otte	144	12
RUS	Evgeny Donskoy	145	13
FRA	Antoine Hoang	146	14
SWE	Mikael Ymer	148	15
CZE	Lukáš Rosol	149	16

- ^{1} Rankings are as of 27 May 2019.

=== Other entrants ===
The following players received wildcards into the main draw:

- (United Kingdom) Liam Broady
- (United Kingdom) Jack Draper
- (United Kingdom) Dan Evans
- (United Kingdom) Evan Hoyt
- (United Kingdom) Paul Jubb

The following player received entry into the singles main draw as a special exempt:

- (Croatia) Ivo Karlović

The following player received entry into the singles main draw as an alternate:

- (United States) Ernesto Escobedo

The following players received entry from the qualifying draw:

- (United Kingdom) Brydan Klein
- (United Kingdom) Ryan Peniston

== WTA singles main-draw entrants ==
=== Seeds ===
Country	Player	Rank^{1}	Seed
FRA	Caroline Garcia	22	1
CRO	Donna Vekić	24	2
~~KAZ~~	~~Yulia Putintseva~~	~~28~~	~~3~~
GRE	Maria Sakkari	30	4
~~UKR~~	~~Dayana Yastremska~~	~~32~~	~~5~~
AUS	Ajla Tomljanović	47	6
CHN	Zhang Shuai	50	7
FRA	Kristina Mladenovic	53	8
GER	Tatjana Maria	57	9
RUS	Evgeniya Rodina	70	10

- ^{1} Rankings are as of 27 May 2019.

=== Other entrants ===
The following players received wildcards into the main draw:

- (United Kingdom) Naiktha Bains
- (United Kingdom) Maia Lumsden
- (United Kingdom) Katie Swan

The following player received entry using a protected ranking into the main draw:

- (United States) Shelby Rogers

The following players received entry from the qualifying draw:

- (Poland) Magdalena Fręch
- (United States) Danielle Lao
- (United Kingdom) Tara Moore
- (Australia) Ellen Perez
- (Romania) Elena-Gabriela Ruse
- (Russia) Liudmila Samsonova

The following players received entry as lucky losers:

- (France) Chloé Paquet
- (India) Ankita Raina

=== Withdrawals ===
- (Australia) Ashleigh Barty → replaced by (Slovenia) Dalila Jakupović
- (United Kingdom) Katie Boulter → replaced by (Australia) Astra Sharma
- (Romania) Mihaela Buzărnescu → replaced by (Spain) Sara Sorribes Tormo
- (Russia) Vitalia Diatchenko → replaced by (United States) Bernarda Pera
- (Australia) Daria Gavrilova → replaced by (United States) Jennifer Brady
- (Italy) Camila Giorgi → replaced by (Romania) Monica Niculescu
- (United Kingdom) Johanna Konta → replaced by (United Kingdom) Heather Watson
- (Russia) Anastasia Potapova → replaced by (Serbia) Ivana Jorović
- (Kazakhstan) Yulia Putintseva → replaced by (France) Chloé Paquet
- (Czech Republic) Barbora Strýcová → replaced by (United Kingdom) Harriet Dart
- (Czech Republic) Markéta Vondroušová → replaced by (United States) Shelby Rogers
- (Ukraine) Dayana Yastremska → replaced by (India) Ankita Raina

=== Retirements ===
- (Slovakia) Magdaléna Rybáriková (respiratory infection)

== WTA doubles main-draw entrants ==
=== Seeds ===
Country	Player	Country	Player	Rank^{1}	Seed
CAN	Gabriela Dabrowski	CHN	Xu Yifan	22	1
POL	Alicja Rosolska	CHN	Yang Zhaoxuan	55	2
CRO	Darija Jurak	SLO	Katarina Srebotnik	67	3
JPN	Makoto Ninomiya	CZE	Renata Voráčová	107	4

- ^{1} Rankings are as of 27 May 2019.

=== Other entrants ===
The following pairs received wildcards into the doubles main draw:

- (United Kingdom) Naiktha Bains / (United Kingdom) Freya Christie
- (United Kingdom) Sarah Beth Grey / (United Kingdom) Eden Silva

== Champions ==
=== Men's singles ===
- (United Kingdom) Dan Evans def. (Russia) Evgeny Donskoy 7–6^{(7–3)}, 6–3.

=== Women's singles ===
- (France) Caroline Garcia def. (Croatia) Donna Vekić, 2–6, 7–6^{(7–4)}, 7–6^{(7–4)}

=== Men's doubles ===
- (Mexico) Santiago González / (Pakistan) Aisam-ul-Haq Qureshi def. (China) Gong Maoxin / (China) Zhang Ze 4–6, 7–6^{(7–5)}, [10–5].

=== Women's doubles ===
- (United States) Desirae Krawczyk / (Mexico) Giuliana Olmos def. (Australia) Ellen Perez / (Australia) Arina Rodionova, 7–6^{(7–5)}, 7–5
