= 2017 Nottingham Open – Men's singles =

Men's singles
- 2017 Nottingham Open

Final
- Champion: (Israel) Dudi Sela
- Runner-up: (Italy) Thomas Fabbiano
- Score: 4–6, 6–4, 6–3

Details
- Draw: 32
- Seeds: 8

Events
Singles	men	women
Doubles	men	women
- Nottingham Open

This was the first edition of the tournament at the Challenger level.

Dudi Sela won the title after defeating Thomas Fabbiano 4–6, 6–4, 6–3 in the final.

== Seeds ==
1. (United Kingdom) Dan Evans (withdrew)
2. (Romania) Marius Copil (semifinals, retired)
3. (Israel) Dudi Sela (champion)
4. (Italy) Thomas Fabbiano (final)
5. (Japan) Go Soeda (first round)
6. (Barbados) Darian King (first round)
7. (Italy) Luca Vanni (first round)
8. (Ukraine) Illya Marchenko (second round)

== Draw ==
Key

- Q = Qualifier
- WC = Wild card
- LL = Lucky loser
- Alt = Alternate
- ITF = ITF entry
- PR = Protected ranking
- SR = Special ranking
- SE = Special exempt
- JE = Junior exempt
- JR = Junior Accelerator Programme entrant
- CO = College Accelerator Programme entrant
- NG = Next Gen Accelerator Program entrant
- w/o = Walkover
- r = Retired
- d = Defaulted

=== Finals ===
Semifinals
Q	(Australia) Sam Groth	4	3
4	(Italy) Thomas Fabbiano	6	6
3	(Israel) Dudi Sela	7^{7}	1
2	(Romania) Marius Copil	6^{4}	0^{r}

Final
4	(Italy) Thomas Fabbiano	6	4	3
3	(Israel) Dudi Sela	4	6	6

=== Top half ===
First round
LL	(Australia) A De Minaur	6^{5}	3
WC	(United Kingdom) B Klein	7^{7}	6
(Canada) P Polansky	3	6^{8}
Q	(Australia) S Groth	6	7^{10}
(Australia) J Millman	6	6
(Japan) H Moriya	3	2
Q	(Australia) J-P Smith	4	7^{7}	7^{7}
7	(Italy) L Vanni	6	6^{5}	6^{1}
4	(Italy) T Fabbiano	6	6^{1}	6
(Canada) D Shapovalov	4	7^{7}	3
WC	(United Kingdom) J Clarke	6^{2}	1
PR	(India) Y Bhambri	7^{7}	6
(Ukraine) S Stakhovsky	6	7^{7}
(Japan) A Santillan	4	6^{4}
WC	(United Kingdom) L Broady	5	2
8	(Ukraine) I Marchenko	7	6

Second round
WC	(United Kingdom) B Klein	3	4
Q	(Australia) S Groth	6	6
(Australia) J Millman	6^{3}	6	3
Q	(Australia) J-P Smith	7^{7}	2	6
4	(Italy) T Fabbiano	7^{10}	6
PR	(India) Y Bhambri	6^{8}	0
(Ukraine) S Stakhovsky	6	7^{11}
8	(Ukraine) I Marchenko	4	6^{9}

Quarterfinals
Q	(Australia) S Groth	7^{8}	6
Q	(Australia) J-P Smith	6^{6}	2
4	(Italy) T Fabbiano	4	6	7^{7}
(Ukraine) S Stakhovsky	6	2	6^{5}

Semifinals
Q	(Australia) S Groth	4	3
4	(Italy) T Fabbiano	6	6

=== Bottom half ===
First round
5	(Japan) G Soeda	2	2
Q	(United Kingdom) L Glasspool	6	6
(Australia) M Polmans	6	6
(Australia) A Whittington	4	4
Q	(Lithuania) R Berankis	6	4	6
(Germany) T Kamke	4	6	4
(United States) D Kudla	2	2
3	(Israel) D Sela	6	6
6	(Barbados) D King	7^{7}	2	6^{1}
(United States) B Fratangelo	6^{5}	6	7^{7}
WC	(United Kingdom) C Norrie	5	7	4
(France) K de Schepper	7	5	6
(United States) M Mmoh	6^{2}	4
(United States) R Opelka	7^{7}	6
(Russia) K Kravchuk	3	4
2	(Romania) M Copil	6	6

Second round
Q	(United Kingdom) L Glasspool	6	6
(Australia) M Polmans	2	3
Q	(Lithuania) R Berankis	3	4
3	(Israel) D Sela	6	6
(United States) B Fratangelo	6	6
(France) K de Schepper	4	4
(United States) R Opelka	3	6^{2}
2	(Romania) M Copil	6	7^{7}

Quarterfinals
Q	(United Kingdom) L Glasspool	2	6^{4}
3	(Israel) D Sela	6	7^{7}
(United States) B Fratangelo	6^{5}	4
2	(Romania) M Copil	7^{7}	6

Semifinals
3	(Israel) D Sela	7^{7}	1
2	(Romania) M Copil	6^{4}	0^{r}
