= 2021 Nottingham Open – Women's singles =

Women's singles
- 2021 Nottingham Open

Final
- Champion: (United Kingdom) Johanna Konta
- Runner-up: (China) Zhang Shuai
- Score: 6–2, 6–1

Details
- Draw: 48 (8 Q / 5 WC )
- Seeds: 16

Events
Singles	men	women
Doubles	men	women
← 2019 ·	Nottingham Open	· 2022 →

Johanna Konta defeated Zhang Shuai in the final, 6–2, 6–1 to win the women's singles tennis title at the 2021 Nottingham Open. The win earned Konta her fourth career singles title, her first since 2017, and made her the first British player to win a WTA Tour singles title on home soil since Sue Barker in 1981. This would also be Konta's final title before she announced her retirement in December 2021 due to a long-term knee injury.

Caroline Garcia was the reigning champion from when the event was last held in 2019, but she did not return to compete.

This tournament marked the WTA Tour main draw debut of future US Open champion Emma Raducanu; she lost in the first round to Harriet Dart.

== Seeds ==
All seeds received byes into the second round.

1. (United Kingdom) Johanna Konta (champion)
2. (United States) Alison Riske (third round)
3. (Croatia) Donna Vekić (third round)
4. (China) Zhang Shuai (final)
5. (United States) Danielle Collins (withdrew)
6. (Czech Republic) Marie Bouzková (second round)
7. (France) Kristina Mladenovic (quarterfinals)
8. (Belgium) Alison Van Uytvanck (quarterfinals)
9. (United Kingdom) Heather Watson (third round)
10. (Switzerland) Viktorija Golubic (third round)
11. (Italy) Camila Giorgi (withdrew)
12. (Japan) Nao Hibino (second round)
13. (United States) Madison Brengle (second round)
14. (United States) Lauren Davis (semifinals)
15. (Serbia) Nina Stojanović (semifinals)
16. (Kazakhstan) Zarina Diyas (third round)
17. (Czech Republic) Tereza Martincová (quarterfinals)
18. (United States) Christina McHale (second round)

== Draw ==
=== Key ===
- Q = Qualifier
- WC = Wild card
- LL = Lucky loser
- Alt = Alternate
- SE = Special exempt
- PR = Protected ranking
- ITF = ITF entry
- JE = Junior exempt
- w/o = Walkover
- r = Retired
- d = Defaulted
- SR = Special ranking

=== Finals ===
Quarterfinals
1	(United Kingdom) Johanna Konta	6	7^{8}
8	(Belgium) Alison Van Uytvanck	3	6^{6}
15	(Serbia) Nina Stojanović	6	6
17	(Czech Republic) Tereza Martincová	2	4
7	(France) Kristina Mladenovic	6	2	6^{4}
4	(China) Zhang Shuai	3	6	7^{7}
WC	(United Kingdom) Katie Boulter	7^{8}	0^{r}
14	(United States) Lauren Davis	6^{6}	2

Semifinals
1	(United Kingdom) Johanna Konta	6	6^{2}	7
15	(Serbia) Nina Stojanović	2	7^{7}	5
4	(China) Zhang Shuai	6	6
14	(United States) Lauren Davis	4	3

Final
1	(United Kingdom) Johanna Konta	6	6
4	(China) Zhang Shuai	2	1

=== Top half ===
==== Section 1 ====
First round
(Australia) M Inglis	1	4
Q	(Netherlands) L Pattinama Kerkhove	6	6
(Russia) A Gasanova	6	4	4
Q	(Ukraine) K Kozlova	1	6	6
(United States) K Ahn	1	6	6
WC	(United Kingdom) J Burrage	6	3	2
Q	(United States) K Volynets	3	6	6^{6}
LL	(Russia) M Melnikova	6	2	7^{8}

Second round
1	(United Kingdom) J Konta	6	6
Q	(Netherlands) L Pattinama Kerkhove	1	3
Q	(Ukraine) K Kozlova	6	5	6
13	(United States) M Brengle	3	7	3
10	(Switzerland) V Golubic	6	0
(United States) K Ahn	1	0^{r}
LL	(Russia) M Melnikova	1	1
8	(Belgium) A Van Uytvanck	6	6

Third round
1	(United Kingdom) J Konta	6	1	6
Q	(Ukraine) K Kozlova	2	6	3
10	(Switzerland) V Golubic	1	5
8	(Belgium) A Van Uytvanck	6	7

Quarterfinals
1	(United Kingdom) J Konta	6	7^{8}
8	(Belgium) A Van Uytvanck	3	6^{6}

==== Section 2 ====
First round
(Switzerland) L Küng	6	6
Q	(United Kingdom) SB Grey	2	2
(France) O Dodin	7^{7}	6
Q	(United States) C Vandeweghe	6^{4}	4
WC	(United Kingdom) F Jones	6	3	4
LL	(Spain) G García Pérez	4	6	6
(United States) C Dolehide	6	6
(Italy) G Gatto-Monticone	4	3

Second round
3	(Croatia) D Vekić	7	6
(Switzerland) L Küng	5	1
(France) O Dodin	6^{4}	5
15	(Serbia) N Stojanović	7^{7}	7
18	(United States) C McHale	7^{9}	4	5
LL	(Spain) G García Pérez	6^{7}	6	7
(United States) C Dolehide	2	3
17	(Czech Republic) T Martincová	6	6

Third round
3	(Croatia) D Vekić	3	4
15	(Serbia) N Stojanović	6	6
LL	(Spain) G García Pérez	1	6	2
17	(Czech Republic) T Martincová	6	3	6

Quarterfinals
15	(Serbia) N Stojanović	6	6
17	(Czech Republic) T Martincová	2	4

=== Bottom half ===
==== Section 3 ====
First round
(Bulgaria) V Tomova	4	7^{7}	2
(Japan) K Nara	6	6^{1}	6
(United States) C McNally	6	6
Q	(India) A Raina	4	3
(China) Y Wang	3	7^{7}	2
(Australia) L Cabrera	6	6^{4}	6
(Australia) Ar Rodionova	5	7^{7}	6
(China) Xin Wang	7	6^{4}	4

Second round
7	(France) K Mladenovic	6	5	6
(Japan) K Nara	2	7	2
(United States) C McNally	6	6
12	(Japan) N Hibino	0	3
16	(Kazakhstan) Z Diyas	4	6	6
(Australia) L Cabrera	6	3	4
(Australia) Ar Rodionova	4	3
4	(China) S Zhang	6	6

Third round
7	(France) K Mladenovic	7^{8}	1	6
(United States) C McNally	6^{6}	6	1
16	(Kazakhstan) Z Diyas	4	2
4	(China) S Zhang	6	6

Quarterfinals
7	(France) K Mladenovic	6	2	6^{4}
4	(China) S Zhang	3	6	7^{7}

==== Section 4 ====
First round
(Colombia) C Osorio	2	3
WC	(United Kingdom) K Boulter	6	6
Q	(United Kingdom) E Silva	2	6	6^{3}
Q	(United Kingdom) T Moore	6	3	7^{7}
WC	(United Kingdom) E Raducanu	3	4
(United Kingdom) H Dart	6	6
LL	(Italy) M Di Giuseppe	6^{3}	6^{2}
(China) Xiy Wang	7^{7}	7^{7}

Second round
6	(Czech Republic) M Bouzková	4	3
WC	(United Kingdom) K Boulter	6	6
Q	(United Kingdom) T Moore	3	6	2
9	(United Kingdom) H Watson	6	4	6
14	(United States) L Davis	1	6	6
(United Kingdom) H Dart	6	3	4
(China) Xiy Wang	6	5	6^{3}
2	(United States) A Riske	3	7	7^{7}

Third round
WC	(United Kingdom) K Boulter	7^{7}	6
9	(United Kingdom) H Watson	6^{4}	3
14	(United States) L Davis	6^{3}	6	6
2	(United States) A Riske	7^{7}	4	4

Quarterfinals
WC	(United Kingdom) K Boulter	7^{8}	0^{r}
14	(United States) L Davis	6^{6}	2

== Qualifying ==
=== Seeds ===
1. (Ukraine) Kateryna Kozlova (qualified)
2. (Italy) Giulia Gatto-Monticone (moved to main draw)
3. (Russia) Anastasia Gasanova (moved to main draw)
4. (Netherlands) Lesley Pattinama Kerkhove (qualified)
5. (India) Ankita Raina (qualified)
6. (Spain) Georgina García Pérez (qualifying competition; Lucky loser)
7. (Russia) Marina Melnikova (qualifying competition; Lucky loser)
8. (Italy) Martina Di Giuseppe (qualifying competition; Lucky loser)

=== Qualifiers ===
1. (Ukraine) Kateryna Kozlova
2. (United Kingdom) Eden Silva
3. (United Kingdom) Sarah Beth Grey
4. (Netherlands) Lesley Pattinama Kerkhove
5. (India) Ankita Raina
6. (United States) Katie Volynets
7. (United States) CoCo Vandeweghe
8. (United Kingdom) Tara Moore

=== Lucky losers ===
1. (Italy) Martina Di Giuseppe
2. (Russia) Marina Melnikova
3. (Spain) Georgina García Pérez

=== Draw ===
==== First qualifier ====
Qualifying competition
1	(Ukraine) Kateryna Kozlova	2	6	6
	(Serbia) Natalija Kostić	6	3	1

==== Second qualifier ====
Qualifying competition
Alt	(United Kingdom) Eden Silva	7^{7}	6
	(United Kingdom) Samantha Murray Sharan	6^{4}	2

==== Third qualifier ====
Qualifying competition
Alt	(United Kingdom) Sarah Beth Grey	6	5	7
WC	(United Kingdom) Emily Webley-Smith	3	7	5

==== Fourth qualifier ====
Qualifying competition
4	(Netherlands) Lesley Pattinama Kerkhove	6	6
	(United Kingdom) Naiktha Bains	2	4

==== Fifth qualifier ====
Qualifying competition
5	(India) Ankita Raina	7^{7}	6
	(Australia) Ellen Perez	6^{5}	4

==== Sixth qualifier ====
Qualifying competition
6	(Spain) Georgina García Pérez	4	3
	(United States) Katie Volynets	6	6

==== Seventh qualifier ====
Qualifying competition
7	(Russia) Marina Melnikova	6	3	2
	(United States) CoCo Vandeweghe	1	6	6

==== Eighth qualifier ====
Qualifying competition
8	(Italy) Martina Di Giuseppe	6	6^{7}	2
WC	(United Kingdom) Tara Moore	3	7^{9}	6
