= 2017 Nottingham Open – Women's doubles =

Women's doubles
- 2017 Nottingham Open

Final
- Champion: (Australia) Monique Adamczak (Australia) Storm Sanders
- Runner-up: (United Kingdom) Jocelyn Rae (United Kingdom) Laura Robson
- Score: 6–4, 4–6, [10–4]

Events
| Singles | men | women |
| Doubles | men | women |
| ← 2016 · | Nottingham Open | · 2018 → |

Andrea Hlaváčková and Peng Shuai were the defending champions, but Peng chose not to participate and Hlaváčková chose to compete in s'Hertogenbosch instead.

Monique Adamczak and Storm Sanders won the title, defeating Jocelyn Rae and Laura Robson in the final, 6–4, 4–6, [10–4].

== Seeds ==
1. (Canada) Gabriela Dabrowski / (Ukraine) Olga Savchuk (first round)
2. (Croatia) Darija Jurak / (Australia) Anastasia Rodionova (quarterfinals)
3. (Chinese Taipei) Chan Hao-ching / (Australia) Casey Dellacqua (quarterfinals)
4. (United States) Christina McHale / (United Kingdom) Heather Watson (semifinals)

== Draw ==
=== Key ===
- Q = Qualifier
- WC = Wild card
- LL = Lucky loser
- Alt = Alternate
- SE = Special exempt
- PR = Protected ranking
- ITF = ITF entry
- JE = Junior exempt
- w/o = Walkover
- r = Retired
- d = Defaulted
- SR = Special ranking

=== Draw ===
First round
1 | (Canada) G Dabrowski (Ukraine) O Savchuk | 5 | 1
(Australia) M Adamczak (Australia) S Sanders | 7 | 6
(Bulgaria) I Shinikova (United States) S Vickery | 2 | 4
(United States) J Boserup (United States) S Rogers | 6 | 6
3 | (Chinese Taipei) H-c Chan (Australia) C Dellacqua | 4 | 7^{7} | [10]
(United States) A Weinhold (United States) C Whoriskey | 6 | 6^{1} | [5]
(Chinese Taipei) C-j Chuang (Czech Republic) R Voráčová | 6 | 6^{5} | [5]
(United Kingdom) J Konta (Belgium) Y Wickmayer | 2 | 7^{7} | [10]
(United States) L Davis (United States) A Riske | 6 | 4 | [10]
(Russia) N Dzalamidze (Belarus) L Marozava | 1 | 6 | [6]
(Germany) M Barthel (Latvia) A Sevastova | 6^{4} | 6 | [8]
4 | (United States) C McHale (United Kingdom) H Watson | 7^{7} | 3 | [10]
Alt | (Chinese Taipei) S-w Hsieh (Poland) M Linette | 2 | 7^{7} | [9]
(United Kingdom) J Rae (United Kingdom) L Robson | 6 | 6^{4} | [11]
(Poland) K Kawa (Bosnia and Herzegovina) J Tinjić | 4 | 6^{3}
2 | (Croatia) D Jurak (Australia) An Rodionova | 6 | 7^{7}

Quarterfinals
(Australia) M Adamczak (Australia) S Sanders | 6^{4} | 7 | [10]
(United States) J Boserup (United States) S Rogers | 7^{7} | 5 | [5]
3 | (Chinese Taipei) H-c Chan (Australia) C Dellacqua | 0 | 6^{6}
(United Kingdom) J Konta (Belgium) Y Wickmayer | 6 | 7^{8}
(United States) L Davis (United States) A Riske | 1 | 0
4 | (United States) C McHale (United Kingdom) H Watson | 6 | 6
(United Kingdom) J Rae (United Kingdom) L Robson | 4 | 6 | [10]
2 | (Croatia) D Jurak (Australia) An Rodionova | 6 | 3 | [7]

Semifinals
(Australia) M Adamczak (Australia) S Sanders | 6 | 3 | [10]
(United Kingdom) J Konta (Belgium) Y Wickmayer | 1 | 6 | [6]
4 | (United States) C McHale (United Kingdom) H Watson | 3 | 6 | [6]
(United Kingdom) J Rae (United Kingdom) L Robson | 6 | 3 | [10]

Final
(Australia) M Adamczak (Australia) S Sanders | 6 | 4 | [10]
(United Kingdom) J Rae (United Kingdom) L Robson | 4 | 6 | [4]
