= 2022 Nottingham Open – Women's singles =

Women's singles
- 2022 Nottingham Open

Final
- Champion: (Brazil) Beatriz Haddad Maia
- Runner-up: (United States) Alison Riske
- Score: 6–4, 1–6, 6–3

Details
- Draw: 32 (6 Q / 4 WC )
- Seeds: 8

Events
Singles	men	women
Doubles	men	women
← 2021 ·	Nottingham Open	· 2023 →

Beatriz Haddad Maia defeated Alison Riske in the final, 6–4, 1–6, 6–3 to win the women's singles tennis title at the 2022 Nottingham Open. It was her first WTA Tour singles title, and she became the first Brazilian to win a WTA Tour title on grass since Maria Bueno in 1968.

Johanna Konta was the defending champion but she retired from professional tennis in December 2021.

== Seeds ==
1. (Greece) Maria Sakkari (quarterfinals)
2. (United Kingdom) Emma Raducanu (first round, retired)
3. (Italy) Camila Giorgi (second round)
4. (China) Zhang Shuai (quarterfinals)
5. (Australia) Ajla Tomljanović (quarterfinals)
6. (United States) Alison Riske (final)
7. (Brazil) Beatriz Haddad Maia (champion)
8. (Poland) Magda Linette (second round)

== Draw ==
=== Key ===
- Q = Qualifier
- WC = Wild card
- LL = Lucky loser
- Alt = Alternate
- SE = Special exempt
- PR = Protected ranking
- ITF = ITF entry
- JE = Junior exempt
- w/o = Walkover
- r = Retired
- d = Defaulted
- SR = Special ranking

=== Finals ===
Semifinals
7	(Brazil) Beatriz Haddad Maia	6	4
(Czech Republic) Tereza Martincová	3	1^{r}
6	(United States) Alison Riske	6	4	6
(Switzerland) Viktorija Golubic	3	6	3

Final
7	(Brazil) Beatriz Haddad Maia	6	1	6
6	(United States) Alison Riske	4	6	3

=== Top half ===
First round
1/WC	(Greece) M Sakkari	6	6
(Colombia) C Osorio	2	3
(Canada) R Marino	6	6
Q	(United Kingdom) E Silva	4	4
(Poland) M Fręch	4	6	1
Q	(United Kingdom) Y Miyazaki	6	1	6
(China) Q Wang	7	4	3
7	(Brazil) B Haddad Maia	5	6	6
4	(China) S Zhang	7^{7}	6
Q	(Spain) C Bucșa	6^{4}	3
(China) L Zhu	6^{5}	4
WC	(United Kingdom) J Burrage	7^{7}	6
(France) O Dodin	6^{1}	5
(Czech Republic) T Martincová	7^{7}	7
Q	(Poland) K Kawa	6^{4}	2
8	(Poland) M Linette	7^{7}	6

Second round
1/WC	(Greece) M Sakkari	1	6	6
(Canada) R Marino	6	3	3
Q	(United Kingdom) Y Miyazaki	2	6^{4}
7	(Brazil) B Haddad Maia	6	7^{7}
4	(China) S Zhang	6	7^{7}
WC	(United Kingdom) J Burrage	2	6^{4}
(Czech Republic) T Martincová	6	7^{7}
8	(Poland) M Linette	2	6^{3}

Quarterfinals
1/WC	(Greece) M Sakkari	4	6	3
7	(Brazil) B Haddad Maia	6	4	6
4	(China) S Zhang	3	2
(Czech Republic) T Martincová	6	6

Semifinals
7	(Brazil) B Haddad Maia	6	4
(Czech Republic) T Martincová	3	1^{r}

=== Bottom half ===
First round
6	(United States) A Riske	7	6
Q	(Ukraine) D Snigur	5	3
(United States) L Davis	3	6^{3}
(France) C Garcia	6	7^{7}
(Croatia) D Vekić	4	3
(United Kingdom) H Dart	6	6
WC	(United Kingdom) S Kartal	4	3
3	(Italy) C Giorgi	6	6
5	(Australia) A Tomljanović	6	6
(China) Xin Wang	4	4
Q	(United Kingdom) K Boulter	4	6	6
SR	(Germany) T Maria	6	1	4
(United Kingdom) H Watson	6	6
(United States) K Volynets	4	2
(Switzerland) V Golubic	4
2/WC	(United Kingdom) E Raducanu	3^{r}

Second round
6	(United States) A Riske	6	7
(France) C Garcia	4	5
(United Kingdom) H Dart	5	6	7^{7}
3	(Italy) C Giorgi	7	4	6^{3}
5	(Australia) A Tomljanović	6	6
Q	(United Kingdom) K Boulter	3	4
(United Kingdom) H Watson	5	2
(Switzerland) V Golubic	7	6

Quarterfinals
6	(United States) A Riske	4	6	6
(United Kingdom) H Dart	6	2	1
5	(Australia) A Tomljanović	2	6^{6}
(Switzerland) V Golubic	6	7^{8}

Semifinals
6	(United States) A Riske	6	4	6
(Switzerland) V Golubic	3	6	3

== Qualifying ==
=== Seeds ===
1. (Canada) Rebecca Marino (moved to main draw)
2. (Australia) Astra Sharma (qualifying competition)
3. (Australia) Maddison Inglis (qualifying competition)
4. (Poland) Katarzyna Kawa (qualified)
5. (Ukraine) Daria Snigur (qualified)
6. (Spain) Cristina Bucșa (qualified)
7. (United Kingdom) Katie Boulter (qualified)
8. (France) Tessah Andrianjafitrimo (qualifying competition)
9. (United States) Asia Muhammad (first round)
10. (Romania) Gabriela Lee (first round)
11. (United States) Caroline Dolehide (first round)
12. (United States) Emina Bektas (first round)

=== Qualifiers ===
1. (United Kingdom) Eden Silva
2. (United Kingdom) Yuriko Miyazaki
3. (United Kingdom) Katie Boulter
4. (Poland) Katarzyna Kawa
5. (Ukraine) Daria Snigur
6. (Spain) Cristina Bucșa

=== Draw ===
==== First qualifier ====
First round
Alt	(Indonesia) Aldila Sutjiadi	6^{1}	2
(United Kingdom) Sarah Beth Grey	7^{7}	6
(United Kingdom) Eden Silva	5	7^{7}	7
9	(United States) Asia Muhammad	7	6^{1}	5

Qualifying competition
(United Kingdom) Sarah Beth Grey	7	5	2
(United Kingdom) Eden Silva	5	7	6

==== Second qualifier ====
First round
2	(Australia) Astra Sharma	7	6
(Poland) Urszula Radwańska	5	1
(United Kingdom) Yuriko Miyazaki	6^{5}	6	6
10	(Romania) Gabriela Lee	7^{7}	4	2

Qualifying competition
2	(Australia) Astra Sharma	6	2	0
(United Kingdom) Yuriko Miyazaki	3	6	6

==== Third qualifier ====
First round
3	(Australia) Maddison Inglis	6	6
WC	(United Kingdom) Ella McDonald	2	1
(Chinese Taipei) Liang En-shuo	2	5
7	(United Kingdom) Katie Boulter	6	7

Qualifying competition
3	(Australia) Maddison Inglis	6	2	3
7	(United Kingdom) Katie Boulter	3	6	6

==== Fourth qualifier ====
First round
4	(Poland) Katarzyna Kawa	6	6
PR	(Australia) Kimberly Birrell	4	1
(Croatia) Jana Fett	6	6
11	(United States) Caroline Dolehide	2	4

Qualifying competition
4	(Poland) Katarzyna Kawa	7	4	6
(Croatia) Jana Fett	5	6	2

==== Fifth qualifier ====
First round
5	(Ukraine) Daria Snigur	6	6
WC	(United Kingdom) Freya Christie	4	1
(United States) Danielle Lao	7^{7}	2	6
12	(United States) Emina Bektas	6^{4}	6	1

Qualifying competition
5	(Ukraine) Daria Snigur	7^{7}	4	6
(United States) Danielle Lao	6^{5}	6	4

==== Sixth qualifier ====
First round
6	(Spain) Cristina Bucșa	6	5	6
(United Kingdom) Naiktha Bains	4	7	4
WC	(United Kingdom) Hephzibah Oluwadare	2	6	1
8	(France) Tessah Andrianjafitrimo	6	4	6

Qualifying competition
6	(Spain) Cristina Bucșa	6	6
8	(France) Tessah Andrianjafitrimo	3	2
