= 2018 Nottingham Open =

- Date: 11–17 June
- Edition: 11th (women); 23rd (men)
- Category: WTA International (women); ATP Challenger Tour (men)
- Draw: 32S / 16D
- Surface: Grass
- Location: Nottingham, United Kingdom
- Venue: Nottingham Tennis Centre

Champions

Men's singles
- (Australia) Alex de Minaur

Women's singles
- (Australia) Ashleigh Barty

Men's doubles
- (Denmark) Frederik Nielsen / (United Kingdom) Joe Salisbury

Women's doubles
- (Poland) Alicja Rosolska / (United States) Abigail Spears
| ← 2017 · | Nottingham Open | · 2019 → |

The 2018 Nottingham Open (also known as the Nature Valley Open for sponsorship purposes) was a professional tennis tournament played on outdoor grass courts in Nottingham, United Kingdom. It was the 11th edition of the event for women and the 23rd edition for men. It was classified as a WTA International tournament on the 2018 WTA Tour for the women, and as an ATP Challenger Tour event for the men. The event took place at the Nottingham Tennis Centre in Nottingham, United Kingdom from 11 through 17 June 2018.

== ATP singles main-draw entrants ==
=== Seeds ===
| Country | Player | Rank^{1} | Seed |
|---|---|---|---|
| GBR | Cameron Norrie | 85 | 1 |
| AUS | Alex de Minaur | 96 | 2 |
| ITA | Thomas Fabbiano | 115 | 3 |
| BLR | Ilya Ivashka | 119 | 4 |
| IND | Ramkumar Ramanathan | 121 | 5 |
| CAN | Peter Polansky | 124 | 6 |
| UKR | Sergiy Stakhovsky | 127 | 7 |
| USA | Michael Mmoh | 131 | 8 |

- ^{1} Rankings are as of 28 May 2018.

=== Other entrants ===
The following players received wildcards into the main draw:

- (United Kingdom) Jay Clarke
- (United Kingdom) George Loffhagen
- (United Kingdom) Alexander Ward
- (United Kingdom) James Ward

The following players received entry into the singles main draw as special exempts:

- (Australia) Alex de Minaur
- (United Kingdom) Dan Evans

The following player received entry into the singles main draw using a protected ranking:

- (Austria) Jürgen Melzer

The following players received entry from the qualifying draw:

- (Germany) Tobias Kamke
- (Denmark) Frederik Nielsen
- (Canada) Brayden Schnur
- (Germany) Tobias Simon

The following players received entry as lucky losers:

- (United States) Christopher Eubanks
- (Germany) Dominik Köpfer

== WTA singles main-draw entrants ==
=== Seeds ===
| Country | Player | Rank^{1} | Seed |
|---|---|---|---|
| AUS | Ashleigh Barty | 17 | 1 |
| SVK | Magdaléna Rybáriková | 18 | 2 |
| JPN | Naomi Osaka | 20 | 3 |
| GBR | Johanna Konta | 21 | 4 |
| ROU | Mihaela Buzărnescu | 33 | 5 |
| CRO | Donna Vekić | 50 | 6 |
| KAZ | Zarina Diyas | 51 | 7 |
| ITA | Camila Giorgi | 57 | 8 |

- ^{1} Rankings are as of 28 May 2018.

=== Other entrants ===
The following players received wildcards into the main draw:

- (United Kingdom) Katie Boulter
- (Australia) Samantha Stosur
- (United Kingdom) Gabriella Taylor

The following players received entry from the qualifying draw:

- (United States) Irina Falconi
- (United States) Danielle Lao
- (Romania) Elena-Gabriela Ruse
- (Russia) Valeria Savinykh
- (United Kingdom) Katie Swan
- (China) Zheng Saisai

=== Withdrawals ===
Before the tournament

- (United States) Catherine Bellis → replaced by (Japan) Kurumi Nara
- (Romania) Ana Bogdan → replaced by (China) Duan Yingying
- (United States) Madison Brengle → replaced by (Slovenia) Dalila Jakupović
- (United States) Christina McHale → replaced by (Belarus) Vera Lapko
- (Romania) Monica Niculescu → replaced by (United States) Kristie Ahn
- (Puerto Rico) Monica Puig → replaced by (Czech Republic) Denisa Allertová
- (Greece) Maria Sakkari → replaced by (Australia) Arina Rodionova

=== Retirements ===
- (Kazakhstan) Zarina Diyas

== WTA doubles main-draw entrants ==
=== Seeds ===
| Country | Player | Country | Player | Rank^{1} | Seed |
|---|---|---|---|---|---|
| UKR | Lyudmyla Kichenok | RUS | Alla Kudryavtseva | 78 | 1 |
| UKR | Nadiia Kichenok | AUS | Anastasia Rodionova | 85 | 2 |
| POL | Alicja Rosolska | USA | Abigail Spears | 89 | 3 |
| TPE | Chan Hao-ching | GBR | Laura Robson | 116 | 4 |

- ^{1} Rankings are as of 28 May 2018.

=== Other entrants ===
The following pair received a wildcard into the doubles main draw:

- (United Kingdom) Katie Boulter / (United Kingdom) Katie Swan

=== Withdrawals ===
During the tournament

- (Kazakhstan) Zarina Diyas
- (Croatia) Donna Vekić

== Champions ==
=== Men's singles ===
- (Australia) Alex de Minaur def. (United Kingdom) Dan Evans 7–6^{(7–4)}, 7–5.

=== Women's singles ===
- (Australia) Ashleigh Barty def. (United Kingdom) Johanna Konta, 6–3, 3–6, 6–4

=== Men's doubles ===
- (Denmark) Frederik Nielsen / (United Kingdom) Joe Salisbury def. (United States) Austin Krajicek / (India) Jeevan Nedunchezhiyan 7–6^{(7–5)}, 6–1.

=== Women's doubles ===
- (Poland) Alicja Rosolska / (United States) Abigail Spears def. (Romania) Mihaela Buzărnescu / (United Kingdom) Heather Watson, 6–3, 7–6^{(7–5)}
