= 2021 Nottingham Open – Women's doubles =

Women's doubles
- 2021 Nottingham Open

Final
- Champions: (Ukraine) Lyudmyla Kichenok (Japan) Makoto Ninomiya
- Runners-up: (United States) Caroline Dolehide (Australia) Storm Sanders
- Score: 6–4, 6–7^{(3–7)}, [10–8]

Events
Singles	men	women
Doubles	men	women
← 2019 ·	Nottingham Open	· 2022 →

Lyudmyla Kichenok and Makoto Ninomiya defeated Caroline Dolehide and Storm Sanders in the final, 6–4, 6–7^{(3–7)}, [10–8], to win the women's doubles tennis title at the 2021 Nottingham Open. Though it was their first title together as a team, it marked Kichenok's fifth career doubles title on the WTA Tour and Ninomiya's third.

Desirae Krawczyk and Giuliana Olmos were the defending champions from when the tournament was last held in 2019, but they did not return to compete.

== Seeds ==
1. (Australia) Ellen Perez / (China) Zhang Shuai (first round)
2. (United States) Caroline Dolehide / (Australia) Storm Sanders (final)
3. (Ukraine) Lyudmyla Kichenok / (Japan) Makoto Ninomiya (champions)
4. (United States) Kaitlyn Christian / (Japan) Nao Hibino (quarterfinals, withdrew)

== Draw ==
=== Key ===
- Q = Qualifier
- WC = Wild card
- LL = Lucky loser
- Alt = Alternate
- SE = Special exempt
- PR = Protected ranking
- ITF = ITF entry
- JE = Junior exempt
- w/o = Walkover
- r = Retired
- d = Defaulted
- SR = Special ranking

=== Draw ===
First round
1	(Australia) E Perez (China) S Zhang	4	6^{3}
(Netherlands) L Pattinama Kerkhove (United States) S Santamaria	6	7^{7}
(United Kingdom) J Konta (Croatia) D Vekić	6^{3}	6	[11]
(France) E Lechemia (United States) I Neel	7^{7}	2	[9]
3	(Ukraine) L Kichenok (Japan) M Ninomiya	7	7^{7}
PR	(United States) C McHale (United States) C Vandeweghe	5	6^{1}
(United Kingdom) SB Grey (United Kingdom) E Webley-Smith	2	7	[10]
WC	(United Kingdom) K Boulter (United Kingdom) J Burrage	6	5	[3]
(India) A Raina (Germany) J Wachaczyk	6	2	[10]
(United Kingdom) N Bains (United Kingdom) S Murray Sharan	4	6	[4]
WC	(United Kingdom) N Broady (United Kingdom) H Dart	6	5	[7]
4	(United States) K Christian (Japan) N Hibino	3	7	[10]
(Czech Republic) T Martincová (France) K Mladenovic	6	4	[9]
(United Kingdom) T Moore (United Kingdom) E Silva	2	6	[11]
Alt	(Czech Republic) M Bouzková (Poland) A Rosolska	6^{3}	4
2	(United States) C Dolehide (Australia) S Sanders	7^{7}	6

Quarterfinals
(Netherlands) L Pattinama Kerkhove (United States) S Santamaria	3	1
(United Kingdom) J Konta (Croatia) D Vekić	6	6
3	(Ukraine) L Kichenok (Japan) M Ninomiya	6	1
(United Kingdom) SB Grey (United Kingdom) E Webley-Smith	1	0^{r}
(India) A Raina (Germany) J Wachaczyk	w/o
4	(United States) K Christian (Japan) N Hibino
(United Kingdom) T Moore (United Kingdom) E Silva	4	2
2	(United States) C Dolehide (Australia) S Sanders	6	6

Semifinals
(United Kingdom) J Konta (Croatia) D Vekić
3	(Ukraine) L Kichenok (Japan) M Ninomiya	w/o
(India) A Raina (Germany) J Wachaczyk	4	6^{3}
2	(United States) C Dolehide (Australia) S Sanders	6	7^{7}

Final
3	(Ukraine) L Kichenok (Japan) M Ninomiya	6	6^{3}	[10]
2	(United States) C Dolehide (Australia) S Sanders	4	7^{7}	[8]
