= 2021 Nottingham Open =

- Date: 6–13 June
- Edition: 13th (women); 25th (men)
- Category: WTA 250 (women); ATP Challenger Tour (men)
- Draw: 48S / 16D (women); 32S / 16D (men)
- Surface: Grass
- Location: Nottingham, United Kingdom
- Venue: Nottingham Tennis Centre

Champions

Men's singles
- (United States) Frances Tiafoe

Women's singles
- (United Kingdom) Johanna Konta

Men's doubles
- (Australia) Matt Reid / (United Kingdom) Ken Skupski

Women's doubles
- (Ukraine) Lyudmyla Kichenok / (Japan) Makoto Ninomiya
← 2019 ·	Nottingham Open	· 2022 →

The 2021 Nottingham Open (also known as the Viking Open Nottingham for sponsorship purposes) was a professional tennis tournament played on outdoor grass courts. It was the 13th edition of the event for women and the 25th edition for men. It was classified as a WTA 250 on the 2021 WTA Tour for the women, and as an ATP Challenger Tour event for the men. The event took place at the Nottingham Tennis Centre in Nottingham, United Kingdom from 6 through 13 June 2021.

== Champions ==
=== Men's singles ===
- (United States) Frances Tiafoe def. (United States) Denis Kudla 6–1, 6–3.

=== Women's singles ===
- (United Kingdom) Johanna Konta def. (China) Zhang Shuai 6–2, 6–1

=== Men's doubles ===
- (Australia) Matt Reid / (United Kingdom) Ken Skupski def. (Australia) Matthew Ebden / (Australia) John-Patrick Smith 4–6, 7–5, [10–6].

=== Women's doubles ===
- (Ukraine) Lyudmyla Kichenok / (Japan) Makoto Ninomiya def. (United States) Caroline Dolehide / (Australia) Storm Sanders, 6–4, 6–7^{(3–7)}, [10–8]

== ATP singles main-draw entrants ==
=== Seeds ===
Country	Player	Rank^{1}	Seed
GBR	Dan Evans	27	1
USA	Frances Tiafoe	74	2
ITA	Andreas Seppi	98	3
RSA	Kevin Anderson	100	4
USA	Mackenzie McDonald	119	5
USA	Denis Kudla	120	6
BIH	Damir Džumhur	125	7
POL	Kamil Majchrzak	126	8

- ^{1} Rankings are as of 31 May 2021.

=== Other entrants ===
The following players received wildcards into the main draw:

- (United Kingdom) Jay Clarke
- (United Kingdom) Dan Evans
- (United Kingdom) Ryan Peniston

The following players received entry from the qualifying draw:

- (Romania) Marius Copil
- (Australia) Matthew Ebden
- (Croatia) Borna Gojo
- (Australia) Aleksandar Vukic

== WTA singles main-draw entrants ==
=== Seeds ===
Country	Player	Rank^{1}	Seed
GBR	Johanna Konta	20	1
USA	Alison Riske	28	2
CRO	Donna Vekić	36	3
CHN	Zhang Shuai	48	4
~~USA~~	~~Danielle Collins~~	~~50~~	~~5~~
CZE	Marie Bouzková	52	6
FRA	Kristina Mladenovic	61	7
BEL	Alison Van Uytvanck	67	8
GBR	Heather Watson	71	9
SUI	Viktorija Golubic	72	10
~~ITA~~	~~Camila Giorgi~~	~~80~~	~~11~~
JPN	Nao Hibino	82	12
USA	Madison Brengle	84	13
USA	Lauren Davis	86	14
SRB	Nina Stojanović	87	15
KAZ	Zarina Diyas	93	16
CZE	Tereza Martincová	94	17
USA	Christina McHale	95	18

- ^{1} Rankings are as of 31 May 2021.

=== Other entrants ===
The following players received wildcards into the main draw:

- (United Kingdom) Katie Boulter
- (United Kingdom) Jodie Burrage
- (United Kingdom) Francesca Jones
- (United Kingdom) Emma Raducanu

The following players received entry from the qualifying draw:

- (United Kingdom) Sarah Beth Grey
- (Ukraine) Kateryna Kozlova
- (United Kingdom) Tara Moore
- (Netherlands) Lesley Pattinama Kerkhove
- (India) Ankita Raina
- (United Kingdom) Eden Silva
- (United States) CoCo Vandeweghe
- (United States) Katie Volynets

The following players received entry as lucky losers:

- (Italy) Martina Di Giuseppe
- (Spain) Georgina García Pérez
- (Russia) Marina Melnikova

=== Withdrawals ===
Before the tournament

- (Spain) Paula Badosa → replaced by (Japan) Kurumi Nara
- (Switzerland) Belinda Bencic → replaced by (United States) Caty McNally
- (United States) Danielle Collins → replaced by (Russia) Marina Melnikova
- (Japan) Misaki Doi → replaced by (United States) Kristie Ahn
- (Italy) Camila Giorgi → replaced by (Italy) Martina Di Giuseppe
- (Slovenia) Polona Hercog → replaced by (Spain) Georgina García Pérez
- (Chinese Taipei) Hsieh Su-wei → replaced by (Australia) Arina Rodionova
- (Ukraine) Marta Kostyuk → replaced by (China) Wang Yafan
- (United States) Ann Li → replaced by (Bulgaria) Viktoriya Tomova
- (Poland) Magda Linette → replaced by (Colombia) Camila Osorio
- (United States) Jessica Pegula → replaced by (China) Wang Xiyu
- (Czech Republic) Kristýna Plíšková → replaced by (Australia) Maddison Inglis
- (Kazakhstan) Yulia Putintseva → replaced by (United Kingdom) Harriet Dart
- (United States) Shelby Rogers → replaced by (Australia) Lizette Cabrera
- (Kazakhstan) Elena Rybakina → replaced by (France) Océane Dodin
- (Denmark) Clara Tauson → replaced by (Kazakhstan) Zarina Diyas
- (Australia) Ajla Tomljanović → replaced by (China) Wang Xinyu
- (United States) Venus Williams → replaced by (Italy) Giulia Gatto-Monticone
- (China) Wang Qiang → replaced by (Russia) Anastasia Gasanova
- (China) Zheng Saisai → replaced by (Switzerland) Leonie Küng

=== Retirements ===
- (United States) Kristie Ahn

== WTA doubles main-draw entrants ==
=== Seeds ===
Country	Player	Country	Player	Rank^{1}	Seed
AUS	Ellen Perez	CHN	Zhang Shuai	92	1
USA	Caroline Dolehide	AUS	Storm Sanders	106	2
UKR	Lyudmyla Kichenok	JPN	Makoto Ninomiya	109	3
USA	Kaitlyn Christian	JPN	Nao Hibino	126	4

- ^{1} Rankings are as of 31 May 2021.

=== Other entrants ===
The following pairs received wildcards into the doubles main draw:

- (United Kingdom) Katie Boulter / (United Kingdom) Jodie Burrage
- (United Kingdom) Naomi Broady / (United Kingdom) Harriet Dart

The following pair received entry using a protected ranking:

- (United States) Christina McHale / (United States) CoCo Vandeweghe

The following pair received entry as an alternate:

- (Czech Republic) Marie Bouzková / (Poland) Alicja Rosolska

=== Withdrawals ===
Before the tournament

- (United States) Lauren Davis / (United States) Caty McNally → replaced by (Czech Republic) Marie Bouzková / (Poland) Alicja Rosolska
- (Canada) Sharon Fichman / (Mexico) Giuliana Olmos → replaced by (France) Elixane Lechemia / (United States) Ingrid Neel
- (Germany) Vivian Heisen / (Czech Republic) Květa Peschke → replaced by (United Kingdom) Tara Moore / (United Kingdom) Eden Silva
- (Slovenia) Dalila Jakupović / (Russia) Yana Sizikova → replaced by (United Kingdom) Sarah Beth Grey / (United Kingdom) Emily Webley-Smith
- (Australia) Ellen Perez / (United States) Danielle Collins → replaced by (United Kingdom) Naiktha Bains / (United Kingdom) Samantha Murray Sharan
- (China) Xu Yifan / (China) Zhang Shuai → replaced by (Australia) Ellen Perez / (China) Zhang Shuai

During the tournament

- (United States) Kaitlyn Christian / (Japan) Nao Hibino
- (United Kingdom) Johanna Konta / (Croatia) Donna Vekić
