= 2019 Nottingham Open – Men's doubles =

Men's doubles
- 2019 Nottingham Open

Final
- Champions: (Mexico) Santiago González (Pakistan) Aisam-ul-Haq Qureshi
- Runners-up: (China) Gong Maoxin (China) Zhang Ze
- Score: 4–6, 7–6^{(7–5)}, [10–5]

Events
Singles	men	women
Doubles	men	women
← 2018 ·	Nottingham Open	· 2021 →

Frederik Nielsen and Joe Salisbury were the defending champions but chose not to defend their title.

Santiago González and Aisam-ul-Haq Qureshi won the title after defeating Gong Maoxin and Zhang Ze 4–6, 7–6^{(7–5)}, [10–5] in the final.

== Seeds ==
1. (Mexico) Santiago González / (Pakistan) Aisam-ul-Haq Qureshi (champions)
2. (Chinese Taipei) Hsieh Cheng-peng / (Indonesia) Christopher Rungkat (first round)
3. (United Kingdom) Ken Skupski / (Australia) John-Patrick Smith (semifinals)
4. (India) Jeevan Nedunchezhiyan / (India) Purav Raja (quarterfinals)

== Draw ==
=== Key ===
- Q = Qualifier
- WC = Wild card
- LL = Lucky loser
- Alt = Alternate
- SE = Special exempt
- PR = Protected ranking
- ITF = ITF entry
- JE = Junior exempt
- w/o = Walkover
- r = Retired
- d = Defaulted
- SR = Special ranking

First round
1	(Mexico) S González (Pakistan) A-u-H Qureshi	6	7^{8}
(Japan) T Ito (Chinese Taipei) J Jung	3	6^{6}
(Canada) P Polansky (Czech Republic) L Rosol
(Russia) E Donskoy (Poland) K Majchrzak	w/o
4	(India) J Nedunchezhiyan (India) P Raja	w/o
WC	(United Kingdom) D Evans (United Kingdom) L Glasspool
WC	(United Kingdom) E Hoyt (United Kingdom) L Johnson	4	6	[8]
(India) S Balaji (United States) J Cerretani	6	4	[10]
(United States) N Monroe (Australia) L Saville	2	6	[10]
(Austria) D Novak (Austria) S Ofner	6	4	[8]
(Australia) R Junaid (India) L Paes	4	6^{4}
3	(United Kingdom) K Skupski (Australia) J-P Smith	6	7^{7}
PR	(Israel) J Erlich (Philippines) T Huey	4	6	[4]
(China) M Gong (China) Ze Zhang	6	1	[10]
WC	(United Kingdom) L Broady (United Kingdom) S Clayton	7^{7}	4	[10]
2	(Chinese Taipei) C-p Hsieh (Indonesia) C Rungkat	6^{1}	6	[6]

Quarterfinals
1	(Mexico) S González (Pakistan) A-u-H Qureshi	w/o
(Russia) E Donskoy (Poland) K Majchrzak
4	(India) J Nedunchezhiyan (India) P Raja	6	3	[7]
(India) S Balaji (United States) J Cerretani	3	6	[10]
(United States) N Monroe (Australia) L Saville	6	6^{5}	[6]
3	(United Kingdom) K Skupski (Australia) J-P Smith	4	7^{7}	[10]
(China) M Gong (China) Ze Zhang	6	1	[11]
WC	(United Kingdom) L Broady (United Kingdom) S Clayton	2	6	[9]

Semifinals
1	(Mexico) S González (Pakistan) A-u-H Qureshi	4	6	[10]
(India) S Balaji (United States) J Cerretani	6	1	[7]
3	(United Kingdom) K Skupski (Australia) J-P Smith	2	4
(China) M Gong (China) Ze Zhang	6	6

Final
1	(Mexico) S González (Pakistan) A-u-H Qureshi	4	7^{7}	[10]
(China) M Gong (China) Ze Zhang	6	6^{5}	[5]
