= 2021 Nottingham Open – Men's singles =

Men's singles
- 2021 Nottingham Open

Final
- Champion: (United States) Frances Tiafoe
- Runner-up: (United States) Denis Kudla
- Score: 6–1, 6–3

Details
- Draw: 32
- Seeds: 8

Events
Singles	men	women
Doubles	men	women
- Nottingham Open

Dan Evans was the defending champion but lost in the quarterfinals to Denis Kudla.

Frances Tiafoe won the title after defeating Kudla 6–1, 6–3 in the final.

== Seeds ==
1. (United Kingdom) Dan Evans (quarterfinals)
2. (United States) Frances Tiafoe (champion)
3. (Italy) Andreas Seppi (quarterfinals)
4. (South Africa) Kevin Anderson (quarterfinals)
5. (United States) Mackenzie McDonald (first round)
6. (United States) Denis Kudla (final)
7. (Bosnia and Herzegovina) Damir Džumhur (first round)
8. (Poland) Kamil Majchrzak (semifinals)

== Draw ==
Key

- Q = Qualifier
- WC = Wild card
- LL = Lucky loser
- Alt = Alternate
- ITF = ITF entry
- PR = Protected ranking
- SR = Special ranking
- SE = Special exempt
- JE = Junior exempt
- JR = Junior Accelerator Programme entrant
- CO = College Accelerator Programme entrant
- NG = Next Gen Accelerator Program entrant
- w/o = Walkover
- r = Retired
- d = Defaulted

=== Finals ===
Semifinals
6	(United States) Denis Kudla	6	1	7^{8}
8	(Poland) Kamil Majchrzak	4	6	6^{6}
Q	(Romania) Marius Copil	3	2
2	(United States) Frances Tiafoe	6	6

Final
6	(United States) Denis Kudla	1	3
2	(United States) Frances Tiafoe	6	6

=== Top half ===
First round
1/WC	(United Kingdom) D Evans	4	7^{7}	7^{7}
(Australia) T Kokkinakis	6	6^{1}	6^{5}
Q	(Australia) M Ebden	6	6
WC	(United Kingdom) R Peniston	4	4
(Australia) A Bolt	5	6	3
(United Kingdom) L Broady	7	3	6
(Czech Republic) T Macháč	3	6	4
6	(United States) D Kudla	6	4	6
3	(Italy) A Seppi	7^{7}	6
(China) Zh Zhang	6^{4}	2
(Italy) T Fabbiano	6^{5}	6^{3}
(France) A Hoang	7^{7}	7^{7}
(Australia) M Polmans	6^{10}	6	3
Q	(Australia) A Vukic	7^{12}	4	6
(India) P Gunneswaran	0	0^{r}
8	(Poland) K Majchrzak	6	0

Second round
1/WC	(United Kingdom) D Evans	7^{8}	7^{7}
Q	(Australia) M Ebden	6^{6}	6^{4}
(United Kingdom) L Broady	6	3	6^{2}
6	(United States) D Kudla	3	6	7^{7}
3	(Italy) A Seppi	6	6^{4}	6
(France) A Hoang	4	7^{7}	2
Q	(Australia) A Vukic	7	6^{10}	4
8	(Poland) K Majchrzak	5	7^{12}	6

Quarterfinals
1/WC	(United Kingdom) D Evans	4	6	4
6	(United States) D Kudla	6	1	6
3	(Italy) A Seppi	6	2	3
8	(Poland) K Majchrzak	4	6	6

Semifinals
6	(United States) D Kudla	6	1	7^{8}
8	(Poland) K Majchrzak	4	6	6^{6}

=== Bottom half ===
First round
7	(Bosnia and Herzegovina) D Džumhur	4	6	1
Q	(Romania) M Copil	6	4	6
Q	(Croatia) B Gojo	3	7^{12}	6^{6}
(Austria) S Ofner	6	6^{10}	7^{8}
(United States) M Cressy	4	7^{7}	3
(Czech Republic) L Rosol	6	6^{5}	6
WC	(United Kingdom) J Clarke	3	6^{0}
4	(South Africa) K Anderson	6	7^{7}
5	(United States) M McDonald	3	5
(Russia) E Donskoy	6	7
(United States) B Nakashima	6	6
(Spain) M Vilella Martínez	3	2
(Italy) F Gaio	2	3
(Ukraine) I Marchenko	6	6
(Switzerland) M-A Hüsler	3	4
2	(United States) F Tiafoe	6	6

Second round
Q	(Romania) M Copil	6	6
(Austria) S Ofner	4	4
(Czech Republic) L Rosol	3	4
4	(South Africa) K Anderson	6	6
(Russia) E Donskoy	7^{7}	7^{7}
(United States) B Nakashima	6^{3}	6^{2}
(Ukraine) I Marchenko	5	6^{5}
2	(United States) F Tiafoe	7	7^{7}

Quarterfinals
Q	(Romania) M Copil	7^{7}	7^{11}
4	(South Africa) K Anderson	6^{4}	6^{9}
(Russia) E Donskoy	6^{4}	6	3
2	(United States) F Tiafoe	7^{7}	2	6

Semifinals
Q	(Romania) M Copil	3	2
2	(United States) F Tiafoe	6	6
