= 2022 Nottingham Open – Men's singles =

Men's singles
- 2022 Nottingham Open

Final
- Champion: (United Kingdom) Dan Evans
- Runner-up: (Australia) Jordan Thompson
- Score: 6–4, 6–4

Details
- Draw: 32
- Seeds: 8

Events
Singles	men	women
Doubles	men	women
- Nottingham Open

Frances Tiafoe was the defending champion but chose not to defend his title.

Dan Evans won the title, defeating Jordan Thompson 6–4, 6–4 in the final.

== Seeds ==
1. (United Kingdom) Dan Evans (champion)
2. (Czech Republic) Jiří Veselý (first round)
3. (Australia) Jordan Thompson (final)
4. (Australia) John Millman (first round)
5. (Australia) Alexei Popyrin (semifinals)
6. (Spain) Fernando Verdasco (second round)
7. (United States) Jack Sock (semifinals)
8. (Switzerland) Marc-Andrea Hüsler (quarterfinals)

== Draw ==
Key

- Q = Qualifier
- WC = Wild card
- LL = Lucky loser
- Alt = Alternate
- ITF = ITF entry
- PR = Protected ranking
- SR = Special ranking
- SE = Special exempt
- JE = Junior exempt
- JR = Junior Accelerator Programme entrant
- CO = College Accelerator Programme entrant
- NG = Next Gen Accelerator Program entrant
- w/o = Walkover
- r = Retired
- d = Defaulted

=== Finals ===
Semifinals
1/WC	(United Kingdom) Dan Evans	7	6
7	(United States) Jack Sock	5	3
3/SE	(Australia) Jordan Thompson	6	6
5	(Australia) Alexei Popyrin	4	2

Final
1/WC	(United Kingdom) Dan Evans	6	6
3/SE	(Australia) Jordan Thompson	4	4

=== Top half ===
First round
1/WC	(United Kingdom) D Evans	7	7^{7}
(France) E Couacaud	5	6^{3}
Alt	(Croatia) D Ajduković	6	6^{3}	4
(Italy) T Fabbiano	4	7^{7}	6
(Italy) F Gaio	6	4	3
Q	(United Kingdom) D Cox	2	6	6
(United States) E Escobedo	4	4
8	(Switzerland) M-A Hüsler	6	6
4	(Australia) J Millman	6^{5}	3
Q	(Finland) O Virtanen	7^{7}	6
(United Kingdom) L Broady	6	4	6
(France) C Lestienne	4	6	3
(India) R Ramanathan	6^{3}	5
(France) G Blancaneaux	7^{7}	7
Q	(Germany) H Squire	2	6^{7}
7	(United States) J Sock	6	7^{9}

Second round
1/WC	(United Kingdom) D Evans	7	6
(Italy) T Fabbiano	5	0
Q	(United Kingdom) D Cox	2	6	2
8	(Switzerland) M-A Hüsler	6	4	6
Q	(Finland) O Virtanen	6	5	2
(United Kingdom) L Broady	2	7	6
(France) G Blancaneaux	0	6	2
7	(United States) J Sock	6	4	6

Quarterfinals
1/WC	(United Kingdom) D Evans	6	6
8	(Switzerland) M-A Hüsler	4	4
(United Kingdom) L Broady	6^{3}	6	4
7	(United States) J Sock	7^{7}	1	6

Semifinals
1/WC	(United Kingdom) D Evans	7	6
7	(United States) J Sock	5	3

=== Bottom half ===
First round
6	(Spain) F Verdasco	7^{7}	7^{8}
WC	(United Kingdom) A Gray	6^{3}	6^{6}
Q	(Romania) M Copil	4	4
(Kazakhstan) M Kukushkin	6	6
WC	(United Kingdom) P Jubb	3	2
(United Kingdom) J Clarke	6	6
Q	(Switzerland) A Bellier	3	4
3/SE	(Australia) J Thompson	6	6
5	(Australia) A Popyrin	6	6
(Slovakia) L Lacko	4	2
(France) A Escoffier	5	6	6
(France) L Pouille	7	4	4
(Croatia) B Gojo	6	7^{7}
Q	(Chinese Taipei) J Jung	2	6^{3}
(United Kingdom) R Peniston	6^{7}	7^{7}	7^{8}
2	(Czech Republic) J Veselý	7^{9}	6^{5}	6^{6}

Second round
6	(Spain) F Verdasco	3	7^{7}	4
(Kazakhstan) M Kukushkin	6	6^{2}	6
(United Kingdom) J Clarke	4	4
3/SE	(Australia) J Thompson	6	6
5	(Australia) A Popyrin	6	7
(France) A Escoffier	3	5
(Croatia) B Gojo	4	6^{4}
(United Kingdom) R Peniston	6	7^{7}

Quarterfinals
(Kazakhstan) M Kukushkin	2	6	3
3/SE	(Australia) J Thompson	6	4	6
5	(Australia) A Popyrin	6	6
(United Kingdom) R Peniston	3	4

Semifinals
3/SE	(Australia) J Thompson	6	6
5	(Australia) A Popyrin	4	2
