= 2017 Nottingham Open – Men's doubles =

Men's doubles
- 2017 Nottingham Open

Final
- Champion: (United Kingdom) Ken Skupski (United Kingdom) Neal Skupski
- Runner-up: (Australia) Matt Reid (Australia) John-Patrick Smith
- Score: 7–6^{(7–1)}, 2–6, [10–7]

Events
Singles	men	women
Doubles	men	women
- Nottingham Open

This was the first edition of the tournament at the Challenger level.

Ken Skupski and Neal Skupski won the title after defeating Matt Reid and John-Patrick Smith 7–6^{(7–1)}, 2–6, [10–7] in the final.

== Seeds ==
1. (Austria) Julian Knowle / (Austria) Philipp Oswald (first round)
2. (Australia) Matt Reid / (Australia) John-Patrick Smith (final)
3. (Australia) Marc Polmans / (Australia) Andrew Whittington (first round)
4. (Thailand) Sanchai Ratiwatana / (Thailand) Sonchat Ratiwatana (first round)

== Draw ==
Key

- Q = Qualifier
- WC = Wild card
- LL = Lucky loser
- Alt = Alternate
- ITF = ITF entry
- PR = Protected ranking
- SR = Special ranking
- SE = Special exempt
- JE = Junior exempt
- JR = Junior Accelerator Programme entrant
- CO = College Accelerator Programme entrant
- NG = Next Gen Accelerator Program entrant
- w/o = Walkover
- r = Retired
- d = Defaulted

First round
1	(Austria) J Knowle (Austria) P Oswald	6^{6}	7^{9}	[3]
PR	(India) Y Bhambri (Israel) D Sela	7^{8}	6^{7}	[10]
WC	(United Kingdom) B Klein (United Kingdom) J Salisbury	6	7^{7}
(India) J Nedunchezhiyan (Australia) L Saville	1	6^{5}
4	(Thailand) Sa Ratiwatana (Thailand) So Ratiwatana	3	6	[13]
(United Kingdom) K Skupski (United Kingdom) N Skupski	6	3	[15]
(Sweden) J Brunström (United States) R Opelka	7	6
(Italy) T Fabbiano (Italy) L Vanni	5	4
(Romania) M Copil (Ukraine) S Stakhovsky	7^{7}	4	[10]
WC	(United Kingdom) S Clayton (United Kingdom) J O'Mara	6^{3}	6	[7]
(Russia) K Kravchuk (Ukraine) I Marchenko	6	3	[10]
3	(Australia) M Polmans (Australia) A Whittington	4	6	[7]
(Australia) S Groth (Australia) J Millman	6	6
WC	(United Kingdom) L Bambridge (United Kingdom) C Norrie	0	1
PR	(Australia) M Ebden (Japan) G Soeda	3	2
2	(Australia) M Reid (Australia) J-P Smith	6	6

Quarterfinals
PR	(India) Y Bhambri (Israel) D Sela	3	6	[6]
WC	(United Kingdom) B Klein (United Kingdom) J Salisbury	6	3	[10]
(United Kingdom) K Skupski (United Kingdom) N Skupski	6	7
(Sweden) J Brunström (United States) R Opelka	3	5
(Romania) M Copil (Ukraine) S Stakhovsky	6^{10}	6^{5}
(Russia) K Kravchuk (Ukraine) I Marchenko	7^{12}	7^{7}
(Australia) S Groth (Australia) J Millman	7^{7}	3	[5]
2	(Australia) M Reid (Australia) J-P Smith	6^{4}	6	[10]

Semifinals
WC	(United Kingdom) B Klein (United Kingdom) J Salisbury	5	4
(United Kingdom) K Skupski (United Kingdom) N Skupski	7	6
(Russia) K Kravchuk (Ukraine) I Marchenko	7^{7}	6^{5}	[3]
2	(Australia) M Reid (Australia) J-P Smith	6^{5}	7^{7}	[10]

Final
(United Kingdom) K Skupski (United Kingdom) N Skupski	7^{7}	2	[10]
2	(Australia) M Reid (Australia) J-P Smith	6^{1}	6	[7]
