= 2011 Nottingham Challenge – Women's doubles =

Women's doubles
- 2011 Nottingham Challenge

Final
- Champion: (Czech Republic) Eva Birnerová (Czech Republic) Petra Cetkovská
- Runner-up: (Russia) Regina Kulikova (Russia) Evgeniya Rodina
- Score: 6–3, 6–2

Events
Singles	men	women
Doubles	men	women
← 2010 ·	Nottingham Challenge	· 2012 →

This was the first edition of this tournament.

Eva Birnerová and Petra Cetkovská won the tournament defeating Regina Kulikova and Evgeniya Rodina 6–3, 6–2.

== Seeds ==
1. (Czech Republic) Lucie Hradecká / (Czech Republic) Renata Voráčová (quarterfinals, withdrew)
2. (Russia) Maria Kondratieva / (France) Sophie Lefèvre (first round)
3. (Romania) Monica Niculescu / (Thailand) Tamarine Tanasugarn (quarterfinals)
4. (Zimbabwe) Cara Black / (United Kingdom) Sarah Borwell (quarterfinals)

== Draw ==
=== Key ===
- Q = Qualifier
- WC = Wild card
- LL = Lucky loser
- Alt = Alternate
- SE = Special exempt
- PR = Protected ranking
- ITF = ITF entry
- JE = Junior exempt
- w/o = Walkover
- r = Retired
- d = Defaulted
- SR = Special ranking

=== Draw ===
First round
1	(Czech Republic) L Hradecká (Czech Republic) R Voráčová	7^{7}	2	[10]
(Canada) S Dubois (Luxembourg) A Kremer	6^{3}	6	[6]
(China) J Lu (Ukraine) T Luzhanska	0	2
(Czech Republic) E Birnerová (Czech Republic) P Cetkovská	6	6
3	(Romania) M Niculescu (Thailand) T Tanasugarn	6	6
(France) I Brémond (France) S Foretz Gacon	3	2
(Romania) E Bogdan (Russia) V Savinykh	6	6
(Austria) Y Meusburger (Switzerland) S Vögele	2	2
(Australia) D Dominikovic (Australia) S Peers	6	7
(Hungary) M Czink (South Africa) S de Beer	4	5
(United Kingdom) A Fitzpatrick (United Kingdom) K O'Brien	3	1
4	(Zimbabwe) C Black (United Kingdom) S Borwell	6	6
(Russia) R Kulikova (Russia) E Rodina	4	6	[10]
(United States) M Brengle (Ukraine) L Tsurenko	6	4	[4]
(United Kingdom) A Keothavong (United Kingdom) L Robson	3	6	[10]
2	(Russia) M Kondratieva (France) S Lefèvre	6	2	[6]

Quarterfinals
1	(Czech Republic) L Hradecká (Czech Republic) R Voráčová
(Czech Republic) E Birnerová (Czech Republic) P Cetkovská	w/o
3	(Romania) M Niculescu (Thailand) T Tanasugarn	2	2
(Romania) E Bogdan (Russia) V Savinykh	6	6
(Australia) D Dominikovic (Australia) S Peers	7^{7}	6
4	(Zimbabwe) C Black (United Kingdom) S Borwell	6^{4}	0
(Russia) R Kulikova (Russia) E Rodina	w/o
(United Kingdom) A Keothavong (United Kingdom) L Robson

Semifinals
(Czech Republic) E Birnerová (Czech Republic) P Cetkovská	6	6
(Romania) E Bogdan (Russia) V Savinykh	4	1
(Australia) D Dominikovic (Australia) S Peers	2	6^{4}
(Russia) R Kulikova (Russia) E Rodina	6	7^{7}

Final
(Czech Republic) E Birnerová (Czech Republic) P Cetkovská	6	6
(Russia) R Kulikova (Russia) E Rodina	3	2
