= 2011 Nottingham Challenge – Women's singles =

Women's singles
- 2011 Nottingham Challenge

Final
- Champion: (United Kingdom) Elena Baltacha
- Runner-up: (Czech Republic) Petra Cetkovská
- Score: 7–5, 6–3

Events
Singles	men	women
Doubles	men	women
← 2010 ·	Nottingham Challenge	· 2012 →

This was the first edition of the tournament.

Elena Baltacha won the final defeating Petra Cetkovská 7–5, 6–3.

== Seeds ==
1. (Romania) Monica Niculescu (quarterfinals)
2. (Czech Republic) Lucie Hradecká (quarterfinals)
3. (France) Mathilde Johansson (quarterfinals)
4. (Russia) Evgeniya Rodina (quarterfinals)
5. (United Kingdom) Elena Baltacha (champion)
6. (Czech Republic) Petra Cetkovská (final)
7. (United Kingdom) Anne Keothavong (second round)
8. (Thailand) Tamarine Tanasugarn (semifinals)

== Draw ==
=== Key ===
- Q = Qualifier
- WC = Wild card
- LL = Lucky loser
- Alt = Alternate
- ITF = ITF entry
- PR = Protected ranking
- SR = Special ranking
- SE = Special exempt
- JE = Junior exempt
- JR = Junior Accelerator Programme entrant
- CO = College Accelerator Programme entrant
- NG = Next Gen Accelerator Program entrant
- w/o = Walkover
- r = Retired
- d = Defaulted

=== Finals ===
Semifinals
6	(Czech Republic) Petra Cetkovská	6	6
8	(Thailand) Tamarine Tanasugarn	3	3
(Canada) Stéphanie Dubois	2	2
5	(United Kingdom) Elena Baltacha	6	6

Final
6	(Czech Republic) Petra Cetkovská	5	3
5	(United Kingdom) Elena Baltacha	7	6

=== Top half ===
First round
1	(Romania) M Niculescu	6	6
(Switzerland) S Vögele	1	4
(United States) M Brengle	4	6	6
(Australia) S Peers	6	1	2
(Austria) Y Meusburger	2	6	7
Q	(Hungary) M Czink	6	2	5
(China) J Lu	4	7^{7}	5
6	(Czech Republic) P Cetkovská	6	6^{4}	7
3	(France) M Johansson	7	6
Q	(Hong Kong) L Zhang	5	1
WC	(United Kingdom) K O'Brien	6	4	1
(Czech Republic) R Voráčová	2	6	6
(Greece) E Daniilidou	5	6	2
(Czech Republic) E Birnerová	7	4	6
WC	(United Kingdom) J Windley	2	1
8	(Thailand) T Tanasugarn	6	6

Second round
1	(Romania) M Niculescu	6	6
(United States) M Brengle	1	2
(Austria) Y Meusburger	4	1
6	(Czech Republic) P Cetkovská	6	6
3	(France) M Johansson	6	6
(Czech Republic) R Voráčová	4	2
(Czech Republic) E Birnerová	6^{6}	1
8	(Thailand) T Tanasugarn	7^{8}	6

Quarterfinals
1	(Romania) M Niculescu	4	4
6	(Czech Republic) P Cetkovská	6	6
3	(France) M Johansson	6^{5}	2
8	(Thailand) T Tanasugarn	7^{7}	6

Semifinals
6	(Czech Republic) P Cetkovská	6	6
8	(Thailand) T Tanasugarn	3	3

=== Bottom half ===
First round
7	(United Kingdom) A Keothavong	6	7^{7}
(Russia) R Kulikova	0	6^{2}
(Canada) S Dubois	6	6
(Japan) J Namigata	4	2
Q	(Czech Republic) K Plíšková	7	6^{7}
(France) I Brémond	6^{5}	2
(Ukraine) L Tsurenko	5	6	3
4	(Russia) E Rodina	7	1	6
5	(United Kingdom) E Baltacha	6	6
Q	(Ukraine) T Luzhanska	3	4
(Luxembourg) A Kremer	7^{7}	6
WC	(United Kingdom) A Fitzpatrick	6^{3}	3
WC	(United Kingdom) L Brown	2	1
(Russia) V Savinykh	6	6
(France) S Foretz Gacon	1	7^{7}	4
2	(Czech Republic) L Hradecká	6	6^{0}	6

Second round
7	(United Kingdom) A Keothavong	3	4
(Canada) S Dubois	6	6
Q	(Czech Republic) K Plíšková	2	6^{2}
4	(Russia) E Rodina	6	7^{7}
5	(United Kingdom) E Baltacha	6	6
(Luxembourg) A Kremer	3	1
(Russia) V Savinykh	6^{3}	6	3
2	(Czech Republic) L Hradecká	7^{7}	4	6

Quarterfinals
(Canada) S Dubois	6	6^{3}	6
4	(Russia) E Rodina	2	7^{7}	3
5	(United Kingdom) E Baltacha	6	6
2	(Czech Republic) L Hradecká	1	3

Semifinals
(Canada) S Dubois	2	2
5	(United Kingdom) E Baltacha	6	6
