= 2011 Nottingham Challenge – Men's singles =

Men's singles
- 2011 Nottingham Challenge

Final
- Champion: (Israel) Dudi Sela
- Runner-up: (France) Jérémy Chardy
- Score: 6–4, 3–6, 7–5

Events
Singles	men	women
Doubles	men	women
← 2010 ·	Nottingham Challenge	· 2012 →

Dudi Sela won the tournament after defeating Jérémy Chardy 6–4, 3–6, 7–5 in the final.

== Seeds ==
1. (France) Jérémy Chardy (final)
2. (Israel) Dudi Sela (champion)
3. (Netherlands) Jesse Huta Galung (first round)
4. (Japan) Tatsuma Ito (second round)
5. (Slovakia) Lukáš Lacko (first round)
6. (Colombia) Alejandro Falla (second round)
7. (Luxembourg) Gilles Müller (second round, retired)
8. (Italy) Simone Bolelli (second round)

== Draw ==
=== Key ===
- Q = Qualifier
- WC = Wild card
- LL = Lucky loser
- Alt = Alternate
- SE = Special exempt
- PR = Protected ranking
- ITF = ITF entry
- JE = Junior exempt
- w/o = Walkover
- r = Retired
- d = Defaulted
- SR = Special ranking

=== Finals ===
Semifinals
1	(France) Jérémy Chardy	6^{10}	7^{7}	7^{10}
(South Africa) Izak van der Merwe	7^{12}	6^{5}	6^{8}
SE	(Australia) Bernard Tomic	5	4
2	(Israel) Dudi Sela	7	6

Final
1	(France) Jérémy Chardy	4	6	5
2	(Israel) Dudi Sela	6	3	7

=== Top half ===
First round
1	(France) J Chardy	7	6
WC	(United Kingdom) D Smethurst	5	3
(Colombia) R Farah	6^{5}	7^{7}	6
Q	(United Kingdom) R Bloomfield	7^{7}	6^{0}	3
(Slovakia) K Beck	6	6
WC	(United Kingdom) D Evans	1	4
LL	(France) L Walter	6^{3}	4
7	(Luxembourg) G Müller	7^{7}	6
3	(Netherlands) J Huta Galung	4	4
(France) M Gicquel	6	6
(Belarus) U Ignatik	6^{4}	1
(South Africa) I van der Merwe	7^{7}	6
Q	(Russia) E Kirillov	6^{6}	6^{5}
(Slovenia) G Žemlja	7^{8}	7^{7}
(Switzerland) S Bohli	4	4
6	(Colombia) A Falla	6	6

Second round
1	(France) J Chardy	3	6	6
(Colombia) R Farah	6	4	1
(Slovakia) K Beck	6^{5}	6	0
7	(Luxembourg) G Müller	7^{7}	2	0^{r}
(France) M Gicquel	2	6	3
(South Africa) I van der Merwe	6	2	6
(Slovenia) G Žemlja	7	6
6	(Colombia) A Falla	5	3

Quarterfinals
1	(France) J Chardy	6	6
(Slovakia) K Beck	2	4
(South Africa) I van der Merwe	6	4	6
(Slovenia) G Žemlja	2	6	4

Semifinals
1	(France) J Chardy	6^{10}	7^{7}	7^{10}
(South Africa) I van der Merwe	7^{12}	6^{5}	6^{8}

=== Bottom half ===
First round
8	(Italy) S Bolelli	6	7^{7}
(Italy) F Cipolla	1	6^{2}
(France) É Roger-Vasselin	7^{7}	6
WC	(United Kingdom) Richard Gabb	6^{3}	2
SE	(Australia) B Tomic	6	3	6
Q	(Australia) C Ball	4	6	3
WC	(United Kingdom) A Ward	6^{4}	3
4	(Japan) T Ito	7^{7}	6
5	(Slovakia) L Lacko	3	7^{8}	1
(South Africa) R de Voest	6	6^{6}	6
(Russia) A Kudryavtsev	3	6^{5}
Q	(Denmark) F Nielsen	6	7^{7}
(Germany) A Beck	6	6
(Brazil) R Dutra da Silva	2	3
(Austria) M Fischer	4	3
2	(Israel) D Sela	6	6

Second round
8	(Italy) S Bolelli	3	6	3
(France) É Roger-Vasselin	6	3	6
SE	(Australia) B Tomic	6	6^{6}	7
4	(Japan) T Ito	3	7^{8}	5
(South Africa) R de Voest	6	6
Q	(Denmark) F Nielsen	2	4
(Germany) A Beck	3	1
2	(Israel) D Sela	6	6

Quarterfinals
(France) É Roger-Vasselin	7^{7}	4	3
SE	(Australia) B Tomic	6^{5}	6	6
(South Africa) R de Voest	4	4
2	(Israel) D Sela	6	6

Semifinals
SE	(Australia) B Tomic	5	4
2	(Israel) D Sela	7	6
