= 2010 İstanbul Cup – Singles =

Singles
- 2010 İstanbul Cup

Final
- Champion: (Russia) Anastasia Pavlyuchenkova
- Runner-up: (Russia) Elena Vesnina
- Score: 5–7, 7–5, 6–4

Details
- Draw: 32
- Seeds: 8

Events
Singles	Doubles
← 2009 ·	İstanbul Cup	· 2014 →

Vera Dushevina was the defending champion but lost to Jarmila Groth in the quarterfinals.

Anastasia Pavlyuchenkova won the title, defeating Elena Vesnina in the final 5–7, 7–5, 6–4.

== Seeds ==
1. (Italy) Francesca Schiavone (second round)
2. (Czech Republic) Petra Kvitová (first round)
3. (Russia) Anastasia Pavlyuchenkova (champion)
4. (Kazakhstan) Yaroslava Shvedova (first round)
5. (Bulgaria) Tsvetana Pironkova (second round)
6. (Germany) Andrea Petkovic (semifinals)
7. (Czech Republic) Klára Zakopalová (first round)
8. (Switzerland) Patty Schnyder (first round)

== Main draw ==
Key

- Q = Qualifier
- WC = Wild card
- LL = Lucky loser
- Alt = Alternate
- ITF = ITF entry
- PR = Protected ranking
- SR = Special ranking
- SE = Special exempt
- JE = Junior exempt
- JR = Junior Accelerator Programme entrant
- CO = College Accelerator Programme entrant
- NG = Next Gen Accelerator Program entrant
- w/o = Walkover
- r = Retired
- d = Defaulted

=== Finals ===
Semifinals
6	(Germany) Andrea Petkovic	6	0	6^{2}
(Russia) Elena Vesnina	1	6	7
3	(Russia) Anastasia Pavlyuchenkova	7	2	7
(Australia) Jarmila Groth	6^{1}	6	5

Final
(Russia) Elena Vesnina	7	5	4
3	(Russia) Anastasia Pavlyuchenkova	5	7	6

=== Top half ===
First round
1	(Italy) F Schiavone	6	6
(United Kingdom) A Keothavong	2	2
WC	(Turkey) Ç Büyükakçay	5	6^{4}
(United Kingdom) E Baltacha	7	7
Q	(Russia) E Makarova	6	6
(France) V Razzano	2	2
WC	(Turkey) P Özgen	2	1
6	(Germany) A Petkovic	6	6
4	(Kazakhstan) Y Shvedova	4	6^{5}
(Switzerland) S Vögele	6	7
Q	(Serbia) B Jovanovski	2	0
(Russia) E Vesnina	6	6
(Australia) A Rodionova	6	6
WC	(Turkey) B Eraydın	1	3
(Germany) T Malek	6^{4}	2
5	(Bulgaria) T Pironkova	7	6

Second round
1	(Italy) F Schiavone	4	2
(United Kingdom) E Baltacha	6	6
Q	(Russia) E Makarova	6^{5}	7	3
6	(Germany) A Petkovic	7	5	6
(Switzerland) S Vögele	3	2
(Russia) E Vesnina	6	6
(Australia) A Rodionova	6	3	6
5	(Bulgaria) T Pironkova	1	6	2

Quarterfinals
(United Kingdom) E Baltacha	4	0
6	(Germany) A Petkovic	6	6
(Russia) E Vesnina	7	6
(Australia) A Rodionova	5	1

Semifinals
6	(Germany) A Petkovic	6	0	6^{2}
(Russia) E Vesnina	1	6	7

=== Bottom half ===
First round
8	(Switzerland) P Schnyder	4	2
(Sweden) J Larsson	6	6
(Romania) S Cîrstea	7	6
(Uzbekistan) A Amanmuradova	6^{4}	3
(Slovakia) M Rybáriková	6	6
Q	(Germany) J Schruff	3	2
Q	(Poland) M Domachowska	1	0
3	(Russia) A Pavlyuchenkova	6	6
7	(Czech Republic) K Zakopalová	7	2	3
(Russia) A Lapushchenkova	5	6	6
(Germany) A-L Grönefeld	2	1
(Australia) J Groth	6	6
(Russia) V Dushevina	2	7	6
(Croatia) P Martić	6	5	3
(Latvia) A Sevastova	6	0	6
2	(Czech Republic) P Kvitová	2	6	4

Second round
(Sweden) J Larsson	4	4
(Romania) S Cîrstea	6	6
(Slovakia) M Rybáriková	3	2
3	(Russia) A Pavlyuchenkova	6	6
(Russia) A Lapushchenkova	2	3
(Australia) J Groth	6	6
(Russia) V Dushevina	6	6^{8}	6
(Latvia) A Sevastova	3	7	2

Quarterfinals
(Romania) S Cîrstea	4	2
3	(Russia) A Pavlyuchenkova	6	6
(Australia) J Groth	7	6
(Russia) V Dushevina	5	2

Semifinals
3	(Russia) A Pavlyuchenkova	7	2	7
(Australia) J Groth	6^{1}	6	5
