= Tennis at the 2000 Commonwealth Youth Games =

Tennis at the I Commonwealth Youth Games
- Dates: 10–14 August
- Host city: Edinburgh, Scotland
- Venue: Craiglockhart Tennis Centre
- Events: 2
- Participation: 46 athletes from 9 nations

At the 2000 Commonwealth Youth Games, the Lawn Tennis events were held at the Craiglockhart Tennis Centre in Edinburgh, Scotland from 10 to 14 August. Both the boys and girls events took place over a team format (two singles and one doubles match played over a best of three sets). Tie breaks were in effect, except for the deciding set, where a two-game winning margin was required.

No bronze medal match took place, and so both defeated semi-finalists are recorded as sharing the bronze

== Medal summary ==
=== Medal table ===
* Host nation ( SCO)

Rank	Nation	Gold	Silver	Bronze	Total
1	ENG	2	0	0	2
2	RSA	0	1	1	2
2	SCO*	0	1	1	2
4	AUS	0	0	1	1
4	IND	0	0	1	1
Totals (5 entries)		2	2	4	8

== Boys ==
=== Squad List ===
Participating teams and rosters
England	South Africa	Australia	India	Scotland	Wales	Isle of Man	Northern Ireland
Andrew Banks; Tom Pocock; Matthew Smith	Raven Klaasen; Clinton Jacobs; Peter-Jon Nomdo	Goran Kovacevic; Raphael Durek; Todd Reid	Girish Mishra; Anand Kumar; Bhuvan Chaturverdi	Matthew Allen; Ryan Maxfield; Steven Milne	Chris Morris; Michael Llewellyn; Stephen Wright	Mr Corke; Mr Barradell; Mr Buxton	David O'Connor; Mr Boyle; Mr Sinclaire

=== Bracket ===
Quarterfinals
10 Aug
Australia	3
Scotland	0
10 Aug
England	3
Northern Ireland	0
10 Aug
India	2
Wales	1
10 Aug
South Africa	3
Isle of Man	0

Semifinals
11 Aug
England	3
Australia	0
11 Aug
South Africa	2
India	1

Final
12 Aug
England	3
South Africa	0

=== Quarterfinals ===
10 Aug 2000	Australia	3–0	Scotland

	Individual matches
Kovacevic	2–0	Milne	6-3,6-3
Durek	2–0	Allen	6-1,6-2
Reid/Durek	3–0	Allen/Milne	6-4,6-2

10 Aug 2000	England	3–0	Northern Ireland

	Individual matches
Banks	2–0	O'Connor	6-3,6-3
Smith	2–0	O'Connor	6-2,6-1
Banks/Pocock	2–0	O'Connor/Sinclaire	6-1,6-2

10 Aug 2000	India	2–1	Wales

	Individual matches
Mishra	1–2	Morris	6-2,3-6,3-6
Kumar	2–1	Llewellyn	4-6,6-1,6-3
Chaturvedi/Kumar	2–0	Llewellyn/Wright	6-4,6-1

10 Aug 2000	South Africa	3–0	Isle of Man

	Individual matches
Jacobs	2–0	Corke	6-0,6-1
Nomdo	2–0	Barradell	6-1,6-0
Jacobs/Klaasen	2–0	Buxton/Corke	6-0,6-1

=== Semifinals ===
11 Aug 2000	England	3–0	Australia

	Individual matches
Banks	2–0	Kovacevic	6-4,6-4
Smith	2–0	Reid	6-0,6-4
Banks/Pocock	2–0	Kovacevic/Reid	6-4,6-1

11 Aug 2000	South Africa	2–1	India

	Individual matches
Klaasen	2–0	Mishra	6-2,6-3
Nomdo	1–2	Kumar	6-7,7-5,5-7
Jacobs/Klaasen	2–0	Chaturverdi/Kumar	6-1,6-0

=== Final ===
12 August 2000	England (gold)	3–0	South Africa (silver)

	Individual matches
Pocock	2–0	Klaasen	6-3,6-2
Banks	2–0	Nomdo	7-6,6-3
Banks/Pocock	2–0	Klaasen/Nomdo	7-6,7-5

== Girls ==
=== Squad List ===
Participating teams and rosters
England	Scotland	South Africa	Australia	Wales	Scotland Select	Jersey	India
Kathy Vymetal; Annabel Blow; Heidi Farr	Elena Baltacha; Mhairi Brown; Karen Patterson	Karen Coetzee; Chanelle Scheepers; Roxanne Clarke	Christina Wheeler; Jaslyn Hewitt; Melissa Dowse	Jenny Broughall; Rebecca Cooper; Miss Josson	Kirsty McRae; Miss Whitelaw	Jenny Lawy; Catherine Francescon	Radhika Tulpule; Sagarika Phadke

=== Bracket ===
Quarterfinals
10 Aug
South Africa	3
Wales	0
10 Aug
England	3
Scotland Select	0
10 Aug
Australia	3
Jersey	0
10 Aug
Scotland	2
India	1

Semifinals
11 Aug
England	2
South Africa	1
11 Aug
Scotland	2
Australia	1

Final
12 Aug
England	2
Scotland	1

=== Quarterfinals ===
10 Aug 2000	South Africa	3–0	Wales

	Individual matches
Coetzee	2–0	Broughall	6-2,6-0
Scheepers	2–0	Josson	6-1,6-0
Clarke/Coetzee	2–1	Cooper/Broughall	7-5,3-6,6-0

10 Aug 2000	Australia	3–0	Jersey

	Individual matches
Hewitt	2–0	Lawy	6-2,6-0
Dowse	2–0	Francescon	6-0,6-0
Dowse/Wheeler	2–0	Lawy/Francescon	6-1,6-0

10 Aug 2000	England	3–0	Scotland Select

	Individual matches
Vymetal	2–0	McRae	6-0,6-2
Farr	2–0	Whitelaw	6-1,6-3
Blow/Vymetal	2–0	McRae/Whitelaw	6-1,6-0

10 Aug 2000	Scotland	2–1	India

	Individual matches
Brown	1–2	Tulpule	4-6,7-6,6-8
Baltacha	2–1	Phadke	6-2,2-6,6-2
Baltacha/Brown	2–0	Phadke/Tulpule	6―0,7-5

=== Semifinals ===
11 Aug 2000	England	2–1	South Africa

	Individual matches
Vymetal	2–0	Coetzee	6-4,6-2
Farr	1–2	Scheepers	6-4,3-6,2-6
Blow/Vymetal	2–0	Clarke/Coetzee	6-0,6-2

11 Aug 2000	Scotland	2–1	Australia

	Individual matches
Brown	0–2	Hewitt	1-6,3-6
Baltacha	2–0	Wheeler	6-4,6-3
Baltacha/Brown	2–1	Wheeler/Hewitt	2-6,6-3,6-2

=== Final ===
12 August 2000	England (gold)	2–1	Scotland (silver)

	Individual matches
Vymetal	2–0	Paterson	6-4,6-2
Farr	2–0	Baltacha	6-4,6-4
Blow/Vymetal	0–2	Baltacha/Brown	3-6,2-6
