= 2012 Nottingham Challenge – Men's singles =

Men's singles
- 2012 Nottingham Challenge

Final
- Champion: (Slovenia) Grega Žemlja
- Runner-up: (Slovakia) Karol Beck
- Score: 7–6^{(7–3)}, 4–6, 6–4

Events
Singles	men	women
Doubles	men	women
← 2011 ·	Nottingham Challenge	· 2013 →

Dudi Sela was the defending champion, but he lost in the quarterfinals to Grega Žemlja.
Grega Žemlja won the title defeating Karol Beck in the final 7–6^{(7–3)}, 4–6, 6–4.

== Seeds ==
1. (Israel) Dudi Sela (quarterfinals)
2. (Slovakia) Karol Beck (final)
3. (United States) Michael Russell (second round)
4. (United States) Rajeev Ram (first round)
5. (Turkey) Marsel İlhan (first round)
6. (Slovenia) Grega Žemlja (champion)
7. (United States) Jesse Levine (semifinals)
8. (South Africa) Rik de Voest (second round)

== Draw ==
=== Key ===
- Q = Qualifier
- WC = Wild card
- LL = Lucky loser
- Alt = Alternate
- SE = Special exempt
- PR = Protected ranking
- ITF = ITF entry
- JE = Junior exempt
- w/o = Walkover
- r = Retired
- d = Defaulted
- SR = Special ranking

=== Finals ===
Semifinals
6	(Slovenia) Grega Žemlja	6	7^{7}
7	(United States) Jesse Levine	4	6^{3}
(South Africa) Izak van der Merwe	1	6	2
2	(Slovakia) Karol Beck	6	2	6

Final
6	(Slovenia) Grega Žemlja	7^{7}	4	6
2	(Slovakia) Karol Beck	6^{3}	6	4

=== Top half ===
First round
1	(Israel) D Sela	7^{8}	6
(Russia) E Donskoy	6^{6}	1
Q	(United Kingdom) R Bloomfield	6	6
Q	(Belarus) A Bury	2	4
(Czech Republic) J Mertl	6^{5}	7^{7}	6^{4}
WC	(United Kingdom) E Corrie	7^{7}	6^{4}	7^{7}
(Lithuania) R Berankis	4	6	4
6	(Slovenia) G Žemlja	6	4	6
4	(United States) R Ram	3	6^{4}
(Australia) J Duckworth	6	7^{7}
Q	(Switzerland) A Bossel	6	6
WC	(United Kingdom) L Bambridge	4	2
SE	(United States) R Kendrick	6	7
Q	(Switzerland) S Bohli	4	5
(Spain) A Menéndez	4	6^{6}
7	(United States) J Levine	6	7^{8}

Second round
1	(Israel) D Sela	6	6
Q	(United Kingdom) R Bloomfield	2	4
WC	(United Kingdom) E Corrie	6	3	6^{5}
6	(Slovenia) G Žemlja	4	6	7^{7}
(Australia) J Duckworth	6	1	7^{7}
Q	(Switzerland) A Bossel	2	6	6^{4}
SE	(United States) R Kendrick	3	4
7	(United States) J Levine	6	6

Quarterfinals
1	(Israel) D Sela	2	3
6	(Slovenia) G Žemlja	6	6
(Australia) J Duckworth	4	5
7	(United States) J Levine	6	7

Semifinals
6	(Slovenia) G Žemlja	6	7^{7}
7	(United States) J Levine	4	6^{3}

=== Bottom half ===
First round
5	(Turkey) M İlhan	6	6^{4}	4
(Russia) A Kuznetsov	4	7^{7}	6
(France) M Teixeira	2	4
(South Africa) I van der Merwe	6	6
(France) A Mannarino	4	6	6^{3}
(Japan) Y Sugita	6	3	7^{7}
(Chinese Taipei) J Wang	6	4	6^{5}
3	(United States) M Russell	2	6	7^{7}
8	(South Africa) R de Voest	6	6
(Thailand) D Udomchoke	3	2
(Poland) J Janowicz	3	6	6
(Lithuania) L Grigelis	6	3	3
WC	(United Kingdom) J Goodall	6	6
WC	(United Kingdom) K Edmund	2	3
(Germany) P Torebko	5	2
2	(Slovakia) K Beck	7	6

Second round
(Russia) A Kuznetsov	3	6	4
(South Africa) I van der Merwe	6	2	6
(Japan) Y Sugita	4	6	6
3	(United States) M Russell	6	3	4
8	(South Africa) R de Voest	3	2
(Poland) J Janowicz	6	6
WC	(United Kingdom) J Goodall	3	3
2	(Slovakia) K Beck	6	6

Quarterfinals
(South Africa) I van der Merwe	6	6
(Japan) Y Sugita	3	4
(Poland) J Janowicz	3	7^{10}	6^{1}
2	(Slovakia) K Beck	6	6^{8}	7^{7}

Semifinals
(South Africa) I van der Merwe	1	6	2
2	(Slovakia) K Beck	6	2	6
