= 2012 Nottingham Challenge – Men's doubles =

Men's doubles
- 2012 Nottingham Challenge

Final
- Champion: (France) O Charroin (Austria) M Fischer
- Runner-up: (Russia) E Donskoy (Russia) A Kuznetsov
- Score: 6–4, 7–6^{(8–6)}

Events
Singles	men	women
Doubles	men	women
← 2011 ·	Nottingham Challenge	· 2013 →

Rik de Voest and Adil Shamasdin were the defending champions but Shamasdin decided not to participate.
de Voest played alongside Karol Beck, but lost in the first round to Dominic Inglot and Jonathan Marray.
Olivier Charroin and Martin Fischer won the title defeating Evgeny Donskoy and Andrey Kuznetsov in the final 6–4, 7–6^{(8–6)}.

== Seeds ==
1. (Australia) Carsten Ball / (South Africa) Izak van der Merwe (first round)
2. (United States) John Paul Fruttero / (South Africa) Raven Klaasen (first round)
3. (United Kingdom) Dominic Inglot / (United Kingdom) Jonathan Marray (quarterfinals)
4. (Thailand) Sanchai Ratiwatana / (Thailand) Sonchat Ratiwatana (semifinals)

== Draw ==
=== Key ===
- Q = Qualifier
- WC = Wild card
- LL = Lucky loser
- Alt = Alternate
- SE = Special exempt
- PR = Protected ranking
- ITF = ITF entry
- JE = Junior exempt
- w/o = Walkover
- r = Retired
- d = Defaulted
- SR = Special ranking

=== Draw ===
First round
1	(Australia) C Ball (South Africa) I van der Merwe	4	7^{7}	[7]
Alt	(Australia) M Reid (Australia) J-P Smith	6	6^{2}	[10]
(Australia) C Ebelthite (Australia) J Peers	2	6^{5}
(France) O Charroin (Austria) M Fischer	6	7^{7}
4	(Thailand) Sa Ratiwatana (Thailand) So Ratiwatana	6	6
(Turkey) M İlhan (Thailand) D Udomchoke	4	2
WC	(Czech Republic) J Mertl (Slovenia) G Žemlja	2	6^{9}
(Chinese Taipei) C-p Hsieh (Chinese Taipei) H-h Lee	6	7^{11}
(Russia) E Donskoy (Russia) A Kuznetsov	6	5	[10]
(Spain) A Menéndez (Denmark) F Nielsen	4	7	[7]
(Slovakia) K Beck (South Africa) R de Voest	6^{5}	6^{5}
3	(United Kingdom) D Inglot (United Kingdom) J Marray	7^{7}	7^{7}
(Israel) D Sela (Chinese Taipei) J Wang	6	7
(Lithuania) L Grigelis (India) D Sharan	4	5
WC	(United Kingdom) L Bambridge (United Kingdom) J Goodall	6	6
2	(United States) JP Fruttero (South Africa) R Klaasen	4	3

Quarterfinals
Alt	(Australia) M Reid (Australia) J-P Smith	4	4
(France) O Charroin (Austria) M Fischer	6	6
4	(Thailand) Sa Ratiwatana (Thailand) So Ratiwatana	3	7^{7}	[10]
(Chinese Taipei) C-p Hsieh (Chinese Taipei) H-h Lee	6	6^{1}	[5]
(Russia) E Donskoy (Russia) A Kuznetsov	6	6
3	(United Kingdom) D Inglot (United Kingdom) J Marray	3	4
(Israel) D Sela (Chinese Taipei) J Wang	3	4
WC	(United Kingdom) L Bambridge (United Kingdom) J Goodall	6	6

Semifinals
(France) O Charroin (Austria) M Fischer	6	6
4	(Thailand) Sa Ratiwatana (Thailand) So Ratiwatana	3	4
(Russia) E Donskoy (Russia) A Kuznetsov	6	7^{7}
WC	(United Kingdom) L Bambridge (United Kingdom) J Goodall	4	6^{4}

Final
(France) O Charroin (Austria) M Fischer	6	7^{8}
(Russia) E Donskoy (Russia) A Kuznetsov	4	6^{6}
