= 2011 Internationaux Féminins de la Vienne – Doubles =

Doubles
- 2011 Internationaux Féminins de la Vienne

Final
- Champions: (France) Alizé Cornet (France) Virginie Razzano
- Runners-up: (Russia) Maria Kondratieva (France) Sophie Lefèvre
- Score: 6–3, 6–2

Events
Singles	Doubles
← 2010 ·	Internationaux Féminins de la Vienne	· 2012 →

Lucie Hradecká and Renata Voráčová were the defending champions, but both players chose not to participate.

Alizé Cornet and Virginie Razzano won the title defeating Maria Kondratieva and Sophie Lefèvre in the final 6–3, 6–2.

== Seeds ==
1. (Uzbekistan) Akgul Amanmuradova / (Germany) Kristina Barrois (semifinals, withdrew)
2. (Russia) Alexandra Panova / (Georgia (country)) Anna Tatishvili (quarterfinals)
3. (Croatia) Darija Jurak / (Russia) Valeria Savinykh (first round)
4. (Russia) Maria Kondratieva / (France) Sophie Lefèvre (final)

== Draw ==
=== Key ===
- Q = Qualifier
- WC = Wild card
- LL = Lucky loser
- Alt = Alternate
- SE = Special exempt
- PR = Protected ranking
- ITF = ITF entry
- JE = Junior exempt
- w/o = Walkover
- r = Retired
- d = Defaulted
- SR = Special ranking

=== Draw ===
First round
1	(Uzbekistan) A Amanmuradova (Germany) K Barrois	6	6
(Russia) N Gorbachkova (Russia) A Treskunova	1	0
(Sweden) S Arvidsson (France) I Pavlovic	6	7
(Romania) M Gojnea (Luxembourg) A Kremer	2	5
4	(Russia) M Kondratieva (France) S Lefèvre	6	6
WC	(France) M Partaud (France) L Tanfin	3	1
(Russia) M Melnikova (Georgia (country)) S Shapatava	2	4
(France) S Foretz Gacon (Slovakia) J Husárová	6	6
Alt	(Latvia) D Marcinkēviča (Czech Republic) S Záhlavová	5	4
(Poland) M Linette (Belarus) P Pekhova	7	6
(France) A Cornet (France) V Razzano	6	6
3	(Croatia) D Jurak (Russia) V Savinykh	3	2
(Poland) U Radwańska (Russia) E Rodina	3	2
(France) J Coin (France) P Parmentier	6	6
(Ukraine) V Ivakhnenko (Ukraine) K Kozlova	2	3
2	(Russia) A Panova (Georgia (country)) A Tatishvili	6	6

Quarterfinals
1	(Uzbekistan) A Amanmuradova (Germany) K Barrois	6	6
(Sweden) S Arvidsson (France) I Pavlovic	4	1
4	(Russia) M Kondratieva (France) S Lefèvre	7^{8}	6
(France) S Foretz Gacon (Slovakia) J Husárová	6^{6}	3
(Poland) M Linette (Belarus) P Pekhova	1	4
(France) A Cornet (France) V Razzano	6	6
(France) J Coin (France) P Parmentier	4	7^{7}	[10]
2	(Russia) A Panova (Georgia (country)) A Tatishvili	6	6^{4}	[5]

Semifinals
1	(Uzbekistan) A Amanmuradova (Germany) K Barrois
4	(Russia) M Kondratieva (France) S Lefèvre	w/o
(France) A Cornet (France) V Razzano	6	6
(France) J Coin (France) P Parmentier	3	3

Finals
4	(Russia) M Kondratieva (France) S Lefèvre	3	2
(France) A Cornet (France) V Razzano	6	6
