= 2010 İstanbul Cup – Doubles =

Doubles
- 2010 İstanbul Cup

Final
- Champions: (Greece) Eleni Daniilidou (Germany) Jasmin Wöhr
- Runners-up: (Russia) Maria Kondratieva (Czech Republic) Vladimíra Uhlířová
- Score: 6–4, 1–6, [11–9]

Details
- Draw: 16
- Seeds: 4

Events
Singles	Doubles
- İstanbul Cup

Lucie Hradecká and Renata Voráčová were the defending champions but chose not to participate that year.
The unseeded team of Eleni Daniilidou and Jasmin Wöhr defeated Maria Kondratieva and Vladimíra Uhlířová 6–4, 1–6, [11–9] in the final.

== Seeds ==
1. (Russia) Maria Kondratieva / (Czech Republic) Vladimíra Uhlířová (final)
2. (Germany) Andrea Petkovic / (Turkey) İpek Şenoğlu (first round)
3. (Austria) Sandra Klemenschits / (Switzerland) Patty Schnyder (quarterfinals)
4. (Romania) Sorana Cîrstea / (New Zealand) Marina Erakovic (first round)

== Draw ==
Key

- Q = Qualifier
- WC = Wild card
- LL = Lucky loser
- Alt = Alternate
- ITF = ITF entry
- PR = Protected ranking
- SR = Special ranking
- SE = Special exempt
- JE = Junior exempt
- JR = Junior Accelerator Programme entrant
- CO = College Accelerator Programme entrant
- NG = Next Gen Accelerator Program entrant
- w/o = Walkover
- r = Retired
- d = Defaulted

=== Draw ===
First round
1	(Russia) M Kondratieva (Czech Republic) V Uhlířová	6	6
(Indonesia) Y Basuki (Belarus) A Yakimova	2	2
WC	(Turkey) D Turhan (Bulgaria) H Esen	0	4
(France) S Lefèvre (Czech Republic) K Zakopalová	6	6
4	(Romania) S Cîrstea (New Zealand) M Erakovic	1	6^{6}
(United Kingdom) A Keothavong (Croatia) P Martić	6	7
(Belarus) E Dzehalevich (Georgia (country)) A Tatishvili	3	2
(Russia) A Panova (Belarus) T Poutchek	6	6
(Ukraine) Y Fedak (Ukraine) A Vasylyeva	2	4
(Greece) E Daniilidou (Germany) J Wöhr	6	6
(Sweden) J Larsson (Germany) T Malek	3	4
3	(Austria) S Klemenschits (Switzerland) P Schnyder	6	6
(Russia) A Pavlyuchenkova (Slovakia) M Rybáriková	6	6
(Georgia (country)) O Kalashnikova (France) I Pavlovic	3	0
WC	(Turkey) Ç Büyükakçay (Turkey) P Özgen	6	4	[12]
2	(Germany) A Petkovic (Turkey) İ Şenoğlu	3	6	[10]

Quarterfinals
1	(Russia) M Kondratieva (Czech Republic) V Uhlířová	6	6
(France) S Lefèvre (Czech Republic) K Zakopalová	3	1
(United Kingdom) A Keothavong (Croatia) P Martić	7	0	[6]
(Russia) A Panova (Belarus) T Poutchek	6^{3}	6	[10]
(Greece) E Daniilidou (Germany) J Wöhr	6	6
3	(Austria) S Klemenschits (Switzerland) P Schnyder	1	1
(Russia) A Pavlyuchenkova (Slovakia) M Rybáriková
WC	(Turkey) Ç Büyükakçay (Turkey) P Özgen	w/o

Semifinals
1	(Russia) M Kondratieva (Czech Republic) V Uhlířová	6	2	[10]
(Russia) A Panova (Belarus) T Poutchek	4	6	[6]
(Greece) E Daniilidou (Germany) J Wöhr	6	6
WC	(Turkey) Ç Büyükakçay (Turkey) P Özgen	3	2

Finals
1	(Russia) M Kondratieva (Czech Republic) V Uhlířová	4	6	[9]
(Greece) E Daniilidou (Germany) J Wöhr	6	1	[11]
