= 2011 Internationaux Féminins de la Vienne – Singles =

Singles
- 2011 Internationaux Féminins de la Vienne

Final
- Champion: (Japan) Kimiko Date-Krumm
- Runner-up: (United Kingdom) Elena Baltacha
- Score: 7–6^{(7–3)}, 6–4

Events
Singles	Doubles
← 2010 ·	Internationaux Féminins de la Vienne	· 2012 →

Sofia Arvidsson was the defending champion, but lost in the first round to Mădălina Gojnea.

Kimiko Date-Krumm won the title defeating Elena Baltacha in the final 7–6^{(7–3)}, 6–4.

== Seeds ==
1. (Czech Republic) Petra Cetkovská (second round)
2. (Czech Republic) Lucie Hradecká (first round)
3. (United Kingdom) Elena Baltacha (final)
4. (New Zealand) Marina Erakovic (second round)
5. (France) Pauline Parmentier (second round)
6. (Sweden) Sofia Arvidsson (first round)
7. (Romania) Sorana Cîrstea (first round)
8. (Italy) Alberta Brianti (second round)

== Main draw ==
=== Key ===
- Q = Qualifier
- WC = Wild card
- LL = Lucky loser
- Alt = Alternate
- SE = Special exempt
- PR = Protected ranking
- ITF = ITF entry
- JE = Junior exempt
- w/o = Walkover
- r = Retired
- d = Defaulted
- SR = Special ranking

=== Finals ===
Semifinals
WC	(France) Irena Pavlovic	6^{8}	1
3	(United Kingdom) Elena Baltacha	7^{10}	6
(Japan) Kimiko Date-Krumm	6	2	6
(Russia) Regina Kulikova	0	6	3

Final
3	(United Kingdom) Elena Baltacha	6^{3}	4
(Japan) Kimiko Date-Krumm	7^{7}	6

=== Top half ===
First round
1	(Czech Republic) P Cetkovská	6	6
WC	(France) J Coin	4	3
(France) S Foretz Gacon	2	1
WC	(France) I Pavlovic	6	6
(Russia) E Rodina	2	7	6
(France) I Brémond	6	5	4
Q	(Romania) M Gojnea	6	6
6	(Sweden) S Arvidsson	2	3
3	(United Kingdom) E Baltacha	6	6
(Russia) V Savinykh	1	1
Q	(Luxembourg) A Kremer	1	2
(France) V Razzano	6	6
(Germany) K Barrois	4	3
(Uzbekistan) A Amanmuradova	6	6
LL	(Poland) M Linette	3	6	6
7	(Romania) S Cîrstea	6	4	2

Second round
1	(Czech Republic) P Cetkovská	3	4
WC	(France) I Pavlovic	6	6
(Russia) E Rodina	6	2	3
Q	(Romania) M Gojnea	3	6	6
3	(United Kingdom) E Baltacha	6	6
(France) V Razzano	4	4
(Uzbekistan) A Amanmuradova	6	3^{r}
LL	(Poland) M Linette	4	3

Quarterfinals
WC	(France) I Pavlovic	3	6	6
Q	(Romania) M Gojnea	6	2	4
3	(United Kingdom) E Baltacha	6	6
LL	(Poland) M Linette	3	3

Semifinals
WC	(France) I Pavlovic	6^{8}	1
3	(United Kingdom) E Baltacha	7^{10}	6

=== Bottom half ===
First round
8	(Italy) A Brianti	6	6
(Czech Republic) S Záhlavová	3	3
(Russia) A Panova	7^{7}	6
WC	(France) I Ramialison	6^{4}	1
(Japan) K Date-Krumm	6	3	6
(Russia) V Dolonts	4	6	3
WC	(France) V Larrière	6	5	5
4	(New Zealand) M Erakovic	3	7	7
5	(France) P Parmentier	6	4	6
(Poland) U Radwańska	3	6	3
Q	(Poland) P Sanduska	1	0
(Russia) R Kulikova	6	6
(France) A Cornet	6	2	4
(Georgia (country)) A Tatishvili	0	6	6
Q	(Italy) N Burnett	6	3	6
2	(Czech Republic) L Hradecká	2	6	4

Second round
8	(Italy) A Brianti	3	2
(Russia) A Panova	6	6
(Japan) K Date-Krumm	6	6
4	(New Zealand) M Erakovic	4	3
5	(France) P Parmentier	1	5
(Russia) R Kulikova	6	7
(Georgia (country)) A Tatishvili	7	6
Q	(Italy) N Burnett	5	4

Quarterfinals
(Russia) A Panova	3	6^{2}
(Japan) K Date-Krumm	6	7^{7}
(Russia) R Kulikova	6	3	6
(Georgia (country)) A Tatishvili	4	6	4

Semifinals
(Japan) K Date-Krumm	6	2	6
(Russia) R Kulikova	0	6	3
