= 2011 Internationaux Féminins de la Vienne =

- Date: 24–30 October
- Edition: 11th
- Location: Poitiers, France

Champions

Singles
- (Japan) Kimiko Date-Krumm

Doubles
- (France) Alizé Cornet / (France) Virginie Razzano
← 2010 ·	Internationaux Féminins de la Vienne	· 2012 →

The 2011 Internationaux Féminins de la Vienne was a professional tennis tournament played on hard courts. It was the eleventh edition of the tournament which was part of the 2011 ITF Women's Circuit. It took place in Poitiers, France between 24 and 30 October 2011.

== WTA entrants ==
=== Seeds ===
Country	Player	Rank^{1}	Seed
CZE	Petra Cetkovská	32	1
CZE	Lucie Hradecká	51	2
GBR	Elena Baltacha	58	3
NZL	Marina Erakovic	60	4
FRA	Pauline Parmentier	65	5
SWE	Sofia Arvidsson	66	6
ROU	Sorana Cîrstea	67	7
ITA	Alberta Brianti	73	8

- ^{1} Rankings are as of October 17, 2011.

=== Other entrants ===
The following players received wildcards into the singles main draw:

- (France) Julie Coin
- (France) Victoria Larrière
- (France) Irena Pavlovic
- (France) Irina Ramialison

The following players received entry from the qualifying draw:

- (Italy) Nastassya Burnett
- (Romania) Mădălina Gojnea
- (Luxembourg) Anne Kremer
- (Poland) Patrycja Sanduska

The following player received entry from a Lucky loser spot:

- (Poland) Magda Linette

== Champions ==
=== Singles ===
(Japan) Kimiko Date-Krumm def. (United Kingdom) Elena Baltacha, 7–6^{(7–3)}, 6–4

=== Doubles ===
(France) Alizé Cornet / (France) Virginie Razzano def. (Russia) Maria Kondratieva / (France) Sophie Lefèvre, 6–3, 6–2
