= 2012 Nottingham Challenge =

- Date: June 11–17
- Edition: 2nd
- Surface: Grass
- Location: Nottingham, Great Britain

Champions

Men's singles
- (Slovenia) Grega Žemlja

Women's singles
- (Australia) Ashleigh Barty

Men's doubles
- (France) Olivier Charroin / (Austria) Martin Fischer

Women's doubles
- (Australia) Ashleigh Barty / (Australia) Sally Peers
← 2011 ·	Nottingham Challenge	· 2013 →

The 2012 Nottingham Challenge (known for sponsorship reasons as the Aegon Nottingham Challenge) was a professional tennis tournament played on grass courts. It was the second edition of the tournament which was part of the 2012 ATP Challenger Tour and the 2012 ITF Women's Circuit. It took place in Nottingham, Great Britain between 11 and 17 June 2012.

== ATP entrants ==
=== Seeds ===
Country	Player	Rank^{1}	Seed
ISR	Dudi Sela	95	1
SVK	Karol Beck	104	2
USA	Michael Russell	110	3
USA	Rajeev Ram	123	4
TUR	Marsel İlhan	124	5
SVN	Grega Žemlja	129	6
USA	Jesse Levine	131	7
RSA	Rik de Voest	144	8

- ^{1} Rankings are as of May 28, 2012.

=== Other entrants ===
The following players received wildcards into the singles main draw:

- (United Kingdom) Luke Bambridge
- (United Kingdom) Edward Corrie
- (United Kingdom) Kyle Edmund
- (United Kingdom) Joshua Goodall

The following players received entry as a special exempt into the singles main draw:

- (United States) Robert Kendrick

The following players received entry from the qualifying draw:

- (United Kingdom) Richard Bloomfield
- (Switzerland) Stéphane Bohli
- (Switzerland) Adrien Bossel
- (Belarus) Aliaksandr Bury

== WTA entrants ==
=== Seeds ===
Country	Player	Rank^{1}	Seed
BLR	Anastasiya Yakimova	100	1
CZE	Karolína Plíšková	122	2
RUS	Valeria Savinykh	127	3
JPN	Erika Sema	134	4
RUS	Vitalia Diatchenko	143	5
FRA	Claire Feuerstein	145	6
ITA	Camila Giorgi	146	7
ROU	Mihaela Buzărnescu	149	8

- ^{1} Rankings are as of May 28, 2012.

=== Other entrants ===
The following players received wildcards into the singles main draw:

- (United Kingdom) Katy Dunne
- (United Kingdom) Anna Fitzpatrick
- (United Kingdom) Jade Windley
- (United Kingdom) Lisa Whybourn

The following players received entry from the qualifying draw:

- (Turkey) Çağla Büyükakçay
- (Portugal) Maria João Koehler
- (Switzerland) Conny Perrin
- (Russia) Marta Sirotkina

The following players received entry by a Junior Exempt:

- (Australia) Ashleigh Barty

== Champions ==
=== Men's singles ===
- (Slovenia) Grega Žemlja def. (Slovakia) Karol Beck, 7–6^{(7–3)}, 4–6, 6–4

=== Men's doubles ===
- (France) Olivier Charroin / (Austria) Martin Fischer def. (Russia) Evgeny Donskoy / (Russia) Andrey Kuznetsov, 6–4, 7–6^{(8–6)}

=== Women's singles ===
- (Australia) Ashleigh Barty def. (Germany) Tatjana Malek, 6–1, 6–1

=== Women's doubles ===
- (Australia) Ashleigh Barty / (Australia) Sally Peers def. (Hungary) Réka-Luca Jani / (Portugal) Maria João Koehler, 7–6^{(7–2)}, 3–6, [10–5]
