= 2011 Nottingham Challenge – Men's doubles =

Men's doubles
- 2011 Nottingham Challenge

Final
- Champion: (South Africa) Rik de Voest; (Canada) Adil Shamasdin
- Runner-up: (Philippines) Treat Conrad Huey; (South Africa) Izak van der Merwe
- Score: 6–3, 7–6^{(11–9)}

Events
Singles	men	women
Doubles	men	women
← 2010 ·	Nottingham Challenge	· 2012 →

Rik de Voest and Adil Shamasdin won the final 6–3, 7–6^{(11–9)} against Treat Conrad Huey and Izak van der Merwe.

== Seeds ==
1. (United States) James Cerretani / (Germany) Philipp Marx (semifinals)
2. (United Kingdom) Jamie Delgado / (United Kingdom) Jonathan Marray (withdrew)
3. (Sweden) Johan Brunström / (Denmark) Frederik Nielsen (quarterfinals)
4. (Switzerland) Yves Allegro / (France) Jérémy Chardy (quarterfinals)

== Draw ==
=== Key ===
- Q = Qualifier
- WC = Wild card
- LL = Lucky loser
- Alt = Alternate
- SE = Special exempt
- PR = Protected ranking
- ITF = ITF entry
- JE = Junior exempt
- w/o = Walkover
- r = Retired
- d = Defaulted
- SR = Special ranking

=== Draw ===
First round

Quarterfinals

Semifinals

Final

1
- (United States) J Cerretani
- (Germany) P Marx
7^{7}
6

WC
- (United Kingdom) D Evans
- (United Kingdom) J Milton
6^{1}
3

1
- (United States) J Cerretani
- (Germany) P Marx
6
3
[11]

WC
(United Kingdom) R Bloomfield
(United Kingdom) Timothy Bradshaw
6
6

WC
(United Kingdom) R Bloomfield
(United Kingdom) Timothy Bradshaw
4
6
[9]

- (Germany) F Moser
- (Sweden) A Siljeström
2
4

1
- (United States) J Cerretani
- (Germany) P Marx
3
2

4
- (Switzerland) Y Allegro
- (France) J Chardy
6
7

- (South Africa) R de Voest
- (Canada) A Shamasdin
6
6

WC
(United Kingdom) Richard Gabb
(United Kingdom) Toby Martin
2
5

4
- (Switzerland) Y Allegro
- (France) J Chardy
3
4

- (South Africa) R de Voest
- (Canada) A Shamasdin
7^{7}
6

- (South Africa) R de Voest
- (Canada) A Shamasdin
6
6

- (Germany) M Emmrich
- (Colombia) R Farah
6^{2}
3

- (South Africa) R de Voest
- (Canada) A Shamasdin
6
7^{11}

- (Philippines) TC Huey
- (South Africa) I van der Merwe
6
7^{7}

- (Philippines) TC Huey
- (South Africa) I van der Merwe
3
6^{9}

- (Italy) F Cipolla
- (United States) D Martin
0
6^{4}

- (Philippines) TC Huey
- (South Africa) I van der Merwe
6
7^{7}

- (Thailand) Sa Ratiwatana
- (Thailand) So Ratiwatana
4
2

3
- (Sweden) J Brunström
- (Denmark) F Nielsen
3
6^{5}

3
- (Sweden) J Brunström
- (Denmark) F Nielsen
6
6

- (Philippines) TC Huey
- (South Africa) I van der Merwe
7
6

- (Australia) C Ball
- (Netherlands) J Huta Galung
6
6

- (Australia) C Ball
- (Netherlands) J Huta Galung
5
2

- (Italy) S Bolelli
- (Italy) A Motti
3
4

- (Australia) C Ball
- (Netherlands) J Huta Galung
6
6

- (Russia) M Elgin
- (Israel) D Sela
6^{5}
4

Alt
- (Germany) A Beck
- (Colombia) A Falla
4
4

Alt
- (Germany) A Beck
- (Colombia) A Falla
7^{7}
6
