= 2011 Nottingham Challenge =

- Date: June 6 – June 12
- Edition: 1st
- Location: Nottingham, Great Britain

Champions

Men's singles
- (Israel) Dudi Sela

Women's singles
- (United Kingdom) Elena Baltacha

Men's doubles
- (South Africa) Rik de Voest / (Canada) Adil Shamasdin

Women's doubles
- (Czech Republic) Eva Birnerová / (Czech Republic) Petra Cetkovská
Nottingham Challenge	· 2012 →

The 2011 Nottingham Challenge (known for sponsorship reasons as Aegon Nottingham Challenge) was a professional tennis tournament played on outdoor grass courts. It was part of the 2011 ATP Challenger Tour and the 2011 ITF Women's Circuit. It took place in Nottingham, Great Britain between June 6 and June 12, 2011.

== ATP entrants ==
=== Seeds ===
Nationality	Player	Ranking*	Seeding
FRA	Jérémy Chardy	61	1
ISR	Dudi Sela	91	2
NED	Jesse Huta Galung	113	3
SVK	Lukáš Lacko	115	4
COL	Alejandro Falla	120	5
LUX	Gilles Müller	121	6
BRA	João Souza	125	7
ITA	Simone Bolelli	126	8

- Rankings are as of May 23, 2011.

=== Other entrants ===
The following players received wildcards into the singles main draw:

- (United Kingdom) Daniel Evans
- (United Kingdom) Richard Gabb
- (United Kingdom) Daniel Smethurst
- (United Kingdom) Alexander Ward

The following players received entry into the singles main draw as a special exemption:

- (Australia) Bernard Tomic

The following players received entry from the qualifying draw:

- (Australia) Carsten Ball
- (United Kingdom) Richard Bloomfield
- (Russia) Evgeny Kirillov
- (Denmark) Frederik Nielsen

== ITF entrants ==
=== Seeds ===
Nationality	Player	Ranking*	Seeding
ROU	Monica Niculescu	44	1
CZE	Lucie Hradecká	45	2
FRA	Mathilde Johansson	68	3
RUS	Evgeniya Rodina	81	4
GBR	Elena Baltacha	83	5
CZE	Petra Cetkovská	98	6
GBR	Anne Keothavong	108	7
THA	Tamarine Tanasugarn	116	8

- Rankings are as of June 6, 2011.

=== Other entrants ===
The following players received wildcards into the singles main draw:

- (United Kingdom) Anna Fitzpatrick
- (United Kingdom) Katie O'Brien
- (United Kingdom) Lucy Brown
- (United Kingdom) Jade Windley

The following players received entry from the qualifying draw:

- (Hungary) Melinda Czink
- (Ukraine) Tetiana Luzhanska
- (Czech Republic) Kristýna Plíšková
- (Hong Kong) Zhang Ling

== Champions ==
=== Men's singles ===
(Israel) Dudi Sela def. (France) Jérémy Chardy, 6–4, 3–6, 7–5

=== Women's singles ===
(United Kingdom) Elena Baltacha def. (Czech Republic) Petra Cetkovská, 7–5, 6–3

=== Men's doubles ===
(South Africa) Rik de Voest / (Canada) Adil Shamasdin def. (Philippines) Treat Conrad Huey / (South Africa) Izak van der Merwe, 6–3, 7–6^{(11–9)}

=== Women's doubles ===
(Czech Republic) Eva Birnerová / (Czech Republic) Petra Cetkovská def. (Russia) Regina Kulikova / (Russia) Evgeniya Rodina, 6–3, 6–2
