= Elena Baltacha =

British tennis player (1983–2014)

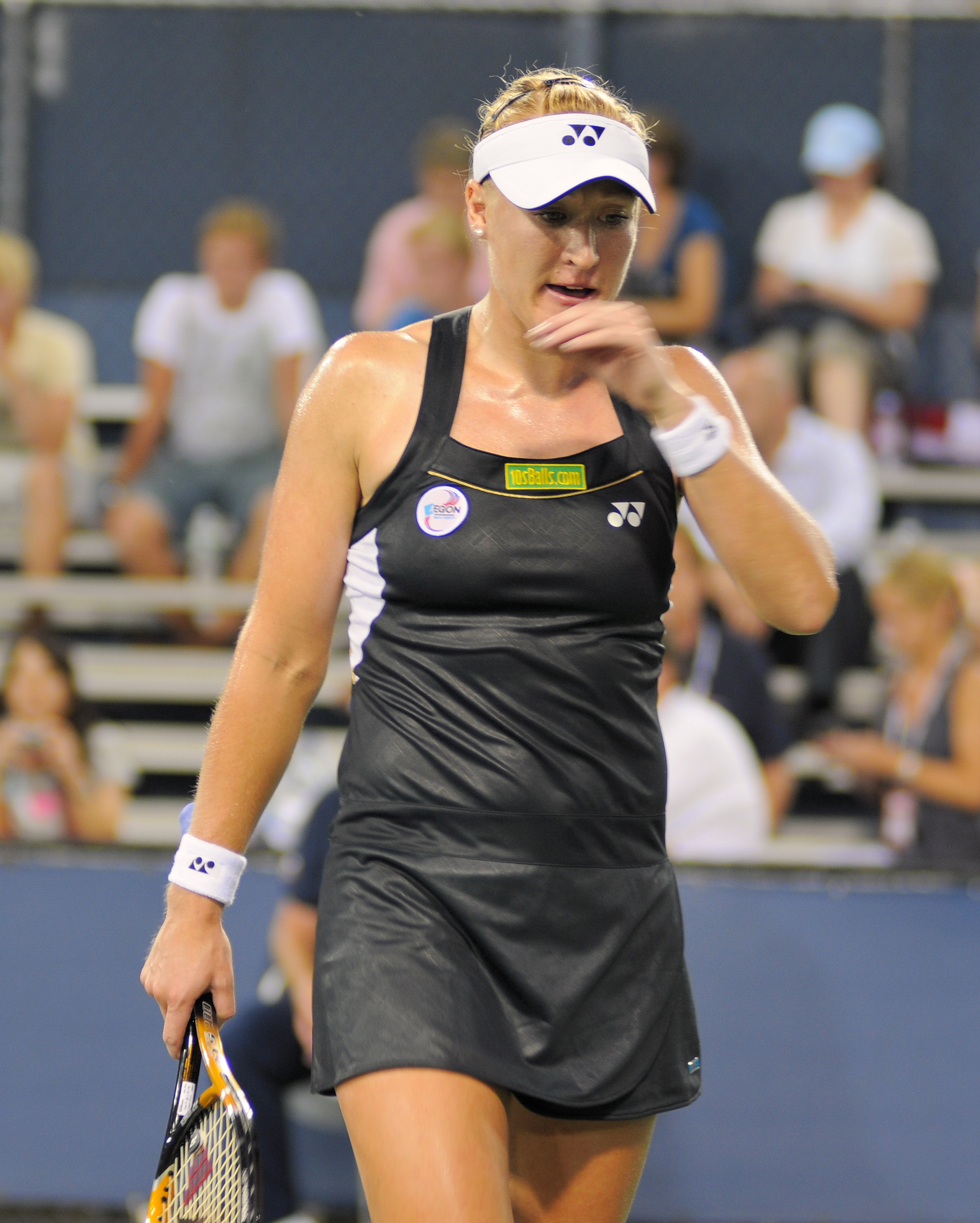
- Baltacha at the 2010 US Open
- Country (sports): (United Kingdom) Great Britain
- Born: 14 August 1983 Kyiv, Ukrainian SSR, Soviet Union (now Ukraine)
- Died: 4 May 2014 (aged 30) Ipswich, Suffolk, England, UK
- Height: 1.75 m (5 ft 9 in)
- Turned pro: 1997
- Retired: 2013
- Plays: Right-handed (two-handed backhand)
- Prize money: $1,190,893

Singles
- Career record: 324–243
- Career titles: 11 ITF
- Highest ranking: No. 49 (13 September 2010)

Grand Slam singles results
- Australian Open: 3R (2005, 2010)
- French Open: 2R (2011)
- Wimbledon: 3R (2002)
- US Open: 2R (2010, 2011)

Doubles
- Career record: 59–59
- Career titles: 4 ITF
- Highest ranking: No. 211 (17 January 2011)

Grand Slam doubles results
- Australian Open: 2R (2010)
- Wimbledon: 2R (2005, 2010)

Grand Slam mixed doubles results
- Wimbledon: 3R (2002)

Team competitions
- Fed Cup: 33–16

Elena Baltacha
Medal record

Tennis

Representing Scotland

Commonwealth Youth Games
Silver medal – second place	2000 Edinburgh	Team

Elena Sergeyevna Baltacha (Ukrainian: Олена Сергіївна Балтача; 14 August 1983 – 4 May 2014) was a Ukrainian-born British professional tennis player. Being a four-time winner of the AEGON Awards, she was also a long-term British No. 1, a position she held intermittently from 2002 to 2012. However, as a result of her absence from competition due to knee surgery, she dropped down the world rankings and at the time of her retirement on 18 November 2013, she was ranked as the world No. 221 and British No. 6. Her career-high ranking of world No. 49 was achieved in September 2010.

Over the course of her career, she won 11 ITF singles titles (five $25k, two $50k, two $75k, and two $100k) and four ITF doubles titles (all $25k). She was also a runner-up in three ITF events in singles and four in doubles. In 2010, Baltacha had victories over top 10-players, including two victories over Li Na (the second of which came via retirement) and one against Francesca Schiavone, who at the time was the reigning French Open champion. In 2011, Baltacha won her highest ranked tournament on the ITF Circuit, the Nottingham Challenge.

Baltacha was diagnosed with liver cancer in January 2014, just a few weeks after her marriage to tennis coach Nino Severino. She died on 4 May 2014, aged 30.

== Personal life ==
Born in Kyiv, Ukraine, Baltacha moved with her family following a transfer of football clubs by her professional footballer father, Sergei. He represented the Soviet Union and from 1988 to 1995 played in the United Kingdom for Ipswich Town, St Johnstone and Inverness Caledonian Thistle. Her mother Olga was a sportswoman. Her brother Sergei played football for St Mirren and Millwall.

After arriving at Heathrow Airport on 13 January 1989, Baltacha moved to Ipswich where her father was to play football for the next year before moving to Perth, Scotland, where she grew up and spent some of her teenage years, before moving to Paisley, Scotland, and attending Castlehead High School.

Living in Ipswich, on 8 December 2013, a month after her retirement from tennis, she married her coach Niño Severino, a retired professional tennis coach turned multi-sports specialist in mental and movement training coach, who also works with Ipswich Town F.C. and in coaching martial arts athletes. In 2010, the couple formed the Elena Baltacha Academy of Tennis, which is still run by Niño and based around the facilities at Ipswich Sports Club, where she trained during her career.

At the age of 19, she was diagnosed with the liver condition primary sclerosing cholangitis and in June 2010, she became patron of the Children's Liver Disease Foundation. Baltacha was diagnosed with liver cancer in January 2014. She died from the disease on 4 May 2014 at the age of 30. Several players paid tribute to Baltacha on Twitter including Grand Slam champions Martina Navratilova, Serena Williams, Billie Jean King, Maria Sharapova, Victoria Azarenka, Kim Clijsters, Petra Kvitová, Marion Bartoli, Chris Evert, Sam Stosur and Svetlana Kuznetsova. A host of ATP and WTA tennis players past and present came together on the centre court at the Madrid Open as a mark of respect for Baltacha. Baltacha's funeral took place on 19 May and was attended by Tim Henman, Annabel Croft, Laura Robson, Jo Durie and Judy Murray among others. Mourners were asked to wear bright colours instead of black and to donate to Rally for Bally rather than buying flowers. The money was to be split equally between the Royal Marsden Cancer Charity and the Elena Baltacha Academy of Tennis, which she set up to help disadvantaged children take up the sport. Baltacha is interred in the Ipswich Millennium Cemetery.

In May 2015, it was announced that the trophy at the Nottingham Open was to be named the "Elena Baltacha Trophy" in her honour.

== Career ==
=== Junior years (1997–2001) ===
Baltacha played her first match on the ITF Junior Circuit in February 1997 and her last at the 2001 US Open junior tournament. She never won a title but reached the final of two junior tournaments, at the 14th Bahia Junior Cup and at the LTA International Junior Tournament, Bisham Abbey. Baltacha also reached the semifinals of three tournaments and the quarterfinals of six others. In 2001, she reached the semifinals of the Wimbledon juniors championships where she was beaten by eventual champion, Angelique Widjaja. Over the course of her career as a junior, she gained wins over players such as Svetlana Kuznetsova, Gisela Dulko (twice) and Anne Keothavong. Her career-high singles ranking was world No. 77 and her final singles win–loss record was 40–40. Aside from junior ITF events, Baltacha also competed in the Commonwealth Youth Games in 2000, representing Scotland, and won a silver medal alongside Karen Paterson and Mhairi Brown in the women's team event.

As a doubles competitor, Baltacha won four tournaments and lost in the final of four more. She also lost in the semifinal stages of tournaments four times and the quarterfinals eight times. Her final doubles win–loss record was 37–30 and her career-high doubles ranking was world No. 60.

=== 1997–2000 ===
In November 1997, Baltacha made her debut on the ITF Circuit in Edinburgh where she was beaten in the first round of the qualifying stages in three sets by Danica Kovakova. She did however reach the quarterfinals of the doubles tournament. She played only three adult ITF tournaments in 1998 (Birmingham, Southsea and Glasgow, all $10k events) and lost in the qualifying stages for each of them. 1999 saw her first ITF main draw appearances. She competed in four tournaments in total and reached the quarterfinals of the $10k tournament in Glasgow.

In April 2000, she reached the quarterfinals of the $10k tournament in Bournemouth as a qualifier. Baltacha was given a wildcard into the qualifying draw of her home Grand Slam, Wimbledon, where Flavia Pennetta beat her in three sets. In October, she received another wildcard, this one into the Swisscom Challenge, a Tier-I event held in Zürich. The very next week, she was a quarterfinalist at the $50k tournament in Cardiff. Her season ending singles ranking was 397.

=== 2001–02 ===
Baltacha reached the quarterfinals of her first tournament of the year in January, a $10k tournament in Jersey, when she was forced to retire early in the second set. She was out of action until late April when she reached the quarterfinals of the $10k tournament in Hatfield, Hertfordshire. Two weeks later she reached the quarterfinals of the $25k tournament in Edinburgh as a qualifier. She followed this up with a run to the semifinals of the $25k event in Surbiton. She was then given a wildcard into the qualifying draw for the Tier-II Eastbourne International where she beat Virginie Razzano, in the final round of qualifying to reach the main draw. Conchita Martínez beat her in the first round. Just a week later she was given a wildcard into the main draw of Wimbledon to give her the first appearance in the main draw of a Grand Slam championship. She was beaten by Nathalie Dechy in round one. Following Wimbledon she reached yet another ITF quarterfinal; this one in a $25k tournament in Felixstowe. She lost in round one of the qualifying tournament for the US Open in August and competed in four more ITF tournaments, reaching the quarterfinals of two of them (both $25k). She ended the year with a singles ranking of world No. 248.

In February 2002, Baltacha reached the quarterfinals of the $25k tournament in Sutton, London. She played for Great Britain in the Fed Cup in April and won her singles rubber against Norway's Annette Aksdal. She then beat Lina Stančiūtė from Lithuania in the relegation play-offs in three sets. Following this she attempted to qualify for the Tier III Croatian Bol Ladies Open where she was beaten in round one of the qualifying draw. This was the first of a string of five consecutive losses, the last of which was in the first round of the qualifying draw for the Birmingham Classic, a Tier III event. She broke this string of losses with a win over Alina Jidkova in round one of the qualifying draw for the Tier-II Eastbourne International. She was beaten by Elena Likhovtseva in the second round of qualifying. She was then given a wildcard into the main draw of Wimbledon where she beat María Vento-Kabchi in the first round and Amanda Coetzer in the second before losing to Likhovtseva (for the second time in two consecutive tournaments) in the third round.

Her next tournament was the $25k event in Felixstowe which she won by beating Irishwoman Kelly Liggan in the final to give her the first ITF Circuit singles title of her career. Two weeks later, she won her second title in Pamplona, again $25k, when she defeated Virginie Pichet in the final. After this, she attempted to qualify for the US Open but lost in the first round of the qualifying for the second consecutive year. She played two more $25k tournaments after the US Open, Glasgow and Southampton, where she reached the semifinals and quarterfinals, respectively. Her season ending ranking for 2002 was world No. 157.

=== 2003–04 ===
Baltacha's 2003 season started slowly; she lost in round one of the qualifying tournament for the first Grand Slam of the year, the Australian Open. In April she was again part of the Great Britain Fed Cup team but lost her only match against Hungary's Petra Mandula. She spent May failing to qualify for the Tier-III tournament, the Internationaux de Strasbourg and French Open. In June she was given a wildcard into the main draw of the Birmingham Classic but was forced to retire during her first round match against fellow Brit Jane O'Donoghue after the first game of the final set. She was then awarded another wild card; this one into the qualifying draw of the Tier II Eastbourne International where she was beaten by Virginie Razzano. For the third year running, she received a wildcard into the main draw of Wimbledon where she forced the former world No. 5, Jelena Dokić, to fight for her eventual three-set victory. This was Baltacha's final match of the year as she underwent invasive surgery after Wimbledon (to determine the cause of her persistent liver troubles) which put her out of action until 2004. As a result, her year-end singles ranking fell to world number 373.

Baltacha returned to action in January 2004, reaching the semifinals of her first two ITF tournaments of the year. These were the $10k event in Kingston upon Hull and the $25k event in Sunderland. She played in the Fed Cup for the Great Britain Fed Cup team where she won her two singles rubbers against Turkey and Romania by beating Cigdem Duru and Monica Niculescu, respectively. She also beat Irishwoman Yvonne Doyle in the Europe/Africa Group II Play-offs. In June, Samantha Stosur beat her in the first round of the Birmingham and Cara Black beat her in the final round of the qualifying tournament for the Eastbourne International one week later. Baltacha then headed to Wimbledon main draw courtesy of another wildcard. She demolished world No. 61, Marta Marrero, in round one before falling to three-time Grand Slam champion, Jennifer Capriati, in the second round.

Between Wimbledon and the US Open qualifying tournament (where she reached the second round before being beaten by Angelique Widjaja), she suffered three consecutive first-round losses in $50k tournaments in the United States. After the US Open, she reached the final of a $25k event in Jersey where she was beaten by Emma Laine. She spent the remainder of her year competing on the ITF Circuit and her year-end singles ranking rose to world No. 202.

=== 2005–06 ===
In the 2005 Australian Open qualifying tournament, she won three matches in straight sets to qualify; she beat Els Callens, Jaslyn Hewitt and Teryn Ashley in rounds one, two and three, respectively. In the first round of the main draw, she beat Katarina Srebotnik who later remarked that the Brit was "on fire" and that "if [Elena] plays like today, she can beat anyone. Some of the shots she was hitting were unbelievable." She continued her winning streak with another three-set victory in round two, this one over Frenchwoman Stéphanie Cohen-Aloro. Unfortunately for Baltacha, she ran out of steam in the third round, losing to No. 15 seed, Silvia Farina Elia. She used her momentum from her good performance in the first Grand Slam event of the year to carry her to the semifinals of her next tournament, a $25k event in Sunderland where she lost to Sofia Arvidsson. She then immediately reached the final of another $25k event (this one in Redbridge, London) before being beaten by Nika Ožegović. She again played for Great Britain in the Fed Cup. She lost her singles rubber against Ana Timotić from Serbia, won her singles rubber against Karina-Ildor Jacobsgaard and was demolished in her third singles rubber against Katarina Srebotnik in retribution for her first round Australian Open exit. In the Europe/Africa Group I Play-off, Baltacha was defeated by Ukrainian Alona Bondarenko.

Baltacha then failed to qualify for two consecutive Tier-I events before losing in the first round of qualifying for the French Open when she lost to Elise Tamaëla. In June, three consecutive wildcards granted her entry into the main draws of the DFS Classic, the Aegon International and Wimbledon where she was beaten by Milagros Sequera in the second round (having beaten Alona Bondarenko in the first), Conchita Martínez in round one and Sabine Klaschka in the first round, respectively. Following Wimbledon, Baltacha travelled to the ITF Circuit in the United States without much success; she won only one of five matches she played in the run-up to the US Open qualifying draw where she also lost in the first round of qualifying. She then returned to the ITF Circuit and reached the quarterfinals of the $25k event in Glasgow, the semifinals of the $25k event in Bolton and won the $25k tournament in Jersey. Her year-end singles ranking for the 2005 season was world No. 122.

For Baltacha, 2006 was a year much shortened by injury. Her first tournament of the year was the qualifying event for the Australian Open where she lost to Yuan Meng at the second stage of qualifying. In February she played one $25k ITF event (where she lost to Melanie South in the first round) and attempted to qualify for three consecutive Tier-II tournaments: Antwerp, Dubai (beaten in final round by Kateryna Bondarenko) and Qatar. This was then followed by two first round losses in $25k tournaments and a run to the semifinals of another. In May, she again represented Great Britain in the Fed Cup and again won all three of her singles matches. She beat: Hungarian Kyra Nagy, Bulgaria's Dimana Krastevitch, and Valeria Bondarenko from Ukraine. In the Europe/Africa Play-off however, she lost to Slovakia's Magdaléna Rybáriková. After the Fed Cup, Elena played only one more tournament in 2006. This tournament was the French Open where she lost in round one of qualifying to Yevgenia Savransky. She underwent keyhole surgery on a prolapsed disc on 7 June and spent the rest of the season out-of-action recovering and as a result, her season-ending ranking was world No. 347.

=== 2007–08 ===
By the time Baltacha returned to action in March 2007 after surgery, her singles ranking had fallen to 660 in the world and as such, she had to qualify for her first $25k ITF tournament of the year in Las Palmas de Gran Canaria. She qualified before losing to Sorana Cîrstea in the first round. She then competed in two more $25k events in March (reaching the quarterfinals of one) before heading to Bulgaria to compete in the Fed Cup for Britain. She played two singles matches (winning one) and four doubles matches (winning two). Following this, she reached two consecutive $25k semifinals in Incheon and Gimcheon, one as a qualifier and the other as a lucky loser. She consolidated these results with a run to the quarterfinals of another $25k in Changwon. In June, she received a wildcard into the main draw of the Birmingham Classic where she showed "fighting spirit" in her first round loss to Milagros Sequera. She then received a wildcard into the qualifying draw for the Hastings Direct International and proved she deserved it by dropping only nine games in the three matches she won to qualify. She then went on to beat the British number one, Anne Keothavong, in round one of the main draw in a tense three set match and join fellow Britons, Melanie South and Katie O'Brien in the second round, making this the first year since 1991 that three British women reached the second round. She could not quite match up to world No. 14, Nicole Vaidišová, in the second round though and was beaten in straight sets. She then received another wildcard into the main draw of Wimbledon but wasn't able to overcome the 19th seed, Katarina Srebotnik.

After Wimbledon, Baltacha headed to the United States to compete again on the ITF Circuit where she reached the quarterfinals of the $50k event in Lexington, Kentucky. After being beaten in the first round of qualifying for the US Open by Evgeniya Rodina, Baltacha headed to Japan to attempt to qualify for the Japan Open. She beat María Emilia Salerni, Ágnes Szatmári and Natalie Grandin to qualify and then continued winning by defeating Yan Zi in the first round. She was defeated by No. 5 seed and eventual champion, Virginie Razzano, in round two. This was followed by an unsuccessful attempt to qualify for a Tier-III event in Bangkok and then a return to the ITF Circuit where she reached the semifinals in Makinohara and the quarterfinals in Hamanako (both $25k), losing both times to Seiko Okamoto. Her final singles ranking of 2007 was world No. 187.

Baltacha began her 2008 season by qualifying for the Auckland Open, beating compatriot, Melanie South, along the way. She faced two-time Auckland champion and No. 7 seed, Eleni Daniilidou, in the opening round and was beaten. She then progressed to round two of the qualifying tournament for the Australian Open when her first round opponent, Virginie Pichet, retired when down one set. She was beaten in the second round of qualifying by Zhang Shuai. In February, she tried to qualify for Doha (Tier I) and Dubai (Tier II) but was unsuccessful in both. She then returned to action on the ITF Circuit and won her next two consecutive tournaments: Jersey ($25k) and Torhout ($75k). In May, she again lost in the first round of the qualifying tournament for the French Open and in June she again received a wildcard into the main draw of the Birmingham Classic where she was beaten in round one by Ekaterina Makarova. Another wildcard granted her entry into the qualifying rounds of the International Women's Open where she won her first match against Naomi Cavaday before retiring at one set down in her second match against Tsvetana Pironkova. She then played in the main draw of Wimbledon (again courtesy of a wildcard) where she beat Angelique Kerber in the first round. She was defeated in the second round by eventual semifinalist Zheng Jie, in straight sets.

Baltacha then lost three consecutive matches, before defeating Anna Korzeniak and Carly Gullickson in the first two rounds of qualifying for the US Open. She fell just short of reaching the main draw when she lost to Julie Coin in the final round of qualifying. She played seven more higher-level ITF tournaments over the rest of the year and reached the quarterfinals in one of them: the $50k event in Ismaning where she lost to Julia Görges. Her year-end ranking was world No. 136.

=== 2009 ===
Baltacha began 2009 by falling in the first round of qualifying for the Auckland Open before winning three matches to qualify for the Australian Open. She joined compatriots Katie O'Brien (also a qualifier), Anne Keothavong and Melanie South in the main draw; the first time that four British women had competed in the main draw of a Grand Slam other than Wimbledon since the 1992 US Open. Baltacha came up against German Anna-Lena Grönefeld in the first round and defeated her comfortably to set up a clash with former world No. 1, Amélie Mauresmo. Despite surprising many by taking the first set, Baltacha eventually lost in three sets.

February saw Baltacha represent her country in the Fed Cup where she won all three of her singles rubbers in straight sets. In April, Baltacha was the top seed in the $75k ITF tournament in Monzón where she reached the quarterfinals before losing to former world No. 4, Kimiko Date-Krumm in a close three-set match. Later that month she reached the final of a $25k where she faced the No. 6 seed, Junri Namigata, and won to give her the sixth ITF singles title of her career. In May, she reached the semifinals of a $50k in Fukuoka before going on to reach the final round of qualifying for the French Open, where she lost to Yaroslava Shvedova. Between the French Open and Wimbledon, she reached the semifinals of another $50k and reached the second round of the Eastbourne Classic. She beat Georgie Stoop in the first round before falling in an epic three-set battle with the then world No. 27, Anastasia Pavlyuchenkova. She received a wildcard into the main draw of Wimbledon where she came up against world No. 33, Alona Bondarenko, in the first round. Baltacha managed to come back from a set down to win in three sets. She then went on to lose to Kirsten Flipkens in round two.

This was followed by three consecutive losses in the first round of qualifying for WTA events before Baltacha won two matches to qualify for the Rogers Cup, a Premier tournament. She faced former world No. 1, Kim Clijsters, in the second tournament of her comeback and lost to the Belgian in straight sets. Following this, she reached the final round of qualifying for the US Open before going on to win the $75k in Shrewsbury. She beat fellow Brit, Katie O'Brien, in the final. This result was enough to put both finalists into the top 100 for the first time in each of their careers. After this, Baltacha reached the semifinals of one more $50k, the second round of a $100k (where she had to withdraw due to food poisoning) and the quarterfinals of a $75k tournament. These showings helped her accumulate enough points to catapult her back to the British number-one spot. Her year-end ranking was world No. 87.

=== 2010 ===
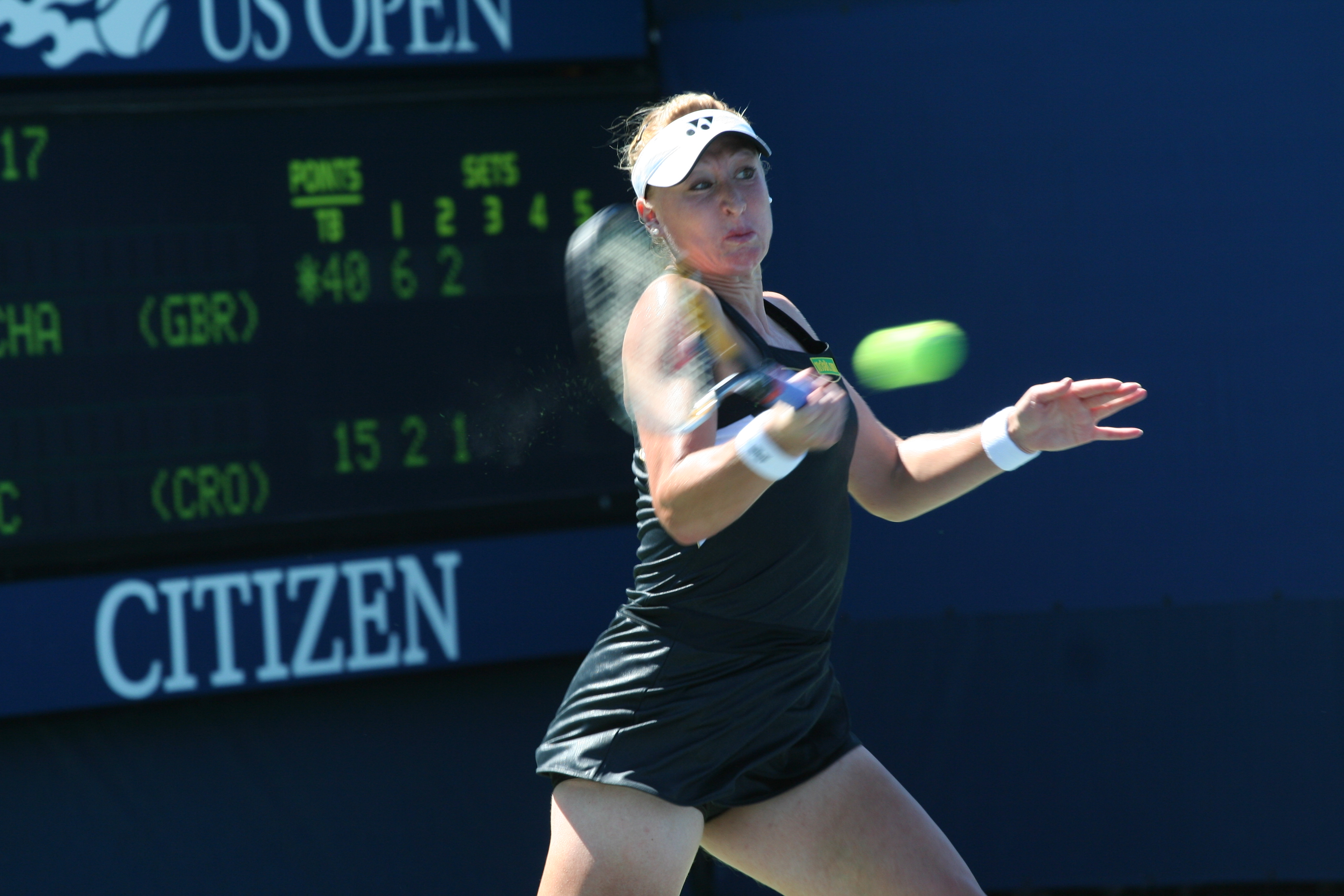
Baltacha winning her first match at the US Open and breaking into the top 50

Baltacha began her 2010 season by winning three matches to qualify for the Auckland Open in New Zealand. In the first round of the main draw, she was beaten by Raluca Olaru, in straight sets. She then went on to win another three matches to qualify for the Hobart International before again losing in the first round, this time to resurgent former world No. 4, Jelena Dokić. Her next tournament was the first Grand Slam of the year, the Australian Open. For the first time in her career she was able to gain direct entry into the main draw of the tournament due to her improved ranking. She defeated Pauline Parmentier in the first round. As Baltacha's compatriot, Katie O'Brien, also reached the second round, 2010 marked the first time since 1991 that more than one British woman had reached the second round of the Australian Open. In round two, Elena defeated the 30th seed from Ukraine, Kateryna Bondarenko, but she was beaten in the round of 32 by Dinara Safina, the world No. 2. In the doubles tournament she partnered Līga Dekmeijere to reach the second round. In February, Baltacha participated in the Fed Cup where the British team was competing in the Europe/Africa Zone. She played two singles matches, losing against Sybille Bammer and defeating Sandra Martinović from the Austria team and the Bosnia and Herzegovina team, respectively. She also partnered Sarah Borwell in two doubles matches, winning both.

Following this performance in the Fed Cup, Elena competed in a $100k tournament in Midland, Michigan where she reached the final and defeated Lucie Hradecká to win the biggest title of her career. Baltacha then went on to compete in the Cellular South Cup as the eighth seed. She reached the quarterfinals before losing to the top seed and eventual champion, Maria Sharapova. March saw Baltacha qualify for the Indian Wells Open. After defeating Alexa Glatch in the first round, she faced world No. 10, Li Na, in round two and went on to win the match. This gave Elena the first victory of her career over a player ranked in the top 10. Alicia Molik defeated Baltacha in the third round. In her only other tournament during March, Baltacha had to win two matches to qualify for the Miami Open before going on to lose to Yanina Wickmayer in the second round of the main tournament. After this, she went on to reach the quarterfinals of a $100k tournament in Johannesberg before beginning her clay court season with a loss to Gréta Arn in the first round of the Italian Open, a Premier-5 event. In her final event before the French Open, Baltacha participated in the Internationaux de Strasbourg as the eighth seed but was forced to retire in the second round due to a back injury. In her first round match at the French Open, she was beaten by Agnieszka Radwańska, in straight sets.

Her grass-court season then began and the Nottingham Trophy, a $50k event, gave Baltacha the second title of the year. She didn't drop a set throughout the tournament, including in the final when she faced Carly Gullickson. Baltacha stayed on grass for her next tournament, the Birmingham Classic, where she was the number 12 seed. She was forced to retire after losing the first set in her first round match against Kaia Kanepi. Her next event was the Eastbourne International where during her first-round match with Li Na, the Chinese player had to retire with a leg injury after winning the first set on a tie-break. After a second-round win over another Chinese player, Zheng Jie, she lost to Sam Stosur in three sets in the quarterfinals. Nevertheless, this was the first time since 1983 that a British woman had progressed to the quarterfinals of this tournament. Baltacha then suffered a disappointing first-round loss at Wimbledon. She lost in three sets to Petra Martić, after leading by a set and 5–2.

In the lead up to the US Open, Baltacha played in the İstanbul Cup, where she reached the quarterfinals. Along the way she defeated world No. 8 and reigning French Open champion, Francesca Schiavone, in straight sets, to give her the best win of her career. She was beaten by Andrea Petkovic in the quarterfinals. Baltacha then lost four of her next five matches before participating in the main draw of the US Open for the first time in her career. She managed to exact some revenge by beating Petra Martić in round one however she lost to Petra Kvitová in the second round. Baltacha competed in four more tournaments that year, reaching the second round of the Korea Open and a $100k in Torhout but losing in the qualifying rounds of the Pan Pacific Open and the Kremlin Cup. She had also been selected to represent Scotland at the Commonwealth Games but chose not to participate due to the poor sanitation in the athletes' village, which, as a result of her chronic liver problem, may have left her susceptible to picking up infections. Her year-end singles ranking was world No. 54.

=== 2011 ===
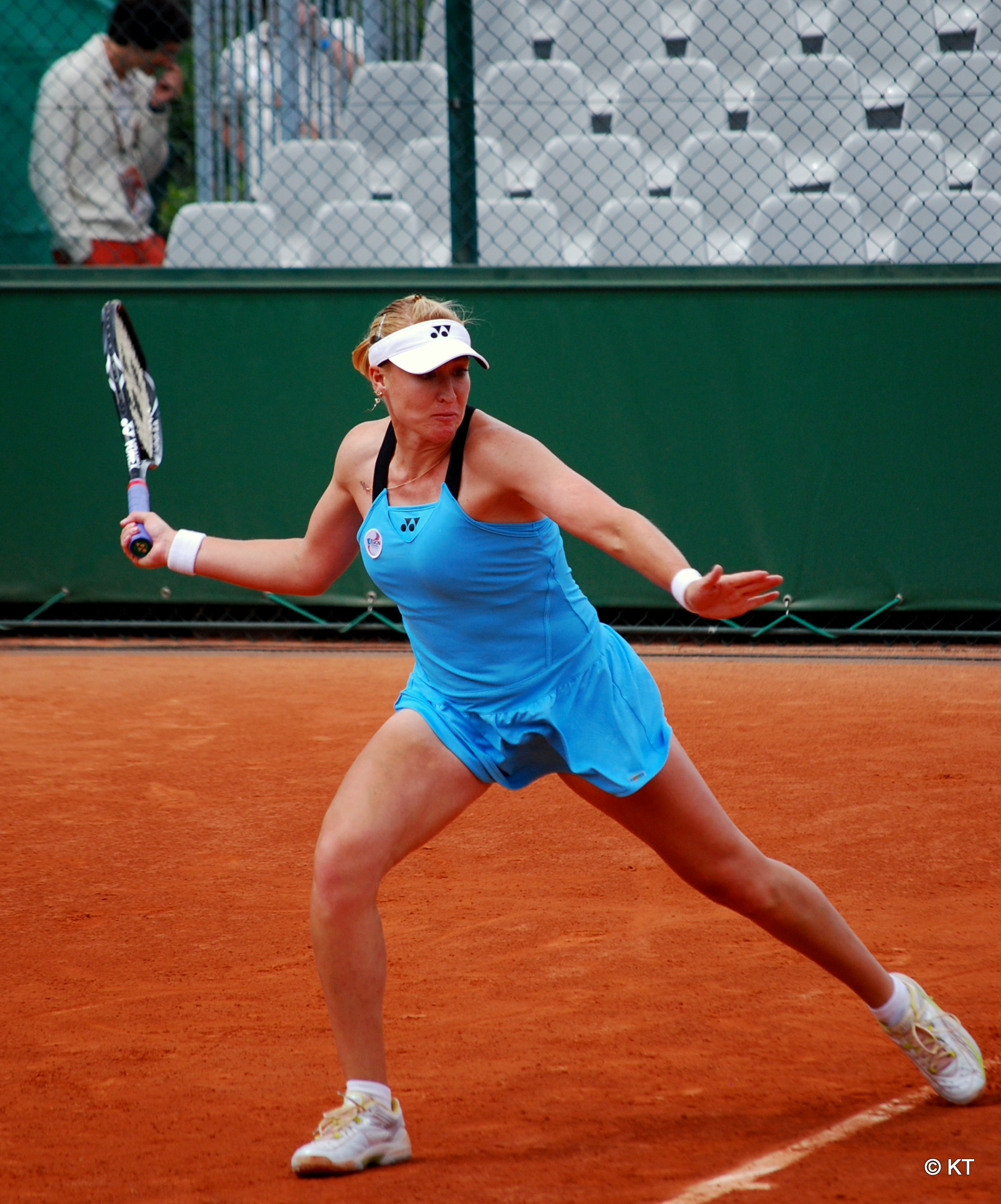
2011

Baltacha began the year at the Hobart International, but lost to Roberta Vinci in the second round. Baltacha then entered the Australian Open without having to qualify. In the first round, she defeated American qualifier Jamie Hampton. In round two, however, she was defeated by former world No. 1 and 2004 Australian Open champion, Justine Henin. Her next tournament was the Pattaya Open, where she lost to sixth seed Peng Shuai.

Baltacha lost in the first round of the Dubai Tennis Championships to Alexandra Dulgheru. She then lost in the second round of qualifying at the Qatar Ladies Open to Klára Zakopalová. In the first round of the Indian Wells Open, Baltacha saved four match points at 2–6, 4–5 in the first round against Roberta Vinci, finally winning in three sets. In the second round she was defeated by 12th seed Flavia Pennetta. In the first round of the Miami Open, Baltacha defeated Sybille Bammer. However, she was defeated in the second round by Klára Zakopalová, the 32nd seed. After direct acceptance into the main draw of the French Open, Baltacha defeated American qualifier Sloane Stephens. Due to the previous win by fellow Briton Heather Watson, it was the first time since 1992 that two British women had cleared the first round of the French Open. In the second round, Baltacha drew another American Vania King, who defeated her in three sets. On 12 June, Baltacha won her first tournament of the season, winning the Nottingham Challenge without dropping a single set throughout the tournament, defeating Petra Cetkovská in the final.

An improvement on the previous years disappointment, Baltacha reached the second round of Wimbledon by a victory over Mona Barthel. She failed to progress, however, losing to the 20th seed, Peng Shuai. She went on to enter the qualifying draw of the Cincinnati Open, but despite being seeded tenth, she lost in the first round against Olga Govortsova. She then went on to the inaugural Texas Tennis Open. She managed first and second round wins over Barbora Záhlavová-Strýcová and third seed Julia Görges before a quarterfinal loss to Aravane Rezaï.

Baltacha's next tournament was the US Open, where in the first round she walked over American wildcard Jamie Hampton. Hampton had to retire unexpectedly due to cramp and dehydration as she collapsed on the base line. She lost to Svetlana Kuznetsova in the second round. Her final tournament of the year was the Internationaux de la Vienne, where she got all the way to the final only to lose to Kimiko Date-Krumm, in straight sets.

=== 2012 ===
Baltacha began 2012 playing at the Auckland Open. She won her first-round match against wildcard and home favourite Sacha Jones in a hard-fought three set encounter but lost in the second round in straight sets to Flavia Pennetta. This was followed by a first-round loss in the Australian Open to Stéphanie Foretz Gacon.

Baltacha was selected for the British Fed Cup team to play in the Europe/Africa Group 1 match in Eilat, Israel on 1–4 February 2012. In the group stages she played singles, defeating opponents from Portugal, the Netherlands and Israel. The team qualified for a play-off against Austria in which Baltacha defeated Tamira Paszek. The team won 2–0, which qualified them for a place in the World Group II promotion play-off in April.

At the French Open, Baltacha faced a tough first round match against US Open champion Sam Stosur on the first match at Court Philippe Chatrier (Centre Court) of the Open. Stosur won without dropping a set. Baltacha did however have a better run at Wimbledon, making the second round but lost to the previous year's champion Petra Kvitová in straight sets. In the first round, she had come through a gruelling three setter against Karin Knapp, despite carrying shin splints and picking up an injury during the match. Baltacha competed at the Summer Olympics in London for the first time in her career in both the singles and the doubles events (partnering Anne Keothavong). On 28 July 2012, Baltacha made her Olympics debut with a win against Ágnes Szávay of Hungary, defeating her in straight sets. She was then defeated by 11th seed Ana Ivanovic in the second round in a very tight encounter. This was Baltacha's last professional match of 2012, taking time off to undergo foot surgery.

=== 2013 ===
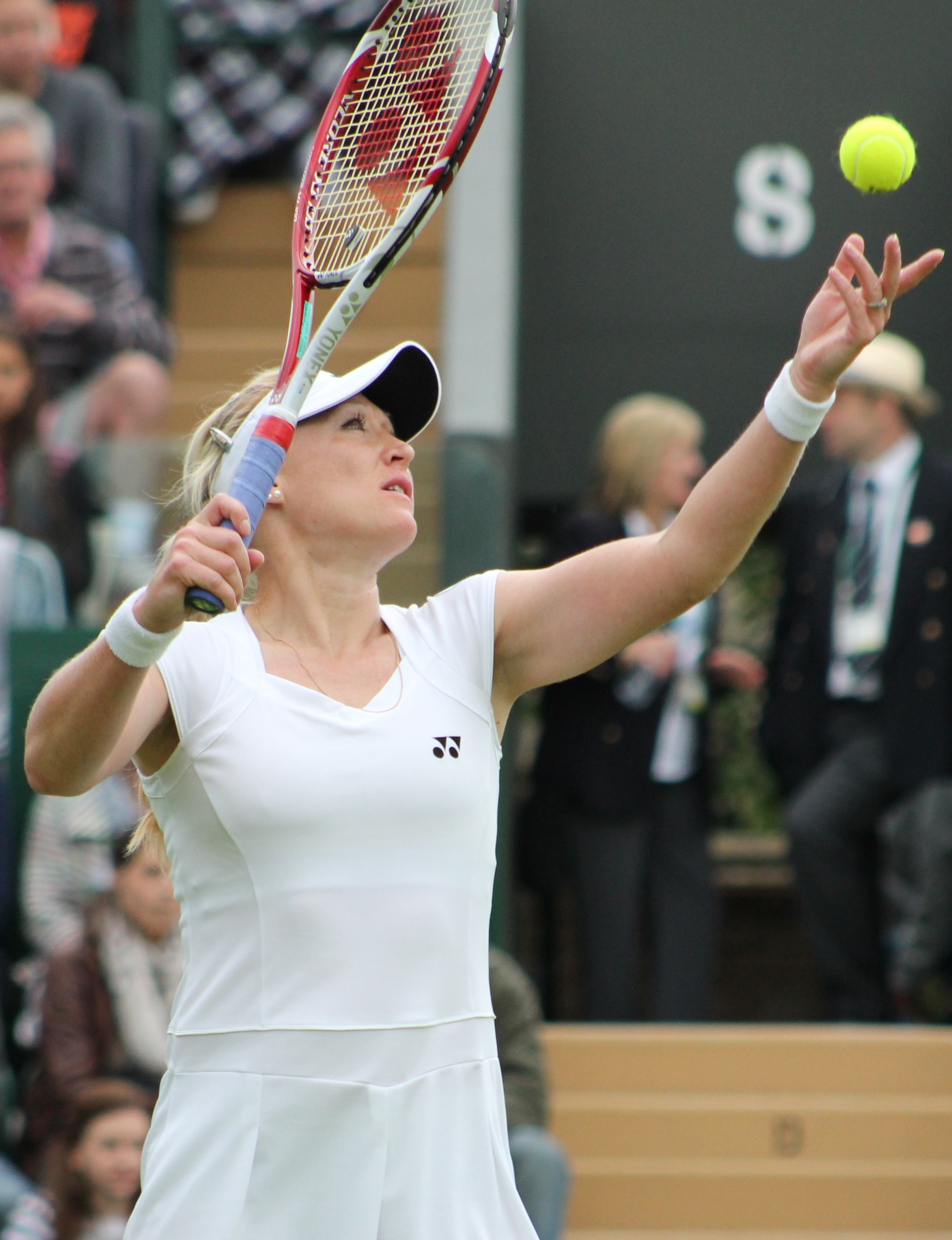
Baltacha at Wimbledon in 2013

Baltacha's first tournament back after surgery was a $25k tournament in Pelham, Alabama, where she was a direct entrant into the main draw. She withdrew against Sharon Fichman in round one.

An illness to Heather Watson meant that Baltacha made British Fed Cup World Group II play-off team to face Argentina. Baltacha replaced Johanna Konta to play one of the singles rubbers on the final day of the play-off. Laura Robson's defeat in the third rubber meant that Baltacha had to gain a victory over María Irigoyen. Baltacha lost in three sets, meaning that Great Britain would have to return to the Europe/Africa Group and attempt to qualify again next February.

Baltacha was handed a wildcard at the Brussels Open a week before Roland Garros. In the first round, she surprisingly defeated Stefanie Vögele but lost to the seventh seeded Varvara Lepchenko, in straight sets. At the French Open, Baltacha used her protected rankings points to earn a place in the first round. She was beaten in straight sets by Marina Erakovic. Following this defeat, Baltacha was handed a wildcard to play at the Nottingham Trophy, an ITF event in Nottingham, but again lost in the first round to sixth seed Vesna Dolonc.

Baltacha reached her first final of 2013 at the Nottingham Challenge following an impressive straight-sets victory over Italian Nastassja Burnett in the semifinals. She then beat the seventh seed Tadeja Majerič in the final in straight sets coming from behind in the first 2–5 down to claim her third title at Nottingham. Baltacha followed this success with a victory in the first round of the Birmingham Classic against Czech qualifier Kristýna Plíšková but was eliminated in the second round by Maria Kirilenko.

Baltacha retired from professional tennis in November 2013.

== ITF Circuit finals ==
=== Singles: 14 (11 titles, 3 runner-ups) ===
Legend $100,000 tournaments (2–1) $75,000 tournaments (2–0) $50,000 tournaments (2–0) $25,000 tournaments (5–2)	Finals by surface Hard (7–3) Grass (4–0)

Outcome	Date	Tier	Tournament	Surface	Opponent	Score
Winner	8 July 2002	25,000	Felixstowe, United Kingdom	Grass	(Republic of Ireland) Kelly Liggan	4–6, 6–2, 6–3
Winner	22 July 2002	25,000	Pamplona, Spain	Hard (i)	(France) Virginie Pichet	6–2, 6–1
Runner-up	20 September 2004	25,000	Jersey, United Kingdom	Hard (i)	(Finland) Emma Laine	6–3, 2–6, 1–6
Runner-up	9 February 2005	25,000	Redbridge, United Kingdom	Hard (i)	(Croatia) Nika Ožegović	0–6, 3–6
Winner	12 October 2005	25,000	Jersey, United Kingdom	Hard (i)	(Austria) Daniela Kix	4–6, 4–6
Winner	26 March 2008	25,000	Jersey, United Kingdom	Hard (i)	(Croatia) Ana Vrljić	6–1, 6–3
Winner	1 April 2008	75,000	Torhout, Belgium	Hard (i)	(Czech Republic) Iveta Benešová	6–7^{(5)}, 6–1, 6–4
Winner	21 April 2009	25,000	Changwon, Korea	Hard	(Japan) Junri Namigata	6–3, 6–1
Winner	22 September 2009	75,000	GB Pro-Series Shrewsbury, UK	Hard (i)	(United Kingdom) Katie O'Brien	6–3, 4–6, 6–3
Winner	9 February 2010	100,000	Midland Classic, United States	Hard (i)	(Czech Republic) Lucie Hradecká	5–7, 6–2, 6–3
Winner	31 May 2010	50,000	Nottingham Trophy, UK	Grass	(United States) Carly Gullickson	6–2, 6–2
Winner	12 June 2011	100,000+H	Nottingham Challenge, UK	Grass	(Czech Republic) Petra Cetkovská	7–5, 6–3
Runner-up	30 October 2011	100,000	ITF Poitiers, France	Hard (i)	(Japan) Kimiko Date-Krumm	6–7^{(3)}, 4–6
Winner	16 June 2013	50,000	Nottingham Challenge, UK	Grass	(Slovenia) Tadeja Majerič	7–5, 7–6^{(7)}

=== Doubles: 8 (4 titles, 4 runner-ups) ===
Legend $50,000 tournaments $25,000 tournaments (4–3) $10,000 tournaments (0–1)	Finals by surface Hard (4–2) Clay (0–1) Grass (0–1)

Outcome	Date	Tier	Tournament	Surface	Partnering	Opponent	Score
Runner-up	30 April 2001	10,000	Hatfield, UK	Clay	(United Kingdom) Nicola Trinder	(Russia) Natalia Egorova (Russia) Ekaterina Sysoeva	3–6, 6–4, 1–6
Winner	15 July 2002	25,000	Valladolid, Spain	Hard	(Madagascar) Natacha Randriantefy	(New Zealand) Leanne Baker (India) Manisha Malhotra	6–2, 6–3
Winner	22 July 2002	25,000	Pamplona, Spain	Hard (i)	(Republic of Ireland) Kelly Liggan	(Republic of Ireland) Yvonne Doyle (Netherlands) Susanne Trik	6–7^{(6)}, 7–6^{(1)}, 6–3
Winner	11 October 2004	25,000	Sunderland, UK	Hard (i)	(United Kingdom) Jane O'Donoghue	(Slovakia) Eva Fislová (Slovakia) Stanislava Hrozenská	6–1, 4–6, 6–2
Winner	22 September 2005	25,000	GB Pro-Series Glasgow, UK	Hard (i)	(Estonia) Margit Rüütel	(United Kingdom) Anne Keothavong (United Kingdom) Karen Paterson	6–3, 6–7^{(2)}, 6–2
Runner-up	21 March 2006	25,000	Redding, United States	Hard	(Israel) Yevgenia Savransky	(Russia) Vasilisa Bardina (United States) Ahsha Rolle	7–5, 5–7, 4–6
Runner-up	4 June 2007	25,000	Surbiton Trophy, UK	Grass	(United Kingdom) Naomi Cavaday	(United Kingdom) Karen Paterson (United Kingdom) Melanie South	1–6, 4–6
Runner-up	21 April 2009	25,000	Changwon, Korea	Hard	(United Kingdom) Amanda Elliott	(Chinese Taipei) Chang Kai-chen (Chinese Taipei) Chen Yi	4–6, 1–6

== Performance timelines ==
Key
W	F	SF	QF	#R	RR	Q#	DNQ	A	NH

(W) winner; (F) finalist; (SF) semifinalist; (QF) quarterfinalist; (#R) rounds 4, 3, 2, 1; (RR) round-robin stage; (Q#) qualification round; (DNQ) did not qualify; (A) absent; (NH) not held; (SR) strike rate (events won / competed); (W–L) win–loss record.

=== Singles ===
Tournament	2001	2002	2003	2004	2005	2006	2007	2008	2009	2010	2011	2012	2013	SR	W–L	Win %
Grand Slam tournaments
Australian Open	A	A	1R	A	3R	Q2	A	Q2	2R	3R	2R	1R	A	0 / 6	6–6	50%
French Open	A	A	Q1	A	Q1	Q1	A	Q1	Q3	1R	2R	1R	1R	0 / 4	1–4	20%
Wimbledon	1R	3R	1R	2R	1R	A	1R	2R	2R	1R	2R	2R	1R	0 / 12	7–12	37%
US Open	Q1	Q1	A	Q2	Q1	A	Q1	Q3	Q3	2R	2R	A	Q3	0 / 2	2–2	50%
Win–loss	0–1	2–1	0–2	1–1	2–2	0–0	0–1	1–1	2–2	3–4	4–4	1–3	0–2	0 / 24	16–24	40%
Olympic Games
Summer Olympics	Not Held			A	Not Held			A	Not Held			2R	NH	0 / 1	1–1	50%
Year-end championships
WTA Tour Championships	A													0 / 0	0–0	0%
Premier Mandatory tournaments
Indian Wells	A									3R	2R	2R	A	0 / 3	4–3	57%
Miami	A				Q2	A			Q1	2R	2R	1R	A	0 / 3	2–3	40%
Madrid	Not Held								A					0 / 0	0–0	0%
Beijing	Not Tier I								A					0 / 0	0–0	0%
Premier 5 tournaments
Dubai	Not Tier I								A		1R	NP5		0 / 1	0–1	0%
Rome	A				Q1	A				Q1	A			0 / 0	0–0	0%
Cincinnati	Not Tier I								Q1	Q1	Q1	A		0 / 0	0–0	0%
Canada	A								1R	Q1	Q2	A		0 / 1	0–1	0%
Tokyo	A									Q2	A			0 / 0	0–0	0%
Titles/Finals	0–0	0–0	0–0	0–0	0–0	0–0	0–0	0–0	0–0	0–0	0–0	0–0	0–0	0–0		
Year-end ranking	242	157	373	202	122	347	187	136	89	55	50	172	220	$1,190,893		

=== Women's doubles ===
Tournament	2001	2002	2003	2004	2005	2006	2007	2008	2009	2010	2011	2012	Career W–L
Australian Open	A	A	A	A	A	A	A	A	A	2R	A	A	1–1
French Open	A	A	A	A	A	A	A	A	A	A	A	A	0–0
Wimbledon	1R	1R	1R	1R	2R	A	1R	1R	1R	2R	A	1R	2–10
US Open	A	A	A	A	A	A	A	A	A	A	A	A	0–0
Year-end ranking	405	262	490	355	246	508	365	961	648	N/A	N/A	N/A	N/A

=== Mixed doubles ===
Tournament	2002	2003	2004	2005	2006	2007	2008	2009	2010	2011	Career W–L
Australian Open	A	A	A	A	A	A	A	A	A	A	0–0
French Open	A	A	A	A	A	A	A	A	A	A	0–0
Wimbledon	3R	1R	A	1R	A	A	1R	2R	2R	2R	5–7
US Open	A	A	A	A	A	A	A	A	A	A	0–0

=== Fed Cup ===
Europe/Africa Group II
Date	Venue	Surface	Round	Opponents	Final match score	Match	Opponent	Rubber score
09–13 April 2002	Pretoria	Hard	RR	Malta	3–0	Doubles (with Julie Pullin)	Dimech/Wetz	6–0, 6–1 (W)
09–13 April 2002	Pretoria	Hard	RR	Norway	3–0	Singles	Annette Aksdal	6–0, 6–1 (W)
09–13 April 2002	Pretoria	Hard	PO (Promotion)	Lithuania	2–0	Singles	Lina Stančiūtė	4–6, 6–2, 6–2 (W)
Europe/Africa Group I
21–26 April 2003	Estoril	Clay	RR	Ireland	2–1	Doubles (with Julie Pullin)	Curran/Liggan	6–3, 6–2 (W)
21–26 April 2003	Estoril	Clay	RR	Poland	2–1	Doubles (with Julie Pullin)	Domachowska/Bieleń-Żarska	6–4, 7–6^{(7–5)} (W)
21–26 April 2003	Estoril	Clay	RR	Hungary	0–3	Singles	Petra Mandula	1–6, 3–6 (L)
21–26 April 2003	Estoril	Clay	PO (Relegation)	Netherlands	1–2	Doubles (with Julie Pullin)	Boogert/Oremans	3–6, 4–6 (L)
Europe/Africa Group II
26 Apr – 1 May 2004	Marsa	Hard	RR	Egypt	3–0	Doubles (with Jane O'Donoghue)	Farid/Mohsen	6–0, 6–3 (W)
26 Apr – 1 May 2004	Marsa	Hard	RR	Turkey	3–0	Singles	Cigdem Duru	6–1, 6–0 (W)
26 Apr – 1 May 2004	Marsa	Hard	RR	Turkey	3–0	Doubles (with Jane O'Donoghue)	Büyükakçay/Özgen	6–0, 6–3 (W)
26 Apr – 1 May 2004	Marsa	Hard	RR	Romania	2–1	Singles	Monica Niculescu	6–1, 6–4 (W)
26 Apr – 1 May 2004	Marsa	Hard	PO (Promotion)	Ireland	2–0	Singles	Yvonne Doyle	6–1, 7–5 (W)
Europe/Africa Group I
20–23 April 2005	Antalya	Clay	RR	Slovenia	0–3	Singles	Katarina Srebotnik	1–6, 1–6 (L)
20–23 April 2005	Antalya	Clay	RR	Slovenia	0–3	Doubles (with Jane O'Donoghue)	Klepač/Križan	1–6, 4–6 (L)
20–23 April 2005	Antalya	Clay	RR	Denmark	2–1	Singles	Karina Ildor Jacobsgaard	6–3, 7–5 (W)
20–23 April 2005	Antalya	Clay	RR	Serbia and Montenegro	1–2	Singles	Ana Timotić	7–5, 3–6, 0–6 (L)
20–23 April 2005	Antalya	Clay	PO (9th–12th)	Ukraine	1–2	Singles	Alona Bondarenko	1–6, 3–6 (L)
18–22 April 2006	Plovdiv	Clay	RR	Ukraine	3–0	Singles	Valeria Bondarenko	6–3, 6–0 (W)
18–22 April 2006	Plovdiv	Clay	RR	Ukraine	3–0	Doubles (with Claire Curran)	Antypina/V.Bondarenko	6–4, 6–4 (W)
18–22 April 2006	Plovdiv	Clay	RR	Bulgaria	2–1	Singles	Dimana Krastevitch	6–3, 6–1 (W)
18–22 April 2006	Plovdiv	Clay	RR	Bulgaria	2–1	Doubles (with Claire Curran)	Krastevitch/Pironkova	6–1, 1–6, 6–2 (W)
18–22 April 2006	Plovdiv	Clay	RR	Hungary	2–1	Singles	Kyra Nagy	6–1, 6–2 (W)
18–22 April 2006	Plovdiv	Clay	RR	Hungary	2–1	Doubles (with Claire Curran)	Nagy/Németh	6–1, 7–6^{(7–5)} (W)
18–22 April 2006	Plovdiv	Clay	PO (1st–4th)	Slovakia	1–2	Singles	Magdaléna Rybáriková	5–7, 3–6 (L)
18–22 April 2006	Plovdiv	Clay	PO (1st–4th)	Slovakia	1–2	Doubles (with Claire Curran)	Cibulková/Husárová	6–4, 6–3 (W)
18–21 April 2007	Plovdiv	Clay	RR	Bulgaria	3–0	Singles	Dia Evtimova	4–6, 6–4, 8–6 (W)
18–21 April 2007	Plovdiv	Clay	RR	Bulgaria	3–0	Doubles (with Claire Curran)	Alawi/Mladenova	6–4, 6–2 (W)
18–21 April 2007	Plovdiv	Clay	RR	Luxembourg	1–2	Doubles (with Claire Curran)	Kremer/Philippe	6–4, 3–6, 6–3 (W)
18–21 April 2007	Plovdiv	Clay	RR	Poland	0–3	Singles	Marta Domachowska	1–6, 4–6 (L)
18–21 April 2007	Plovdiv	Clay	RR	Poland	0–3	Doubles (with Claire Curran)	Domachowska/A.Radwańska	3–6, 4–6 (L)
18–21 April 2007	Plovdiv	Clay	PO (9th–12th)	Sweden	0–3	Doubles (with Claire Curran)	Andersson/Larsson	0–6, 1–6 (L)
30 Jan – 1 Feb 2008	Budapest	Carpet (i)	RR	Switzerland	1–2	Doubles (with Melanie South)	Gagliardi/Schnyder	3–6, 3–6 (L)
30 Jan – 1 Feb 2008	Budapest	Carpet (i)	RR	Hungary	1–2	Doubles (with Melanie South)	Arn/Szávay	2–6, 2–6 (L)
30 Jan – 1 Feb 2008	Budapest	Carpet (i)	RR	Denmark	1–2	Doubles (with Anne Keothavong)	Dyrberg/Wozniacki	3–6, 2–6 (L)
04–07 Feb 2009	Tallinn	Carpet (i)	RR	Hungary	3–0	Singles	Gréta Arn	7–5, 6–3 (W)
04–07 Feb 2009	Tallinn	Carpet (i)	RR	Netherlands	3–0	Singles	Michelle Gerards	6–2, 6–4 (W)
04–07 Feb 2009	Tallinn	Carpet (i)	PO (Promotion)	Poland	1–2	Singles	Katarzyna Piter	6–4, 6–1 (W)
03–05 Feb 2010	Lisbon	Hard (i)	RR	Bosnia and Herzegovina	3–0	Singles	Sandra Martinović	6–1, 6–1 (W)
03–05 Feb 2010	Lisbon	Hard (i)	RR	Bosnia and Herzegovina	3–0	Doubles (with Sarah Borwell)	Husarić/Martinović	6–2, 6–4 (W)
03–05 Feb 2010	Lisbon	Hard (i)	RR	Austria	0–3	Singles	Sybille Bammer	3–6, 3–6 (L)
03–05 Feb 2010	Lisbon	Hard (i)	RR	Belarus	2–1	Doubles (with Sarah Borwell)	Govortsova/Poutchek	3–6, 7–5, 6–2 (W)
5 Feb 2011	Eilat	Hard	PO (5th–8th)	Croatia	2–0	Singles	Ajla Tomljanović	6–1, 6–1 (W)
01–04 Feb 2012	Eilat	Hard	RR	Portugal	3–0	Singles	Michelle Larcher de Brito	6–2, 6–3 (W)
01–04 Feb 2012	Eilat	Hard	RR	Netherlands	2–1	Singles	Michaëlla Krajicek	6–3, 6–3 (W)
01–04 Feb 2012	Eilat	Hard	RR	Israel	3–0	Singles	Shahar Pe'er	6–4, 6–3 (W)
01–04 Feb 2012	Eilat	Hard	PO (Promotional)	Austria	2–0	Singles	Tamira Paszek	6–1, 6–4 (W)
World Group II (Play Offs)
21–22 April 2012	Borås	Hard (i)	PO (Promotional)	Sweden	1–4	Singles	Johanna Larsson	1–6, 5–7 (L)
21–22 April 2012	Borås	Hard (i)	PO (Promotional)	Sweden	1–4	Doubles (with Heather Watson)	Allgurin/Melander	7–6^{(7–3)}, 6–1 (W)
20–21 April 2013	Buenos Aires	Clay	PO (Promotional)	Argentina	1–3	Singles	María Irigoyen	5–7, 6–3, 1–6 (L)

== Head-to-head record ==
=== Record against top 10 players ===
Player	Record	Win %	Hard	Clay	Grass	Carpet	Last match
Number 1 ranked players
(Germany) Angelique Kerber	1–0	100%	0–0	0–0	1–0	0–0	Won (6–3, 2–6, 7–5) at 2008 Wimbledon Championships
(Russia) Maria Sharapova	0–1	0%	0–1	0–0	0–0	0–0	Lost (2–6, 5–7) at 2010 Cellular South Cup
(Romania) Simona Halep	0–1	0%	0–1	0–0	0–0	0–0	Lost (4–6, 7–5, 2–6) at 2010 $100k+H Torhout, Belgium
(Serbia and Montenegro) / (Serbia) Ana Ivanovic	0–1	0%	0–0	0–0	0–1	0–0	Lost (4–6, 6–7^{(5–7)}) at 2012 Summer Olympics
(Russia) Dinara Safina	0–1	0%	0–1	0–0	0–0	0–0	Lost (1–6, 2–6) at 2010 Australian Open
(France) Amélie Mauresmo	0–1	0%	0–1	0–0	0–0	0–0	Lost (6–4, 3–6, 2–6) at 2009 Australian Open
(Belarus) Victoria Azarenka	0–1	0%	0–0	0–0	0–1	0–0	Lost (1–6, 6–7^{(0–7)}) at 2010 Eastbourne International
(Belgium) Kim Clijsters	0–1	0%	0–1	0–0	0–0	0–0	Lost (3–6, 4–6) at 2009 Canadian Open
(Serbia and Montenegro) / (Serbia) Jelena Janković	0–1	0%	0–1	0–0	0–0	0–0	Lost (5–7, 1–6) at 2002 $25k Lawrenceville, GA
(United States) Jennifer Capriati	0–1	0%	0–0	0–0	0–1	0–0	Lost (4–6, 4–6) at 2004 Wimbledon Championships
(Belgium) Justine Henin	0–1	0%	0–1	0–0	0–0	0–0	Lost (1–6, 3–6) at 2011 Australian Open
Number 2 ranked players
(China) Li Na	2–2	50%	1–1	0–0	1–1	0–0	Lost (3–6, 2–6) at 2010 Danish Open
(Czech Republic) Petra Kvitová	1–3	25%	1–1	0–1	0–1	0–0	Lost (0–6, 4–6) at 2012 Wimbledon Championships
(Russia) Svetlana Kuznetsova	0–1	0%	0–1	0–0	0–0	0–0	Lost (4–6, 3–6) at 2011 US Open
(Spain) Conchita Martínez	0–2	0%	0–0	0–0	0–2	0–0	Lost (5–7, 6–2, 1–6) at 2005 Eastbourne International
(Poland) Agnieszka Radwańska	0–3	0%	0–2	0–1	0–0	0–0	Lost (0–6, 6–7^{(4–7)}) at 2011 Southern California Open
Number 3 ranked players
(South Africa) Amanda Coetzer	1–0	100%	0–0	0–0	1–0	0–0	Won (5–7, 6–4, 6–2) at 2002 Wimbledon Championships
(United States) Sloane Stephens	1–0	100%	0–0	1–0	0–0	0–0	Won (7–5, 6–2) at 2011 French Open
Number 4 ranked players
(Italy) Francesca Schiavone	1–0	100%	1–0	0–0	0–0	0–0	Won (6–4, 6–2) at 2010 İstanbul Cup
(Australia) Samantha Stosur	1–3	25%	0–0	0–1	1–2	0–0	Lost (4–6, 0–6) at 2012 French Open
(Slovakia) Dominika Cibulková	0–1	0%	0–1	0–0	0–0	0–0	Lost (6–4, 6–7^{(3–7)}, 0–1 ret.) at 2011 Linz Open
(France) Caroline Garcia	0–1	0%	0–1	0–0	0–0	0–0	Lost (5–7, 6–7^{(7–9)}) at 2013 Connecticut Open
(Federal Republic of Yugoslavia) / (Australia) Jelena Dokić	0–2	0%	0–1	0–0	0–1	0–0	Lost (4–6, 2–6) at 2010 Hobart International
(Japan) Kimiko Date	0–2	0%	0–1	0–0	0–1	0–0	Lost (6–7^{(3–7)}, 4–6) at 2011 $100k Poitiers, France
Number 5 ranked players
(Russia) Anna Chakvetadze	1–0	100%	1–0	0–0	0–0	0–0	Won (7–5, 7–6^{(7–3)}) at 2010 Auckland Open
(Czech Republic) Lucie Šafářová	0–1	0%	0–1	0–0	0–0	0–0	Lost (3–6, 6–7^{(5–7)}) at 2008 $100k Poitiers, France
Number 6 ranked players
(Italy) Flavia Pennetta	0–4	0%	0–2	0–0	0–2	0–0	Lost (4–6, 1–6) at 2013 Wimbledon Championships
Number 7 ranked players
(Italy) Roberta Vinci	1–1	50%	1–1	0–0	0–0	0–0	Won (2–6, 7–5, 6–2) at 2011 Indian Wells Open
(Czech Republic) Nicole Vaidišová	0–1	0%	0–0	0–0	0–1	0–0	Lost (3–6, 2–6) at 2007 Eastbourne International
Number 8 ranked players
(Russia) Ekaterina Makarova	2–1	67%	2–0	0–0	0–1	0–0	Lost (5–7, 6–7^{(1–7)}) at 2008 Birmingham Classic
(Australia) Alicia Molik	0–1	0%	0–1	0–0	0–0	0–0	Lost (0–6, 2–6) at 2010 Indian Wells Open
Number 9 ranked players
(Germany) Julia Görges	1–3	25%	1–2	0–0	0–0	0–1	Lost (3–6, 2–6) at 2012 Indian Wells Open
(Germany) Andrea Petkovic	0–2	0%	0–1	0–1	0–0	0–0	Lost (4–6, 0–6) at 2010 İstanbul Cup
Number 10 ranked players
(Russia) Maria Kirilenko	0–3	0%	0–1	0–1	0–1	0–0	Lost (6–4, 4–6, 3–6) at 2013 Eastbourne International
Total	13–47	22%	8–25 (24%)	1–5 (17%)	4–16 (20%)	0–1 (0%)	

=== Top 10 wins ===
Season	1997	1998	1999	2000	2001	2002	2003	2004	2005	2006	2007	2008	2009	2010	2011	2012	2013	Total
Wins	0	0	0	0	0	0	0	0	0	0	0	0	0	3	0	0	0	3

#	Player	Rank	Event	Surface	Rd.	Score
2010
1.	(China) Li Na	No. 10	Indian Wells Open	Hard	2R	7–6^{(6)}, 2–6, 7–6^{(7)}
2.	(China) Li Na	No. 10	Eastbourne International	Grass	1R	6–7^{(6)}, ret.
3.	(Italy) Francesca Schiavone	No. 8	İstanbul Cup	Hard	2R	6–4, 6–2

Preceded by Julie Pullin; Anne Keothavong; Katie O'Brien	British Tennis number one 23 September 2002 – 15 June 2003; 17 January 2005 – 29 January 2006; 30 November 2009 – 10 June 2012	Succeeded by Anne Keothavong; Anne Keothavong; Anne Keothavong
