= 2012 Nottingham Challenge – Women's singles =

Women's singles
- 2012 Nottingham Challenge

Final
- Champion: (Australia) Ashleigh Barty
- Runner-up: (Germany) Tatjana Malek
- Score: 6–1, 6–1

Events
Singles	men	women
Doubles	men	women
- Nottingham Challenge

Elena Baltacha was the defending champion, but chose to participate at the 2012 Birmingham Classic instead.

Ashleigh Barty won the title, defeating Tatjana Malek in the final 6–1, 6–1.

== Seeds ==
1. (Belarus) Anastasiya Yakimova (semifinals)
2. (Czech Republic) Karolína Plíšková (semifinals)
3. (Russia) Valeria Savinykh (second round)
4. (Japan) Erika Sema (first round)
5. (Russia) Vitalia Diatchenko (second round)
6. (France) Claire Feuerstein (first round)
7. (Italy) Camila Giorgi (second round)
8. (Romania) Mihaela Buzărnescu (quarterfinals)

== Draw ==
Key

- Q = Qualifier
- WC = Wild card
- LL = Lucky loser
- Alt = Alternate
- ITF = ITF entry
- PR = Protected ranking
- SR = Special ranking
- SE = Special exempt
- JE = Junior exempt
- JR = Junior Accelerator Programme entrant
- CO = College Accelerator Programme entrant
- NG = Next Gen Accelerator Program entrant
- w/o = Walkover
- r = Retired
- d = Defaulted

=== Finals ===
Semifinals
1	(Belarus) Anastasiya Yakimova	3	6	2
(Germany) Tatjana Malek	6	2	6
JE	(Australia) Ashleigh Barty	2	6	7^{8}
2	(Czech Republic) Karolína Plíšková	6	3	6^{6}

Final
(Germany) Tatjana Malek	1	1
JE	(Australia) Ashleigh Barty	6	6

=== Top half ===
First round
1	(Belarus) A Yakimova	6	6
(United States) T Luzhanska	2	2
Q	(Switzerland) C Perrin	3	4
(Romania) M Gojnea	6	6
Q	(Russia) M Sirotkina	6	6
WC	(United Kingdom) K Dunne	2	4
WC	(United Kingdom) L Whybourn	7^{7}	0	7^{7}
6	(France) C Feuerstein	6^{1}	6	6^{3}
4	(Japan) E Sema	2	0
(Serbia) V Dolonc	6	6
(Germany) T Malek	4	6	6
Q	(Portugal) MJ Koehler	6	3	4
(Hungary) R-L Jani	3	7^{7}	4
(Switzerland) A Sadiković	6	6^{2}	6
(United States) M Keys	4	6	1
5	(Russia) V Diatchenko	6	3	6

Second round
1	(Belarus) A Yakimova	7^{7}	6
(Romania) M Gojnea	6^{4}	4
Q	(Russia) M Sirotkina	6	4	6
WC	(United Kingdom) L Whybourn	4	6	3
(Serbia) V Dolonc	6	4	4
(Germany) T Malek	2	6	6
(Switzerland) A Sadiković	6	6
5	(Russia) V Diatchenko	2	4

Quarterfinals
1	(Belarus) A Yakimova	6	6
Q	(Russia) M Sirotkina	4	1
(Germany) T Malek	6^{7}	7^{7}	6
(Switzerland) A Sadiković	7^{9}	6^{5}	4

Semifinals
1	(Belarus) A Yakimova	3	6	2
(Germany) T Malek	6	2	6

=== Bottom half ===
First round
7	(Italy) C Giorgi	4	6	6
(China) S Zheng	6	0	1
(United States) M Brengle	4	6	1
(France) I Pavlovic	6	3	0^{r}
JE	(Australia) A Barty	6	6
(South Africa) C Simmonds	0	3
Q	(Turkey) Ç Büyükakçay	0	7	0
3	(Russia) V Savinykh	6	5	6
8	(Romania) M Buzărnescu	7^{7}	6
(Japan) Y Sema	6^{2}	4
(Czech Republic) Kr Plíšková	6	1	5
WC	(United Kingdom) J Windley	2	6	7
(Russia) E Bychkova	6	6^{4}	6
(United Kingdom) J Konta	3	7^{7}	3
WC	(United Kingdom) A Fitzpatrick	4	5
2	(Czech Republic) Ka Plíšková	6	7

Second round
7	(Italy) C Giorgi	4	6	3
(United States) M Brengle	6	3	6
JE	(Australia) A Barty	6	3	6
3	(Russia) V Savinykh	3	6	2
8	(Romania) M Buzărnescu	6	6
WC	(United Kingdom) J Windley	3	1
(Russia) E Bychkova	3	3
2	(Czech Republic) Ka Plíšková	6	6

Quarterfinals
(United States) M Brengle	6	5	1
JE	(Australia) A Barty	2	7	6
8	(Romania) M Buzărnescu	6	3	5
2	(Czech Republic) Ka Plíšková	4	6	7

Semifinals
JE	(Australia) A Barty	2	6	7^{8}
2	(Czech Republic) Ka Plíšková	6	3	6^{6}
