= 2012 Nottingham Challenge – Women's doubles =

Women's doubles
- 2012 Nottingham Challenge

Final
- Champion: (Australia) Ashleigh Barty (Australia) Sally Peers
- Runner-up: (Hungary) Réka-Luca Jani (Portugal) Maria João Koehler
- Score: 7–6^{(7–2)}, 3–6, [10–5]

Events
Singles	men	women
Doubles	men	women
- Nottingham Challenge

Eva Birnerová and Petra Cetkovská were the defending champions, but both players chose not to participate.
Ashleigh Barty and Sally Peers won the title defeating Réka-Luca Jani and Maria João Koehler in the final 7–6^{(7–2)}, 3–6, [10–5].

== Seeds ==
1. (Czech Republic) Karolína Plíšková / (Czech Republic) Kristýna Plíšková (first round)
2. (Russia) Vitalia Diatchenko / (Russia) Valeria Savinykh (quarterfinals)
3. (Japan) Shuko Aoyama / (Japan) Erika Sema (quarterfinals)
4. (United States) Tetiana Luzhanska / (China) Zheng Saisai (semifinals)

== Draw ==
Key

- Q = Qualifier
- WC = Wild card
- LL = Lucky loser
- Alt = Alternate
- ITF = ITF entry
- PR = Protected ranking
- SR = Special ranking
- SE = Special exempt
- JE = Junior exempt
- JR = Junior Accelerator Programme entrant
- CO = College Accelerator Programme entrant
- NG = Next Gen Accelerator Program entrant
- w/o = Walkover
- r = Retired
- d = Defaulted

=== Draw ===
First round
1	(Czech Republic) Ka Plíšková (Czech Republic) Kr Plíšková	6	6^{7}	[8]
(United States) M Brengle (Switzerland) A Sadiković	3	7^{9}	[10]
WC	(United Kingdom) A Watts (United Kingdom) S Watts	2	2
(Serbia) V Dolonc (France) I Pavlovic	6	6
3	(Japan) S Aoyama (Japan) E Sema	6	6
(Denmark) M Ejdesgaard (Switzerland) C Perrin	0	1
WC	(South Africa) C Simmonds (United Kingdom) N Slater	6^{3}	2
(Hungary) R-L Jani (Portugal) MJ Koehler	7^{7}	6
WC	(United Kingdom) A Fitzpatrick (United Kingdom) J Windley	4	6	[1]
(Australia) D Jeflea (Poland) S Zaniewska	6	3	[10]
(Turkey) Ç Büyükakçay (Russia) M Sirotkina	6^{2}	0
4	(United States) T Luzhanska (China) S Zheng	7^{7}	6
(Germany) T Malek (Japan) Y Sema	3	0
(Australia) A Barty (Australia) S Peers	6	6
(Romania) M Buzărnescu (Romania) M Gojnea	1	2
2	(Russia) V Diatchenko (Russia) V Savinykh	6	6

Quarterfinals
(United States) M Brengle (Switzerland) A Sadiković	w/o
(Serbia) V Dolonc (France) I Pavlovic
3	(Japan) S Aoyama (Japan) E Sema	3	2
(Hungary) R-L Jani (Portugal) MJ Koehler	6	6
(Australia) D Jeflea (Poland) S Zaniewska	6^{6}	1
4	(United States) T Luzhanska (China) S Zheng	7^{8}	6
(Australia) A Barty (Australia) S Peers	6	6
2	(Russia) V Diatchenko (Russia) V Savinykh	2	4

Semifinals
(United States) M Brengle (Switzerland) A Sadiković	4	4
(Hungary) R-L Jani (Portugal) MJ Koehler	6	6
4	(United States) T Luzhanska (China) S Zheng	1	4
(Australia) A Barty (Australia) S Peers	6	6

Finals
(Hungary) R-L Jani (Portugal) MJ Koehler	6^{2}	6	[5]
(Australia) A Barty (Australia) S Peers	7^{7}	3	[10]
