= 2010 İstanbul Cup =

- Date: 26 July – 1 August
- Edition: 6th
- Category: WTA Internationals
- Draw: 32S / 16D
- Prize money: $220,000
- Surface: Hard / outdoor
- Location: Istanbul, Turkey

Champions

Singles
- (Russia) Anastasia Pavlyuchenkova

Doubles
- (Greece) Eleni Daniilidou / (Germany) Jasmin Wöhr
← 2009 ·	İstanbul Cup	· 2014 →

The 2010 İstanbul Cup was a women's tennis tournament played on outdoor hard courts. It was the sixth edition of the İstanbul Cup, and was part of the WTA International tournaments of the 2010 WTA Tour. It took place in Istanbul, Turkey, from 26 July through 1 August 2010. Third-seeded Anastasia Pavlyuchenkova won the singles title.

== Finals ==
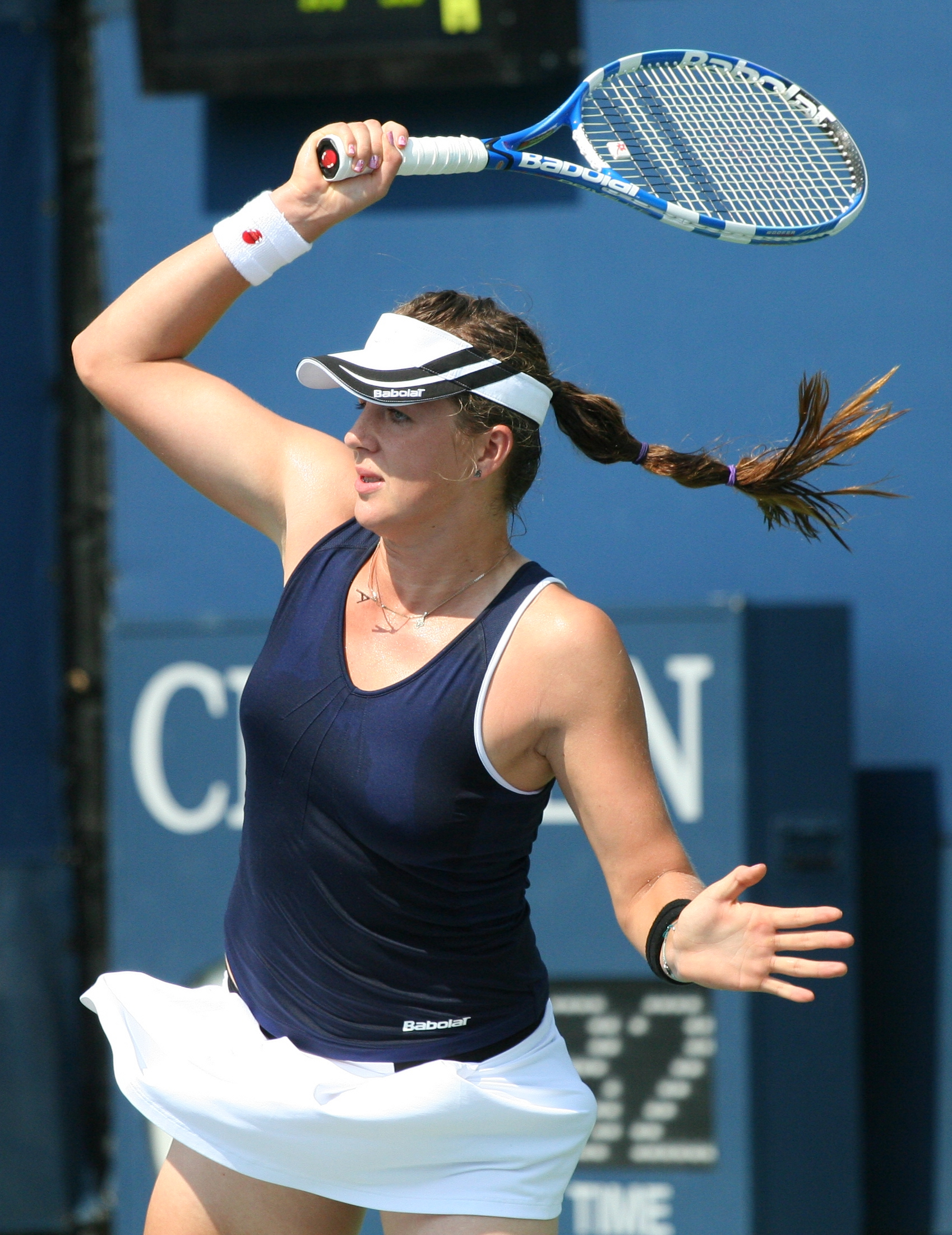
Pavlyuchenkova at the 2010 US Open

=== Singles ===
(Russia) Anastasia Pavlyuchenkova defeated (Russia) Elena Vesnina, 5–7, 7–5, 6–4

- It was Pavlyuchenkova's second title of the year and career.

=== Doubles ===
(Greece) Eleni Daniilidou / (Germany) Jasmin Wöhr defeated (Russia) Maria Kondratieva / (Czech Republic) Vladimíra Uhlířová, 6–4, 1–6, [11–9]

== WTA entrants ==
=== Seeds ===
Player	Nationality	Ranking*	Seed
Francesca Schiavone	Italy	8	1
Petra Kvitová	Czech Republic	30	2
Anastasia Pavlyuchenkova	Russia	31	3
Yaroslava Shvedova	Kazakhstan	32	4
Tsvetana Pironkova	Bulgaria	34	5
Andrea Petkovic	(Germany)	36	6
Klára Zakopalová	Czech Republic	46	7
Patty Schnyder	Switzerland	51	8

- Seedings are based on the rankings of July 19, 2010.

=== Other entrants ===
The following players received wildcards into the singles main draw

- (Turkey) Çağla Büyükakçay
- (Turkey) Başak Eraydın
- (Turkey) Pemra Özgen

The following players received entry from the qualifying draw:

- (Poland) Marta Domachowska
- (Serbia) Bojana Jovanovski
- (Russia) Ekaterina Makarova
- (Germany) Julia Schruff
