= Noel Street tram stop =

Nottingham Express Transit tram stop

Noel Street
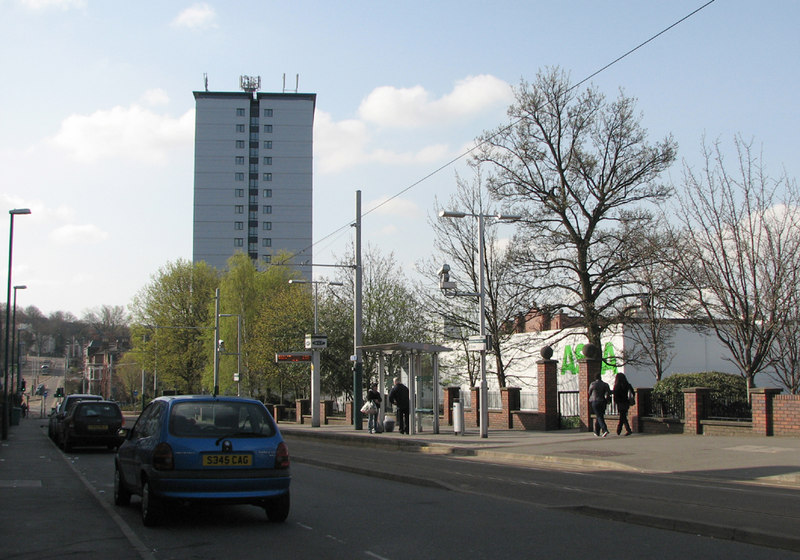

General information
- Location: Hyson Green, City of Nottingham; England
- Coordinates: 52°58′02″N 1°10′07″W
- System: Nottingham Express Transit tram stop
- Owner: Nottingham Express Transit
- Operator: Nottingham Express Transit
- Line: 1 2
- Platforms: 1
- Tracks: 1

Construction
- Structure type: At grade; on roadside reserved track
- Accessible: Step-free access to platform

Key dates
- 9 March 2004: Opened

Services
Preceding station	NET	Following station
Beaconsfield Street towards Hucknall	Line 1	The Forest (From Hyson Green Market) towards Toton Lane
Beaconsfield Street towards Phoenix Park	Line 2	The Forest (From Hyson Green Market) towards Clifton South
Location
- Location within Nottinghamshire
Notes
- Services towards Clifton South and Toton Lane depart from Hyson Green Market ( 190m).

Noel Street is a tram stop on Nottingham Express Transit (NET), in the city of Nottingham suburb of Hyson Green. The tram stop opened on 9 March 2004, along with NET's initial system. It is located on a one way section of the tramway, and is served only by northbound trams; the nearest southbound stop is the Hyson Green Market tram stop. The tram stop is located on a contra-flow reserved track alongside Noel Street, which is at this point one way southbound, and has a single side platform flanking the single track.

With the opening of NET's phase two, Noel Street is now on the common section of the NET, where line 1, between Hucknall and Chilwell, and line 2, between Phoenix Park and Clifton, operate together. Trams on each line run at frequencies that vary between 4 and 8 trams per hour, depending on the day and time of day, combining to provide up to 16 trams per hour on the common section.
