= Shipstone Street tram stop =

Tram stop in Nottingham, England

Shipstone Street
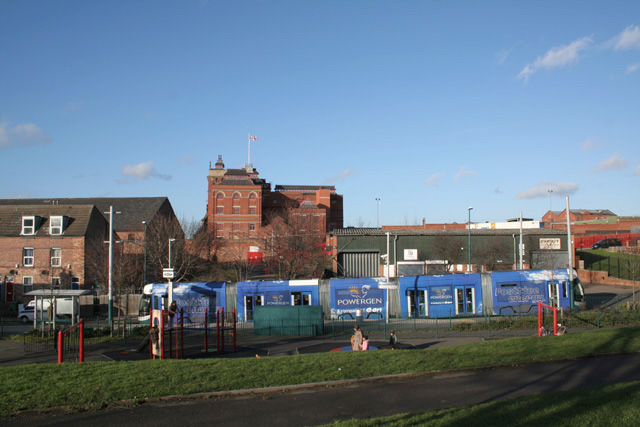

General information
- Location: Hyson Green, City of Nottingham; England
- Coordinates: 52°58′18″N 1°10′24″W
- System: NET tram station
- Owner: Nottingham Express Transit
- Operator: Nottingham Express Transit
- Line: 1 2
- Platforms: 1
- Tracks: 1

Construction
- Structure type: At grade; on street track
- Accessible: Step-free access to platform

Key dates
- 9 March 2004: Opened

Services
Preceding station	NET	Following station
Wilkinson Street towards Hucknall	Line 1	Hyson Green Market (From Radford Road) towards Toton Lane
Wilkinson Street towards Phoenix Park	Line 2	Hyson Green Market (From Radford Road) towards Clifton South
Location
- Location within Nottinghamshire
Notes
- Services towards Clifton South and Toton Lane depart from Radford Road ( 200m).

Shipstone Street is a tram stop on Nottingham Express Transit (NET), in the city of Nottingham suburb of Hyson Green. The tram stop opened on 9 March 2004, along with NET's initial system. It is located on a one way section of the tramway, and is served only by northbound trams; the nearest southbound stop is the Radford Road tram stop. The tram stop is located on street track in Shipstone Street and adjacent to Shipstone Street play area. The stop has a single side platform flanking the single track.

With the opening of NET's phase two, Shipstone Street is now on the common section of the NET, where line 1, between Hucknall and Chilwell, and line 2, between Phoenix Park and Clifton, operate together. Trams on each line run at frequencies that vary between 4 and 8 trams per hour, depending on the day and time of day, combining to provide up to 16 trams per hour on the common section.
