= Wilkinson Street tram stop =

Nottingham Express Transit tram stop

Wilkinson Street
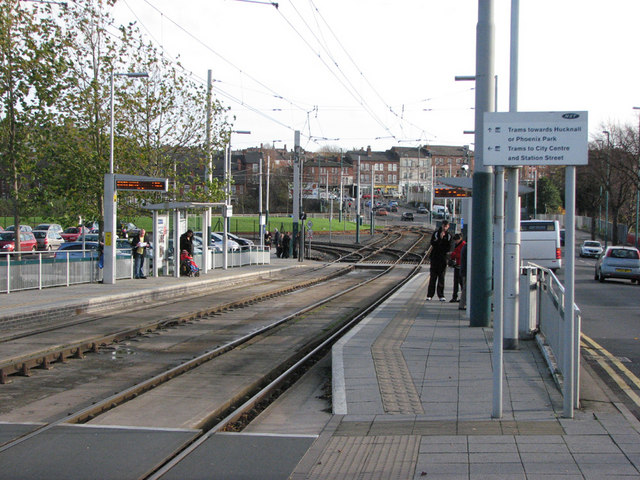

General information
- Location: Basford, City of Nottingham; England
- Coordinates: 52°58′19″N 1°10′42″W
- System: Nottingham Express Transit tram stop
- Owner: Nottingham Express Transit
- Operator: Nottingham Express Transit
- Line: 1 2
- Platforms: 2
- Tracks: 2

Construction
- Structure type: At grade; on roadside reserved track
- Accessible: Step-free access to platform

Key dates
- 9 March 2004: Opened

Services
| Preceding station | NET | Following station |
|---|---|---|
| Basford towards Hucknall | Line 1 | Radford Road towards Toton Lane |
| Basford towards Phoenix Park | Line 2 | Radford Road towards Clifton South |
Location
- Location within Nottinghamshire

Wilkinson Street is a tram stop on Nottingham Express Transit (NET), in the city of Nottingham suburb of Basford. The tram stop opened on 9 March 2004, along with NET's initial system. It is one of several park and ride stops on the NET network, with more than 600 car parking spaces located next to the stop. NET's Wilkinson Street depot is also adjacent to the stop, and provides storage and maintenance facilities for all the system's trams, having been expanded to cope with the additional trams ordered for phase two. The depot also contains NET's offices, staff facilities and control room.

The tram stop is located on reserved track alongside Wilkinson Street and has two side platforms flanking a pair of tracks. To the west, the tracks cross over the Robin Hood railway line on a bridge shared with Wilkinson Street, and then curve and descend to run parallel with the railway to Basford stop. To the east of the stop, there is a triangular junction that gives access to the depot, and the two tracks then cross each other and run separately in two different street alignments. Trams heading towards the city centre next call at Radford Road stop, whilst trams coming from the city centre do so via Shipstone Street stop.

With the opening of NET's phase two, Wilkinson Street is now on the common section of the NET, where line 1, between Hucknall and Chilwell, and line 2, between Phoenix Park and Clifton, operate together. Trams on each line run at frequencies that vary between 4 and 8 trams per hour, depending on the day and time of day, combining to provide up to 16 trams per hour on the common section.

== Gallery ==
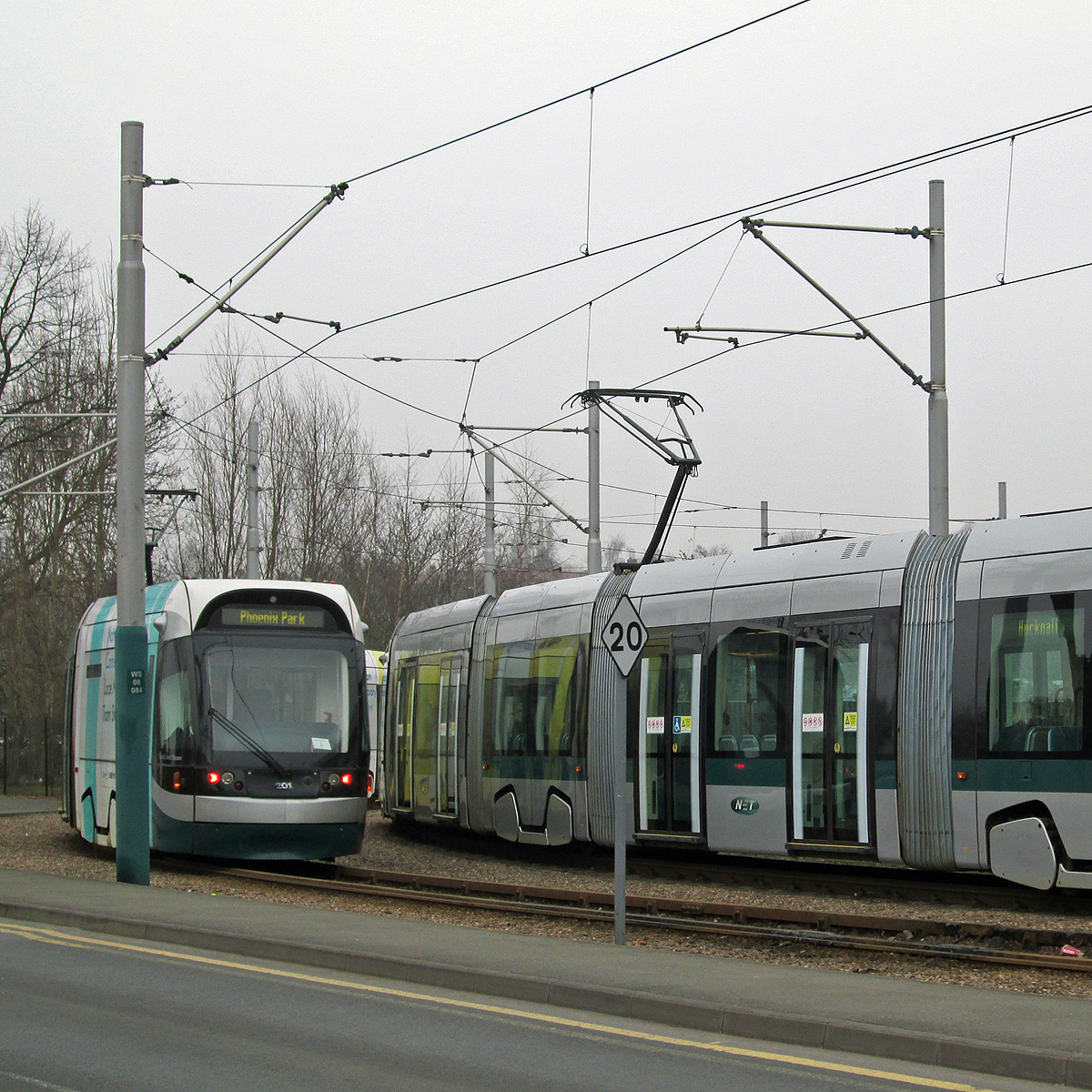
Trams switch between road- and rail-side alignments

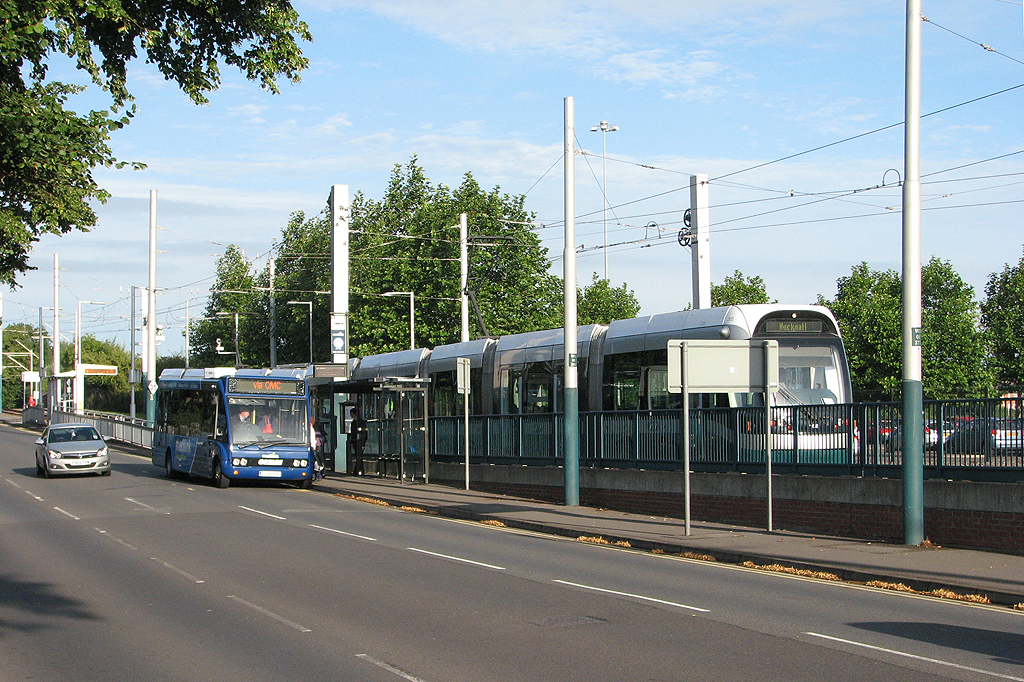
Bus interchange at the stop

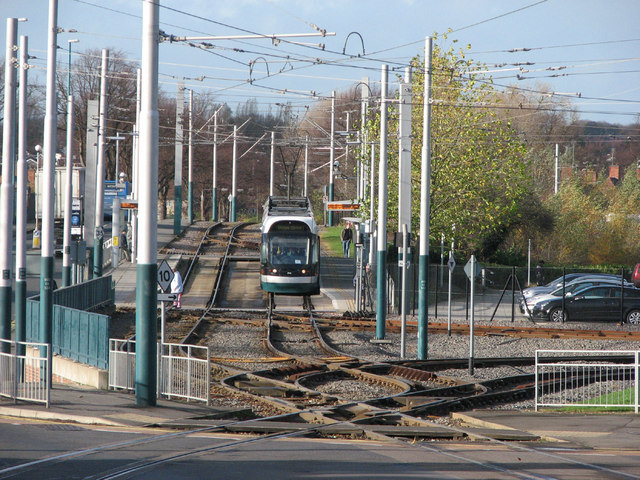
Complex trackwork to the east of the stop; depot access to right

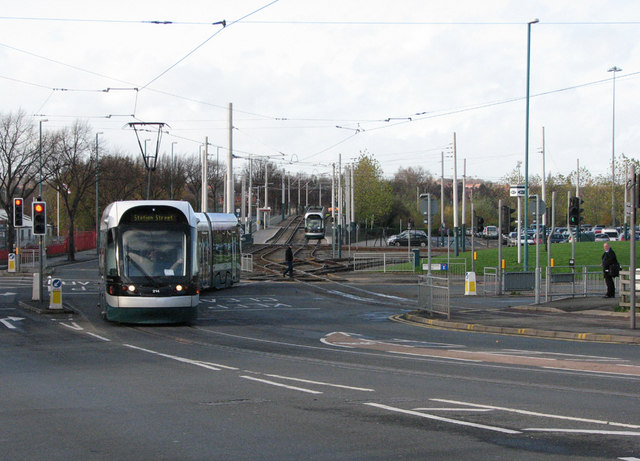
A city-bound tram has just left the stop and crossed the out-of-city track

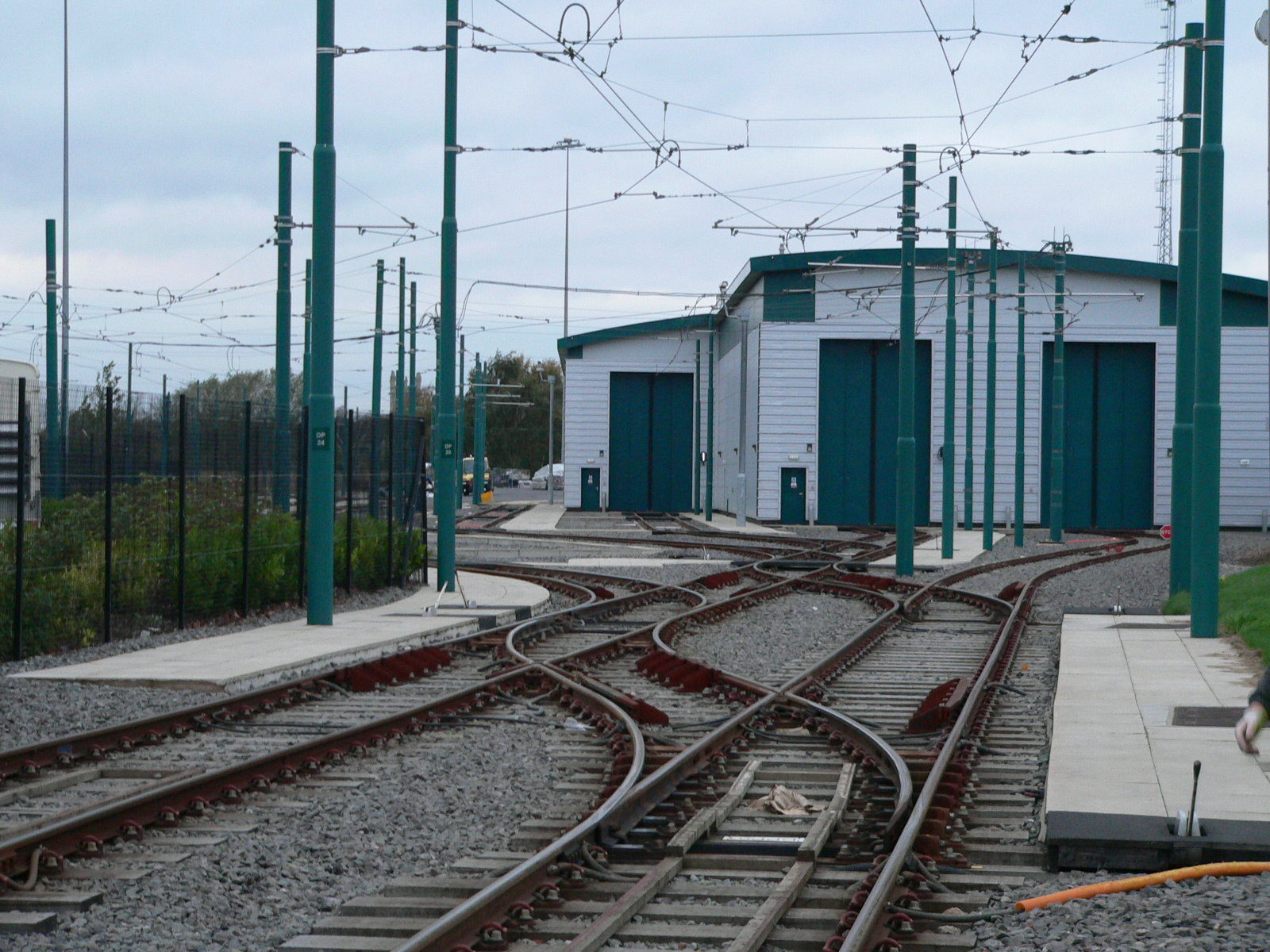
Indoor maintenance facilities at the depot

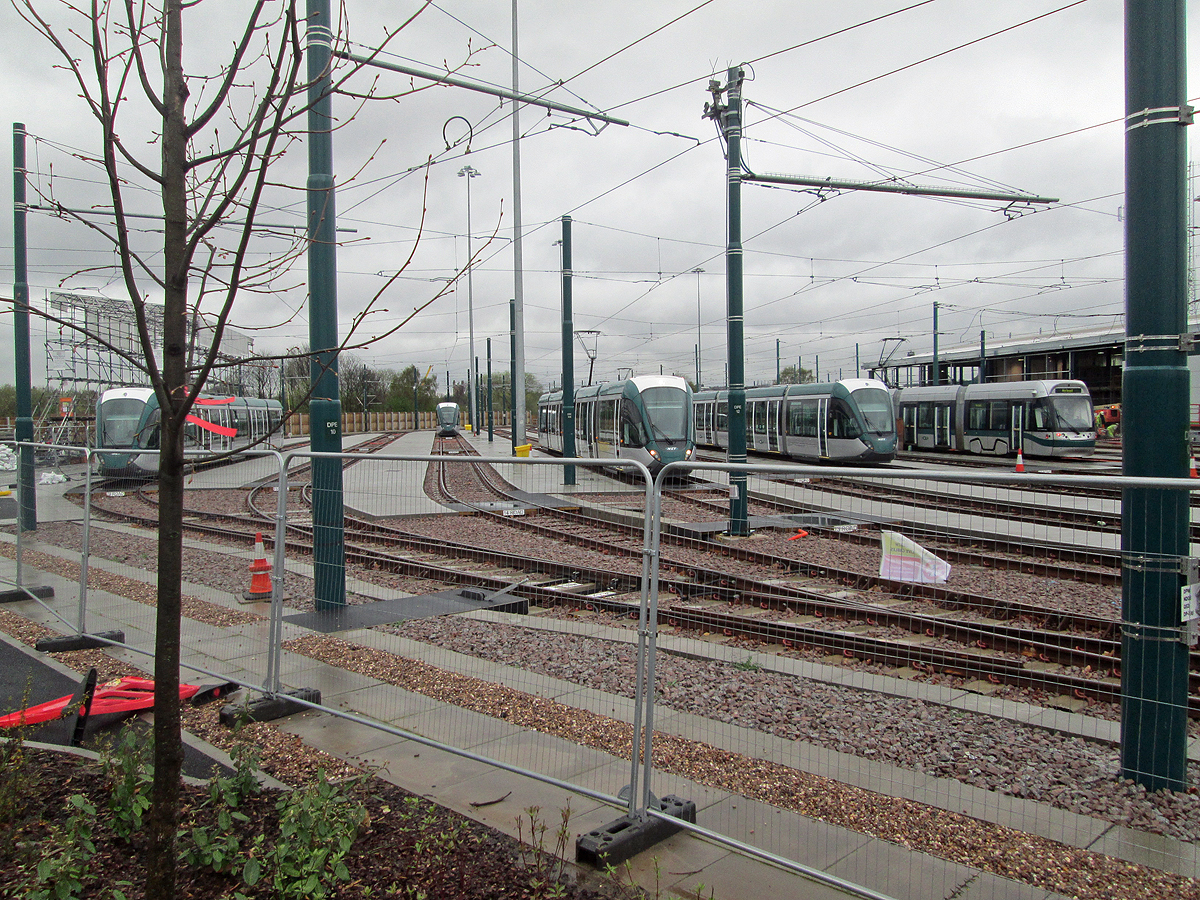
Storage sidings at the depot, as expanded for phase two
