= The Forest tram stop =

Tram stop in Nottingham, England

The Forest
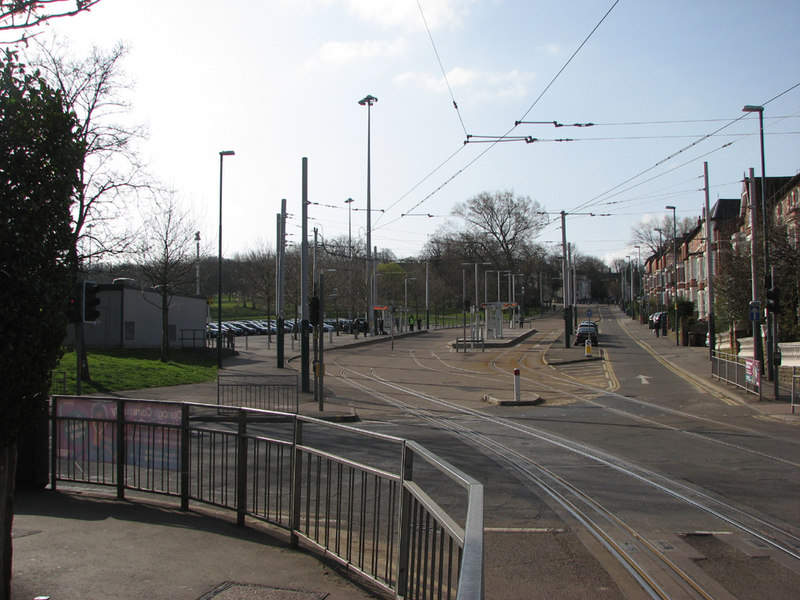

General information
- Location: Hyson Green, City of Nottingham; England
- Coordinates: 52°57′55″N 1°10′02″W
- System: Nottingham Express Transit tram stop
- Owner: Nottingham Express Transit
- Operator: Nottingham Express Transit
- Line: 1 2
- Platforms: 3
- Tracks: 3

Construction
- Structure type: At grade; on roadside reserved track
- Accessible: Step-free access to platform

Key dates
- 9 March 2004: Opened

Services
| Preceding station | NET | Following station |
|---|---|---|
| Noel Street towards Hucknall | Line 1 | High School towards Toton Lane |
| Noel Street towards Phoenix Park | Line 2 | High School towards Clifton South |
Location
- Location within Nottinghamshire

The Forest is a tram stop on Nottingham Express Transit (NET) in the city of Nottingham. It takes its name from the nearby Forest Recreation Ground, the site of the city's famous annual Goose Fair. The Forest serves as one of several park and ride stops on the NET network, with more than 950 car parking spaces located next to the stop.

The stop is situated on reserved track, between the street and recreation ground, and has three tracks. The western two tracks flank an island platform, whilst the easternmost track is served by its own side platform. In normal service, the westernmost track is used by northbound trams, and the easternmost by southbound trams towards the city. The centre track is connected to both running lines in both directions, and can be used to turn back short workings.

To the north of the stop, the two running tracks cross each other and run separately in two different street alignments, using Gauntlet track. Trams heading north next call at the Noel Street stop, whilst trams coming south do so via the Hyson Green Market stop.

The tram stop opened on 9 March 2004, along with the rest of NET's initial system.

With the opening of NET's phase two, The Forest is now on the common section of the NET, where line 1, between Hucknall and Chilwell, and line 2, between Phoenix Park and Clifton, operate together. Trams on each line run at frequencies that vary between 4 and 8 trams per hour, depending on the day and time of day, combining to provide up to 16 trams per hour on the common section.

== Gallery ==
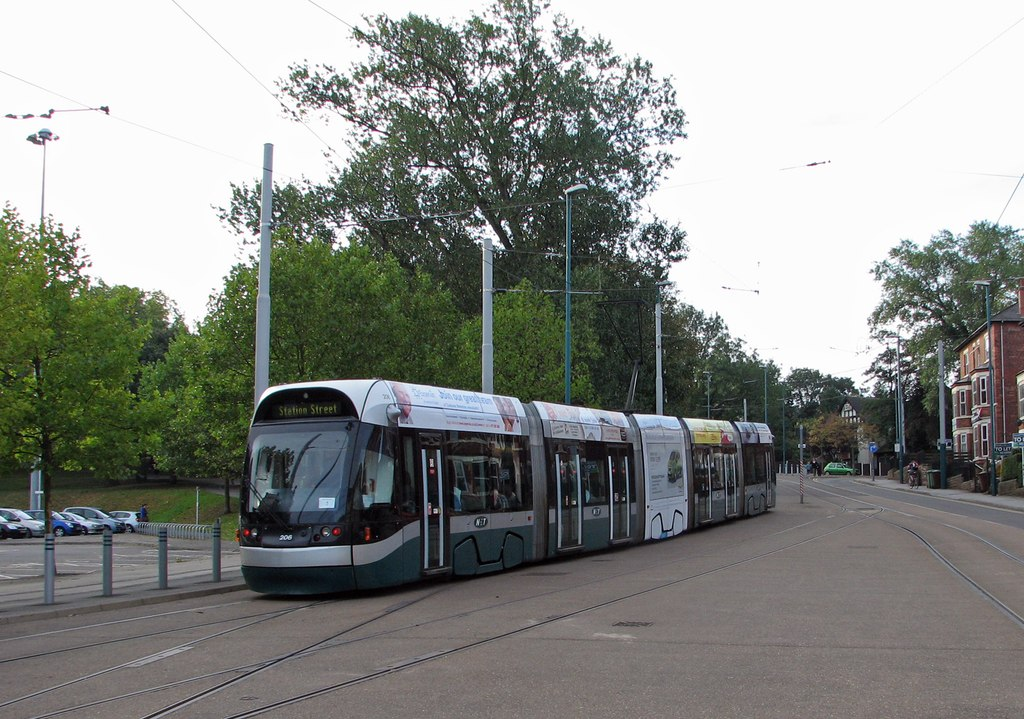
A south-bound tram departing for the city centre

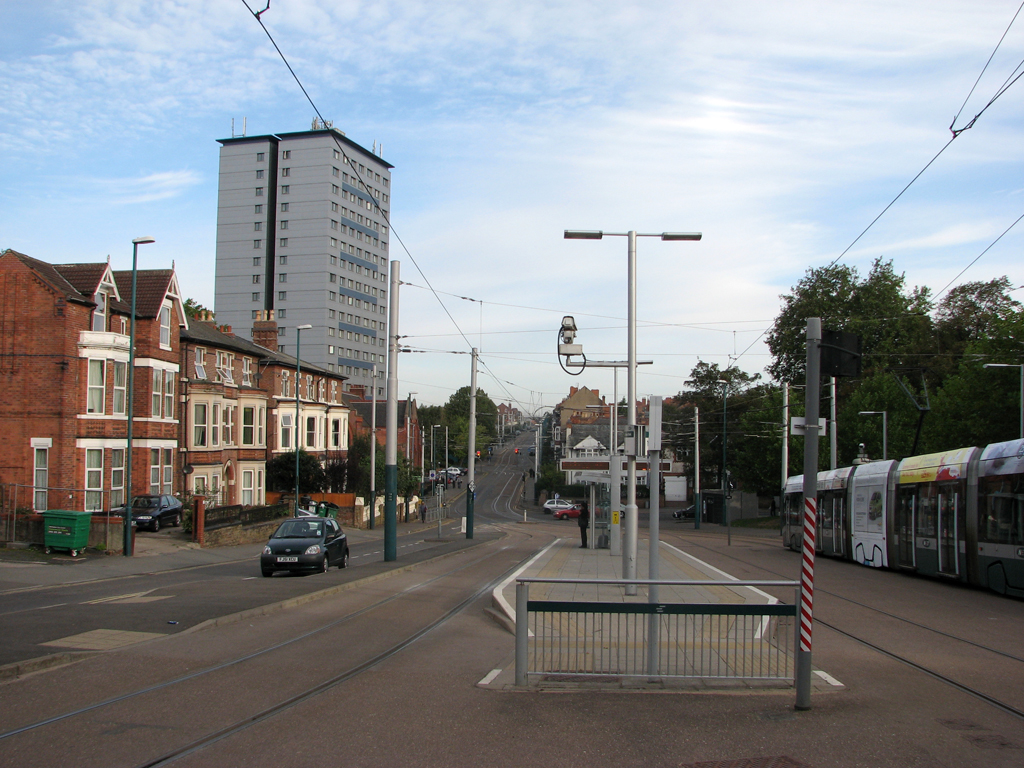
The tram stop looking north

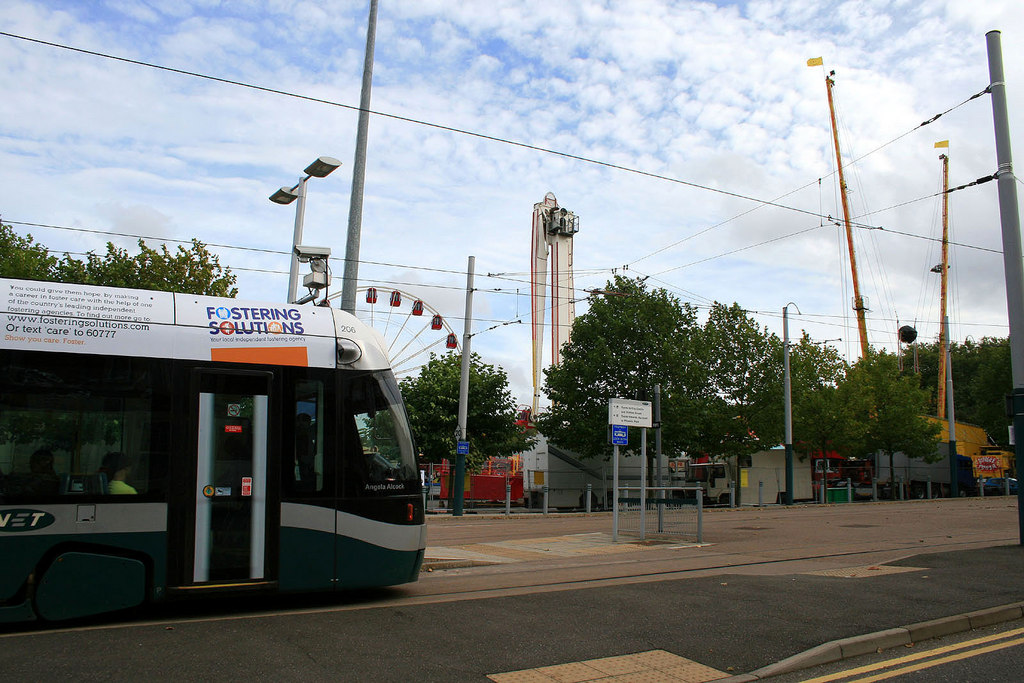
A tram at the stop during the Goose Fair

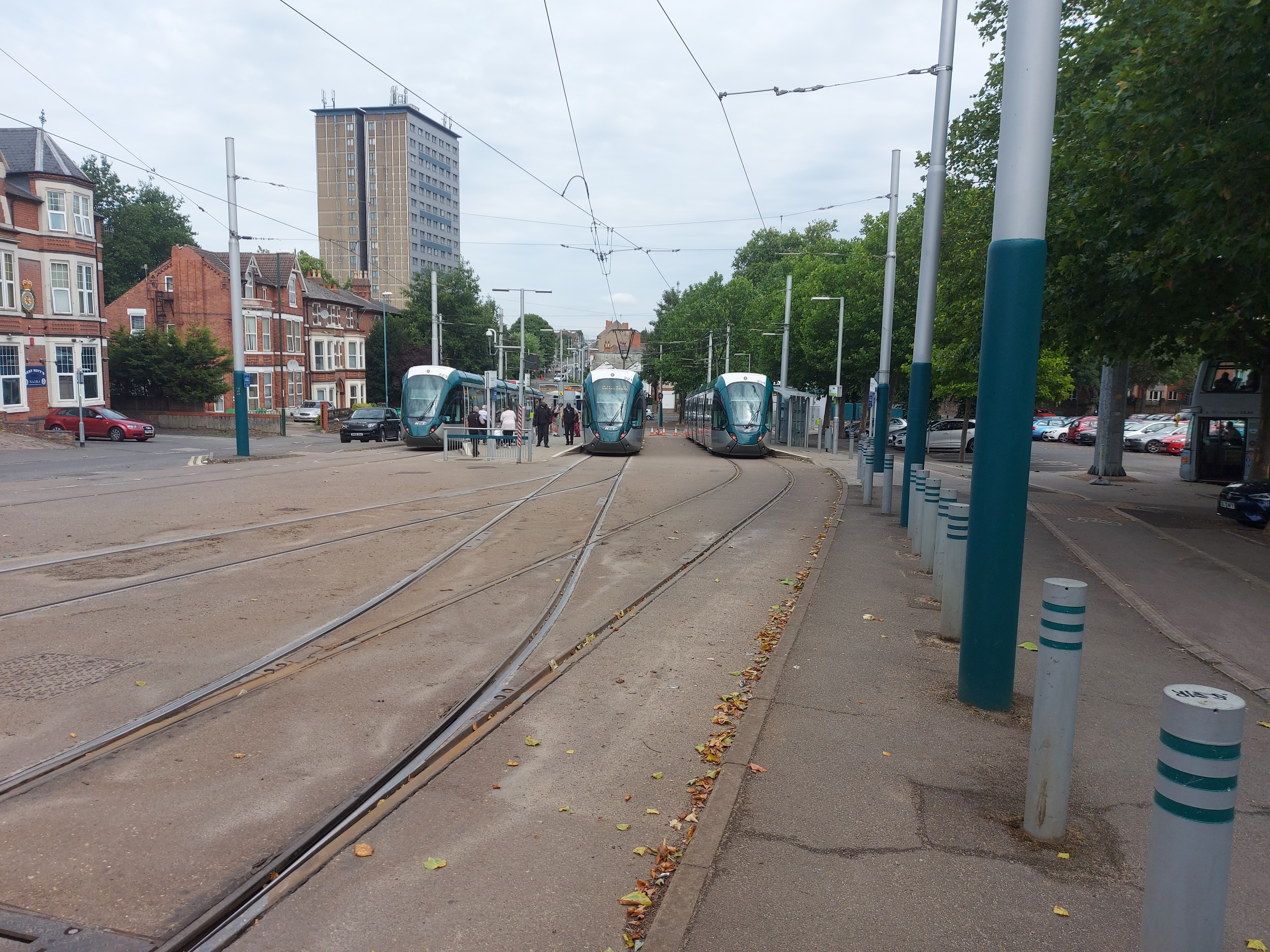
A service terminating at the middle platform at The Forest due to track maintenance at Hyson Green
