= High School tram stop =

Tram stop on the Nottingham Express Transit tram system in Nottingham, England

High School
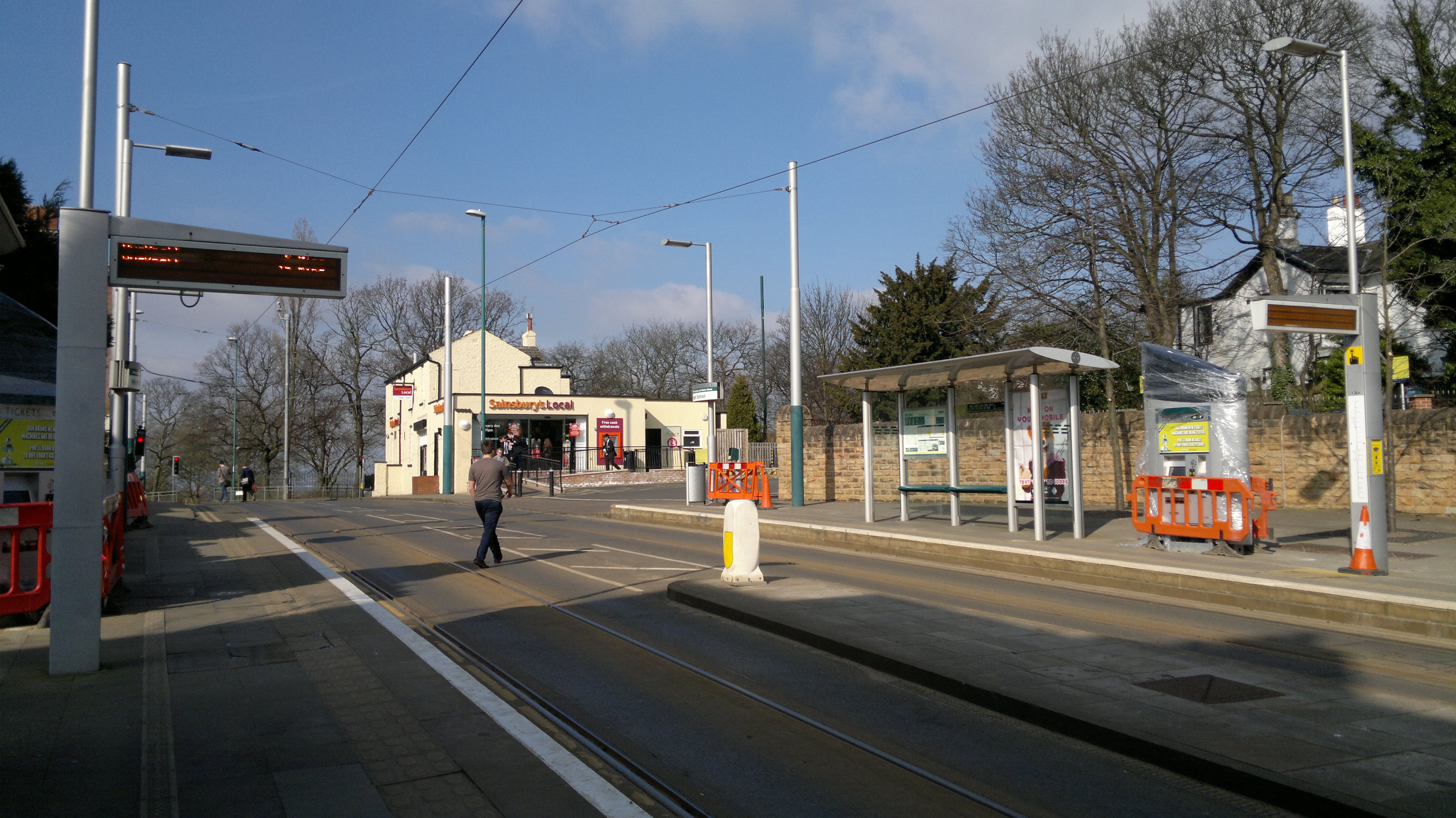

General information
- Location: The Arboretum, City of Nottingham; England
- Coordinates: 52°57′44″N 1°09′41″W
- System: Nottingham Express Transit tram stop
- Owner: Nottingham Express Transit
- Operator: Nottingham Express Transit
- Line: 1 2
- Platforms: 2
- Tracks: 2

Construction
- Structure type: At grade; in street
- Accessible: Step-free access to platform

Key dates
- 9 March 2004: Opened

Services
Preceding station	NET	Following station
The Forest towards Hucknall	Line 1	Nottingham Trent University towards Toton Lane
The Forest towards Phoenix Park	Line 2	Nottingham Trent University towards Clifton South
Location
- Location within Nottinghamshire

High School is a tram stop on Nottingham Express Transit (NET) in the city of Nottingham suburb of the Arboretum. It takes its name from the nearby Nottingham High School, and is situated in Waverley Street at its intersection with Gedling Grove, an intersection that has been closed to road vehicles by the construction of the stop. The tram tracks here share the road with other traffic, and the stop has two side platforms on either side of the twin tracks, which are themselves separated by a traffic island intended to prevent road vehicles overtaking stationary trams.

The tram stop opened on 9 March 2004, along with the rest of NET’s initial system.

With the opening of NET’s phase two, High School is now on the common section of the NET, where line 1, between Hucknall and Chilwell, and line 2, between Phoenix Park and Clifton, operate together. Trams on each line run at frequencies that vary between 4 and 8 trams per hour, depending on the day and time of day, combining to provide up to 16 trams per hour on the common section.

High School tram stop is near the top of a steep gradient, which climbs up from Nottingham Trent University tram stop to the south. To the north, the summit of the climb is by the former Vernon Arms, now a branch of Sainsbury's Local, before descending to The Forest tram stop.

== Gallery ==
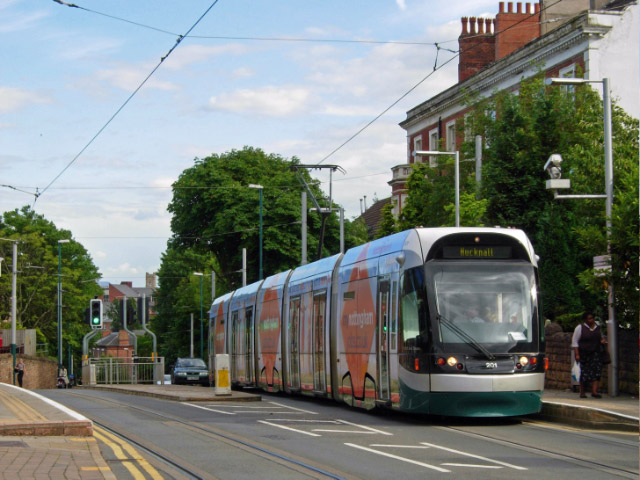
A northbound tram at the High School stop

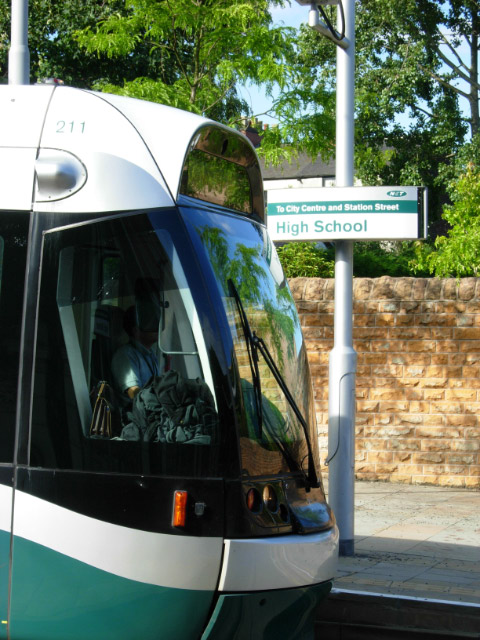
Stop sign

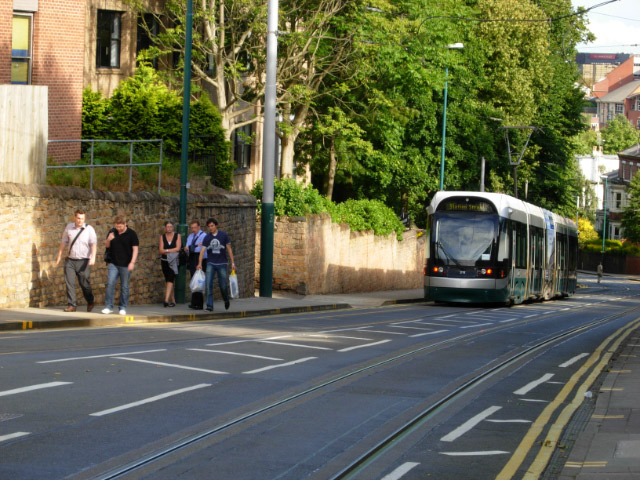
A southbound tram descends the steep gradient
