= Radford Road tram stop =

Nottingham Express Transit tram stop

Radford Road
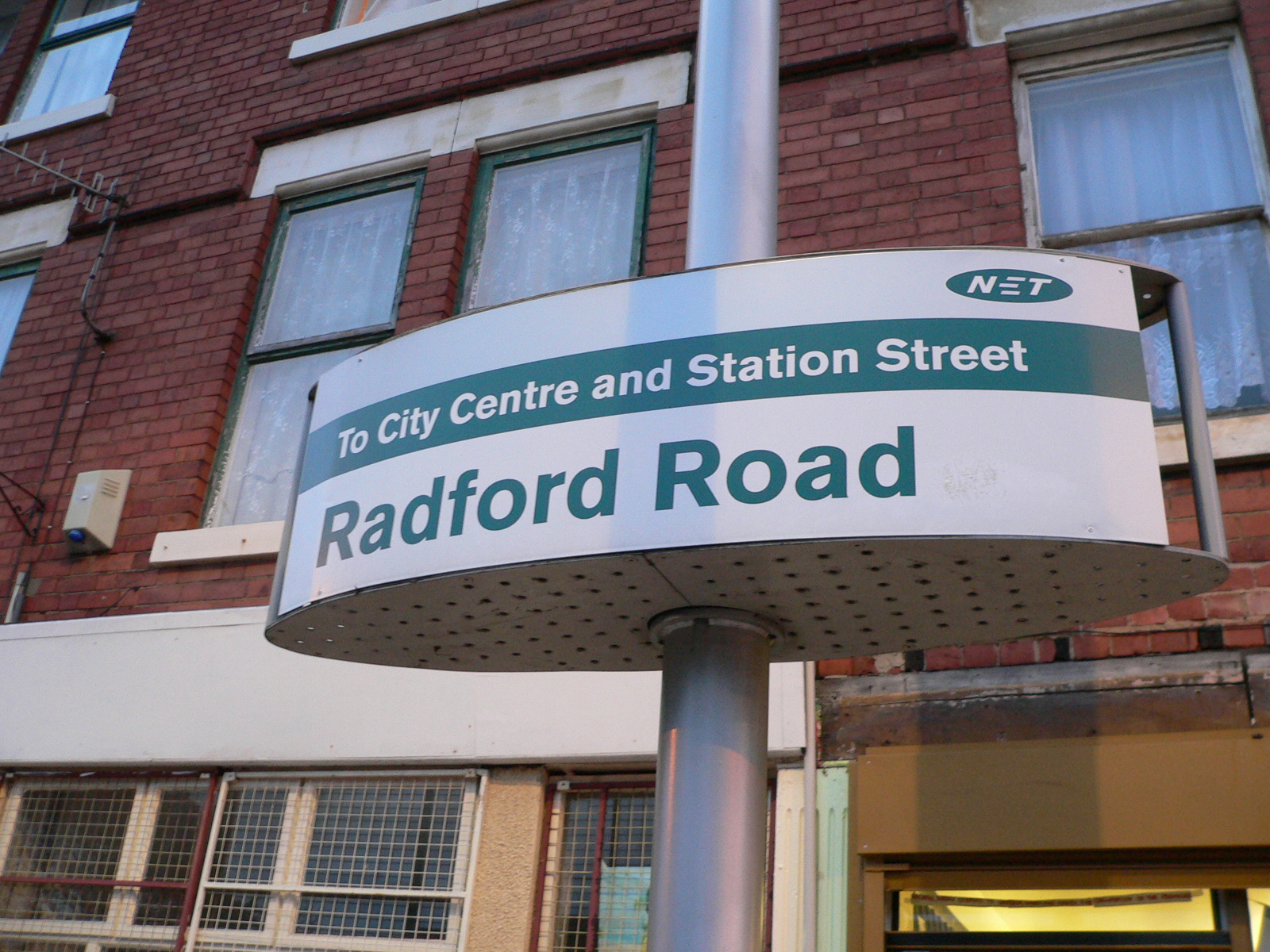

General information
- Location: Hyson Green, City of Nottingham; England
- Coordinates: 52°58′11″N 1°10′25″W
- System: Nottingham Express Transit tram stop
- Owner: Nottingham Express Transit
- Operator: Nottingham Express Transit
- Line: 1 2
- Platforms: 1
- Tracks: 1

Construction
- Structure type: At grade; on street track
- Accessible: Step-free access to platform

Key dates
- 9 March 2004: Opened

Services
Preceding station	NET	Following station
Shipstone Street (From Beaconsfield Street) towards Hucknall	Line 1	Hyson Green Market towards Toton Lane
Shipstone Street (From Beaconsfield Street) towards Phoenix Park	Line 2	Hyson Green Market towards Clifton South
Location
- Location within Nottinghamshire
Notes
- Services towards Hucknall and Phoenix Park depart from Beaconsfield Street ( 240m).

Radford Road is a tram stop on the Nottingham Express Transit network, serving the suburb of Hyson Green, City of Nottingham in Nottinghamshire, England.

== History ==
The stop opened on 9 March 2004, as part of the first phase of the network, between Hucknall or Phoenix Park and Station Street. It is located on a one-way section of the tramway, and is served only by southbound trams. The nearest northbound stop is Beaconsfield Street. It has one side platform flanking the single track, which is shared with other road traffic

On 25 August 2015, the network was extended south, with branches to Clifton South and Toton Lane.

== Services ==
As of January 2022, services operate at a combined 3–8 minute frequency between David Lane and Nottingham Station. Heading south, trams continue to Clifton South and Toton Lane up to every 7–15 minutes. Heading north (from nearby Beaconsfield Street), trams continue to Hucknall and Phoenix Park up to every 7–15 minutes.

Rolling stock used: Alstom Citadis and Bombardier Incentro
