= Moor Bridge tram stop =

Moor Bridge
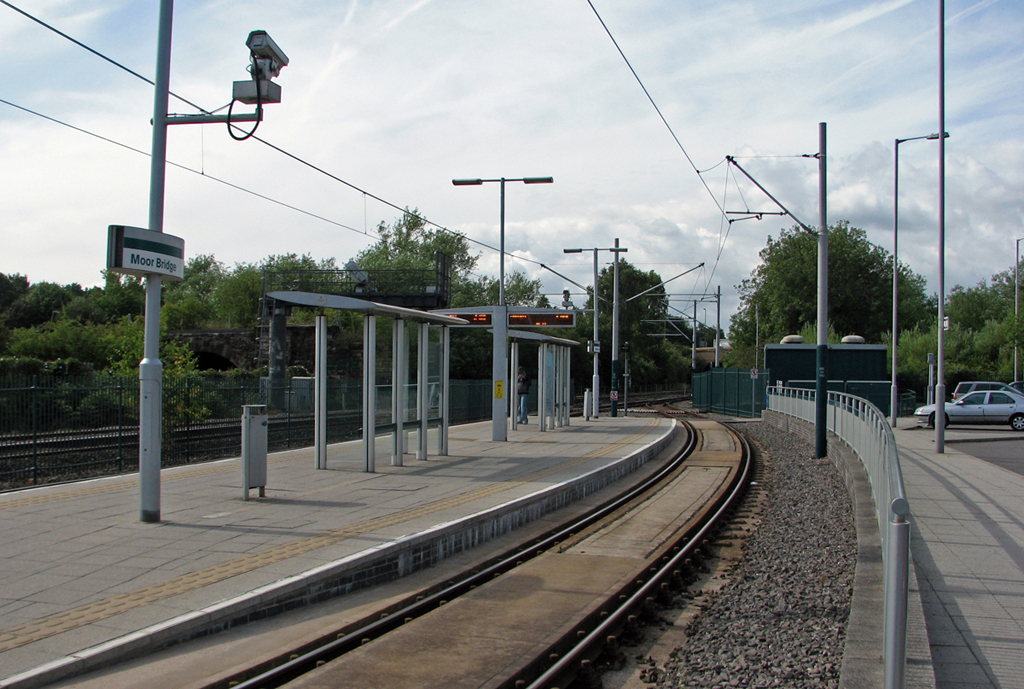

General information
- Location: Bulwell, City of Nottingham; England
- Coordinates: 53°00′52″N 1°11′13″W
- System: Nottingham Express Transit tram stop
- Owner: Nottingham Express Transit
- Operator: Nottingham Express Transit
- Line: 1
- Platforms: 1
- Tracks: 1

Construction
- Structure type: At grade; on private right of way
- Accessible: Step-free access to platform

Key dates
- 9 March 2004: Opened

Services
Preceding station	NET	Following station
Butler's Hill towards Hucknall	Line 1	Bulwell Forest towards Toton Lane
Location
- Location within Nottinghamshire

Moor Bridge is a tram stop on the Nottingham Express Transit (NET) light rail system in the city of Nottingham in the suburb of Bulwell. It is part of the NET's initial system, and is situated on the long single line section between Bulwell and Hucknall tram stops that runs alongside the Robin Hood railway line. Like all the other intermediate stops on this section, the stop has a passing loop with an island platform situated between the two tracks of the loop.

Moor Bridge serves as one of several park and ride stops on the NET network, with more than 100 car parking spaces located next to the stop. It is the most northerly stop within the city of Nottingham, with Butler's Hill, the next stop north, being in the district of Ashfield.

With the opening of NET's phase two, Moor Bridge is now on NET line 1, which runs from Hucknall through the city centre to Beeston and Chilwell. Trams run at frequencies that vary between 4 and 8 trams per hour, depending on the day and time of day.
