= Bulwell Forest tram stop =

Nottingham Express Transit tram stop

Bulwell Forest
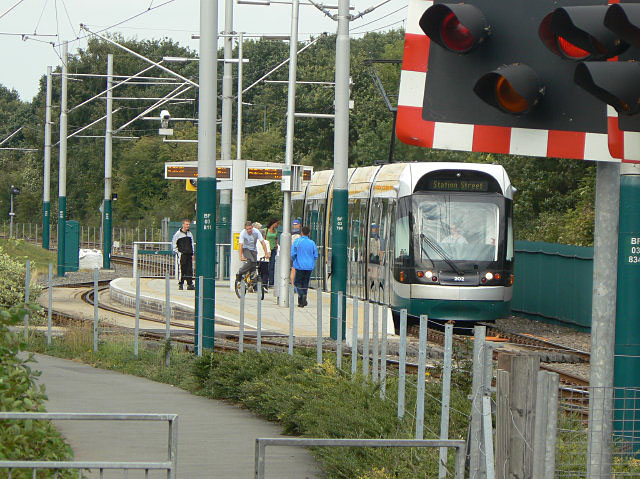

General information
- Location: Bulwell, City of Nottingham; England
- Coordinates: 53°00′21″N 1°11′25″W
- System: Nottingham Express Transit tram stop
- Owner: Nottingham Express Transit
- Operator: Nottingham Express Transit
- Line: 1
- Platforms: 1
- Tracks: 1

Construction
- Structure type: At grade; on private right of way
- Accessible: Step-free access to platform

Key dates
- 9 March 2004: Opened

Services
Preceding station	NET	Following station
Moor Bridge towards Hucknall	Line 1	Bulwell towards Toton Lane
Location
- Location within Nottinghamshire

Bulwell Forest is a tram stop on the Nottingham Express Transit (NET) light rail system in the city of Nottingham in the suburb of Bulwell. It is part of the NET's initial system, and is situated on the long single line section between Bulwell and Hucknall tram stops that runs alongside the Robin Hood railway line. Like all the other intermediate stops on this section, the stop has a passing loop with an island platform situated between the two tracks of the loop.

With the opening of NET's phase two, Bulwell Forest is now on NET line 1, which runs from Hucknall through the city centre to Beeston and Chilwell. Trams run at frequencies that vary between 4 and 8 trams per hour, depending on the day and time of day.

The tram stop should not be confused with the former Bulwell Forest railway station, which was situated on the, now closed, Great Northern Railway's Nottingham to Shirebrook line, some 750 metres (2,460 ft) to the south-east of the tram stop. The Robin Hood line that passes alongside the stop was originally the former Midland Railway route from Nottingham to Worksop, but there has never been a railway station at the stop's location.

There is a road level crossing just to the south of the tram stop, and pedestrian access to the stop is from this crossing. At the crossing, both tram and railway lines are protected by the automatic barriers. #
