= Linby railway station =

Former railway station in Nottinghamshire, England

Coordinates: 53.0518°N 1.2069°W

Linby railway station was a station on what is now the Robin Hood Line. It was used predominantly to serve Linby Colliery. It shut in 1964. When the line was re-opened in the 1990s it was decided not to re-open Linby station, or the nearby Annesley railway station.

Former Services

Preceding station	Disused railways	Following station
Hucknall	Midland Railway	Newstead
Newstead	LNER; Great Northern Railway	Hucknall Town
