= Hyson Green =

Area of Nottingham, England

Coordinates: 52.9664°N 1.1712°W

- Suburb
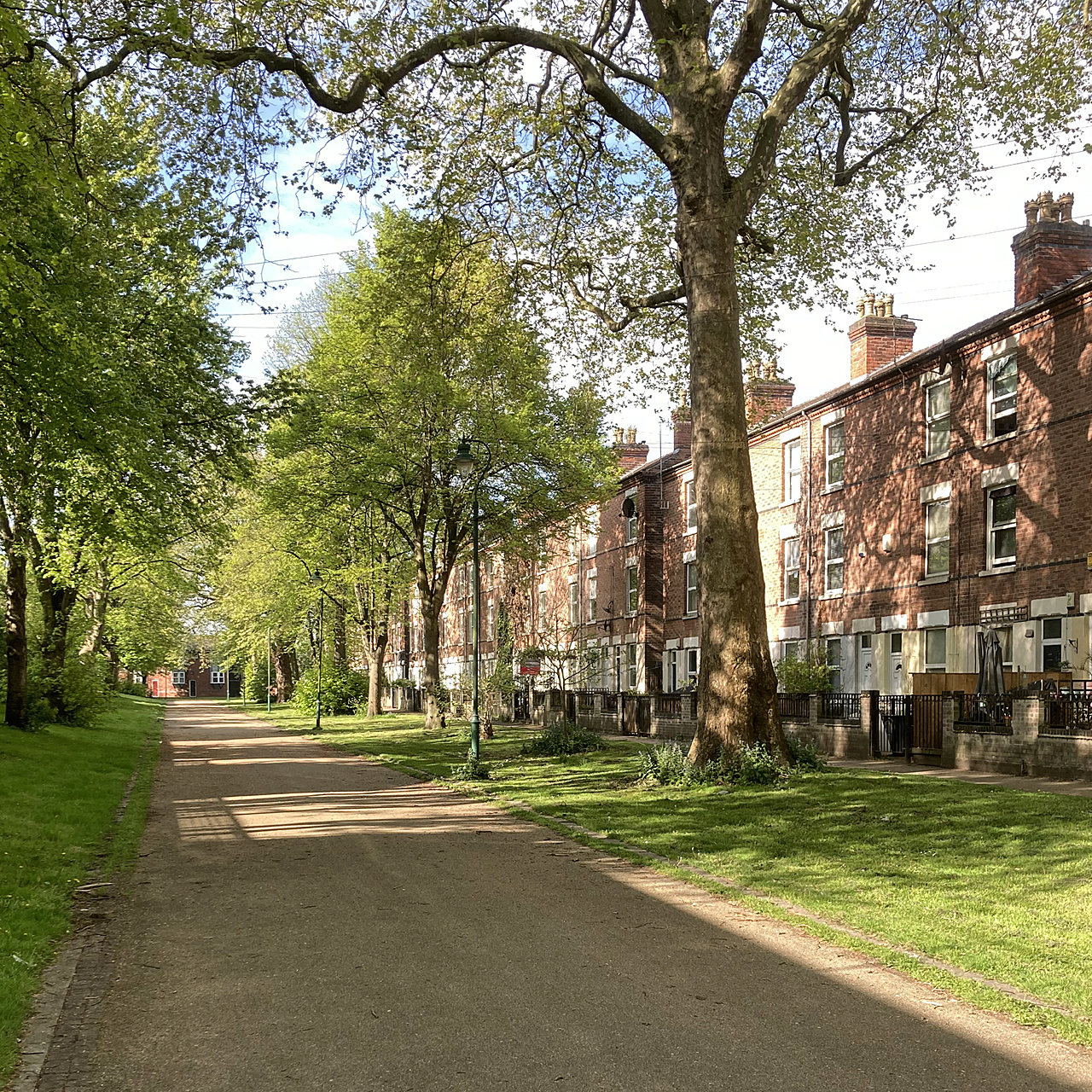
- Waterloo Promenade

- Location within Nottinghamshire
- Unitary authority: Nottingham
- Ceremonial county: Nottinghamshire
- Region: East Midlands
- Country: England
- Sovereign state: United Kingdom
- Post town: NOTTINGHAM
- Postcode district: NG7
- Dialling code: 0115
- Police: Nottinghamshire
- Fire: Nottinghamshire
- Ambulance: East Midlands
- UK Parliament: Nottingham East

Hyson Green is a neighbourhood and suburb in Nottingham, England. It is home to a variety of cultures with a thriving local economy. Hyson Green has the largest ethnic minority population in the city. Since 2006 Hyson Green has seen a larger rise in development and direct international investment than any other area of Nottingham.

Hyson Green is spread over Berridge and Arboretum wards of Nottingham. While the local economy is improving, child poverty remains higher than average, as listed in Nottingham City Council's ward profiles.

The area is served by Radford Road tram stop and Hyson Green Market tram stop on the Nottingham Express Transit. The opening of the tram system has boosted Hyson Green's profile and helped to regenerate the area.

== History ==
Hyson Green was built on the southern part of the Basford and Nottingham Lings, a large sandy waste of gorse bushes, ling, and heather with patches of grass. After the Norman Conquest it became part of the demesne of William Peverel, chief steward to William I in the Lordship of Lenton and Basford. William built Lenton Priory and removed any remaining trees. On the night of 19 October 1330, King Edward III walked along it with a posse of men to apprehend Roger Mortimer, in Nottingham Castle. He would have walked from Low Sands, or Radford through High Sands (now written as Hyson Green). Ecclesiastically, Hyson Green was within the Parish of Radford. The borough of Nottingham consisted of three parishes: St Mary, St Nicholas, and St Peter; building was restricted to within those tight geographical limits. As the definition was loosened, Hyson Green grew. After the enclosure act in 1798, the open forest at High Sands was cultivated. There were fields and gardens, and there is note of one ancient house and Bobbers corn mill.

=== First housing ===
The first modern house was built in 1802; in 1820, rows of houses were built in Pleasant Row, Lenton Street, Saville Row, Lindsay Street, and Pepper Street by societies of workmen: stocking-makers and warp hands. The houses cost £70 each, and workmen paid for them in instalments. The upper rooms were used as workshops where the residents installed rented stocking frames. These four-storey houses were spacious, with long individual front gardens. They marked a change from the confined courts and yards of New Radford, which were soon to follow. A tea garden and bowling green was made at the Cricket Players public-house, which was established by John Pepper about 1824.

The government of Nottingham was changed by the Municipal Corporations Act 1835. The Enclosure Act, 1844 freed Nottingham's open fields for building.

The streets were lit with gas in 1869. In 1875, Hyson Green comprised a few streets of houses mainly between the tram lines on Radford Road and the Hyson Green Works, a brass foundry, on Gregory Boulevard. There was open country between the settlement and Scotholme House in New Radford. The terraced frameknitters' houses had generous gardens. In addition to the brass foundry, there was a lace factory, an Anglican church with attached school, and two Methodist chapels. In Bedford Square and Radford Court (both demolished) were groups of back-to-back cottages. The Borough Extension Act 1877 brought Basford, Radford, and thus Hyson Green into Nottingham. A large number of houses were built by J. R. Morrison around 1880. Morrison died in 1886. In 1889 Nottingham became a county borough under the Local Government Act 1888. City status was awarded as part of the Diamond Jubilee celebrations of Queen Victoria, being signified in a letter from the prime minister, the Marquess of Salisbury to the mayor, dated 18 June 1897.

By 1912, Hyson Green was an area of gridiron streets with densely packed, small terraced houses. The generous gardens of the previous generation had been infilled with rows of small cottages. The area had become a classic slum, with high infant mortality and a strong self-supportive community.

=== On the flats ===
The Hyson Green Flats were built in 1965 and demolished in 1988. They were a well-known landmark in their day, and many people enjoyed living in the area due to its strong community spirit. There were 593 individual flats and maisonettes. They had a kitchen, separate bathroom and toilet, and communal underfloor central heating.

Councillor Marcia Watson reminisced:

High rise was popular then. People weren’t fussy back then. The view was beautiful. Absolutely beautiful. I loved it…for me, moving in and living there, it was the first home of my own.

Nottingham City Council had built these high-rise and deck-access developments using major contractors, notably George Wimpey and Taylor Woodrow, who built in off-the-peg schemes. The flats were accessed along 31 high-level walkways. There were defects in these estates, and legislative and economic changes disproportionately afflicted the communities living in council-rented accommodation. There was dissatisfaction with the council as landlord in this period and its repair schedules. By 1981, renting a council house was less than aspirational.

==== 1981 riots in Hyson Green ====
In 1981, there were serious riots across many major cities in England, including Nottingham, on the weekend of 10–12 July. The main motives for the riots were related to racial tension and inner-city deprivation, together with a distrust of the police and 'authority' in general. The riots started on the Friday night on Radford Road in response to a significant build-up of police presence, and moved to the flats in the early hours of Saturday morning. On the Saturday night the riots moved to the city centre when racists from outside the town had attacked blacks under the cover of the riots. The fighting began as a confrontation with the police using stones and petrol bombs, with shop windows only being broken 'accidentally', but looting occurred later; the rioters were always of mixed races and ages, employed and unemployed. Petrol bombs were made and thrown, but an early attempt to torch the flats was successfully resisted by the residents. Over 100 people were arrested by the police, but only one man was charged.

Prince Charles visited Hyson Green Flats in 1982, during a fact-finding tour of Britain's inner cities. 'He had minimum security as he visited the walkways and drank tea and talked with the residents. He left in a yellow helicopter', resident Mark Watson remembers.

=== Housing after the flats ===
The cleared area was used for an Asda superstore and low-rise, lower-density housing.

== Geography ==
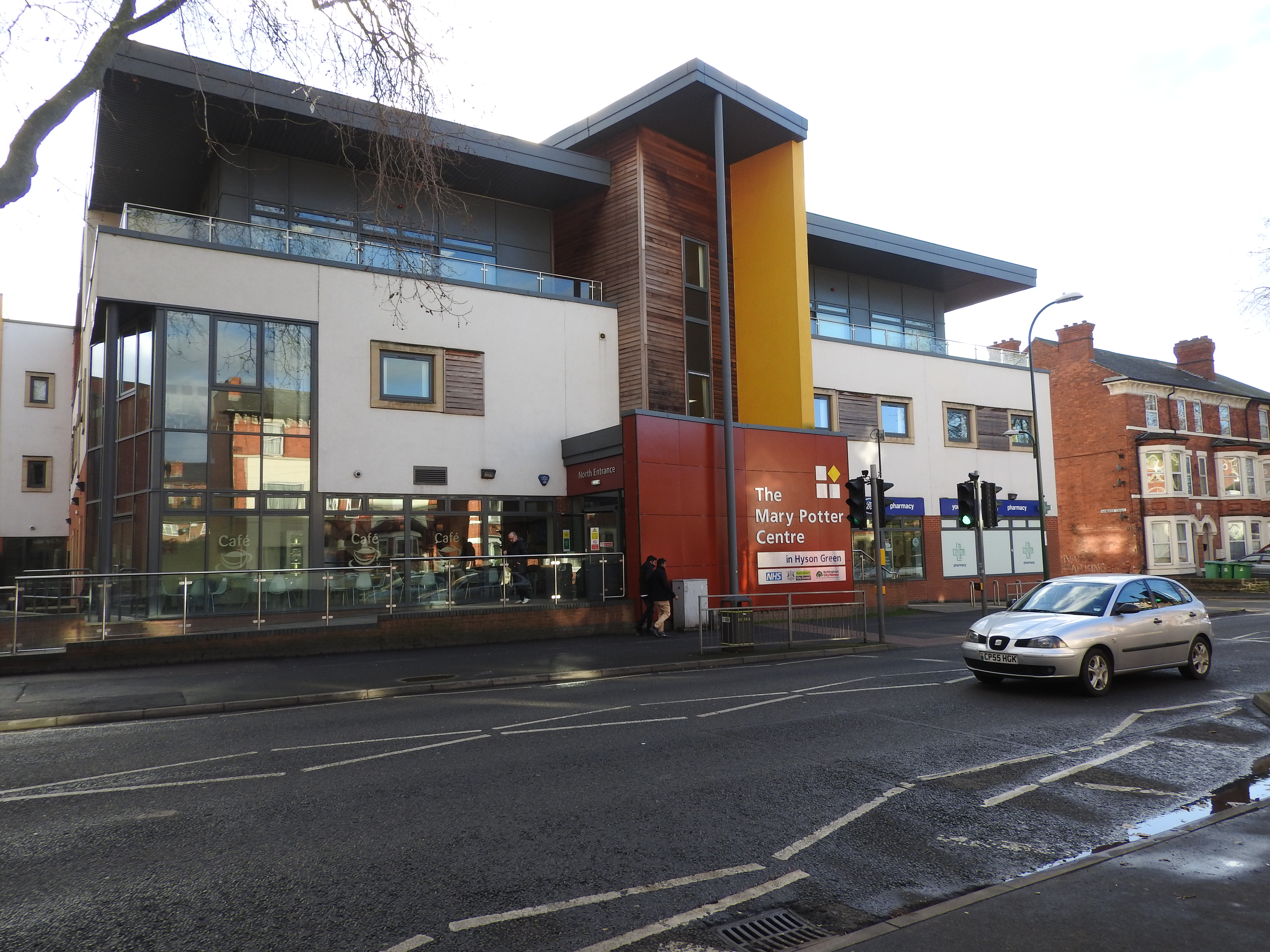
Mary Potter Centre

Adjacent to The Forest tram stop is the Forest Recreation Ground, which holds the annual Nottingham Goose Fair and frequent sport matches on the grass pitches. There is a small playground and several artificial grass pitches. The recreation ground was a race course in Victorian times. Local facilities include a library, now situated in the Mary Potter Centre which is named after Mary Potter, who founded the Little Company of Mary in Nottingham. The former library building dates from approximately 1890 and has always been a free library.

== Local economy and religion ==
Radford Road in Hyson Green is a shopping road outside the city centre. In 2013 it was home to two Asian supermarkets.

The local area has a Czech Republic Protestant Church, a Russian Orthodox Church, a Greek Orthodox Church, a Nigerian Catholic Church, 2 gurdwaras, 3 Hindu temples, a Buddhist temple, and 11 mosques.

- St Paul's Church, Hyson Green, now housing
- St Stephen's Church, Hyson Green
- Hyson Green Methodist Free Church, now a community centre
- St Mary's Roman Catholic Church

== Transport ==
Nottingham City Transport

- L12: University Campus – QMC – Hyson Green – City Hospital Island.
- L14: Nottingham – Canning Circus – Hyson Green – City Hospital – Basford – Bulwell.

Nottingham Express Transit

Preceding station	NET	Following station
Radford Road towards Toton Lane	Line 1	The Forest towards Hucknall
Radford Road towards Clifton South	Line 2	The Forest towards Phoenix Park

- Tram: Nottingham – Hyson Green – Basford – Bulwell – Hucknall.
- Tram: Nottingham – Hyson Green – Basford – Phoenix Park.

== Education ==
The closest secondary school is the Djanogly City Academy. On the edge of the district are Scotholme Primary and Nursery School, the neighbouring St. Marys Primary School and the two Berridge Primary and Nursery Schools, and, in New Radford, St Mary's RC Primary School.

== Famous people ==
- Tom Blower (1914–1955), swimmer born in Hyson Green
- Peter Bowles (1936–2022), actor
- Fred Geary (1868–1955), the Everton and England footballer was born in Hyson Green. He started his career with Notts County.
- Ice MC (1965-), Eurodance rapper
