= Butler's Hill tram stop =

Butler's Hill
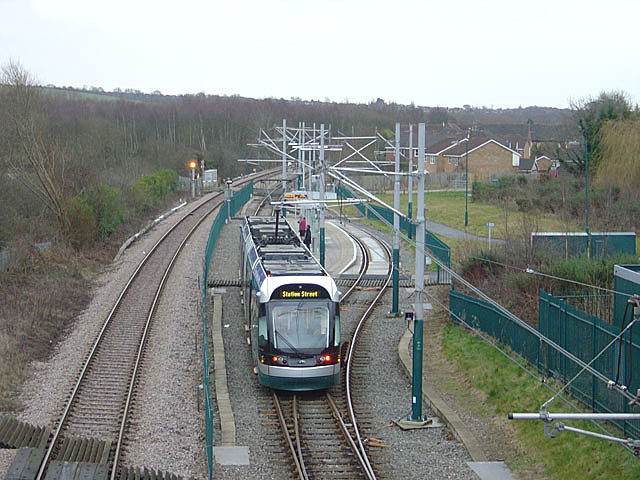

General information
- Location: Butler's Hill, Hucknall, Ashfield; England
- Coordinates: 53°01′44″N 1°11′19″W
- System: Nottingham Express Transit tram stop
- Owner: Nottingham Express Transit
- Operator: Nottingham Express Transit
- Line: 1
- Platforms: 2
- Tracks: 2

Construction
- Structure type: At grade; on private right of way
- Accessible: Step-free access to platform

Key dates
- 9 March 2004: Opened

Services
Preceding station	NET	Following station
Hucknall Terminus	Line 1	Moor Bridge towards Toton Lane
Location
- Location within Nottinghamshire

Butler's Hill is a tram stop on the Nottingham Express Transit network, serving the suburb of Butler's Hill, Ashfield in Nottinghamshire, England.

The station is situated on the long single line section between Bulwell and Hucknall, which runs alongside the Robin Hood Line. Like all the other intermediate stops on this section, the stop has a passing loop with an island platform situated between the two tracks of the loop.

With the opening of NET's phase two, Butler's Hill is now on NET line 1, which runs from Hucknall through the city centre to Beeston and Chilwell. Trams run at frequencies that vary between four and eight trams per hour, depending on the day and time of day.

The tram stop should not be confused with the former Butler's Hill railway station, which was situated on the, now closed, Great Northern Railway's Nottingham to Shirebrook line, some 250 metres (820 ft) to the north-west of the tram stop. The Robin Hood line that passes alongside the stop was originally the former Midland Railway route from Nottingham to Worksop, but there has never been a railway station at the stop's location.
