= Bulwell Forest =

Bulwell Forest may refer to:

- Bulwell Forest railway station, a former station on the Great Northern Railway in Nottingham, England
- Bulwell Forest tram stop, a stop on the Nottingham Express Transit system in Nottingham, England
- Bulwell Forest ward, a local authority ward in the city of Nottingham, England
