= Newstead railway station =

Railway station in Newstead, Nottinghamshire, England

Newstead
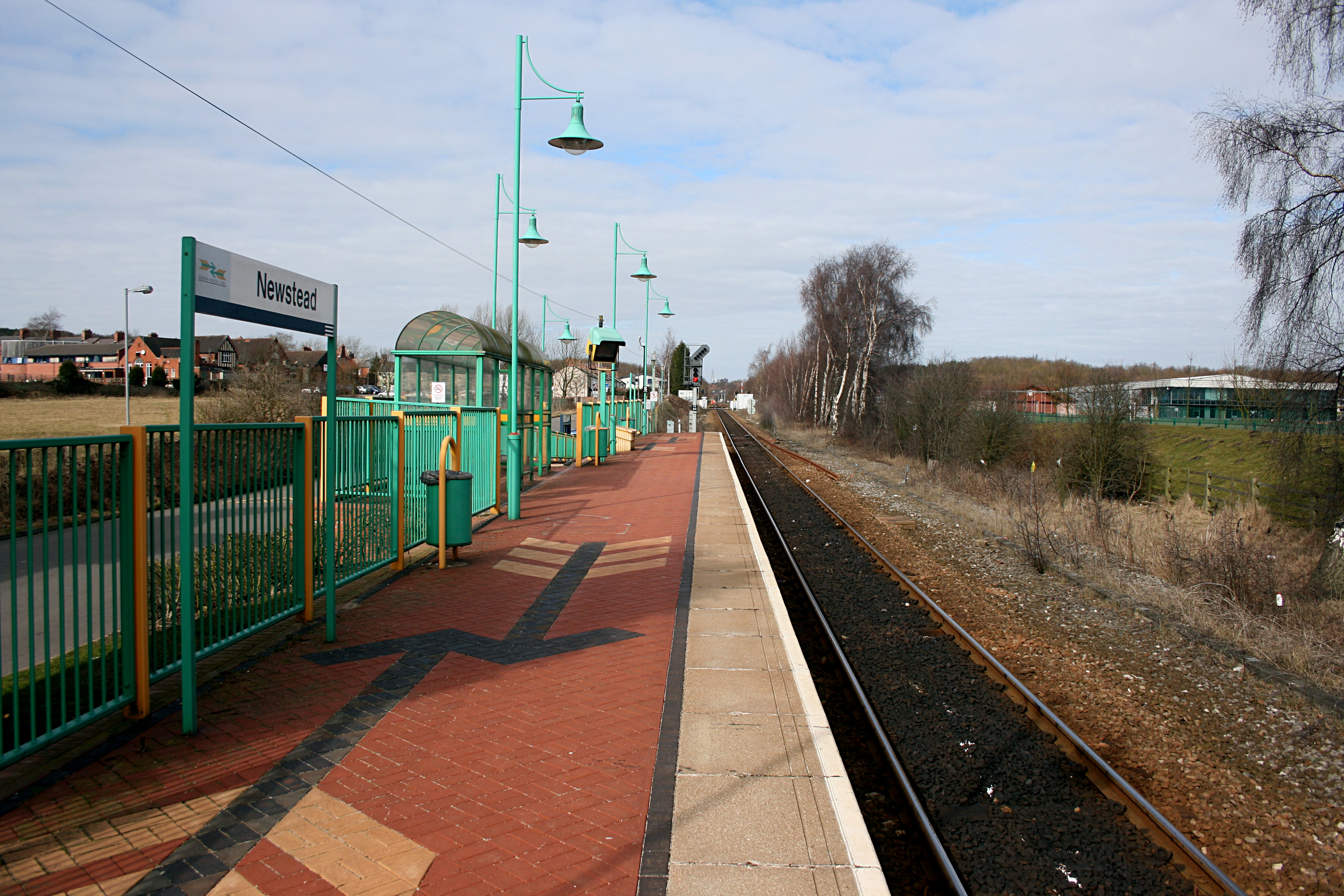

General information
- Location: Newstead, Gedling; England
- Coordinates: 53.0700°N 1.2219°W
- Grid reference: SK522528
- Manager: East Midlands Railway
- Platforms: 1

Other information
- Station code: NSD
- Classification: DfT category F1

Key dates
- 1 July 1883: Opened
- 12 October 1964: Closed
- 17 May 1993: Re-opened

Passengers
- 2021/22: ▲23,010
- 2022/23: ▲31,702
- 2023/24: ▲33,046
- 2024/25: ▼32,816
- 2025/26: ▲36,364
Location
Notes
- Passenger statistics from the Office of Rail and Road

Newstead railway station serves the village of Newstead, Nottinghamshire, England. Newstead was the original terminus of the Robin Hood Line when it was re-opened in 1993 by British Rail, under the Regional Railways sector. The line has since been extended to Mansfield and Worksop. Annesley, just to the north of Newstead, did not re-open.

Newstead Abbey, the ancestral home of Lord Byron is about two to three miles away and is served by this station.

== Original station ==
The first station was opened by the Midland Railway on 1 July 1883 and was closed by British Rail on 12 October 1964.

== Services ==
All services at Newstead are operated by East Midlands Railway. During the weekday off-peak and on Saturdays, the station is generally served by an hourly service northbound to Worksop and southbound to Nottingham. During the peak hours, the station is also served by an additional two trains per day between Nottingham and Mansfield Woodhouse. On Sundays, the station is served by a two-hourly service between Nottingham and Mansfield Woodhouse, with no service to Worksop. Sunday services to Worksop are due to recommence at the station during the life of the East Midlands Railway franchise.

Preceding station	National Rail	Following station
Hucknall	East Midlands Railway Robin Hood Line	Kirkby-in-Ashfield
	Disused railways	
Annesley	London and North Eastern Railway Great Northern Railway	Linby
