= Tom Blower =

British swimmer

Personal information
- Born: 1914 Hyson Green, Nottingham, England, UK
- Died: 1955 (aged 40–41) Nottingham, England, UK

Sport
- Sport: Swimming

Tom Blower (1914–1955; nicknamed "Torpedo") was a British man who on 27–28 July 1947 became the first to successfully swim the North Channel between Ireland and Scotland, completing the feat in 15 hours and 26 minutes. In spite of multiple attempts by others, the North Channel would not be successfully crossed by a swimmer again until 12 September 1970, when it was accomplished by Kevin Murphy. Blower also swam the English Channel several times, with a personal best speed of 13 hours and 29 minutes in 1937 that set a new record, shaving the previous best by 23 minutes.

Born in Hyson Green in 1914, Blower was a resident of Nottingham until shortly before his death of a heart attack in 1955, when he resided in Dartmouth. A long-distance endurance swimmer, Blower practiced in the River Trent near The Meadows. The son of a miner, Blower was a decorated World War II hero who gained celebrity status for his swimming prowess.
