= Annesley railway station =

Former railway station in Nottinghamshire, England

Coordinates: 53°4′38.5″N 1°13′39.3″W

Annesley

General information
- Location: Annesley, Ashfield; England
- Platforms: 2

Other information
- Status: Disused

History
- Original company: Midland Railway
- Pre-grouping: Midland Railway
- Post-grouping: London Midland and Scottish Railway

Key dates
- 1 July 1874: Opened
- 6 April 1953: Closed
Location

Annesley railway station was a station in Annesley, Nottinghamshire, England. It was opened in 1874 to serve the mining village of Annesley, which had grown following the opening of Annesley colliery in 1865. It was closed in 1953 and the line closed to passengers in 1964. The station did not reopen as part of the Robin Hood Line project in the 1990s.

== History ==
Opened by the Midland Railway, it became part of the London, Midland and Scottish Railway during the Grouping of 1923. The station then passed on to the London Midland Region of British Railways on nationalisation in 1948, which closed it five years later.

=== Stationmasters ===
- R. Grice 1874 - 1878
- Henry Harding 1878 - 1888
- Henry Robinson 1889 - 1919
- W.C. Stephenson 1935 - 1942 (formerly station master at Asfordby, afterwards station master at Codnor Park and Ironville)
- F.J. Toghill 1942
- B.V.Wall 1953 (Subsequently, Swanwick Junction Station, then 1959 Station Master, Salima, Nyasaland (now Malawi) and then 1964 Victorian Railways, Melbourne, Australia)

== The site today ==
Trains operating on the Robin Hood Line still pass the site. Although the line re-opened in stages during the 1990s, Annesley station did not reopen due to its proximity to Newstead.

Former Services

Preceding station	Disused railways	Following station
Newstead	Midland Railway	Kirkby-in-Ashfield (East)
Newstead	Mansfield Railway	Kirkby-in-Ashfield Central
