= Phoenix Park tram stop =

Nottingham Express Transit tram stop in Nottingham, England

Phoenix Park
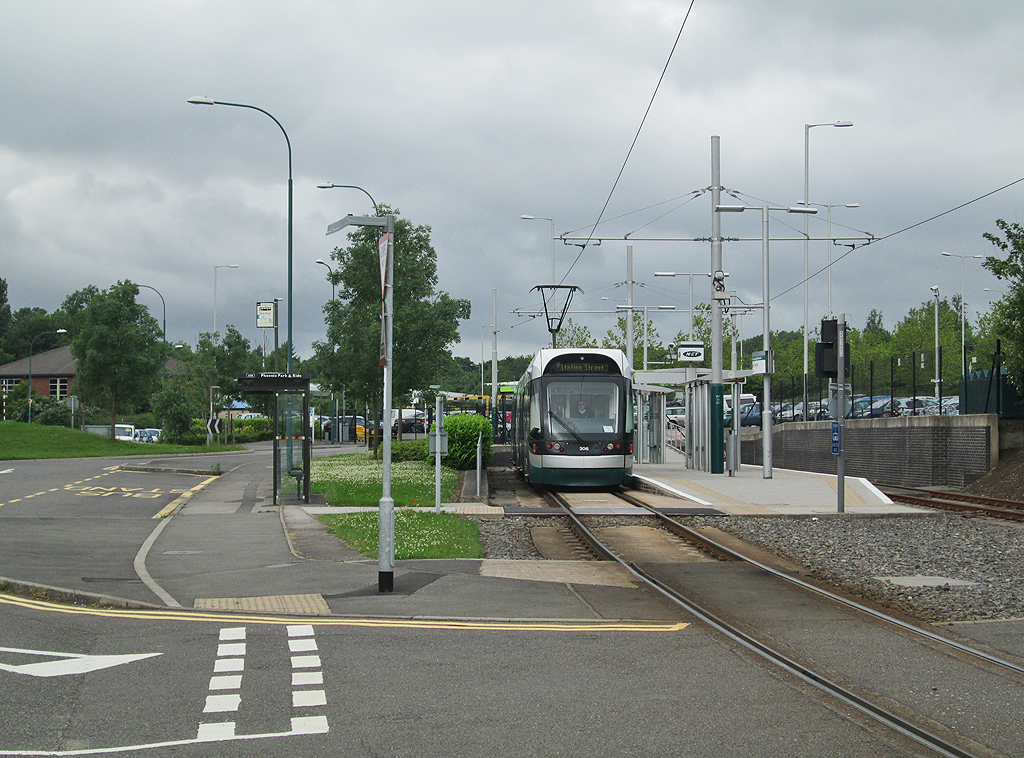

General information
- Location: Cinderhill, City of Nottingham; England
- Coordinates: 52°59′20″N 1°12′24″W
- System: Nottingham Express Transit tram stop
- Owner: Nottingham Express Transit
- Operator: Nottingham Express Transit
- Line: 2
- Platforms: 2
- Tracks: 2

Construction
- Structure type: At grade; on roadside reserved track
- Accessible: Step-free access to platform

Key dates
- 9 March 2004: Opened

Services
Preceding station	NET	Following station
Terminus	Line 2	Cinderhill towards Clifton South
Location
- Location within Nottinghamshire

Phoenix Park is a tram stop on the Nottingham Express Transit (NET) light rail system, in the city of Nottingham suburb of Bulwell. It serves as one of the two northern termini (the other being Hucknall) of the NET's initial system, and is at the end of the short single line branch from Highbury Vale. The stop has a single island platform, flanked by two stub tracks which are segregated from the adjacent road. Phoenix Park serves as one of several park and ride stops on the NET network, with more than 600 car parking spaces located next to the stop.

With the opening of NET's phase two, Phoenix Park is now the terminus of NET line 2, which runs through the city centre to a terminus in Clifton. Trams run at frequencies that vary between 4 and 8 trams per hour, depending on the day and time of day.

The tram stop and car park, along with the surrounding business park, is on the site of the former Babbington Colliery, also known as Cinderhill Colliery, which opened in 1841 and was the first site for large-scale coal mining in the county of Nottinghamshire.

== Gallery ==
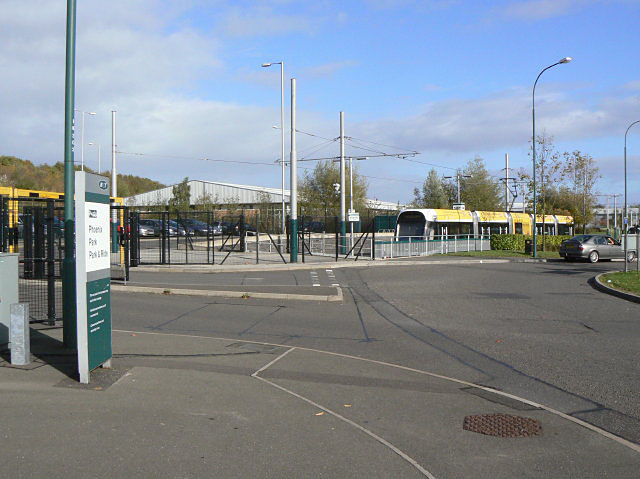
Street entrance

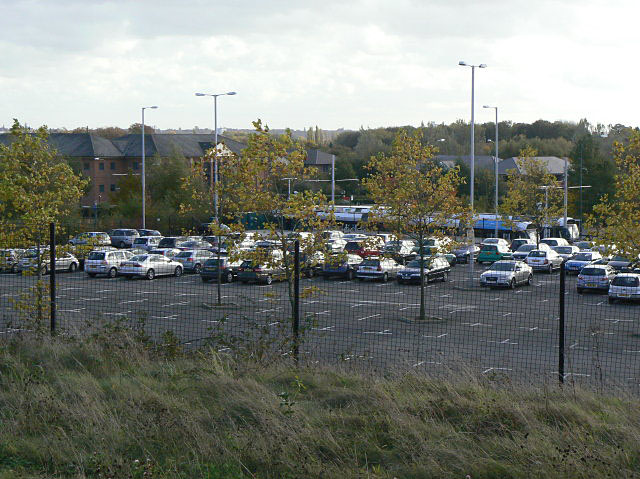
Park and ride

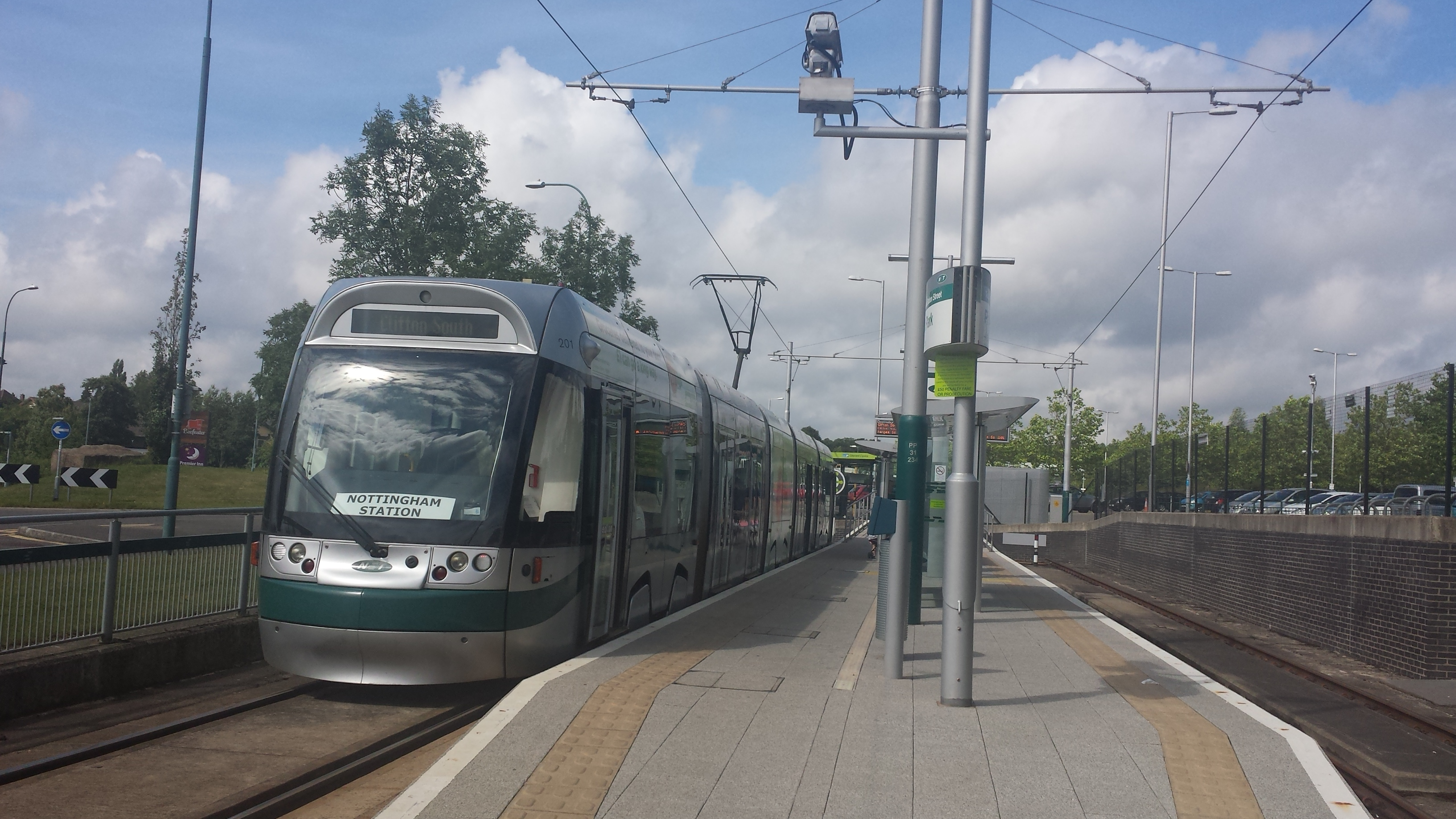
The platform

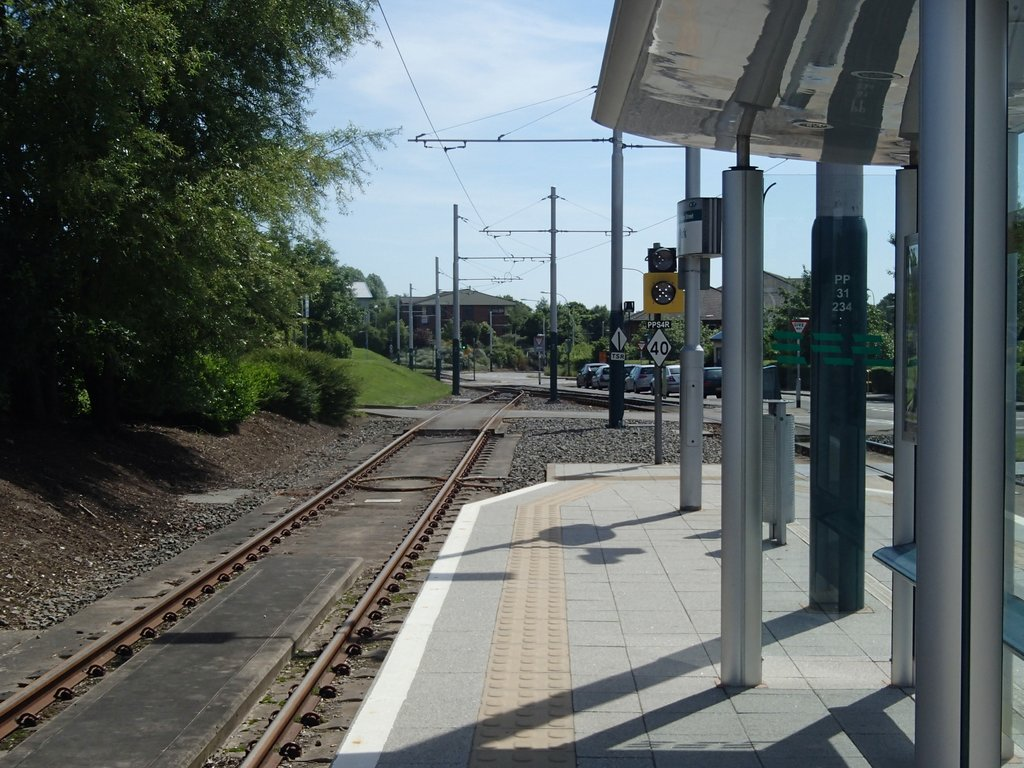
Tracks quickly become one

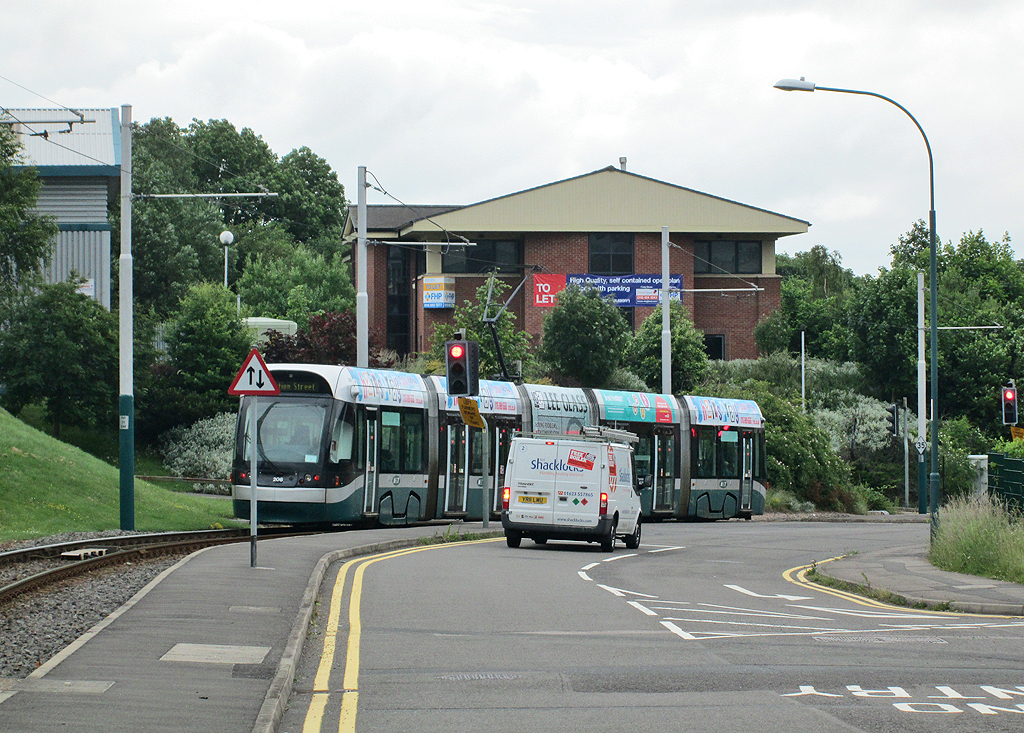
On the way to Cinderhill
