= Clifton South tram stop =

Tram stop in Nottinghamshire, England

Clifton South
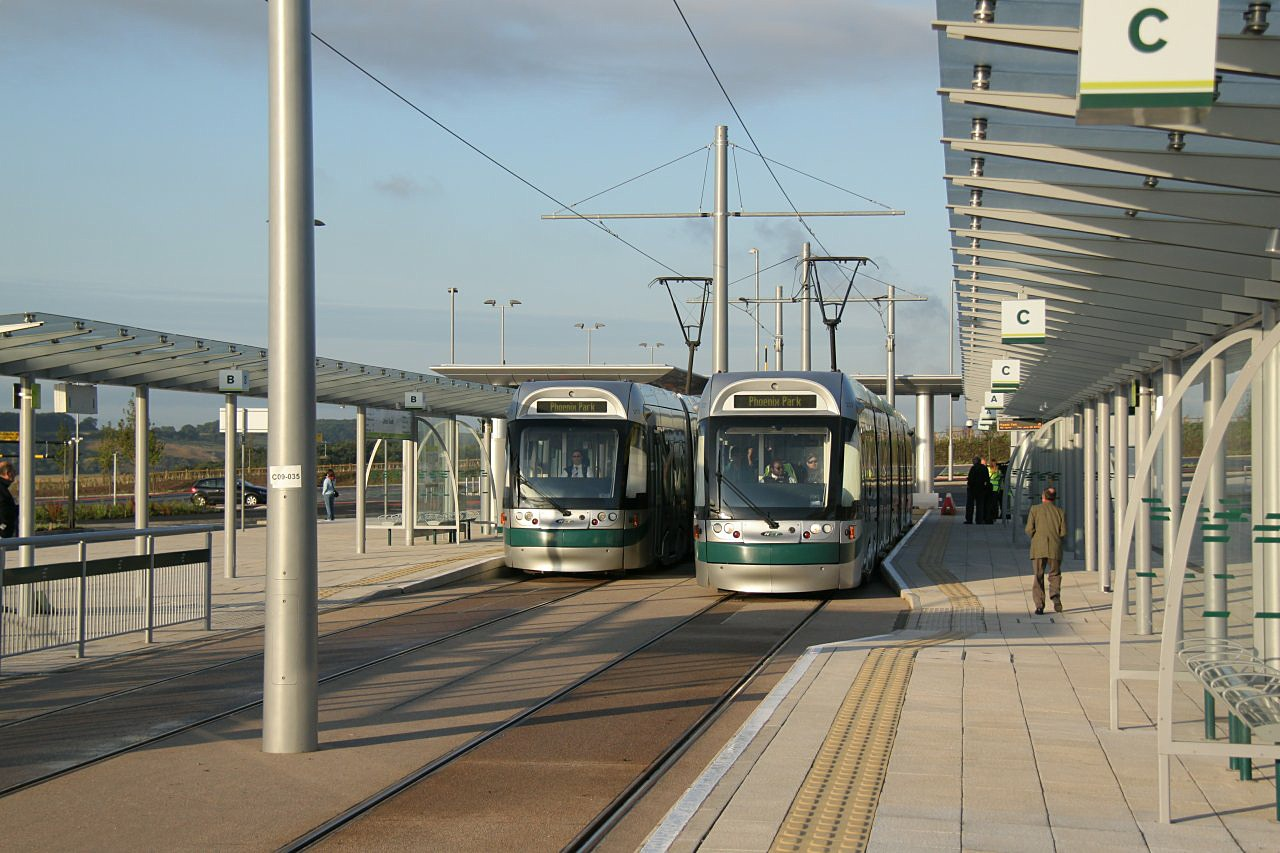

General information
- Location: Clifton, City of Nottingham; England
- Coordinates: 52°53′48″N 1°11′34″W
- System: Nottingham Express Transit tram stop
- Owner: Nottingham Express Transit
- Operator: Nottingham Express Transit
- Line: 2
- Platforms: 3
- Tracks: 2

Construction
- Structure type: At grade; on reserved track
- Accessible: Step-free access to platform

Key dates
- 25 August 2015: Opened

Services
Preceding station	NET	Following station
Summerwood Lane towards Phoenix Park	Line 2	Terminus
Location
- Location within Nottinghamshire

Clifton South is a tram stop and Park & Ride site on the Nottingham Express Transit (NET) network. It is situated in the Borough of Rushcliffe, just to the south-west of the large City of Nottingham suburb of Clifton, on the A453. The Park & Ride site has a capacity of over 1000 cars. There is also an interchange with local bus services.

The tram stop is the terminus of line 2 of the NET, to Phoenix Park via Clifton, Wilford and the centre of Nottingham. The stop comprises a pair of side platforms flanking the twin terminal tracks, with one of the platforms being long enough to accommodate, if necessary, two trams. Trams run at frequencies that vary between 4 and 8 trams per hour, depending on the day and time of day. A half-hourly express bus service, the Skylink Express, links the stop to East Midlands Airport.

The Clifton South stop opened on 25 August 2015, along with the rest of NET's phase two.

In 2023, extension of the NET to Clifton South was listed in the Department for Transport's list of projects to be funded by the cancellation of Phase 2 of High Speed 2, despite the tram stop already being operational for nearly a decade by that point.

== Gallery ==
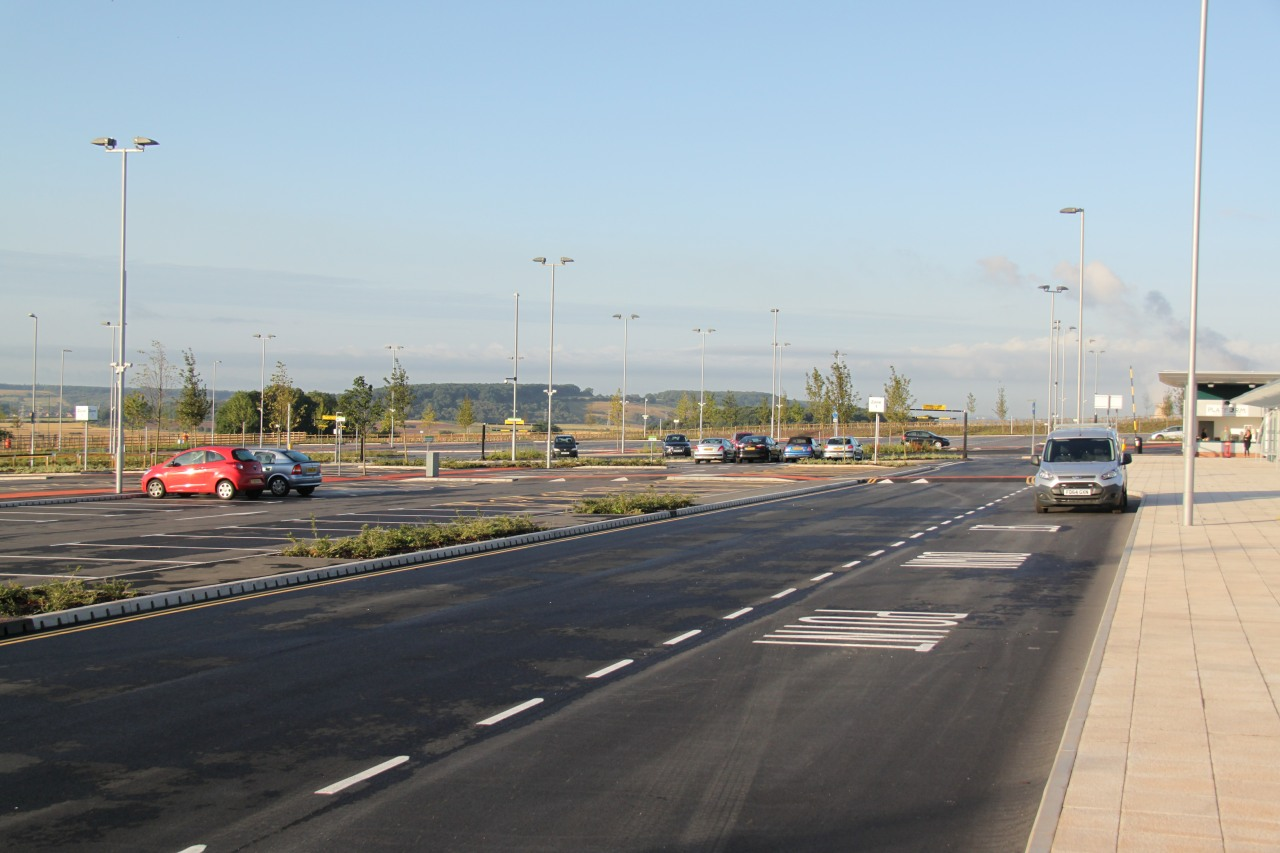
Part of the Park & Ride site

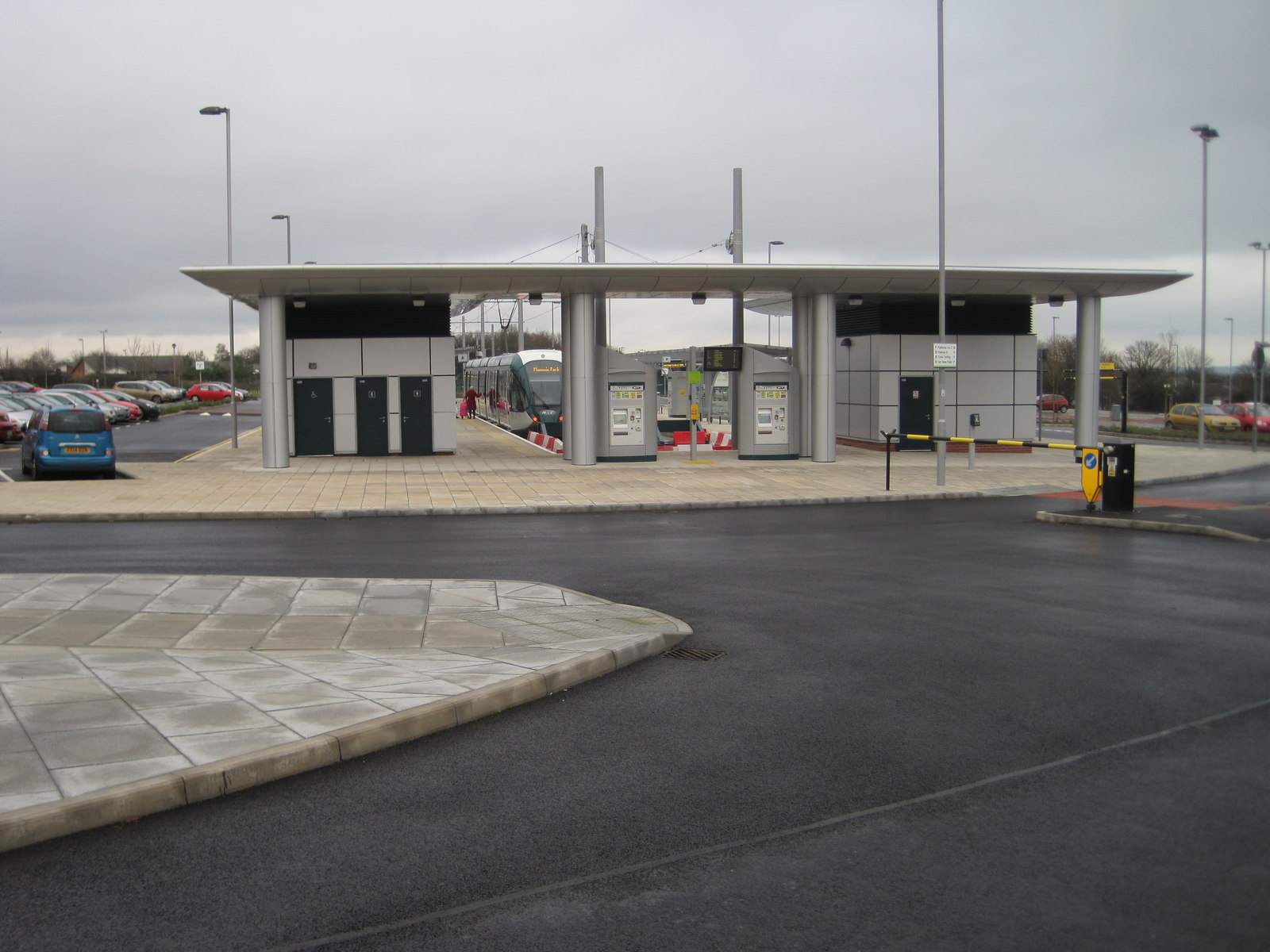
The tram stop seen from the bus interchange

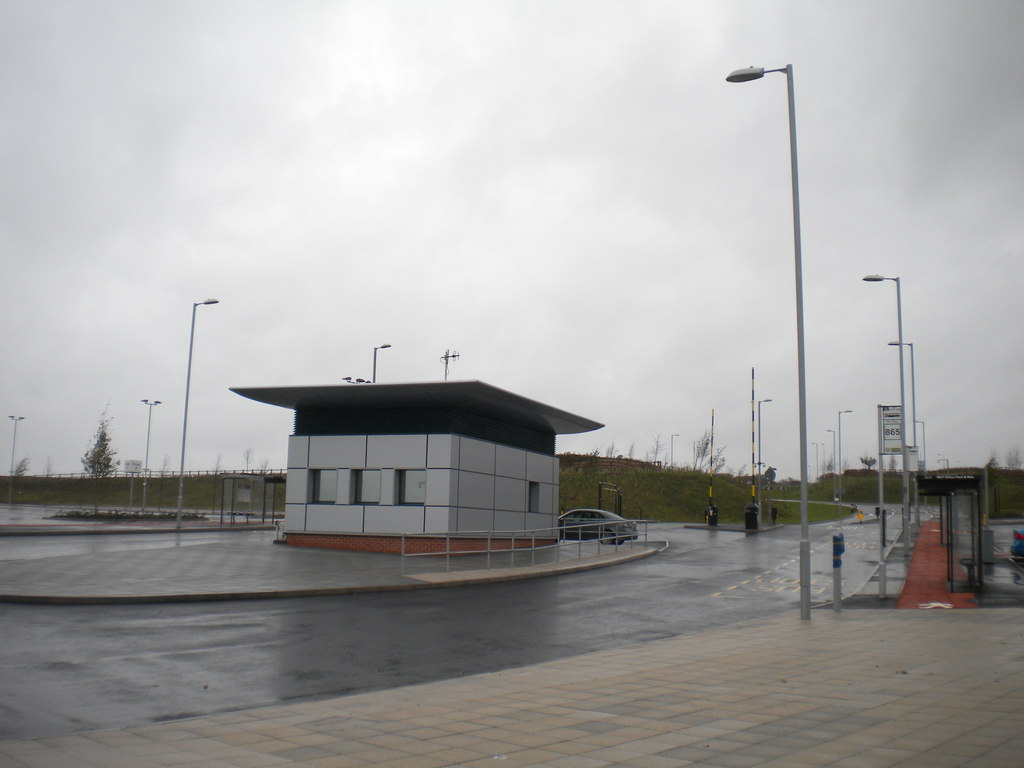
The bus interchange seen from the tram stop
