= Toton Lane tram stop =

Nottingham Express Transit tram stop

Toton Lane
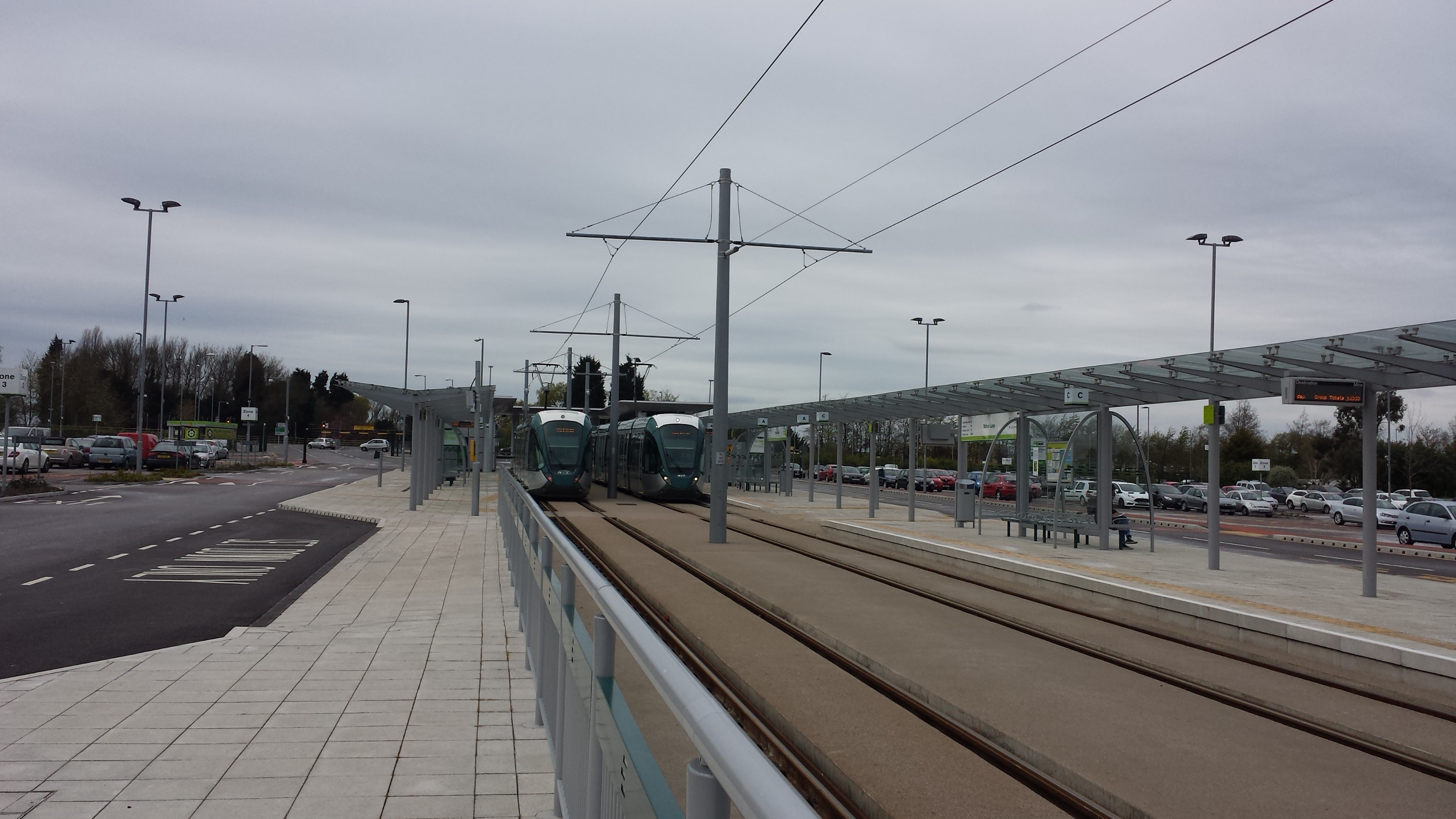

General information
- Location: Stapleford, Broxtowe; England
- Coordinates: 52°55′06″N 1°15′45″W
- System: Nottingham Express Transit tram stop
- Owner: Nottingham Express Transit
- Operator: Nottingham Express Transit
- Line: 1
- Platforms: 3
- Tracks: 2

Construction
- Structure type: At grade; on reserved track
- Accessible: Step-free access to platform

Key dates
- 25 August 2015: Opened

Services
Preceding station	NET	Following station
Inham Road towards Hucknall	Line 1	Terminus
Location
- Location within Nottinghamshire

Toton Lane is a tram stop and park and ride site on the Nottingham Express Transit network, serving the suburb of Chilwell and town of Stapleford, Broxtowe in Nottinghamshire, England.

== History ==
The stop opened on 25 August 2015, following the opening of the second phase of the network from Station Street, with branches to Clifton South and Toton Lane. Covering a total distance of 17 1/2 kilometres (11 mi), the extension saw the opening of two branch lines, as well as the addition of 28 tram stops to the network.

The stop comprises a pair of side platforms flanking the twin terminal tracks, with one of the platforms being long enough to accommodate, if necessary, two trams. It is situated to the west of Chilwell, north of Toton, and south of Stapleford, and is just 1 mile (1.6 km) along the Stapleford bypass (A52) from junction 25 of the M1 motorway. The park and ride site has a capacity of 1,400 cars. There is also an interchange with local bus services, and a kiosk.

== Services ==
As of January 2022, services operate at a 7–15 minute frequency between Hucknall and Toton Lane.

Rolling stock used: Alstom Citadis and Bombardier Incentro

== Gallery ==
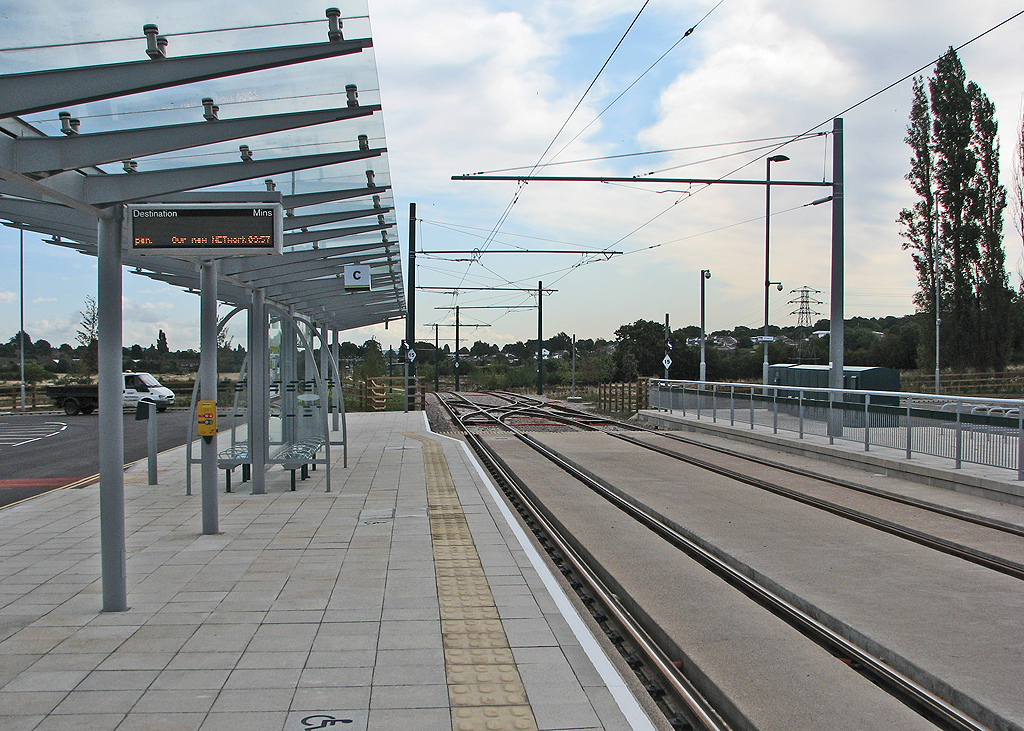
The tram stop looking towards Nottingham

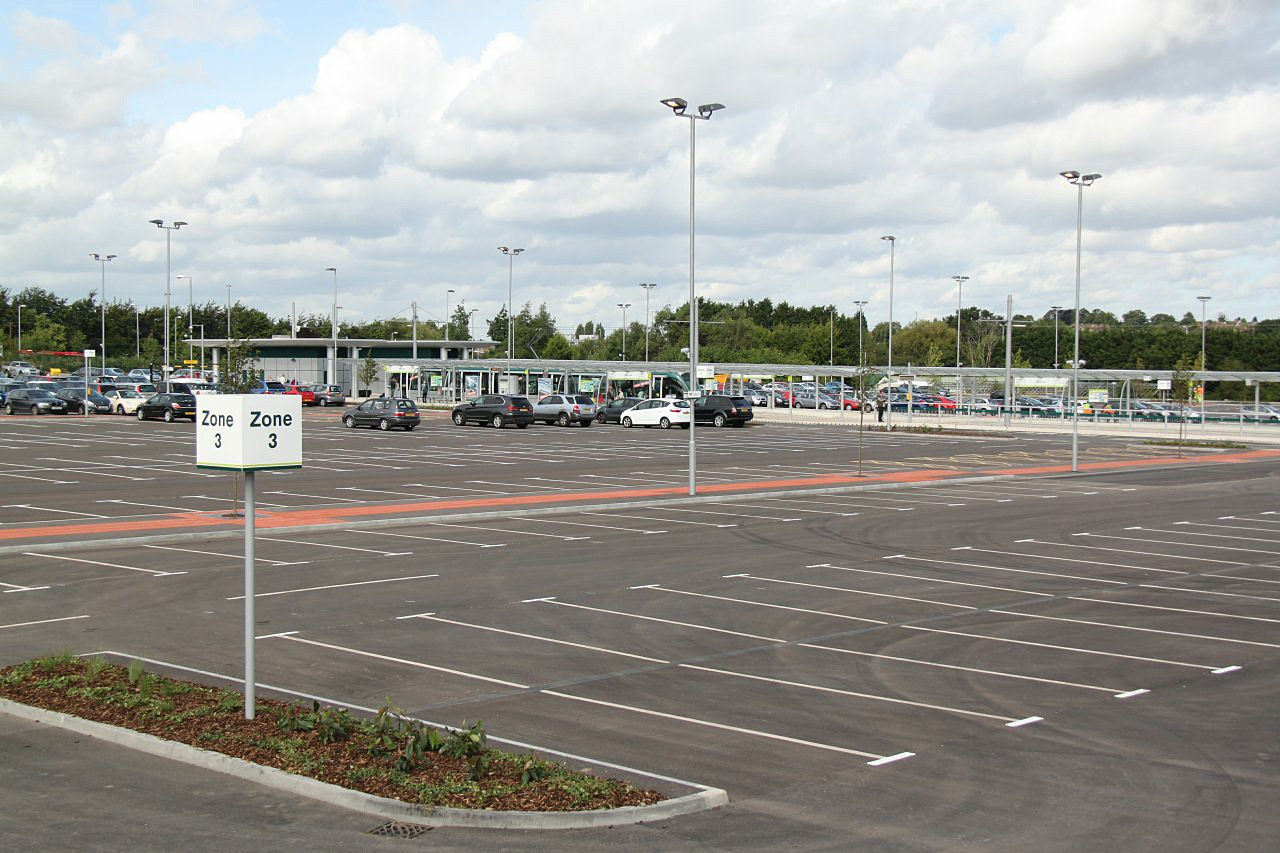
The tram stop seen from across part of the park and ride site

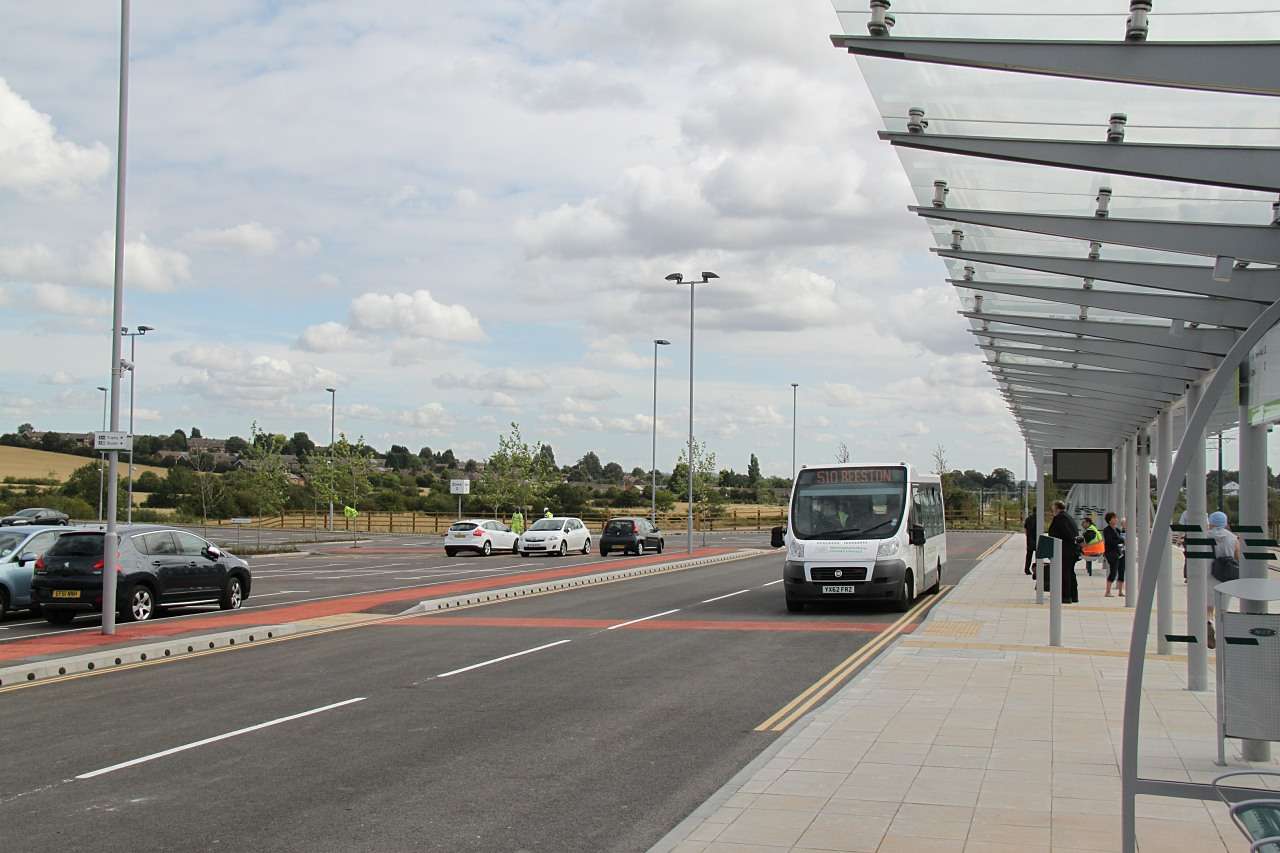
A connecting bus

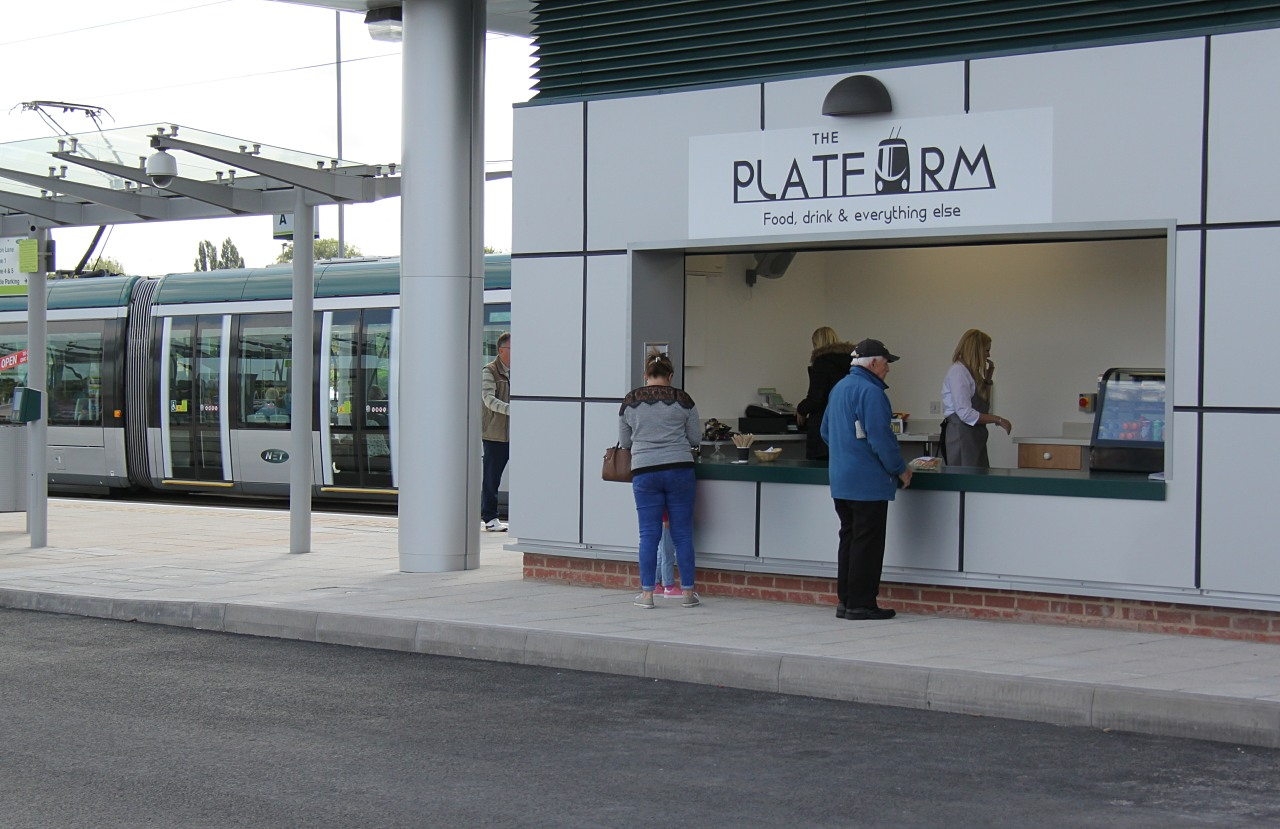
The kiosk
