= Hucknall station =

Railway station and tram terminus in Nottinghamshire, England

Hucknall
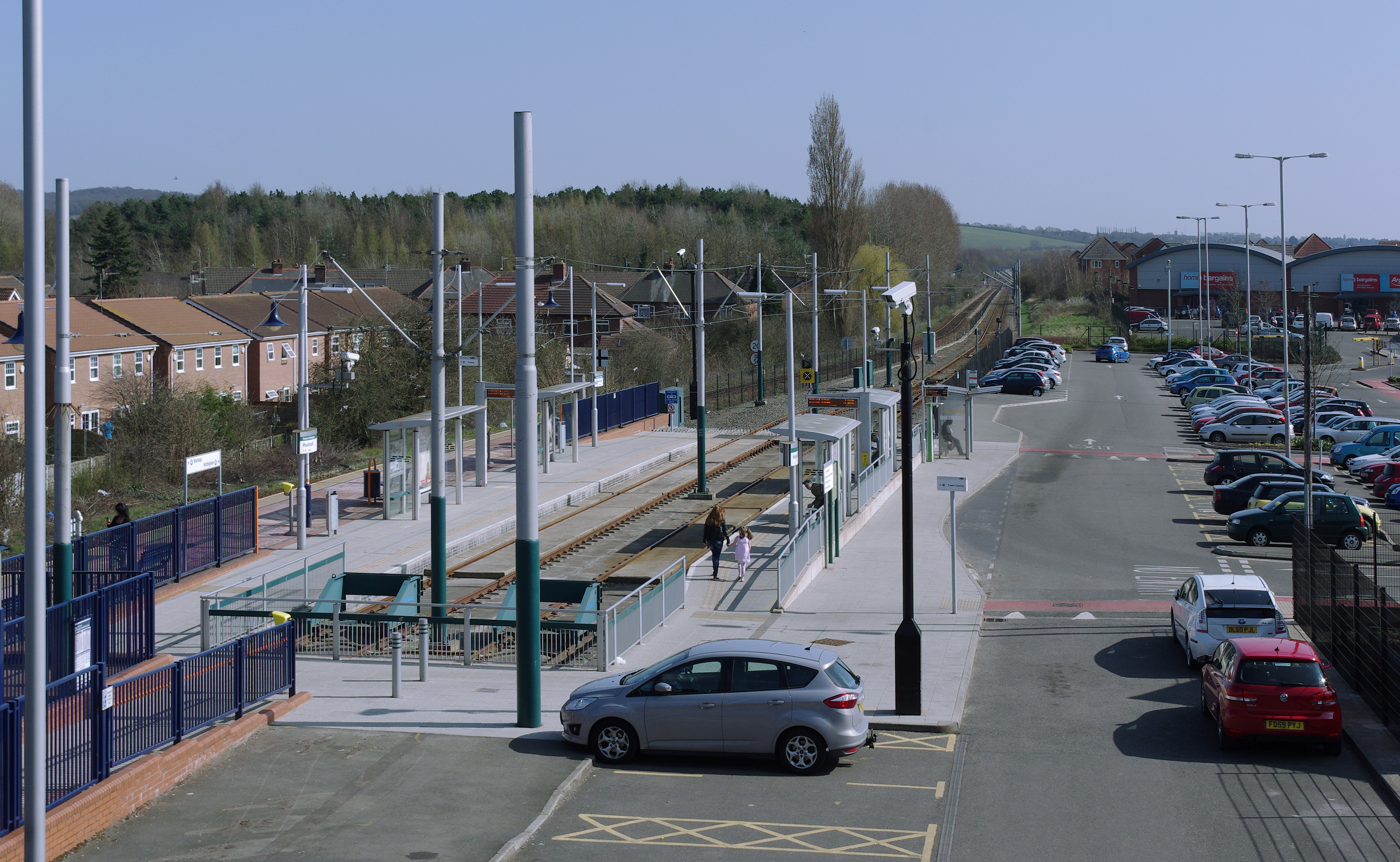

General information
- Location: Hucknall, Ashfield, England
- Coordinates: 53°02′19″N 1°11′45″W
- Grid reference: SK540493
- Owner: Network Rail, Nottingham Express Transit
- Operator: East Midlands Railway, Nottingham Express Transit
- Platforms: 3 (Note: Two platforms are used by Nottingham Express Transit services and one by National Rail)
- Tracks: 3

Other information
- Station code: HKN
- Classification: DfT category F2

History
- Original company: Midland Railway
- Pre-grouping: Midland Railway
- Post-grouping: London, Midland and Scottish Railway; London Midland Region of British Railways

Key dates
- 2 October 1848: Opened as Hucknall
- 22 December 1895: Resited
- 11 August 1952: Renamed Hucknall Byron
- 12 October 1964: Closed
- 17 May 1993: Reopened as Hucknall
- 9 March 2004: Joined the Nottingham Express Transit network

Passengers
- 2020/21: ▼34,688
- 2021/22: ▲83,164
- 2022/23: ▲0.121 million
- 2023/24: ▲0.153 million
- 2024/25: ▲0.169 million
Location
- Location within Nottinghamshire
Notes
- Passenger statistics from the Office of Rail and Road

Hucknall, formerly known as Hucknall Byron, is a railway station and tram stop in Hucknall, Nottinghamshire, England. It is located on the Robin Hood railway line, 5 miles (8 km) north of Nottingham, and is also the northern terminus of the Nottingham Express Transit (NET) tram line 1. The station has park and ride facilities, with nearly 450 parking spaces for use by both tram and train passengers.

== History ==
The station first opened as Hucknall on 2 October 1848, with the opening of the Midland Railway's line from Nottingham to Mansfield. It was located around 4 chains (260 ft; 80 m) from the current station site and was the first of several stations to serve the town, including the Great Northern's Hucknall Town and the Great Central Railway's Hucknall Central.

Hucknall station was relocated to its current site on 22 December 1895 and was renamed Hucknall Byron on 11 August 1952, to avoid confusion with the town's other stations. It was closed to passenger traffic, along with all the other stations on the line, on 12 October 1964; the railway line itself was retained for goods traffic.

On 17 May 1993, this line was reopened by British Rail to passenger traffic, as part of the new Robin Hood Line, and the station was reopened under its original name; the other Hucknall stations having closed in the meantime.

The tram stop opened on 9 March 2004, along with the rest of Nottingham Express Transit's first phase.

== Services ==
=== Railway ===
The railway has a single line and platform through the station, with the platform on the same side of the railway track as the tram stop. There is direct access from the railway platform to the tram platforms. Services are operated by East Midlands Railway.

During the weekday off-peak and on Saturdays, the station is generally served by an hourly service northbound to Mansfield and Worksop, and southbound to Nottingham. During peak hours, the station is also served by an additional two trains per day between Nottingham and Mansfield Woodhouse.

On Sundays, the station is served by a two-hourly service between Nottingham and Mansfield Woodhouse; there is no service to Worksop, but this is due to recommence at during the life of this East Midlands franchise.

| Preceding station | National Rail | Following station |
|---|---|---|
| Bulwell | East Midlands Railway Robin Hood Line | Newstead |
| | Historical railways | |
| Bulwell | Midland Railway Robin Hood Line | Linby |

=== Tram ===
Hucknall
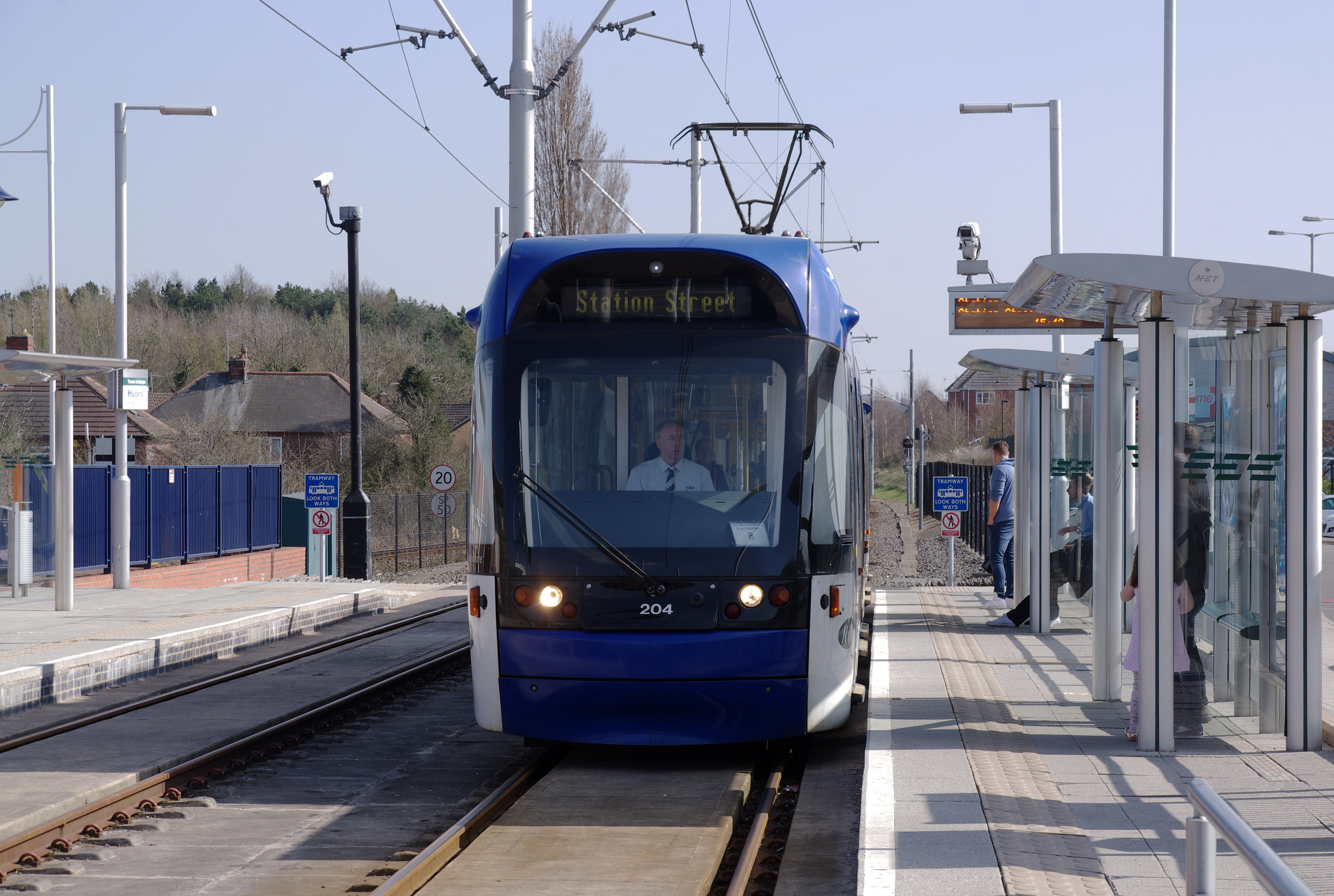

General information
- Location: Hucknall, Ashfield, England
- Coordinates: 53°02′18″N 1°11′45″W
- System: Nottingham Express Transit tram stop
- Owner: Nottingham Express Transit
- Operator: Nottingham Express Transit
- Line: 1
- Platforms: 2
- Tracks: 2

Construction
- Structure type: At grade; on private right of way
- Accessible: Step-free access to platform

Key dates
- 9 March 2004: Opened

Services
| Preceding station | NET | Following station |
|---|---|---|
| Terminus | Line 1 | Butler's Hill towards Toton Lane |
Location
- Location within Nottinghamshire

The tram stop has two terminal tracks. To the south, the line becomes single tracked as far as Butler's Hill.

With the opening of NET's phase two, Hucknall became the terminus of Line 1, which runs through the city centre to Beeston transport interchange and Toton Lane. Trams run at frequencies that vary between 4 and 8 trams per hour, depending on the day and time of day.

== Connections ==
TrentBarton's Connect Red/Blue bus services transport passengers to the town centre and the western estates, stopping adjacent to the tram stop. The Stagecoach East Midlands-operated 141 route connects passengers to the town centre, the eastern estate and the surrounding villages, stopping on the road bridge above the station or adjacent to the Tesco Extra supermarket.
