= Southchurch Drive tram stop =

Tram stop in Nottingham, England

Southchurch Drive North
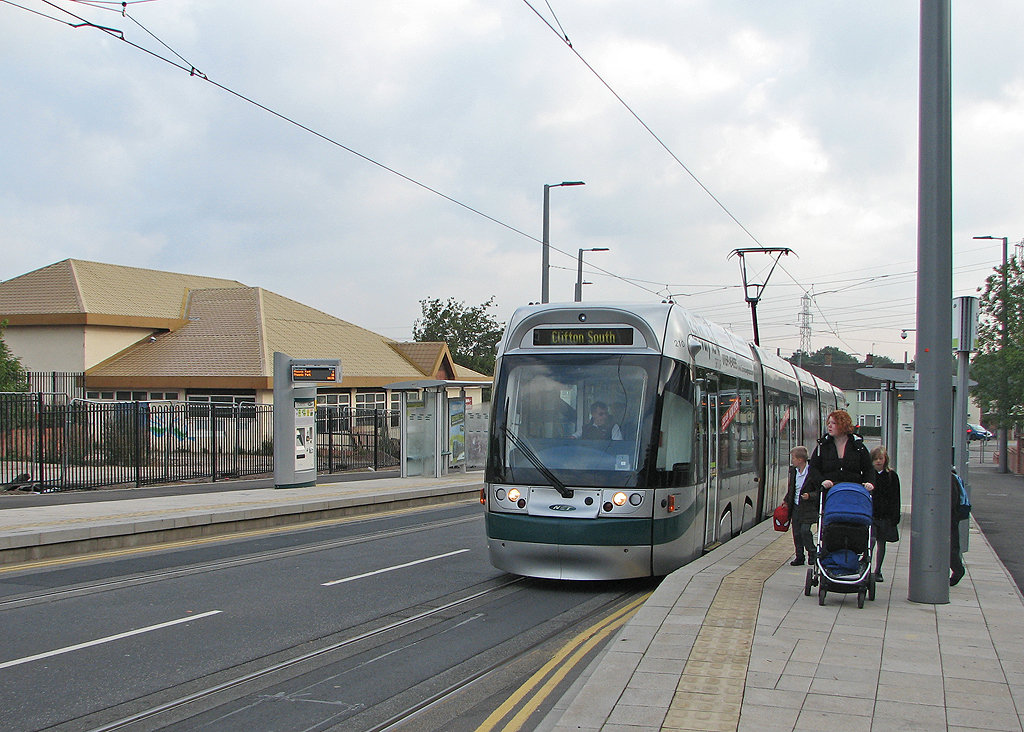

General information
- Location: Clifton, City of Nottingham; England
- Coordinates: 52°54′39″N 1°10′13″W
- System: Nottingham Express Transit tram stop
- Owner: Nottingham Express Transit
- Operator: Nottingham Express Transit
- Line: 2
- Platforms: 2
- Tracks: 2

Construction
- Structure type: At grade; on street
- Accessible: Step-free access to platform

Key dates
- 25 August 2015: Opened

Services
Preceding station	NET	Following station
Ruddington Lane towards Phoenix Park	Line 2	Rivergreen towards Clifton South
Location
- Location within Nottinghamshire

Southchurch Drive, also known as Southchurch Drive North, is a tram stop on the Nottingham Express Transit (NET) network in the city of Nottingham suburb of Clifton. It is situated on street track on Southchurch Drive near its junction with Farnborough Road, and is one of four such tram stops situated on or adjacent to Southchurch Drive, the others being Rivergreen, Clifton Centre and Holy Trinity.

The stop comprises a pair of side platforms flanking the running tracks. It is on line 2 of the NET, from Clifton via the city centre to Phoenix Park. Trams run at frequencies that vary between 4 and 8 trams per hour, depending on the day and time of day.

To the north of the tram stop, the line continues in the street for a short distance before heading onto a new reserved track alignment across country towards the former route of the Great Central main line, which it joins for the next part of its run towards the city centre.

Southchurch Drive stop opened on 25 August 2015, along with the rest of NET's phase two.
