= Clifton Village =

Clifton Village may refer to:

- Clifton Village, Nottinghamshire
- Clifton Village, Bristol
