= Nottingham Express Transit =

Light-rail tramway in Nottingham, England

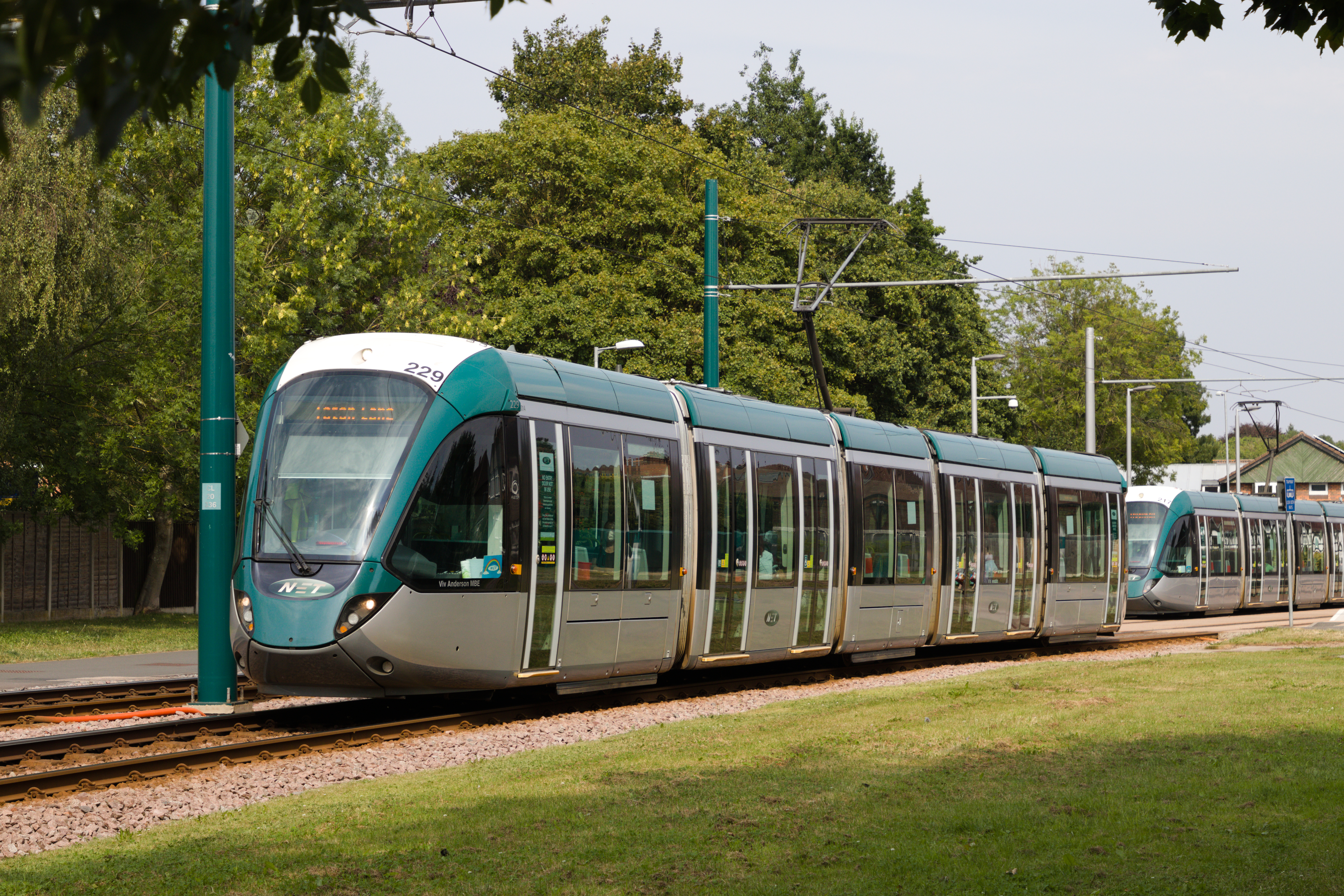
- A Citadis 302 tram in August 2020

Overview
- Owner: Nottingham City Council
- Area served: Nottingham
- Transit type: Tram
- Number of lines: 2
- Number of stations: 50
- Annual ridership: 15.6 million (2025/26) ▼1%
- Website: www.thetram.net

Operation
- Began operation: 9 March 2004; 22 years ago
- Operator: Tramlink Nottingham Ltd.
- Number of vehicles: 15 Bombardier Incentro AT6/5; 22 Alstom Citadis 302
- Headway: Peak – 7 mins (off peak 10–15 mins)

Technical
- System length: 32 km (20 mi)
- Track gauge: 1,435 mm (4 ft 8 1/2 in) standard gauge
- Electrification: 750 V DC overhead line
- Top speed: System max – 70 km/h (43 mph); Tram max – 80 km/h (50 mph)

Nottingham Express Transit (NET) is a 20-mile (32 km) tram system in Nottingham, England.

Greater Nottingham Light Rapid Transit Act 1994
- Act of Parliament
- Parliament of the United Kingdom
- Long title: An Act to confer on Nottinghamshire County Council and on Nottingham City Council powers for the development and operation of a light rail system of rapid passenger transport in the City of Nottingham and elsewhere in the County of Nottinghamshire; to authorise the construction of works and the acquisition of lands for those purposes; to authorise the said councils to transfer the undertaking established by this Act or any part thereof to Greater Nottingham Rapid Transit Limited or any other person; to confer further powers on the said councils; and for other purposes.
- Citation: 1994 c. xv

Dates
- Royal assent: 21 July 1994

Status: Current legislation

Text of statute as originally enacted

The concept of a modern tramway to reduce road congestion and promote urban renewal was formally identified during the late 1980s while detailed planning was undertaken during the early 1990s. The Greater Nottingham Light Rapid Transit Act 1994 authorising the project, then referred to as the Greater Nottingham Light Rapid Transport (GNLRT), received royal assent on 21 July 1994 and central government financing was provided in subsequent years. In March 2000, a 30-year Private Finance Initiative (PFI) concession was awarded to the Arrow Light Rail Ltd consortium, which became responsible for the design, funding, building, operation and maintenance of the line. On 9 March 2004, the system opened to the public; it was originally 8.7 miles (14 km) long and served 23 tram stops, having been constructed at a cost of £200 million, a sum equivalent to £361 million at 2025 price.

The tramway's early ridership exceeded expectations, with 8.4 million journeys in 2004-5 and 9.7 million in 2005–6, against targets of 8 million and 9 million respectively; its performance led to the scheme's second phase, under which the tramway would more than double in size, promptly receiving approval on 25 October 2006. Financial backing for the second phase was not fully secured until 2011, while the original concession to operate the tramway was terminated on 16 December 2011. A new consortium, known as Tramlink Nottingham Limited, was finalised in December 2011. Construction of the second phase commenced in 2012, work was protracted and the extension was finally opened on 25 August 2015, roughly two years earlier than had been originally planned.

Line 1 runs between Toton Lane and Hucknall, features a total of 33 or 34 tram stops, depending on direction, and has a journey time throughout of 62 minutes. Line 2 runs between Clifton South and Phoenix Park, features 27 or 28 tram stops, depending on direction, and has a journey time throughout of 47 minutes.

Presently, the tramway is operated and maintained by Nottingham Trams Ltd on behalf of the Tramlink Nottingham consortium. It has a total length of 32 km (20 mi) As of 2024, the rolling stock consists of 15 Bombardier Incentro AT6/5 and 22 Alstom Citadis 302. Various changes and extensions to the tramway have been mooted, from additional stops along the two existing lines to multiple whole new lines being constructed.

== History ==
=== Planning and construction of phase one ===
Nottingham and the surrounding urban area is the UK's seventh largest and third fastest-growing urban area. Traditionally, Nottingham's economy was to a large extent based on manufacturing and coal mining, and in the second half of the 20th century the area was affected by the decline in these industries. High population density, a road system constrained by crossings of the River Trent, and a concentration of retail and entertainment outlets in the city centre led to road congestion and high bus usage. In the late 1980s, Nottingham City Council and Nottinghamshire County Council identified the possibility of using a modern tramway as a means of stimulating urban renewal, as well as tackling road congestion.

Plans began from around 1989, by Nottingham Development Enterprise, under Malcolm Reece. Studies in Grenoble in France had shown that up to 20% of commuters switched from their car. Possible routes were developed by Bob McKittrick of Scott Wilson Kirkpatrick. The first route was to Hucknall, but would go through the Victoria Centre tunnel and along the Forest Recreation Ground. Other routes would follow the railway to Carlton and the railway to Beeston and Toton; the consulting engineers' advice was to follow along railway routes, where possible. In a 1989 report problems were identified with running through the Victoria Centre basement car park, requiring a brand-new tunnel. By 1991, the route under the Victoria Centre was dropped, to follow the present route. It would be twenty-five years before the other routes would be built.

The scheme was known as the Greater Nottingham Light Rapid Transport – GNLRT. The Greater Nottingham Light Rapid Transport Act 1994 received Royal Assent on 21 July 1994. At that point, the scheme required £68m of government funding.

During December 1998, Minister of State for Transport John Reid confirmed the availability of £167 million funding for a new tram system, to be known as Nottingham Express Transit, to run between Nottingham and Hucknall.

In March 2000, the joint promoters, Nottingham City Council and Nottinghamshire County Council, awarded a 30-year Private Finance Initiative (PFI) concession to the Arrow Light Rail Ltd consortium, with responsibility for the design, funding, building, operation and maintenance of the line. The consortium was made up of Adtranz (later subsumed into Bombardier Transportation), who were responsible for the trams, Carillion, who were responsible for the infrastructure, Transdev and Nottingham City Transport (NCT).

As originally built, the system was 8.7 miles (14 km) long and served 23 tram stops. The construction cost a total of £200 million, a sum equivalent to £361 million at 2025 prices.

=== Opening of phase one ===
Nottingham Express Transit began operation in March 2004, with a line operating north from a terminal at Station Street, just to the north of Nottingham railway station, through the city centre, branching to serve twin termini at Hucknall and Phoenix Park. Once the line was complete, operation was sub-contracted by Arrow Light Rail to the Nottingham Tram Consortium (NTC), an equal partnership between Transdev and Nottingham City Transport.

The new line proved successful, leading to an increase of public transport use for the Nottingham urban area of 8% in the five years to 2008, together with a less than 1% growth in road traffic, compared to the national average of around 4%. The line itself exceeded expectations, with 8.4 million journeys in 2004–2005 and 9.7 million in 2005–2006, against targets of 8 million and 9 million respectively. By 2007–8, ridership had reached 10.2 million journeys. This performance bolstered the case for the construction of new lines.

On 27 July 2009, the GMB trade union held a strike in protest at a proposed pay cut of 0.6% offered by Nottingham Tram Consortium. A maximum of five trams out of a normal service of 13 ran from 06:00 until 18:00 on the Hucknall route, with replacement buses running a shuttle from Phoenix Park.

=== Planning and construction of phase two ===
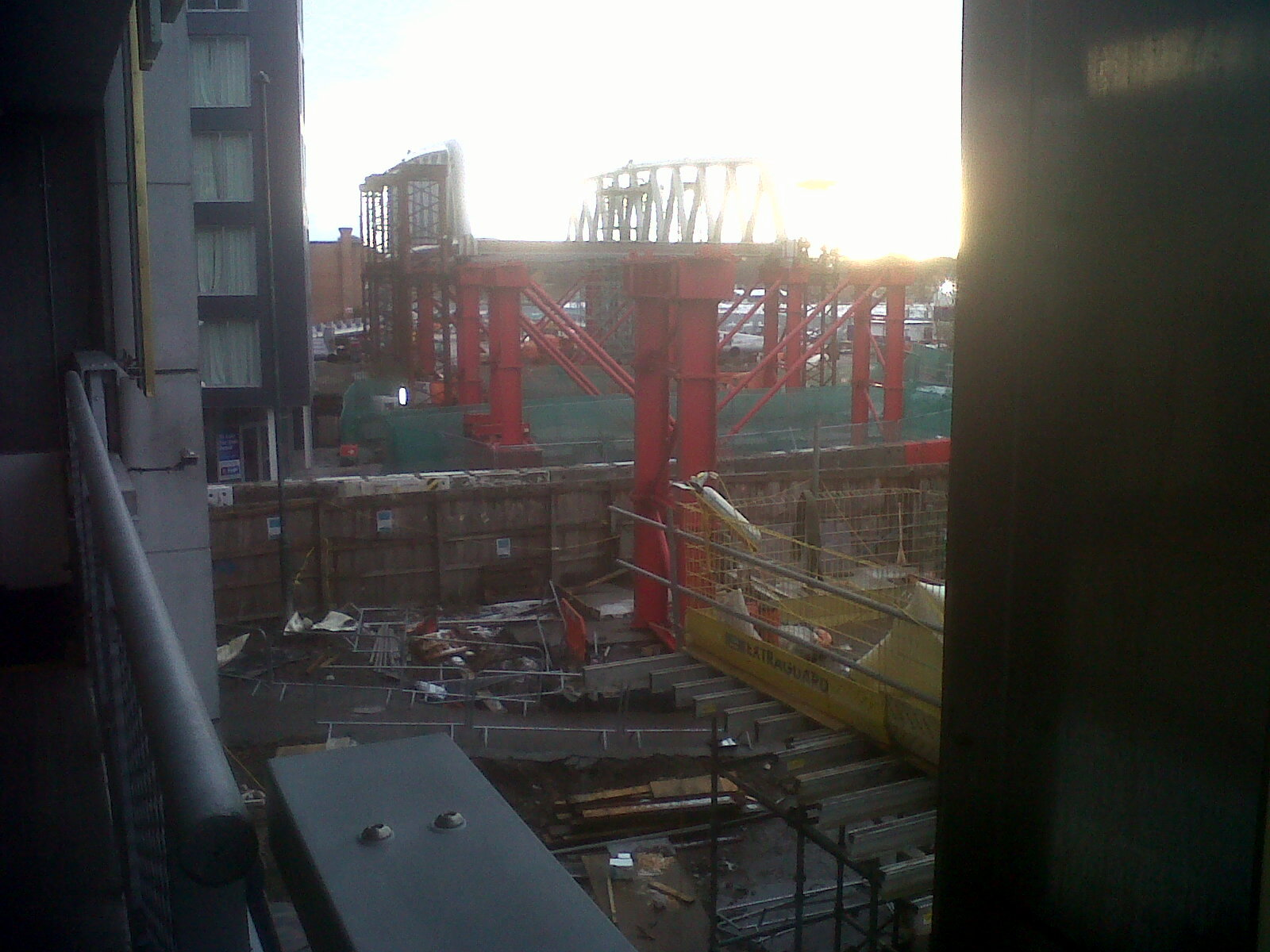
Supports for new tram bridge; the bridge awaiting sliding into position on 26 January 2013.

In January 2003, even before the first phase had opened, the two councils had decided to start consultation on a second phase to serve the urban areas south and west, with routes to Clifton via Wilford, and to Chilwell via Beeston.

Approval for phase two was given on 25 October 2006 with the British Government agreeing to provide up to £437 million in Private Finance Initiative (PFI) credits. The local councils will also provide up to £141 million in PFI credits. The two local councils (Nottinghamshire County and Nottingham City Councils) voted on 22 February 2007 and 3 March 2007 respectively to table an application for a Transport and Works Act Order. The City and County Councils’ application for the order were available to view from 26 April 2007 to 7 June 2007 when it was submitted to the Secretary of State for Transport for consideration. A public inquiry was held in December 2007. The project was given the go-ahead by the government on 30 March 2009.

Following the local elections in 2009, the county council indicated that it was no longer willing to contribute financially to the project, so Nottingham City Council decided to cover the shortfall and be the sole promoter. The county council confirmed that it would not obstruct the project. Funding was approved by the government on 31 July 2009. Selecting and appointing the contractor was expected to take two years. Building work was expected to begin in 2011, in two phases, with trams running from 2014. The scheme survived the 2010 Comprehensive Spending Review ordered by the government, and on 24 March 2011 the government confirmed that funding had been approved.

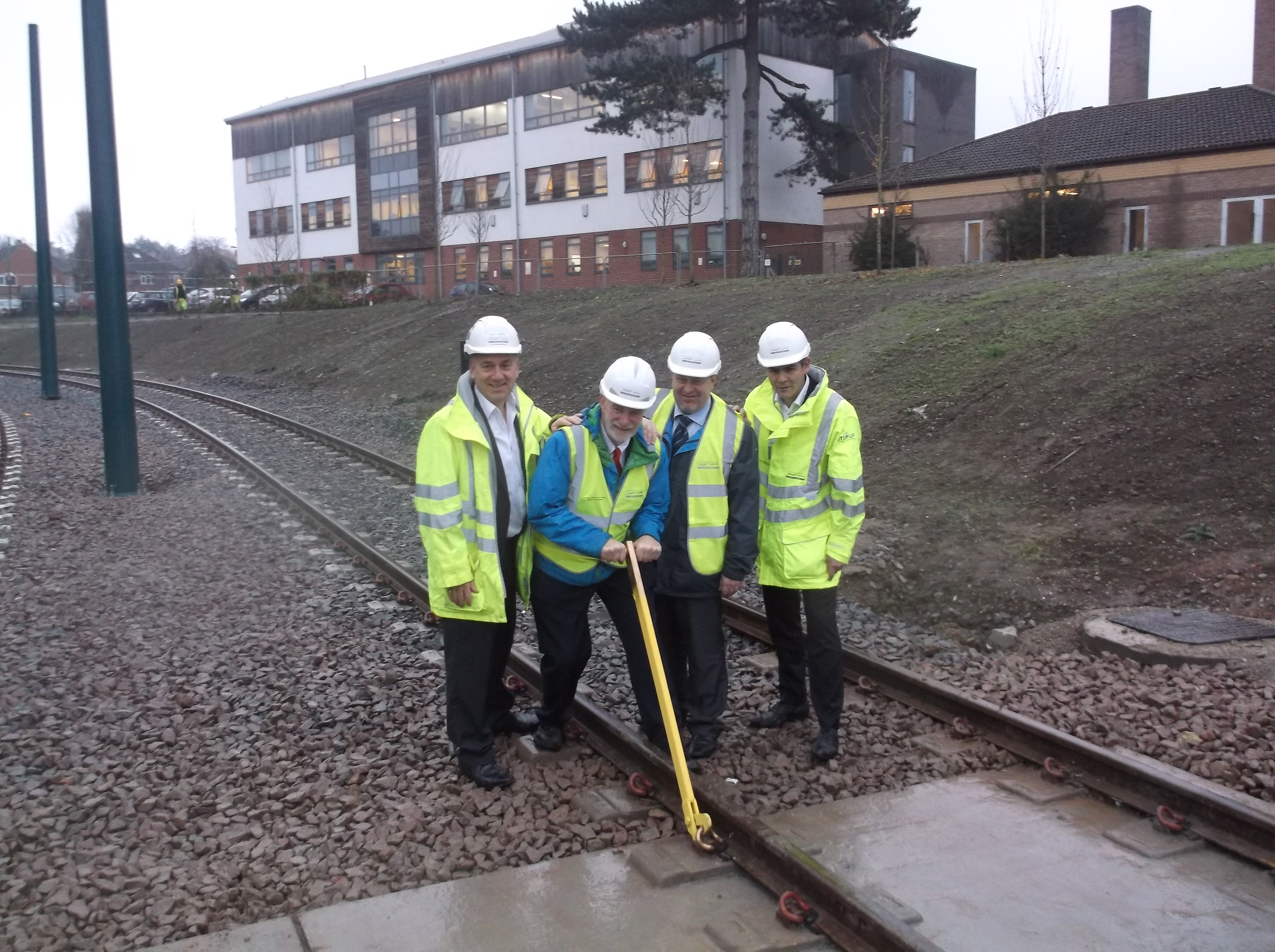
Golden spike ceremony held on 27 November 2014 to mark the completion of trackwork on the Beeston and Chilwell line

As part of this process, the concession to operate the existing system was terminated. A new concession put out to tender to design and build phase two, to operate and maintain the existing system in the meantime, and to operate and maintain the extended system once completed. Although Arrow Light Rail bid, they lost out to a new consortium known as Tramlink Nottingham Limited, made up of Meridiam (30 per cent), OFI InfraVia (20 per cent), Alstom Transport (12.5 per cent), Keolis (12.5 per cent), Vinci Investments (12.5 per cent), and the Wellglade Group (12.5 per cent). As with the previous consortium, operation was further sub-contracted to a consortium of Keolis (80%) and Wellglade (20%), with maintenance sub-contracted to Alstom Transport. As a result of Wellglade's ownership of Trent Barton, who operate bus services in the Nottingham area, the new concession was referred to, and approved by, the Office of Fair Trading. The finalised contract was signed on 15 December 2011.

The severing of the link between NET and Nottingham City Transport, which affected joint ticketing arrangements, may have contributed to a fall in passenger numbers on phase one. This started in 2008 with the recession of that year, reducing the total number of journeys to a minimum 7.4 million by 2013. By 2014–15, passenger numbers had rebounded to 8.1 million.

Construction of phase two started in 2012. There were construction delays and by the end of 2014 it was at least six months behind schedule. There were complaints from residents affected by works and traders whose businesses have been damaged by the late running construction. Track laying was completed on 11 December 2014.

=== Opening of phase two ===
The two new bridges that form a major part of phase two were both officially named in 2014, in advance of their actual use by trams. The bridge across the Clifton Boulevard (A52) near the Queen's Medical Centre was named the Ningbo Friendship Bridge to acknowledge the links between the city of Ningbo, in China, and the University of Nottingham. The naming took place on 11 June 2014, and was undertaken by the vice-mayor of Ningbo. The bridge constructed over Nottingham railway station was officially opened on 17 October 2014 and named the Karlsruhe Friendship Bridge to acknowledge the technical support provided by Nottingham's twin city Karlsruhe. The opening event also unveiled a new tram named in honour of the late Jim Taylor who developed the initial vision for the tram system.

The first powered test run on a short section of the line took place in the early hours of Friday 22 August 2014, running from Station Street via The Meadows to Wilford, before returning to Station Street. With the completion of track laying and electrification work in early 2015, testing began in earnest.

The first section of phase two to open to the public was the new tram station above Nottingham railway station, which replaced the Station Street stop as the southern terminus of the line on 27 July 2015. The remainder of phase two finally opened at 06:00 on 25 August 2015, with the route from Toton Lane Park and Ride into Nottingham running the first public service.

During the planning and construction phases, the initial system (including both branches) was often referred to as line 1, with the line 2 name used for the new line to Clifton and line 3 for the new line to Toton. With the publication of the timetables covering through running between the initial system and phase two, this terminology was changed, with line 1 referring to the through service from Hucknall to Toton, and line 2 to the service from Phoenix Park to Clifton.

== Network ==
Geographical map of the network

The network consists of two lines that cross the city, running together on a common section for the middle part of their journey, including the city centre section. Line 1 runs between Toton Lane tram stop and Hucknall, features a total of 33 or 34 tram stops, depending on direction, and has a journey time throughout of 62 minutes. Line 2 runs between Clifton South and Phoenix Park, features 27 or 28 tram stops, depending on direction, and has a journey time throughout of 47 minutes. The system has a total length of 20 mi (32 kilometres).

Trams on each line run at frequencies that vary between four and eight trams per hour, depending on the day and time of day. These services combine to provide up to 16 trams per hour on the common section.

=== Toton branch (line 1) ===
The southern branch of line 1 commences at Toton Lane, a large Park & Ride site that is to the west of Chilwell, north of Toton and south of Stapleford, and is just 1 mile (1.6 km) along the Stapleford bypass (A52) from junction 25 of the M1 motorway. The line then proceeds through Chilwell, largely on its own right of way and serving tram stops at Inham Road, Eskdale Drive, Bramcote Lane and Cator Lane, before joining the street at High Road – Central College. From here it runs on street through Beeston, serving tram stops at Chilwell Road, Beeston Centre and Middle Street before reaching the tram stop at University Boulevard. Beeston Centre provides a specially designed interchange with local bus services.

From University Boulevard, the line proceeds on segregated track alongside the road of the same name to the University of Nottingham tram stop, which serves the University of Nottingham's main campus. From here it uses the Ningbo Friendship Bridge to cross the Clifton Boulevard (A52) to the elevated stop at the Queen's Medical Centre, before descending back to street level again. Street stops at Gregory Street, NG2 and Meadows Way West follow, before reaching the junction with the Clifton branch (line 2).

The branch is 9.8 km (6.1 mi) long, of which about half is segregated. There are 15 tram stops on the branch, and the journey between Toton Lane and Nottingham railway station takes 30 minutes. The line from Toton to just before University Boulevard is in the Borough of Broxtowe, with the rest of the branch in the City of Nottingham.

=== Clifton branch (line 2) ===
The southern branch of line 2 commences at Clifton South, a large Park & Ride site that lies just to the south-west of the large suburb of Clifton, on the A453. It then proceeds on street through the heavily built up Clifton Estate, serving stops at Summerwood Lane, Holy Trinity, Clifton Centre, Rivergreen and Southchurch Drive North, before entering a newly created right of way out of the estate.

The new right of way joins the route of the former Great Central Railway, serving stops on the old railway formation at Ruddington Lane, Compton Acres and Wilford Lane before reaching the village of Wilford. Here it diverges from the former railway and serves Wilford Village tram stop before crossing the River Trent on the former Wilford Toll Bridge, long closed to motor vehicles, which has been widened to allow pedestrians and cyclists to continue to use it. It then runs through the Meadows residential area, serving tram stops at Meadows Embankment and Queens Walk before reaching the junction with the Toton Branch (line 1).

The branch is 7.6 km (4.7 mi) long, of which almost two thirds is segregated. There are 12 tram stops on the branch, and the journey between Clifton South and Nottingham railway station takes 21 minutes. The stop at Clifton South is in the Borough of Rushcliffe, and the line between just before Ruddington Lane and just before Wilford Village forms the boundary between the Borough of Rushcliffe and the City of Nottingham. The rest of the branch, including the section through the Clifton Estate, is within the City of Nottingham.

=== Common section (lines 1 & 2) ===
The two southern branches unite at a junction to the south of Nottingham railway station, which is situated on the southern edge of the city centre. The tramway crosses above the station platforms on its own dedicated bridge, the Karlsruhe Friendship Bridge, that also carries a tram stop that is directly connected to the station concourse.

From Nottingham station the common section runs north through the city centre, serving stops at Lace Market, Old Market Square and the Royal Centre. Leaving the city centre, the line continues, calling at Nottingham Trent University and High School before reaching The Forest. To the north of here is a section of about 1 km (0.62 mi), where northbound and southbound trams follow different streets, crossing at each end to run on the 'wrong side'. The line serves different stops in different directions, with northbound trams stopping at Noel Street, Beaconsfield Street and Shipstone Street, while southbound trams stop at Radford Road and Hyson Green Market. The two tracks rejoin at Wilkinson Street, where the depot is situated. Between the station and Wilkinson Street, trams run in the street, but all other traffic is heavily restricted or, in some cases, banned altogether. There are Park & Ride sites at the Forest Recreation Ground and Wilkinson Street.

North of Wilkinson Street, the route joins a former Midland Railway alignment, which it shares with the Robin Hood railway line. The railway and tram lines run next to each other, segregated by a fence, with tram stops at Basford, David Lane and Highbury Vale. At Highbury Vale, the two tram lines again diverge.

The whole common section lies within the City of Nottingham.

=== Hucknall branch (line 1) ===
Line 1 continues to run alongside the Robin Hood line north of Highbury Vale as far as its terminus. The line serves Bulwell railway station where railway interchange is provided. North of this station, the tram line becomes single track as far as its terminus at Hucknall railway station, albeit with passing loops at each of the three intermediate stops at Bulwell Forest, Moor Bridge and Butler's Hill. Hucknall station provides interchange with the Robin Hood line, as well as being a Park & Ride site. The branch is within the City of Nottingham to a point just past Moor Bridge, beyond which it is in Ashfield District.

=== Phoenix Park branch (line 2) ===
Line 2 diverges from line 1 at Highbury Vale, serving two separate platforms connected to the Line 1 platforms by footpath. Beyond Highbury Vale, the line becomes single track as far as its terminus at Phoenix Park, a Park & Ride site, following the alignment of a former colliery railway. Cinderhill is the only intermediate stop on this branch, and the only stop on the system where trams use the same single platform in both directions. The whole branch is within the City of Nottingham.

== Rolling stock ==
=== Current fleet ===
NET currently operates the following fleet:

Class	Image	Type	Top speed		Length metres	Capacity			In service	Orders	Fleet numbers	Routes operated	Built	Years operated
Class	Image	Type	mph	km/h	Length metres	Std	Sdg	Total	In service	Orders	Fleet numbers	Routes operated	Built	Years operated
Bombardier Incentro AT6/5		Tram	50	80	33	62	129	191	15	—	201–215	All lines	2002–2003	2004–present
Alstom Citadis 302		Tram	43	70	32	58	144	202	22	—	216–237	All lines	2013–2014	2014–present
Total									37	—				

==== Bombardier Incentro AT6/5 ====
The system started with 15 Incentro AT6/5 trams, similar to those used on the Nantes tramway, built by Bombardier at Derby Litchurch Lane Works. The Flexity Outlook had also been considered and rejected as its large single-leaf doors did not comply with British door-alarm regulations. The AT6/5 trams are articulated in five sections and have a top speed of 80 kilometres per hour (50 mph).

On 8 March 2013, NET announced that all trams would be refurbished and receive a new livery and interior. Refurbishment was completed by September 2014. During 2019, another refurbishment was commenced, which includes replacing the floors and internal fittings, a new livery to match the Citadis trams, and a mechanical overhaul to improve reliability. Tram 203 was the first to be returned to service on 10 May 2019.

==== Alstom Citadis 302 ====
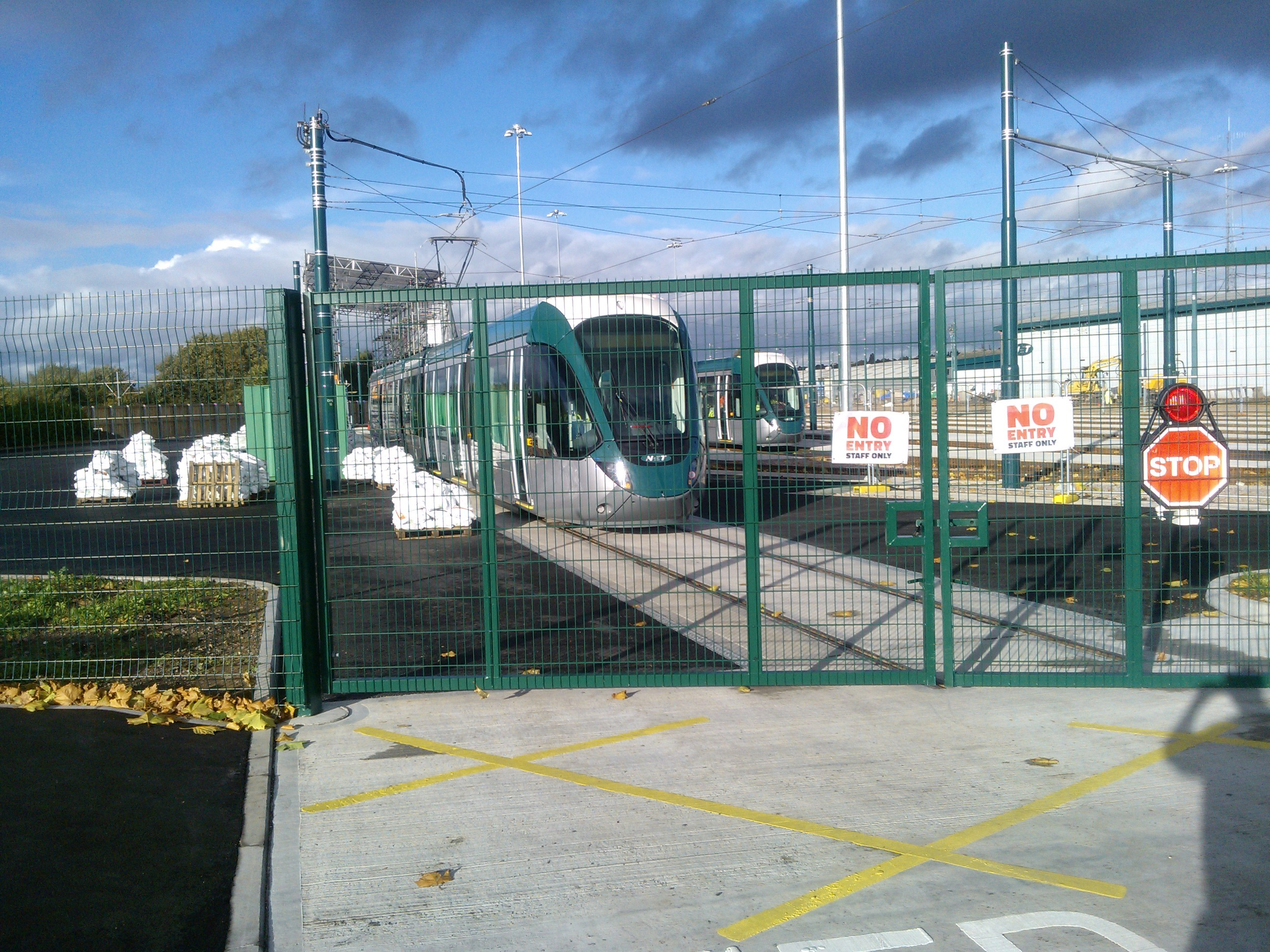
A pair of new NET Citadis trams at Wilkinson Street depot

Twenty-two new Alstom Citadis 302 trams were ordered in preparation for the Phase Two extensions to Beeston and Clifton. They have been specially designed to fit in with the operation's pre-existing fleet and to have a 35-year operating life with a forecast annual mileage of roughly 90,000 km. Each tram has a maximum speed of 70 km/h and can carry up to 274 people.

The trams are stored and maintained at the Wilkinson Street depot, which was expanded as part of the phase two works. The first Citadis tram (216) arrived at the depot on 10 September 2013. Along with the current Incentro fleet, they ran test operation on the new lines from Summer 2014 and also on the current network. The first Citadis trams (216–221) entered passenger service for the day on 27 July 2014, as part of a trial for the new timetable, which was then introduced on 26 August 2014.

=== Ancillary vehicles ===
NET have a road-rail-equipped Unimog truck. A battery-powered shunter is used to move trams on non-electrified tracks within the depot.

=== Naming ===
Each tram in the network is named after "a local hero of the past or present". In November 2015, a tram was named after local screenwriter, playwright and actor William Ivory. In December 2021, a tram was named after Martyn Poliakoff.

A list of tram names, along with details can be found the NET website.

Number	Name
201	Torvill and Dean
202	DH Lawrence
203	William "Bendigo" Thompson
204	Erica Beardsmore
205	Lord Byron
206	Angela Alcock
207	Mavis Worthington
208	Dinah Minton
209	Sid Standard
210	Sir Jesse Boot
211	Robin Hood
212	William Booth
213	Mary Potter
214	Dennis McCarthy MBE
215	Brian Clough
216	Dame Laura Knight
217	Carl Froch
218	Jim Taylor
219	Alan Sillitoe
220	Sir Martyn Poliakoff
221	Stephen Lowe
222	Mary Earps
223	Colin Slater
224	Vicky McClure's Our Dementia Choir
225	Doug Scott
226	Jimmy Sirrel and Jack Wheeler
227	Sir Peter Mansfield
228	Local Armed Forces Heroes
229	Viv Anderson MBE
230	George Green
231	Rebecca Adlington
232	William Ivory
233	Ada Lovelace
234	George Africanus
235	David Clarke
236	Sat Bains
237	Stuart Broad

== Fares and ticketing ==
All tickets are purchased in advance – passengers need to buy a ticket or validate a smart card before they board the tram. There are ticket machines at all tram stops, where passengers can buy single, return, day and weekly tickets using cash or credit/debit card; tickets can also be bought on the NET app, NETGO! Ticket options such as Robin Hood smartcards and season passes are available on the website and at the NET Travel Centre in the City Centre. Various concessionary schemes are also in place. The validators at each stop also accept payments by contactless credit and debit card including Apple Pay and Android's Google Wallet for single and day fares without the need to buy a physical ticket.This originally was done with onboard conductors walking up and down the tram(like the Sheffield Supertram) which was used up until 2014 when they were taken over by Tramlink opting for Ticket machines on platforms.

== Services ==
=== Cycle parks ===
Under a scheme run by Nottingham City Council, the city has covered secure cycle parks that feature CCTV, lighting, Citycard access controlled doors and, at some sites, Citycard activated lockers and 24 hour access. Nottingham Cycle Parks are available at the following tram stops: Clifton Centre, Clifton South, Hucknall, Nottingham Station, Phoenix Park, Toton Lane and Wilkinson Street.

Access was originally free, with a one-off £5 registration charge. However, from July 2020, the council has introduced a revised charging structure, with an annual charge of £7.50, reduced to £5.25 for those paying by annual direct debit.

== Corporate affairs ==
=== Ownership and structure ===
NET is run as a concession by a consortium known as Tramlink Nottingham Limited, to finance, build, operate and maintain two new tram lines (known as phase two) and to operate and maintain the initial tram line (phase one), until 20 March 2034 for the grantor, Nottingham City Council.

Tramlink Nottingham Limited's parent company is Tramlink Nottingham (Holdings) Limited, which in turn is owned by the following shareholders:

Shareholder	Interest
Meridiam Infrastructure NET s.a.r.l.	30.001%
InfraVia NET S.A.	19.999%
Alstom Transport UK (Holdings) Ltd	12.500%
Keolis (UK) Ltd	12.500%
Vinci UK Developments Ltd	12.500%
Wellglade Ltd	12.500%
Total	100.000%

Operations are sub-contracted to Nottingham Trams Limited, a consortium of Keolis (80%) and Wellglade (20%), with maintenance sub-contracted to Alstom Transport.

=== Business trends ===
The consortium company Tramlink Nottingham Limited has produced annual accounts since April 2011, when it took over the concession, and NET passenger revenue and passenger numbers are published by the Department of Transport.

The key available trends in recent years for Nottingham Express Transit are (years ending 31 March):

	2010	2011	2012	2013	2014	2015	2016	2017	2018	2019	2020	2021
Turnover (Note: From Tramlink Nottingham Ltd's Annual Report and Statement of Accounts) (£M)			6.9	21.6	21.8	22.5	44.5	60.6	61.5	63.2	63.8	48.8
Net profit (Note: From Tramlink Nottingham Ltd's Annual Report and Statement of Accounts) (£M)			−2.5	4.3	3.3	0.2	−15.0	−48.5	−18.8	−22.5	−22.1	−21.4
Passenger revenue (Note: As defined in the DfT Light Rail and Tram Survey (Table LRT0301a)) (£M)	7.9	9.0	8.4	8.5	8.3	8.8	13.6	17.8	19.1	20.6	21.3	5.4
Number of passengers (M)	9.0	9.7	9.0	7.4	7.9	8.1	12.2	16.4	17.8	18.8	18.7	3.4
Number of trams (at year end)	15	15	15	15	26	37	37	37	37	37	37	37
Notes/sources												

Activities in the financial year 2020/21 were severely reduced by the impact of the coronavirus pandemic; during the year Tramlink Nottingham received a Covid grant of £18.5 million from the Department for Transport to maintain essential services.

=== Passenger numbers ===
Detailed passenger journeys since Nottingham Express Transit commenced operations on 9 March 2004 were:

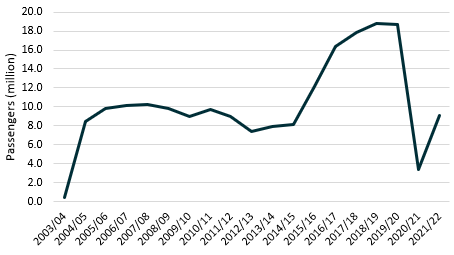
Number of passengers on Nottingham Express Transit from 2003/04 to 2022/23

Estimated passenger journeys made on NET per financial year (to 31 March)
Year	Passenger journeys (M)	Year	Passenger journeys (M)	Year	Passenger journeys (M)	Year	Passenger journeys (M)
2003–04	0.4	2010–11	9.7	2017–18	17.8	2024–25	15.7
2004–05	8.5	2011–12	9.0	2018–19	18.8		
2005–06	9.8	2012–13	7.4	2019–20	18.7		
2006–07	10.1	2013–14	7.9	2020–21	3.4		
2007–08	10.2	2014–15	8.1	2021–22	9.1		
2008–09	9.8	2015–16	12.2	2022–23	14.4		
2009–10	9.0	2016–17	16.4	2023–24	15.5		
Estimates from the Department for Transport

== Future developments ==
=== Additional routes ===
During the development of NET a number of possible additional routes around the city were considered, although there are no detailed plans for these.

However, in 2009, during the tendering process for phase two, documents contained nine possible routes:

- Hucknall to Linby.
- Phoenix Park to Kimberley and/or Watnall
- Nottingham to West Bridgford and then Gamston/Tollerton/Edwalton/Ruddington.
- Queen's Medical Centre to Arnold, via Basford.
- Nottingham to Gedling.
- Nottingham to Gamston.
- Chilwell to Ilkeston.
- Clifton to East Midlands Parkway or East Midlands Airport.
- Chilwell to Stapleford town centre and/or Sandiacre.

The documentation also raised the possibility of tram-train lines from Nottingham to Gedling and/or Bingham, and to Ilkeston.

=== Extension of route 2 to Kimberley ===
Kimberley, Eastwood & Nuthall Tram Action Group (KENTAG) campaigns for an extension from Phoenix Park to Eastwood and Kimberley. In December 2012, Nottingham City Council agreed to seek money to conduct a feasibility study on the route. In a major setback for tram proponents, in December 2014 Broxtowe Borough Council voted to reject a proposal to help fund a feasibility study into a line to Kimberley, due to the problems and delays of Lines 2 and 3. Richard Robinson, Labour Councillor for Kimberley, said the plan was always to bring the proposals back to the table. He said: "The vote in December was a roadblock put in our way, but we will overcome it". Councillors voted 19 to 13 in favour of Cllr Robinson stepping down pending the outcome of an inquiry after he admitted on Radio Nottingham to encouraging a pro-tram campaigner to flood local media with positive letters, while using aliases to make them appear local.

In 2015, Broxtowe Borough Council (jointly with British Land) commissioned a £55,000 study from Mott MacDonald to look into all transport options to reduce congestion along the A610 corridor though Broxtowe. It considered four potential tram routes to the Kimberley retail park. This estimated that the cost of the extension could reach £168 million.

=== Extension of route 1 to serve HS2 at Toton and Derby ===
News that a station for the proposed HS2 line (the East Midlands Hub) was likely to be built on the site of Toton sidings, only a short distance from the Toton Lane terminus has fuelled speculation that the line could be extended to the new station. In November 2015 there was a proposal for the tram network to be extended from Toton to Derby. Two routes were later proposed by the D2N2 local enterprise partnership for the route to Derby. The first route would be via the A52 while the second would be via Borrowash and Spondon. Land has been protected in planning application for housing developments between the Toton Lane terminus and Toton Sidings.

=== Extension of route 2 to Fairham ===
By mid-2018, a short extension southwards beyond the Clifton South terminus was being investigated, in order to serve the 3,000-home Fairham development next to the A453 road.

== Special events ==
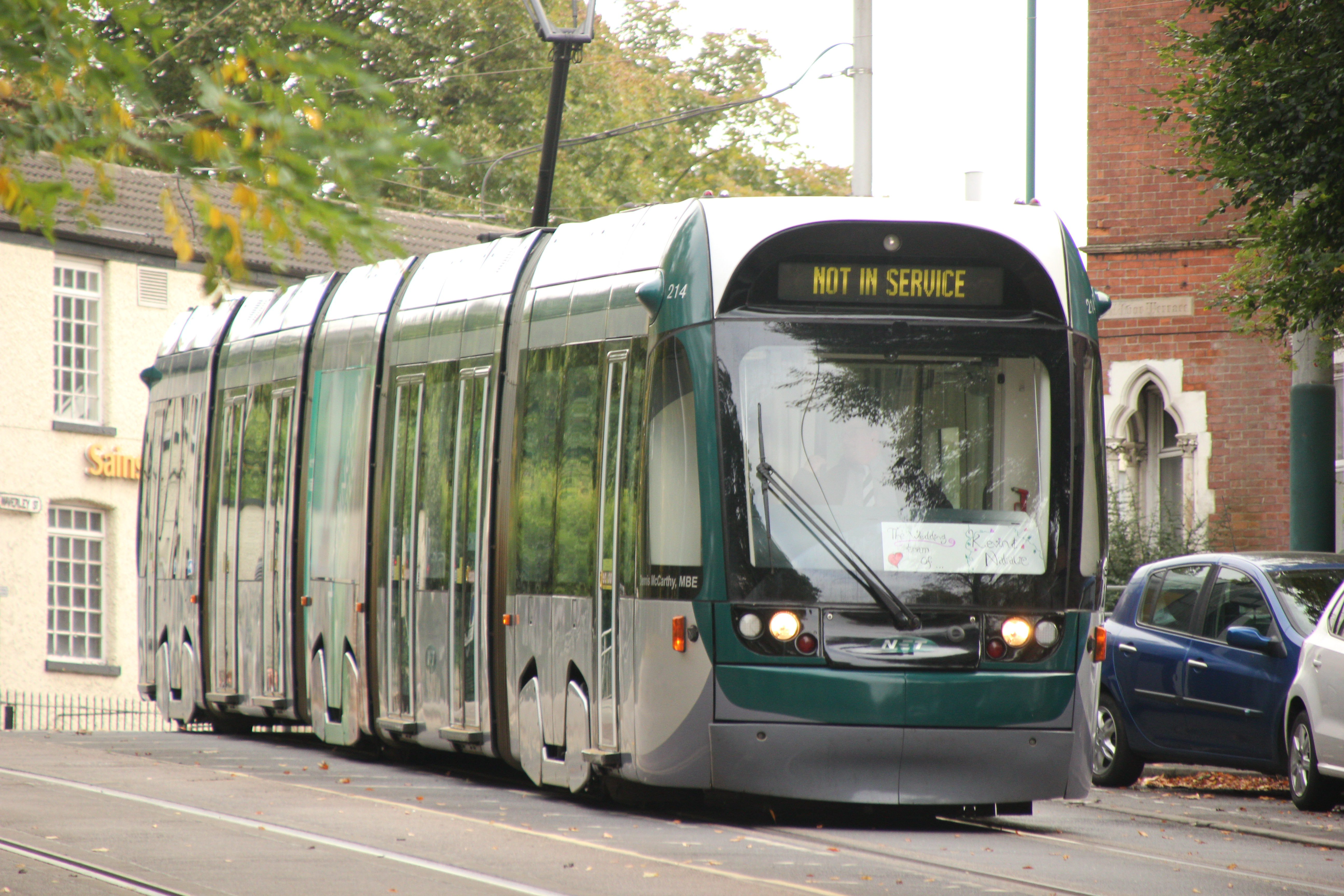
Tram 214 as a Wedding tram in 2021

- On 15 May 2004, a special tram transported members of the Tramway and Light Railway Society on a tour of crossovers and less used sections of track, prior to the society's Annual General Meeting.
- On 11 June 2014, a technical tour of the Nottingham Tram system was scheduled for delegates of the 9th Annual UK Light Rail Conference meeting at Nottingham Conference Centre.
- In May 2014, during the construction of the tram extension to Beeston, work was stopped and the road temporarily resurfaced so that a bride could travel to their wedding.
- In December 2014, tram 209 Sid Standard made a special journey between The Forest and Nottingham Market Square to bring Sid Standard's granddaughter to her wedding at Nottingham Council House.
- In May 2017, a bride and her group of bridesmaids travelled from Cinderhill tram stop to Old Market Square for her wedding at Nottingham Council House.
- On 7 May 2018, a tram tour of the Wilkinson Street Depot and other rarely used pieces of track was held to raise money for the National Tramway Museum at Crich and the Forever Stars stillbirth charity.
- On 2 June 2018, a special tram transported a wedding party from Station Street tram stop to Nottingham Trent University tram stop for their wedding at Nottingham Quaker Meeting House. The group had arrived from Beeston along the Nottingham Canal to Castle Lock by boat. Tram fares were donated to Macmillan Cancer Support.
- On 23 March 2019, a wedding group travelled from Phoenix Park tram stop to Nottingham Market Square for a wedding at Nottingham Council House, before continuing with a historic bus.
- On 23 October 2021, tram 214 Dennis McCarthy MBE was used as a wedding tram.

== Accidents and incidents ==
- On 6 October 2007, a 23-year-old man from Hucknall died after being hit by a tram when he stepped in front of it at Weekday Cross. His death was the first fatality since the trams commenced operation.
- On 11 November 2011, a 44-year-old man from Barnsley died after being hit by a tram following an incident close to Wilkinson Street depot.
- On 28 November 2012, a 13-year-old girl was hit by a tram on the Bayles and Wylies footpath crossing, on the border of Bestwood and Hucknall. She was rushed to hospital but later died from her injuries. The local MP remarked "I am mindful that this is not the first fatality on Nottingham's tramline and we obviously need to look at what's going wrong and how we can fix it." The crossing was subsequently closed and both it and the adjacent crossing, that took the footpath across a nearby railway line, were replaced by a footbridge.
- On 15 August 2016, late at night, a 51-year-old man was killed by a tram between David Lane and Basford. The man had got off at David Lane and was spotted walking along the tramway, but misunderstandings between control staff resulted in the tram driver not being warned of his presence.
- On 18 July 2017, a technical fault with a tram caused damage to overhead lines near Basford. The network was unable to run trams between David Lane and The Forest tram stops, causing major disruption over a three-day period.
- On 6 December 2017, a van collided with a tram on University Boulevard. Four passengers were slightly injured. The incident led to severe traffic jams across much of the city, and the tram service continued to be disrupted for many days afterwards.
- On 15 December 2017, the raincover of an empty pushchair became trapped in a tram door whilst departing Radford Road stop. After investigating, the Rail Accident Investigation Branch issued a recommendation to all UK-based tram-operators to undertake visual checks, in addition to the automatic electronic door interlocking detection, prior to a tram moving off.
- On 7 October 2020, a man was injured after he was hit by a tram on Victoria Street.
- During a heatwave in July 2022, services became extremely disrupted due to the withdrawal of almost half the fleet, as NET were not confident that the trams were fit for service in such conditions. Some trams were out of service until repairs were made.
- On 30 September 2022, a tram became derailed on the points at Highbury Vale, which caused significant disruption to services throughout the day, particularly affecting passengers travelling to the opening day of Goose Fair, which was taking place for the first time in three years at the Forest Recreation Ground. Services were resumed the following day.
- On 12 June 2023, tram 232 derailed whilst travelling southbound at Bulwell tram stop. At the end of the single-line section from Hucknall, a set of facing points had not properly reset after another tram travelled over them. When tram 232 then passed over them, its first bogie was routed differently to its second and third, leading to the tram derailing and striking the supporting overhead line equipment.
- On 2 June 2025 a tram derailed after a collision with a car at Queens Walk in The Meadows. The derailed tram then struck a support for the overhead line, damaging the overhead line equipment.
- On 19 February 2026, 228 collided with a bus at Inham Road in Chilwell. The tram was heavily damaged, derailed and a number of passengers were treated for minor injuries.
- On 26 February 2026, a tram's pantograph collided with the overhead lines whilst travelling under the Basford bridges, leading to suspension of service between the Forest Recreation Grounds to Bulwell and Highbury Vale. These disruptions were then compounded by a loss of communications during repairs on 27 and 28 February, which cancelled all tram services on the morning of 28 February.

== See also ==
- List of modern tramway and light rail systems in the United Kingdom
- Nottingham and District Tramways Company Limited (horse and steam tram service from 1878 to 1902)
- Nottingham Corporation Tramways (electric tram service from 1901 to 1936)
- List of town tramway systems in the United Kingdom
