= Fairham =

Coordinates: 52.890°N 1.195°W

- Suburb and civil parish
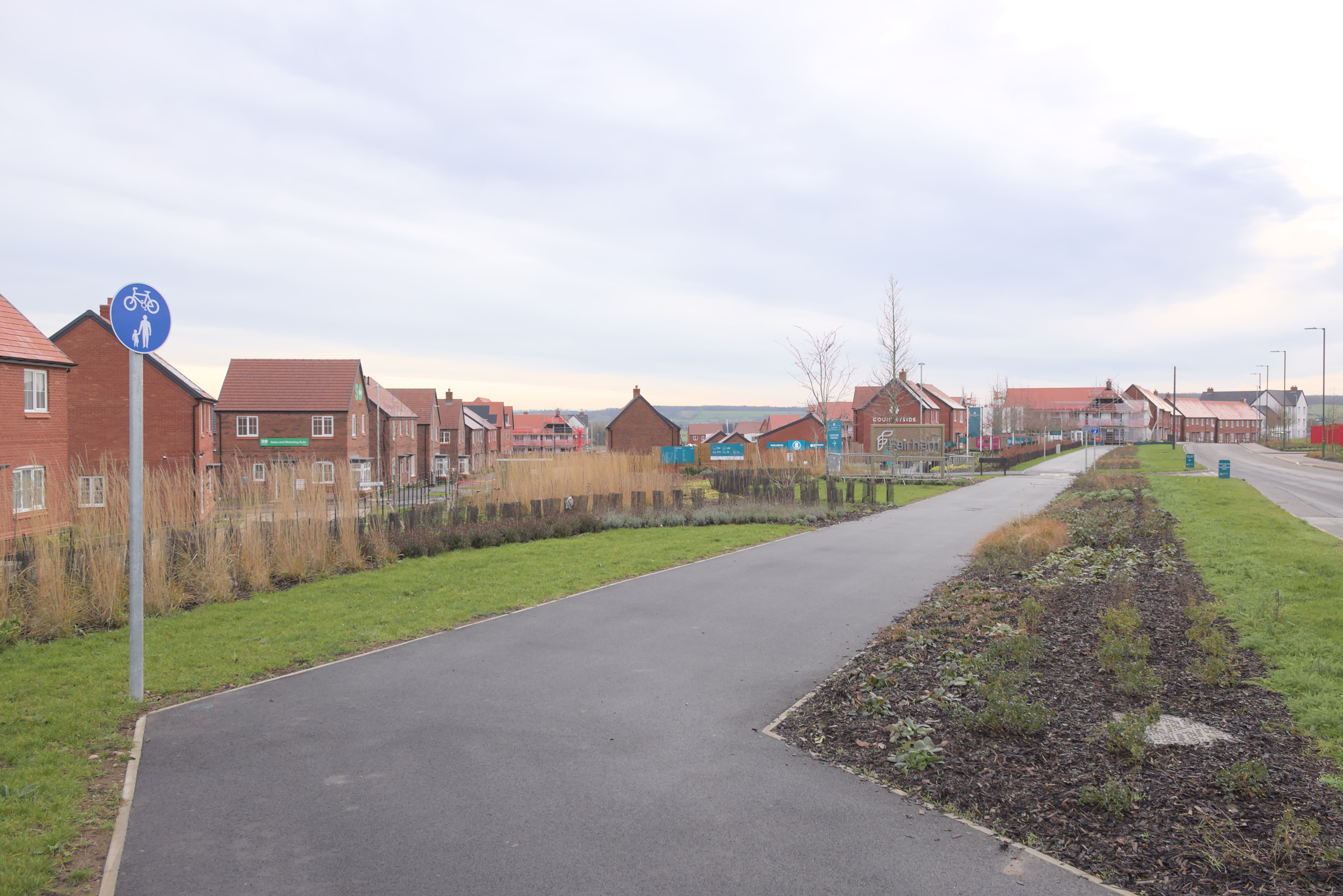
- Alvaredus estate, January 2026

- Logo

- Location within Nottinghamshire
- Area: 2.452 km^{2} (0.947 sq mi)
- Founded: 25 January 2018; 8 years ago (Note: Date of the approval of planning permission.)
- District: Rushcliffe
- Shire county: Nottinghamshire
- Region: East Midlands
- Country: England
- Sovereign state: United Kingdom
- Post town: NOTTINGHAM
- Postcode district: NG11
- Dialling code: 0115
- Police: Nottinghamshire
- Fire: Nottinghamshire
- Ambulance: East Midlands

Fairham is a suburb and planned community in the borough of Rushcliffe in Nottinghamshire. Described as an urban extension of Nottingham, it is located directly to the south of Clifton and roughly 4.5 miles (7.2 km) south-west of Nottingham's city centre and is set to be approximately 245.2 hectares (606 acres) in area.

== History ==
The earliest mentions of Fairham were in Rushcliffe Borough Council's local plan, adopted during December 2014, where it was simply referred to as a "sustainable urban extension" to the south of Clifton. The outline planning permission for Fairham, under the working title "Fairham Pastures", was granted by the council on 25 January 2018 as part of a scheme to create up to 13,500 new homes by 2028, with the suburb providing 3,000. Plans for a nearby business park were also approved in addition. Fairham's name is borrowed from the Fairham Brook, a tributary east of the suburb.

Development began in 2020, led by Homes England and Clowes Developments with ADAM Architecture serving as the site's urban designer, with the first houses built in early 2024. The suburb is expected to cost around £800 million to construct in its entirety.

On 7 June 2025, Rushcliffe Borough Council consulted residents within the Barton in Fabis civil parish on whether Fairham should become its own civil parish, with 97% of respondents agreeing. The borough council unanimously voted for the creation of the new council for Fairham on 5 March 2026; the parish was established on 1 April, with the council's first elections expected to take place during the 2027 United Kingdom local elections.

== Transport ==
Fairham is primarily served by Nottingham City Transport's '1' bus route. The route previously operated along Nottingham Road, but would be permanently rerouted to operate along Fairham Way from 14 April 2025 in conjunction with the road opening to the public and Nottingham Road being closed for long-term construction works.

A short extension of the Nottingham Express Transit beyond Clifton South into Fairham was being investigated by mid-2018. In March 2025, the East Midlands Combined County Authority approved £300,000 for a feasibility study into potential expansions for the transit, with the suburb being one of the possible candidates.
