= Compton Acres tram stop =

Tram stop in Nottinghamshire, England

Compton Acres
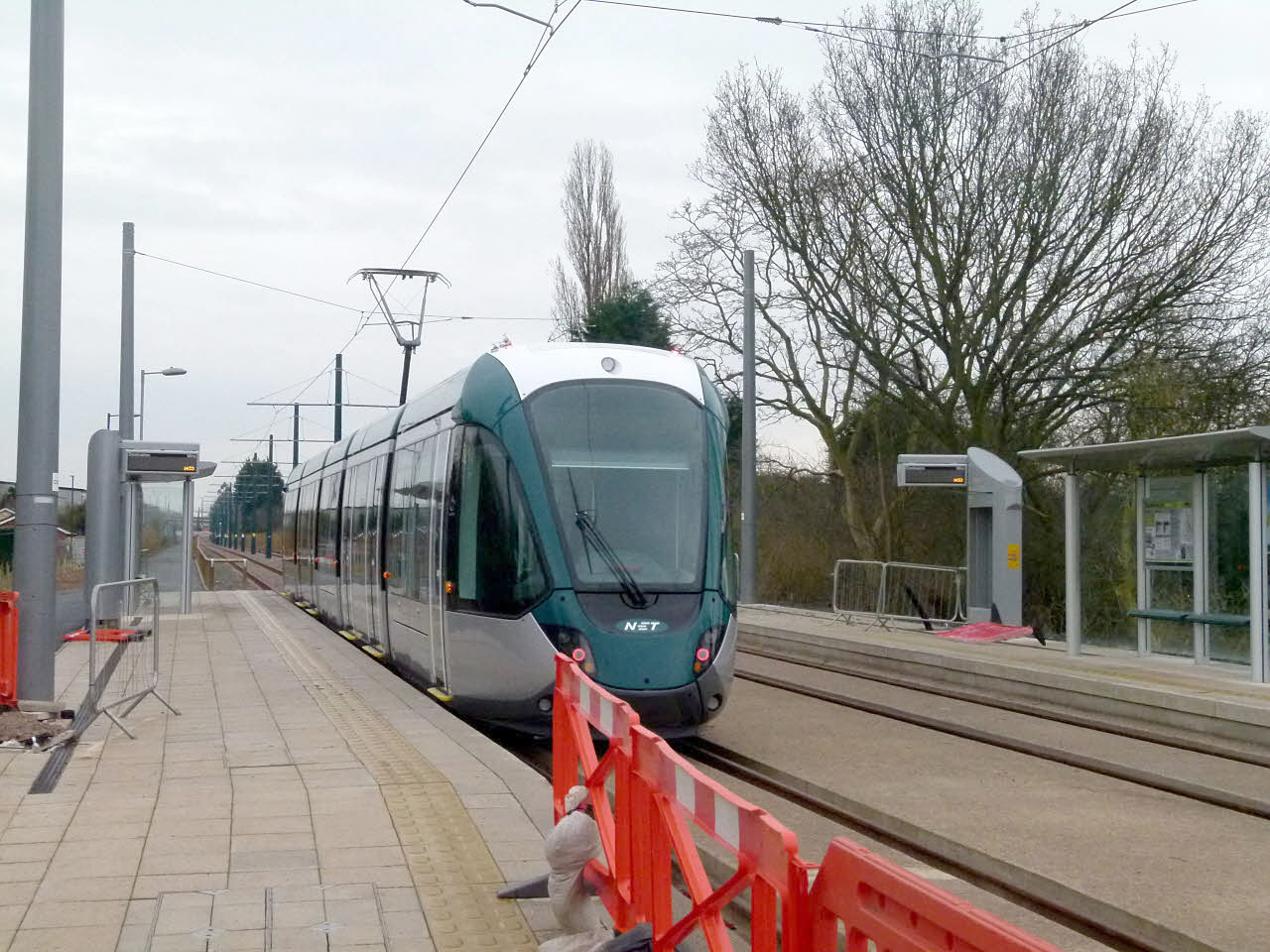

General information
- Location: Wilford, City of Nottingham; England
- Coordinates: 52°55′10″N 1°09′27″W
- System: Nottingham Express Transit tram stop
- Owner: Nottingham Express Transit
- Operator: Nottingham Express Transit
- Line: 2
- Platforms: 2
- Tracks: 2

Construction
- Structure type: At grade; on private right of way
- Accessible: Step-free access to platform

Key dates
- 25 August 2015: Opened

Services
Preceding station	NET	Following station
Wilford Lane towards Phoenix Park	Line 2	Ruddington Lane towards Clifton South
Location
- Location within Nottinghamshire

Compton Acres is a tram stop on the Nottingham Express Transit (NET) network. The stop lies on the boundary between the city of Nottingham and the Rushcliffe. The stop is on line 2 of the NET, from Phoenix Park via the city centre to Clifton, and trams run at frequencies that vary between 4 and 8 trams per hour, depending on the day and time of day.

The tram line and stop is located on the course of the former Great Central main line, which once linked London with Nottingham and Sheffield, but which closed in 1969. The stop is on reserved track and comprises a pair of side platforms flanking the tracks. It is accessed by footpath from each side of the line.

Compton Acres opened on 25 August 2015, along with the rest of NET's phase two.
