= Ruddington Lane tram stop =

Ruddington Lane
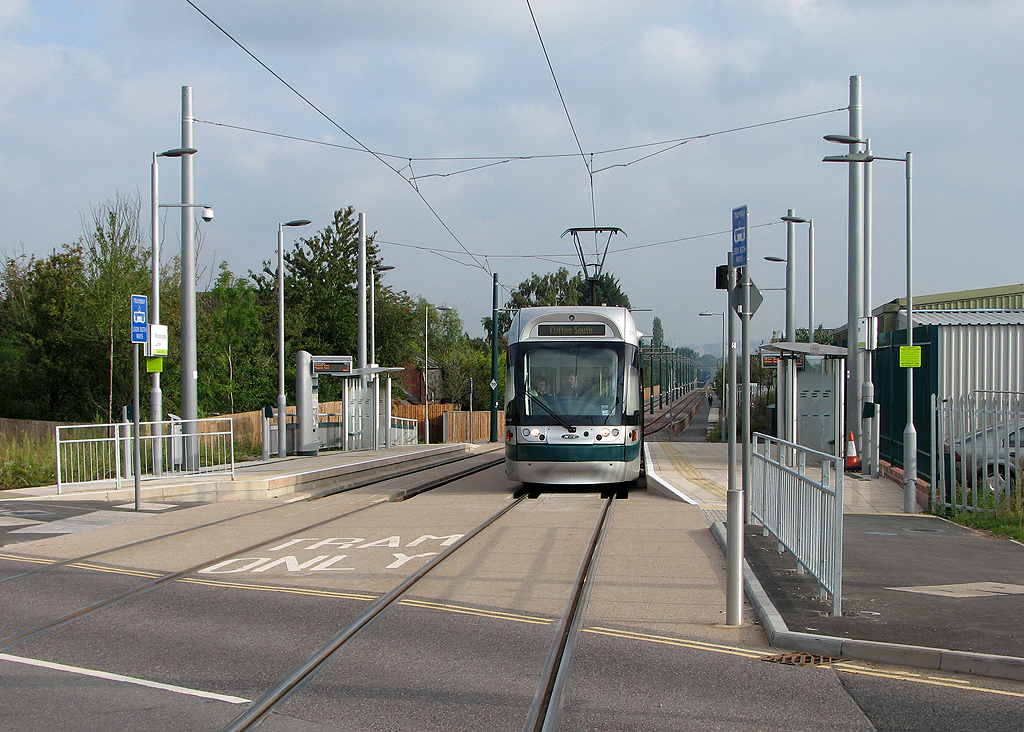

General information
- Location: Wilford, City of Nottingham; England
- Coordinates: 52°54′53″N 1°09′30″W
- System: Nottingham Express Transit tram stop
- Owner: Nottingham Express Transit
- Operator: Nottingham Express Transit
- Line: 2
- Platforms: 2
- Tracks: 2

Construction
- Structure type: At grade; on private right of way
- Accessible: Step-free access to platform

History
- Opened: 25 August 2015; 10 years ago

Services
| Preceding station | NET | Following station |
|---|---|---|
| Compton Acres towards Phoenix Park | Line 2 | Southchurch Drive North towards Clifton South |
Location
- Location within Nottinghamshire

Ruddington Lane is a tram stop on the Nottingham Express Transit (NET) network. The stop takes its name from Ruddington Lane, which is crossed on the level just south of the stop, and lies on the boundary between the city of Nottingham and the district of Rushcliffe. The stop is on line 2 of the NET, from Phoenix Park via the city centre to Clifton, and trams run at frequencies that vary between 4 and 8 trams per hour, depending on the day and time of day.

The tram line and stop is located on the course of the former Great Central main line, which once linked London with Nottingham and Sheffield, but which closed in 1969. The railway line here ran in a cutting and crossed under Ruddington Lane. As part of the development of the tramway, the tram track was raised and Ruddington Lane lowered, so as to allow a traffic light controlled level crossing. To the south of this crossing, the tram line passes under Clifton Boulevard (A52) using a pre-existing bridge, before leaving the former railway right of way and running on a new alignment across country towards the Clifton Estate. The stop is on reserved track and comprises a pair of side platforms flanking the tracks.

Ruddington Lane opened on 25 August 2015, along with the rest of NET's phase two.

== Gallery ==
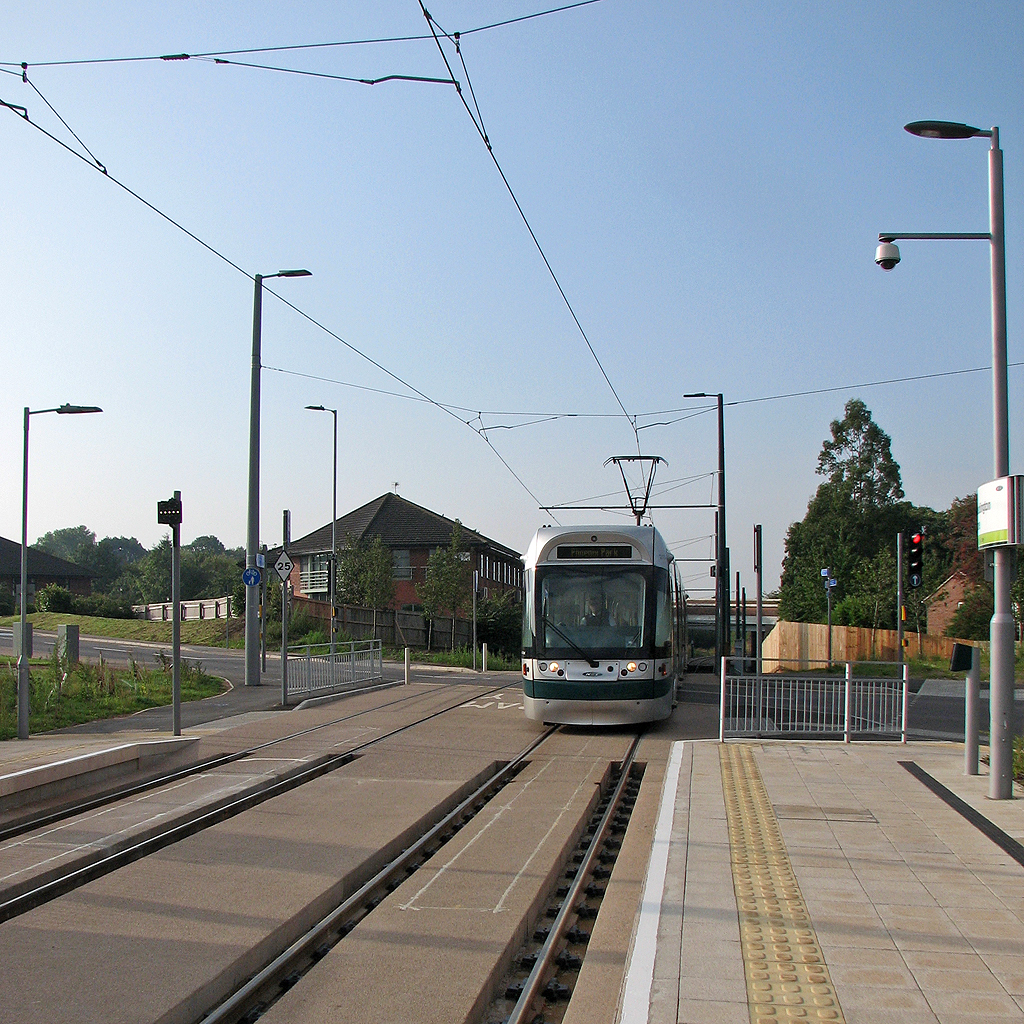
The stop looking south, with the crossing of Ruddington Lane

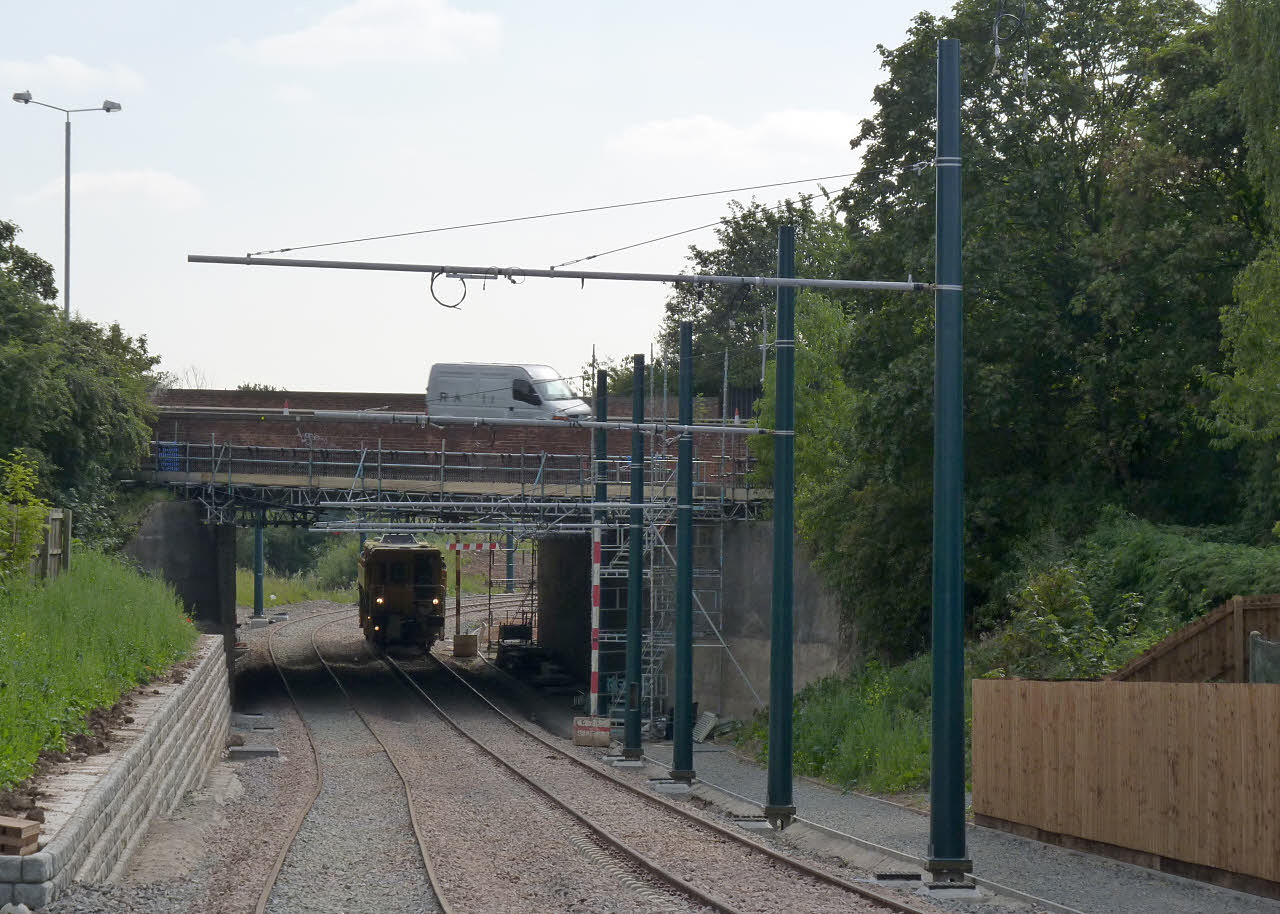
Looking further south during the tracklaying phase, with the line passing under the A52
