= Colin Slater =

English sports commentator (1934–2022)

Colin Stuart Slater MBE (28 February 1934 – 10 January 2022) was an English sports commentator for BBC Radio Nottingham.

== Early life and career ==
Slater was born in Bradford, England on 28 February 1934. He started his career as a journalist at local newspapers in Bradford. He later progressed to reporting and commentating on football matches at Notts County in 1959, initially writing match reports for "The Football News" and "The Football Post" before joining Radio Nottingham in 1968. He covered over 2000 matches featuring Notts County for Radio Nottingham, a milestone reached on 17 November 2007 when Notts played Macclesfield Town. During the 1970s, Slater also handled media relations for Nottinghamshire County Council, seeing it through the reorganisation of 1973/74 when the county took over some of the powers of Nottingham city Council.

On 24 April 2017, Slater announced that he was to retire from commentary duties for BBC Radio Nottingham although he would remain as the station's Notts County correspondent.

== Honours ==
Slater was appointed Member of the Order of the British Empire (MBE) in the 2001 Birthday Honours "for services to the community in Nottingham", in recognition of his contribution to radio, his work with the Football Association, and his role as the Deputy Chairman of the Nottingham Bench of Magistrates (NBoM). In August 2015, Slater had a Nottingham tram named after him. On 15 November 2017, Slater was named as an Honorary Vice-President of Notts County Football Club, in recognition of his many years of dedication to the club. He received honorary degrees from both Nottingham Trent University (2014) and the University of Nottingham (2018).

== Personal life and death ==
Slater represented the Diocese of Southwell and Nottingham on the General Synod of the Church of England.

He died on 10 January 2022, at the age of 87.
