= Rivergreen tram stop =

Rivergreen
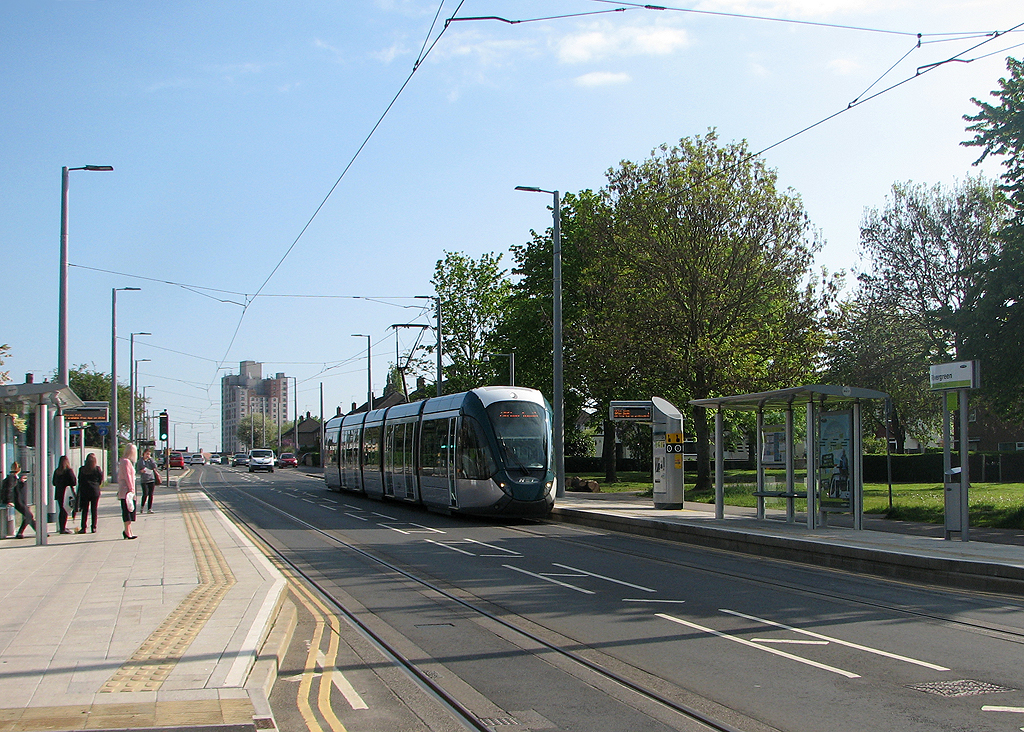

General information
- Location: Clifton, City of Nottingham; England
- Coordinates: 52°54′25″N 1°10′30″W
- System: Nottingham Express Transit tram stop
- Owner: Nottingham Express Transit
- Operator: Nottingham Express Transit
- Line: 2
- Platforms: 2
- Tracks: 2

Construction
- Structure type: At grade; on street
- Accessible: Step-free access to platform

Key dates
- 25 August 2015: Opened

Services
Preceding station	NET	Following station
Southchurch Drive North towards Phoenix Park	Line 2	Clifton Centre towards Clifton South
Location
- Location within Nottinghamshire

Rivergreen is a tram stop on the Nottingham Express Transit (NET) network in the city of Nottingham suburb of Clifton. It is situated on street track on Southchurch Drive near its junction with Rivergreen, and comprises a pair of side platforms flanking the running tracks. The stop is on line 2 of the NET, from Clifton via the city centre to Phoenix Park. Trams run at frequencies that vary between 4 and 8 trams per hour, depending on the day and time of day.

Rivergreen stop opened on 25 August 2015, along with the rest of NET's phase two.
