= Summerwood Lane tram stop =

Nottingham Express Transit tram stop

Summerwood Lane
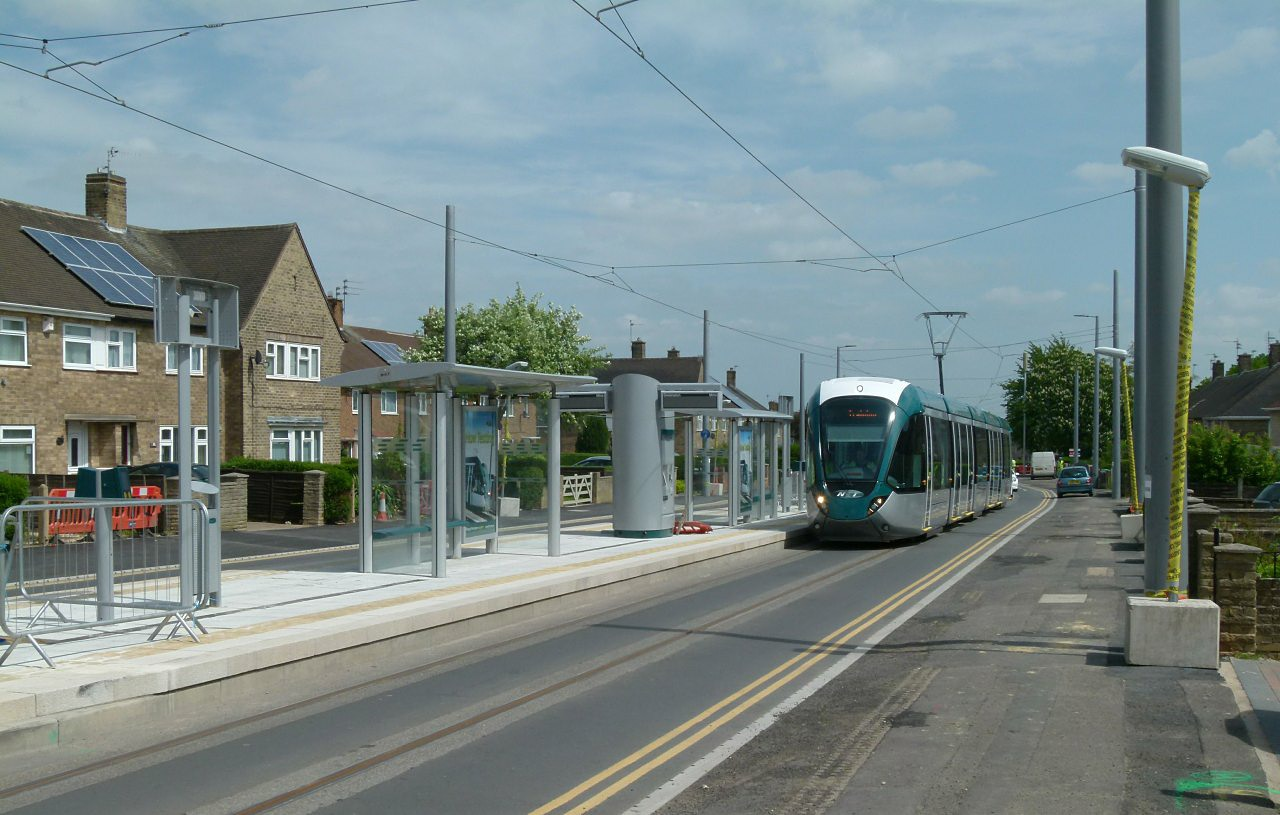

General information
- Location: Clifton, City of Nottingham; England
- Coordinates: 52°53′49″N 1°11′17″W
- System: Nottingham Express Transit tram stop
- Owner: Nottingham Express Transit
- Operator: Nottingham Express Transit
- Line: 2
- Platforms: 2 (island)
- Tracks: 2

Construction
- Structure type: At grade; on street
- Accessible: Step-free access to platform

Key dates
- 25 August 2015: Opened

Services
Preceding station	NET	Following station
Holy Trinity towards Phoenix Park	Line 2	Clifton South Terminus
Location
- Location within Nottinghamshire

Summerwood Lane is a tram stop on the Nottingham Express Transit (NET) network in the city of Nottingham suburb of Clifton. It is situated on street track within Farnborough Road close to its junction with Summerwood Lane, and comprises a single island platform situated between the tracks. The stop is on line 2 of the NET, from Clifton via the city centre to Phoenix Park. Trams run at frequencies that vary between 4 and 8 trams per hour, depending on the day and time of day.

Summerwood Lane stop opened on 25 August 2015, along with the rest of NET's phase two.
