= Holy Trinity tram stop =

Tram stop in Nottingham, England

Holy Trinity
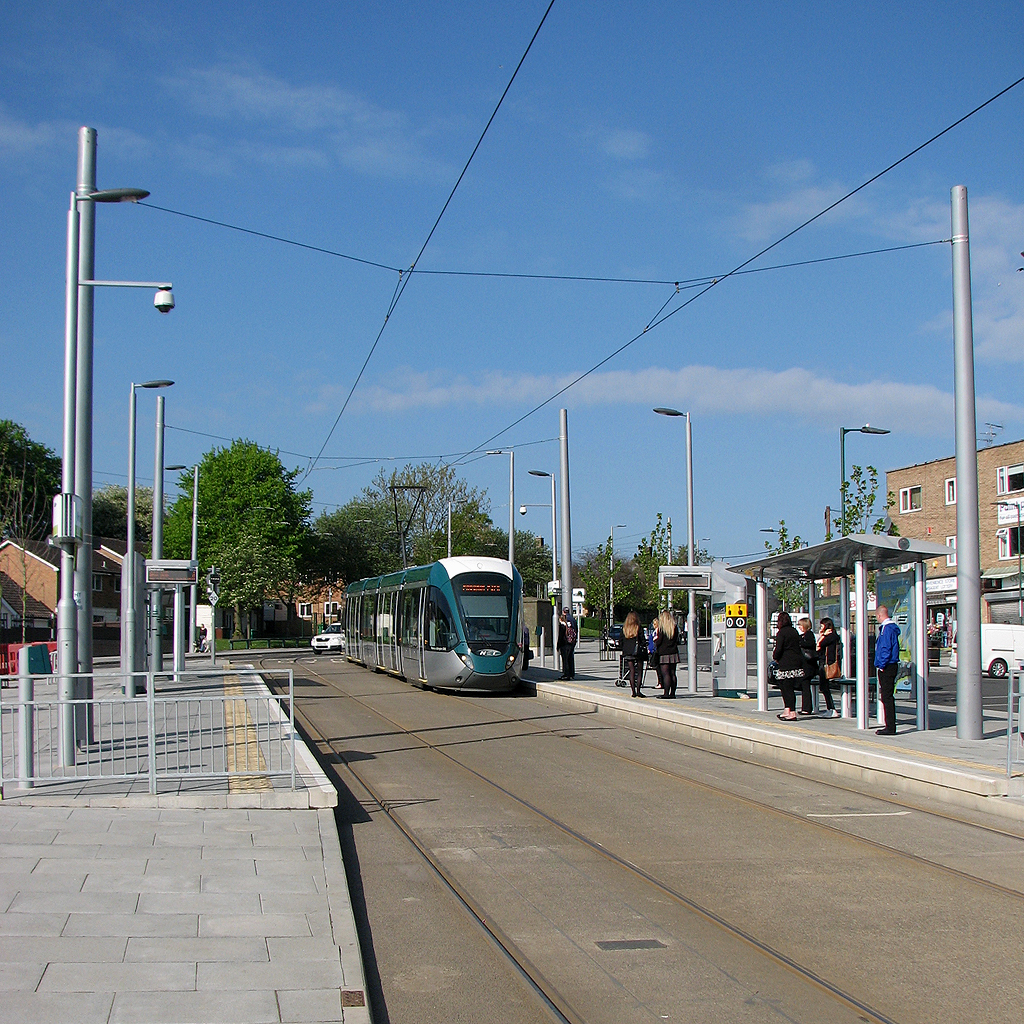

General information
- Location: Clifton, City of Nottingham; England
- Coordinates: 52°53′49″N 1°10′53″W
- System: Nottingham Express Transit tram stop
- Owner: Nottingham Express Transit
- Operator: Nottingham Express Transit
- Line: 2
- Platforms: 2
- Tracks: 2

Construction
- Structure type: At grade; reserved track
- Accessible: Step-free access to platform

Key dates
- 25 August 2015: Opened

Services
Preceding station	NET	Following station
Clifton Centre towards Phoenix Park	Line 2	Summerwood Lane towards Clifton South
Location
- Location within Nottinghamshire

Holy Trinity is a tram stop on the Nottingham Express Transit (NET) network in the City of Nottingham suburb of Clifton. It takes its name from the nearby Holy Trinity Church. It is situated on a short stretch of reserved track at the junction of Southchurch Drive and Farnborough Road, and comprises a pair of side platforms flanking the running tracks. The stop is on line 2 of the NET, from Clifton via the city centre to Phoenix Park. Trams run at frequencies that vary between 4 and 8 trams per hour, depending on the day and time of day.

Holy Trinity stop opened on 25 August 2015, along with the rest of NET's phase two.
