= Clifton Centre tram stop =

Tram stop in Nottinghamshire, England

Clifton Centre
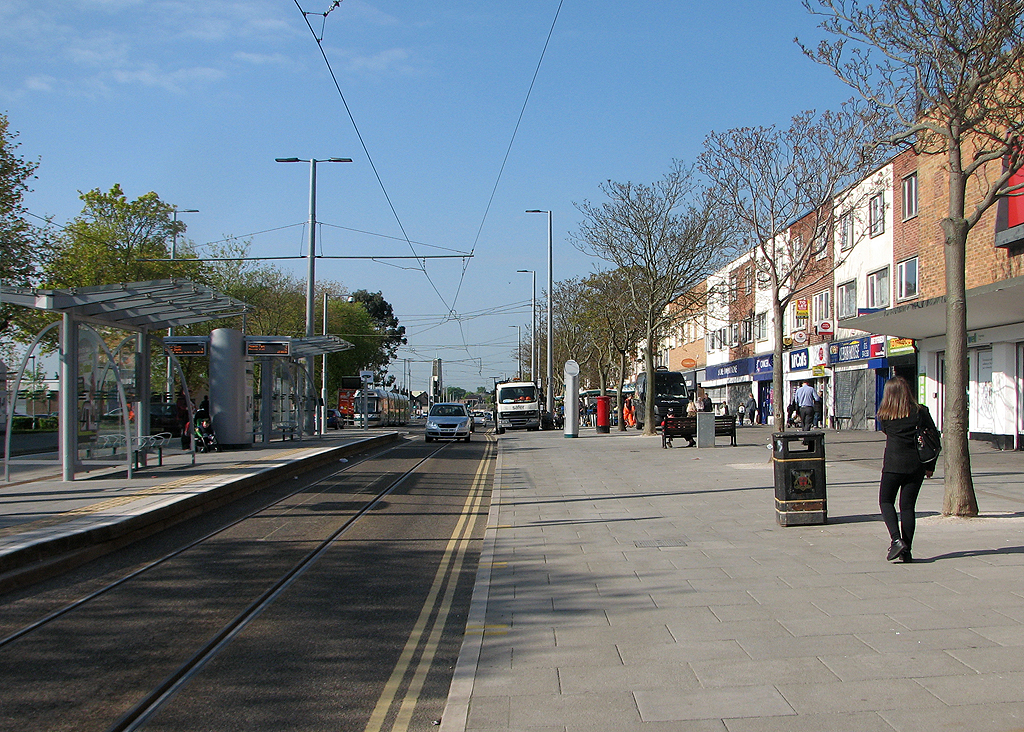

General information
- Location: Clifton, City of Nottingham; England
- Coordinates: 52°54′14″N 1°10′37″W
- System: Nottingham Express Transit tram stop
- Owner: Nottingham Express Transit
- Operator: Nottingham Express Transit
- Line: 2
- Platforms: 2 (island)
- Tracks: 2

Construction
- Structure type: At grade; on street
- Accessible: Step-free access to platform

Key dates
- 25 August 2015: Opened

Services
Preceding station	NET	Following station
Rivergreen towards Phoenix Park	Line 2	Holy Trinity towards Clifton South
Location
- Location within Nottinghamshire

Clifton Centre is a tram stop on the Nottingham Express Transit (NET) network in the city of Nottingham suburb of Clifton. It is situated on street track within Southchurch Drive, and comprises a single island platform situated between the running tracks. The stop is on line 2 of the NET, from Clifton via the city centre to Phoenix Park. Trams run at frequencies that vary between 4 and 8 trams per hour, depending on the day and time of day. To the south of the stop, a reversing siding is located between the running tracks, allowing trams from the city centre to terminate at Clifton Centre and stand clear of through services.

Clifton Centre stop opened on 25 August 2015, along with the rest of NET's phase two.

== Gallery ==
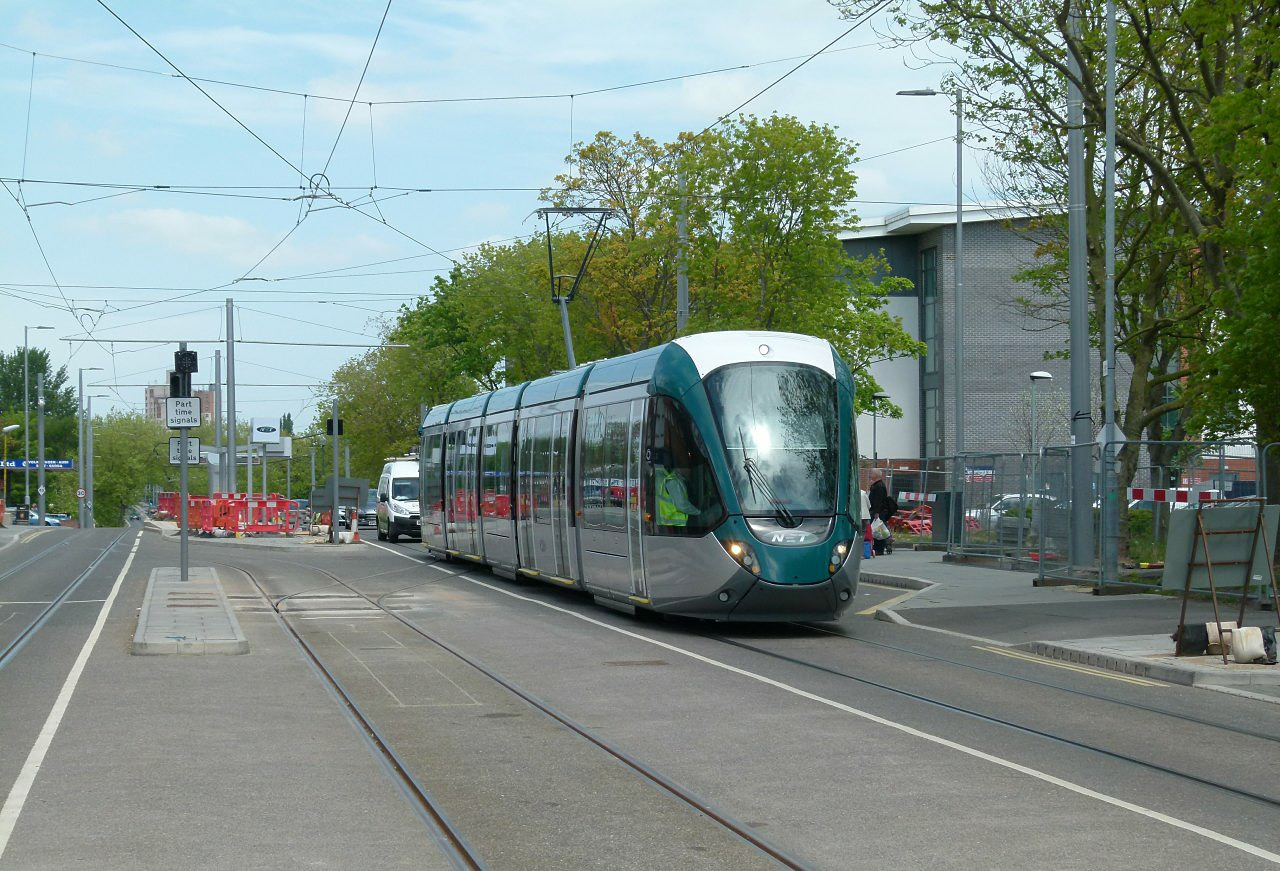
The reversing siding between the running tracks; platform under construction behind

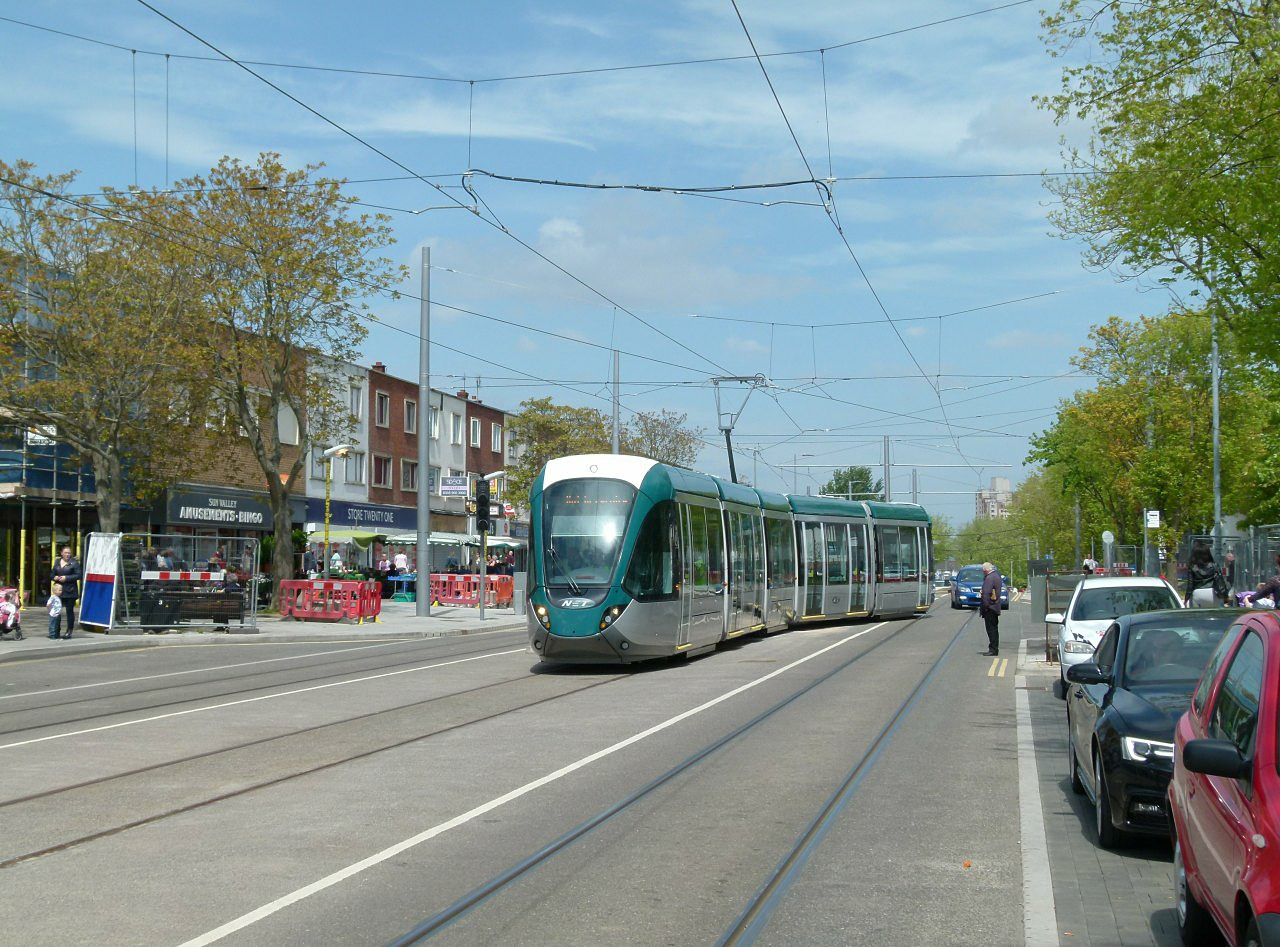
Tram entering the reversing siding; the stop is hidden by the tram

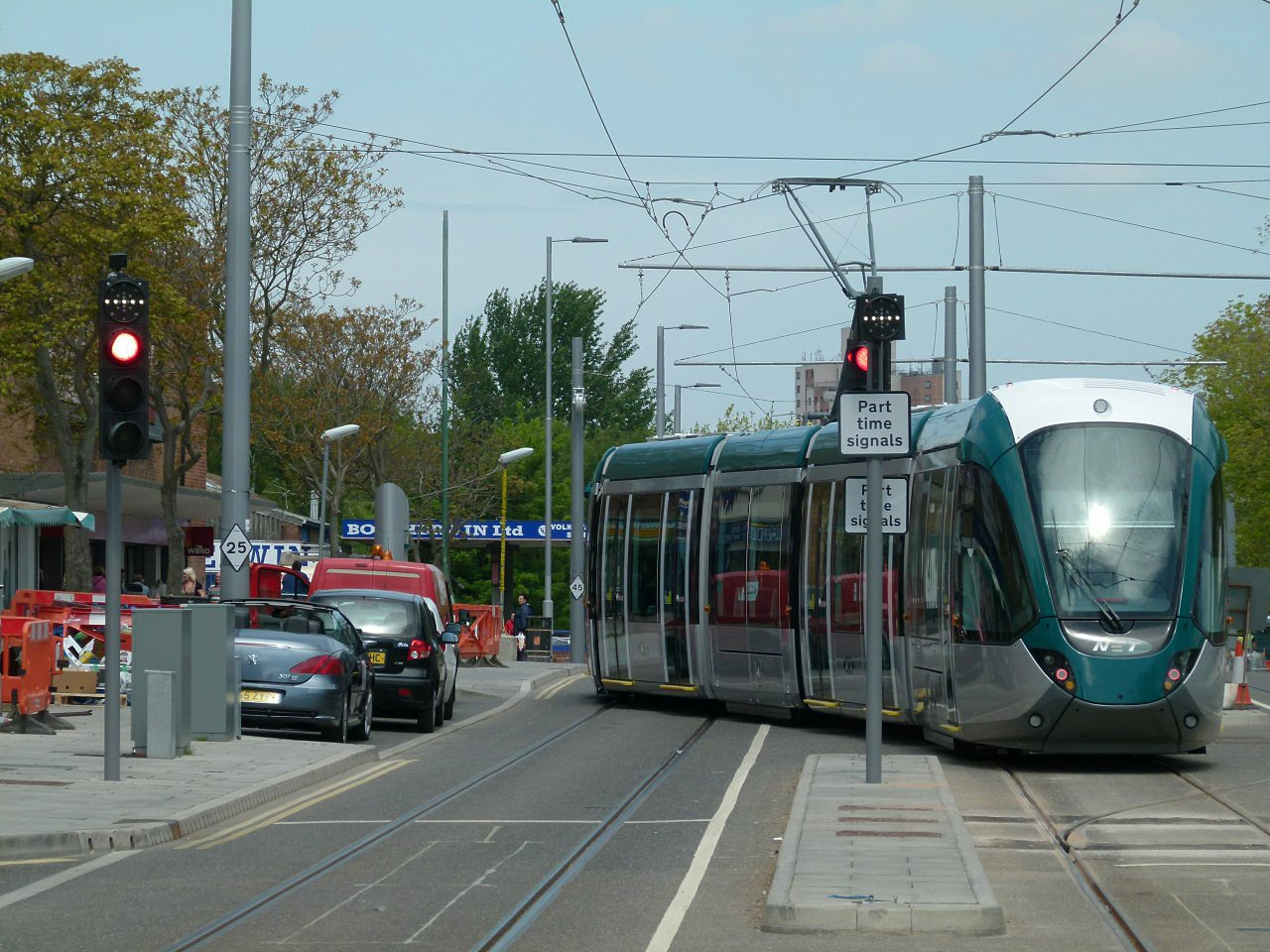
Tram exiting the reversing siding; the stop is hidden by the tram
