= Clifton, Nottingham =

Coordinates: 52.904°N 1.177°W

Clifton
- Urban village and district
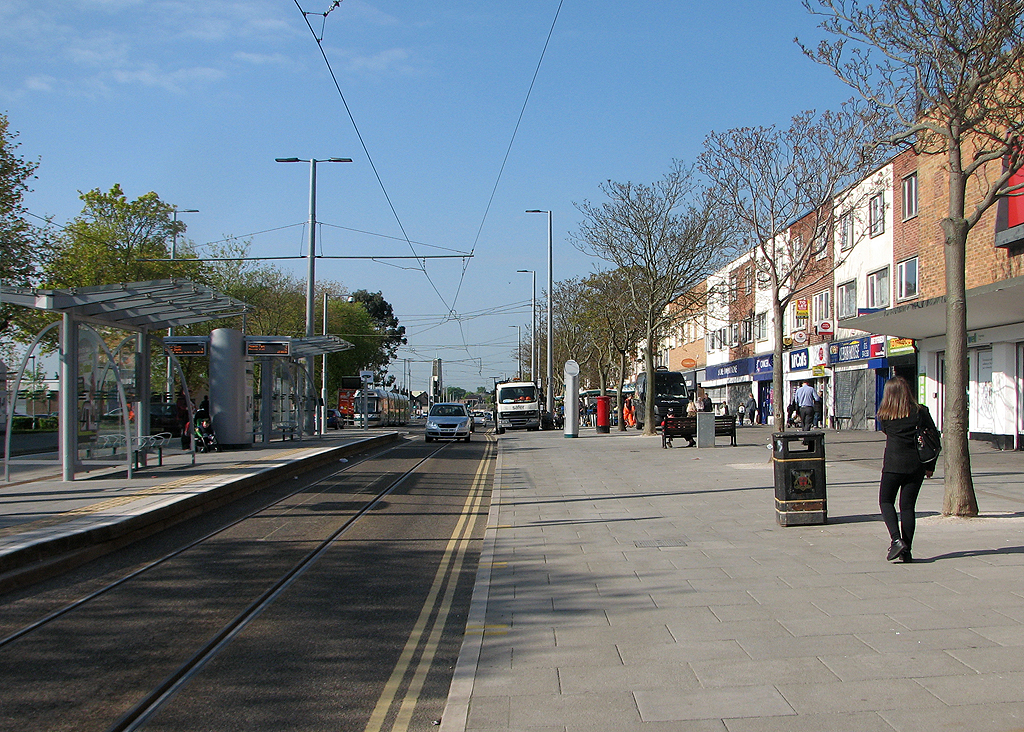
- Clifton Centre

- Location within Nottinghamshire
- Area: 5.95 km^{2} (2.30 sq mi)
- Population: 22,936 (2021 Census)
  - Density: 3,855/km^{2} (9,980/sq mi)
- OS grid reference: SK5534834415
- Unitary authority: Nottingham
- Ceremonial county: Nottinghamshire
- Region: East Midlands
- Country: England
- Sovereign state: United Kingdom
- Post town: NOTTINGHAM
- Postcode district: NG11
- Dialling code: 0115
- Police: Nottinghamshire
- Fire: Nottinghamshire
- Ambulance: East Midlands
- UK Parliament: Nottingham South

Clifton is an urban area and historic manor in the Nottingham district, in the ceremonial county of Nottinghamshire, England. As of the 2021 census, it had a population of 22,936.

Clifton has two council wards in the City of Nottingham (Clifton West and Clifton East as of 2018) with a total population taken at the 2011 census (prior wards of Clifton North and Clifton South) of 26,835. The location also encompasses Clifton Grove and Clifton Village, a residential area set alongside the River Trent.

The Manor of Clifton was for many centuries the seat of the de Clifton (later Clifton) family, branches of which were in the 17th century created Baron Clifton of Leighton Bromswold (1608) and Clifton baronets (1611). It is now the site of a council estate. The village is also notable for many old buildings including Clifton Hall, which is the former seat of the Clifton family, and St. Mary's Church.

Clifton is also home to the Nottingham Trent University Clifton Campus.

== History ==
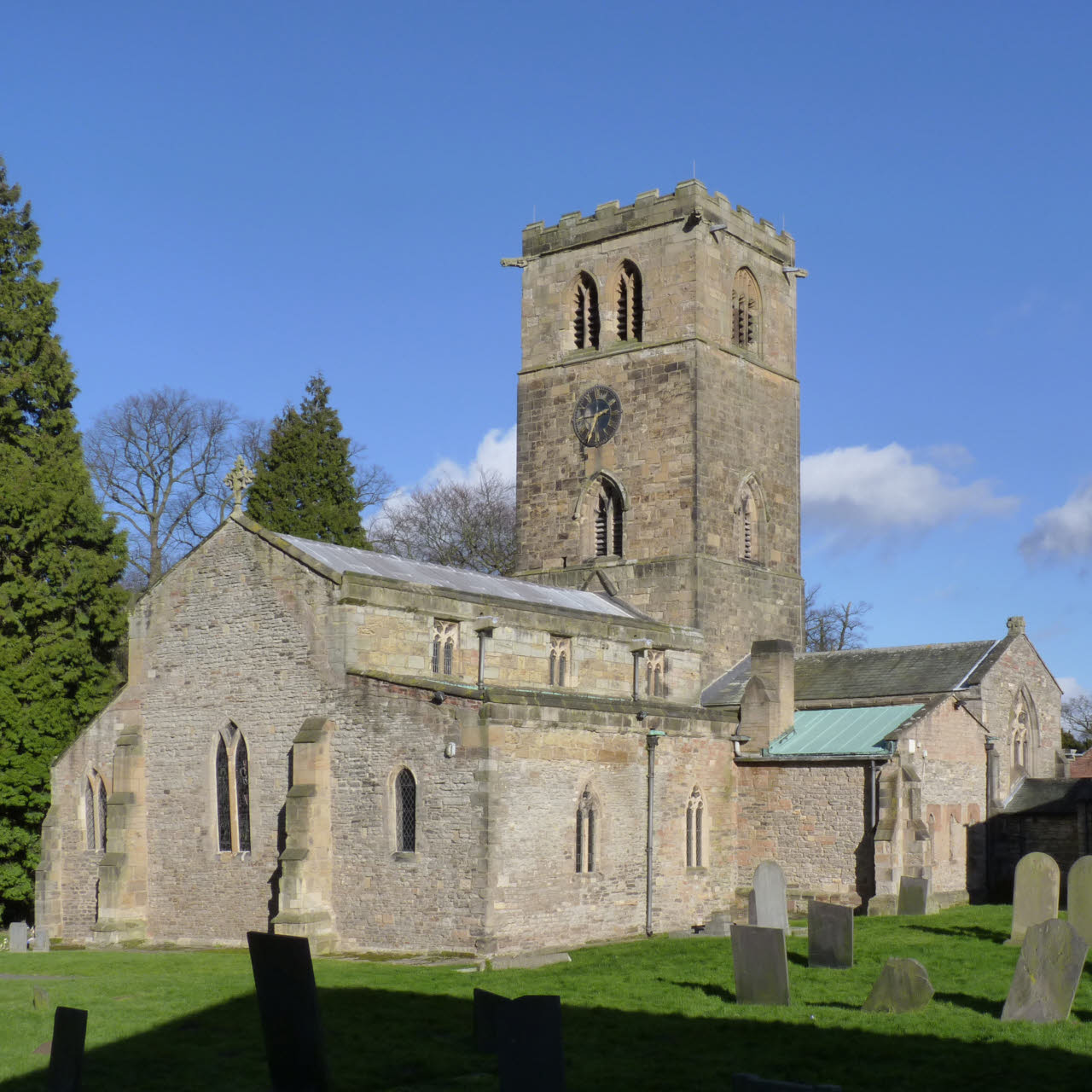
St Mary's Church, Clifton, grade I listed parish church of Clifton

The manor of Clifton was recorded in the Domesday Book of 1086 as having a church and a mill. The value of the manor had decreased since the Norman Conquest of 1066 from £16 to £9. For 700 years the Clifton family of Clifton owned the manor, of which their manor house was Clifton Hall. The papers of the Clifton family and their lands are held at Manuscripts and Special Collections, The University of Nottingham.

Prior to Clifton being subsumed into the city, the area was previously within a civil parish called Clifton with Glapton until 1952, Glapton being a small scattering of houses and farms prior to when the estate was built, and was in the area approximately where present day Glapton Lane is, there still being some older houses that predate the estate along the lane.

== Modern Clifton ==
The council estate has a number of shop-clusters and relatively good transport links (by tram and bus) with the city (~20 minutes) and surrounding areas. The village is on the A453 road which is the main connection between Nottingham and the M1 motorway south. The section of the A453 from Kegworth to the roundabout next to the Crusader pub has been upgraded to a dual carriageway; this project was completed in 2016. A new retail park known as 'Clifton Triangle' was built on the site of derelict industrial buildings and was completed in 2018.

Directly next to Clifton on a large area of land, approximately 244 hectares (606 acres), to the southwest, a new settlement is currently under construction named Fairham. The other nearest settlements to Fairham are Gotham to the south, Ruddington to the east and Barton-in-Fabis to the west. There will also be land for commercial units with an industrial estate named Fairham Business Park. The outline planning permission to build Fairham was granted by Rushcliffe Borough Council in January 2018, and also includes improved infrastructure and transport links.

== Clifton Council Estate ==
The Clifton Council Estate is a sprawling conurbation, which was first enabled by the boundary changes to the city of Nottingham in 1951 by an Act of Parliament.

== Governance ==
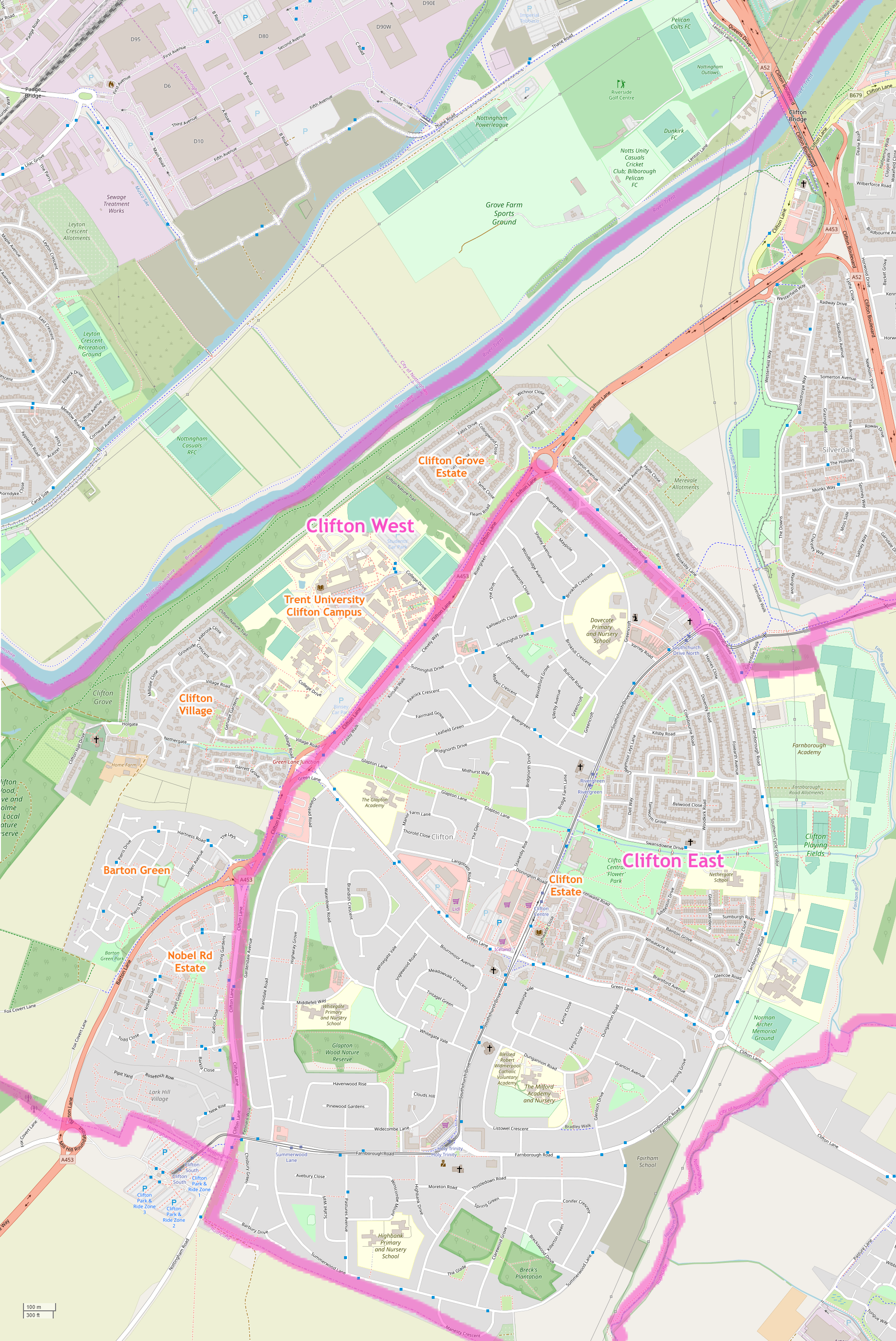
Map of Clifton, Nottingham, UK showing local government wards and neighbourhood areas.

Local government matters are administered by Nottingham City Council, a Labour-run unitary authority.

Clifton is split into two wards:

- Clifton East includes the rest of Clifton, effectively covering the vast majority of the original 1950s Clifton Council Estate. As of 2023, it is represented on Nottingham City Council by Councillors Kevin Clarke, Kirsty Jones and Maria Watson (all representing the area as Nottingham Independents).
- Clifton West includes Wilford, Silverdale, the Clifton Grove Estate, Clifton Village, Barton Green, Nobel Road Estate, Lark Hill Retirement Village and the Brooksby Lane and Sturgeon Avenue areas of the original 1950s Clifton Council Estate. As of 2023, it is represented by Councillors Andrew Rule (Independent) and Hayley Spain (Labour).

Parliamentary, Clifton falls within the Nottingham South constituency, with Lilian Greenwood (Labour) the current Member of Parliament.

== Education ==
Primary schools include The Milford Academy, Glapton, Whitegate, Highbank, Dovecote (an amalgamation of Greencroft, Brooksby and Brinkhill) and Blessed Robert Widmerpool (Catholic). Farnborough Spencer Academy on Farnborough Road is the mainstream secondary school for the area, while Nethergate School on Swansdowne Drive is an all-through special school. On Farnborough Road was also one of the Central College Nottingham campuses which is now redundant and being sold. The old Fairham School site is also redundant.

Nottingham Trent University has one of its major campuses situated on Clifton Lane (A453). This modernised campus offers teaching and learning facilities and also accommodation, a sports village & sports facilities, cafés, and shops all inside a self-contained community. The campus was developed and upgraded with an investment of over £20 million and offers courses with a focus on disciplines such as engineering, healthcare and sport.

On what is now wasteland, accessible from Brooksby Lane or Silverdale Walk, remain the foundations of the original Brooksby School, which was burnt down in the early 1980s. Brooksby school was then moved to the location now known as Dovecote School taking a building originally a part of Greencroft School.

== Sport and recreation ==
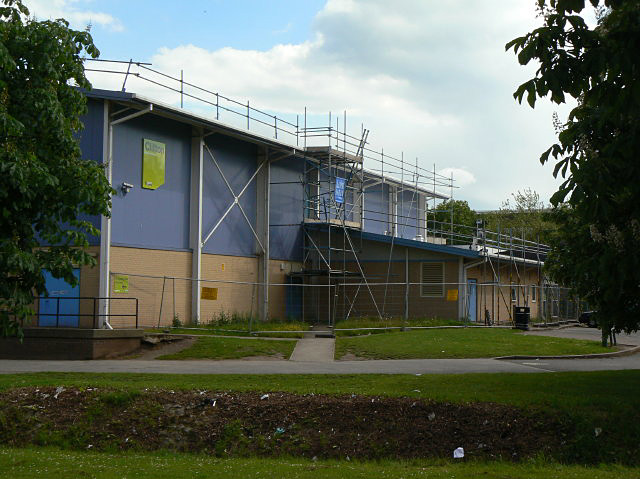
Clifton Leisure Centre in Central Park, Southchurch Drive, Nottingham, while being refurbished, May 2009.

Clifton has seven football teams: Clifton All Whites, Clifton Aces, Clifton Blacks, Clifton Wanderers, Clifton FC, FC Olympico And Clifton Mad Squad (CMS).

Most notable football players from Clifton are Viv Anderson, Jermaine Jenas and Darren Huckerby.

Clifton Leisure Centre is located on Southchurch Drive in the central area of Clifton. The leisure centre is a modernised leisure facility which offers a wide range of activities for all ages and abilities. The facilities at the leisure centre include a Health Suite, a 25m Swimming Pool, Teaching Pool, Gym, Group Cycling Studio, Fitness Studio, various Multi-use Sports Halls and also a Children's Play Area. Through the recent developments and investments in the Nottingham Tram infrastructure there are now tram stops located adjacent to the facility and also various NCT bus services which have bus stops located on Southchurch Drive. KickboxUK, a division of the Professional Kickboxing Association set up PKA Kickboxing - Clifton in 2001 which serves as the headquarters for KickboxUK and has several Kickboxing classes broken down into various age groups that take place in Clifton Leisure Centre every week on Thursday, there are 4 different classes which run, Reception 4-5 years, Cadets 6-9 years, Juniors 10-13 years, and finally an Adults Class for ages 14+.

A weekly parkrun 5 km (3.1 mi) event has been held on Clifton Playing Fields since 2018.

== Transport ==
=== Tram service ===
Clifton is the terminus of line 2 of the Nottingham Express Transit tramway, which opened in August 2015. The line runs from a terminus at a park and ride site just to the west of Clifton, through Clifton, Wilford, and Nottingham City Centre, before continuing to Phoenix Park in the north of the city. Trams run at frequencies that vary between 4 and 8 trams per hour, depending on the day and time of day. The following stops are in, or near to, Clifton:

- Southchurch Drive
- Rivergreen
- Clifton Centre
- Holy Trinity
- Summerwood Lane
- Clifton South

=== Bus services ===
Bus services in Clifton, Nottingham
Bus operator	Line	Destination(s)	Notes
Nottingham City Transport	1	Nottingham → Railway Station → Trent Bridge → Wilford Lane → NTU Clifton Campus → Clifton → Gotham → East Leake → Loughborough	
Nottingham City Transport	1A	Nottingham → Railway Station → Trent Bridge → Wilford Lane → NTU Clifton Campus → Clifton	
Nottingham City Transport	1E	Nottingham → Railway Station → Trent Bridge → Wilford Lane → NTU Clifton Campus → Clifton → Gotham → East Leake	
Nottingham City Transport	4	NTU City Campus → Nottingham → Railway Station → Trent Bridge → Wilford Lane → NTU Clifton Campus	Line serves during NTU term only.
Nottingham City Transport	9	Nottingham → Railway Station → West Bridgeford → Compton Acres → Ruddington → Clifton (Farnborough Road, Southchurch Drive, Crusader Roundabout)	
Nottingham City Transport	48	Nottingham → Railway Station → Meadows → Electric Avenue → Clifton Bridge → Clifton (Southchurch Drive, Nobel Road)	
Nottingham City Transport	48A	Nottingham → Railway Station → Meadows → Queen's Drive → Clifton Bridge → Clifton (Southchurch Drive, Nobel Road)	
Nottingham City Transport	53	Arnold → Daybrook → City Hospital → Basford → Western Boulevard → Jubilee Campus → QMC → Showcase Cinemas → Clifton	
Nottingham City Transport	53B	Clifton → Showcase Cinema → QMC	
Nottingham City Transport	54	Arnold → Daybrook → City Hospital → Basford → Western Boulevard → Jubilee Campus → QMC → Showcase Cinemas → Clifton	
Nottingham City Transport	54B	Clifton → Showcase Cinema → QMC	
	55	Arnold → Daybrook → City Hospital → Basford → Western Boulevard → Jubilee Campus → QMC → Showcase Cinemas → Silverdale → Clifton	
	55A	Silverdale → Clifton	
Trentbarton	Skylink Express	Nottingham → Clifton → East Midlands Airport	
University Hopperbus	901	Nottingham (Weekends) → University Park → Showcase Cinemas → Clifton Lane → Sutton Bonington	

== Notable people ==
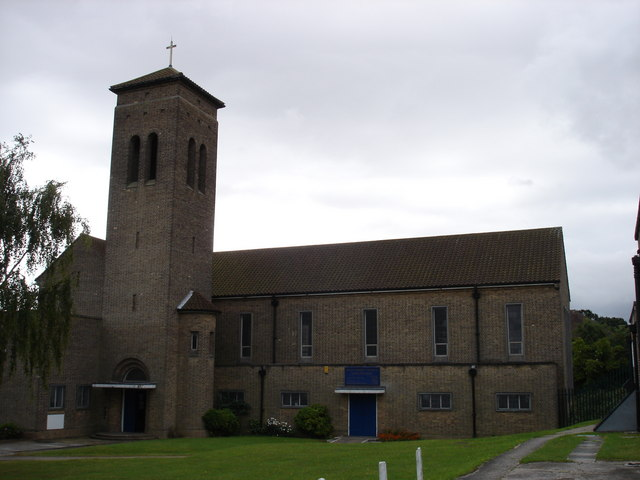
Holy Trinity Church, Clifton (Anglican). The church name of Holy Trinity Church, Trinity Square, Nottingham, was preserved with the new Holy Trinity Church, opened in 1958 in Clifton

- Jake Bugg, musician
- Brendan Clarke-Smith, politician
- Karl Collins, actor
- Samantha Morton, actress
- Jayne Torvill, ice skater, Olympic gold medallist
- Viv Anderson, footballer
- Darren Huckerby, footballer
- Jermaine Jenas, footballer
- Graham Dury, comic creator

== See also ==
- Listed buildings in Nottingham (Clifton South ward)
- Listed buildings in Nottingham (Clifton North ward)
