= Nantes Busway =

French bus rapid transit

Busway

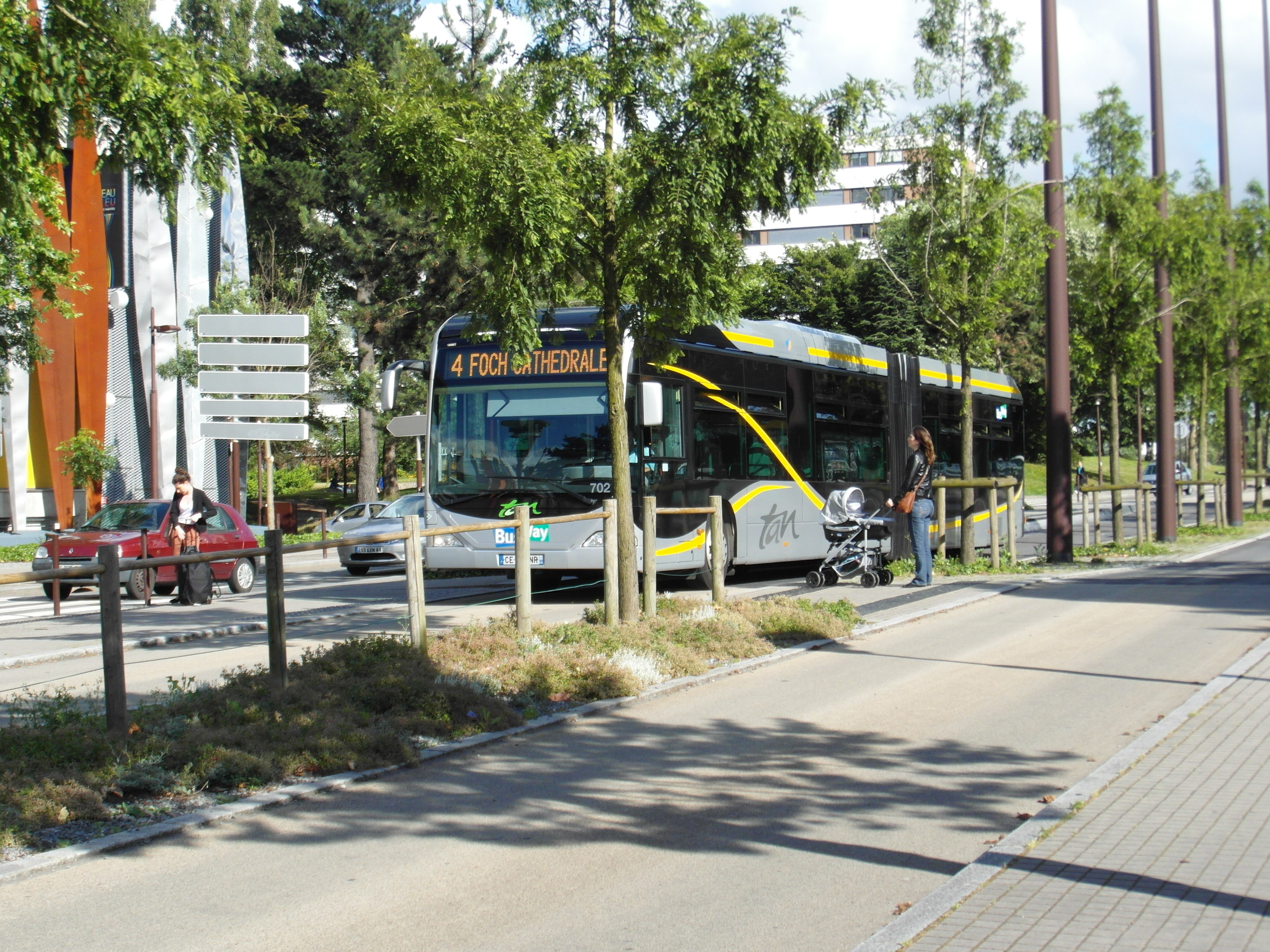

Overview
- Locale: Nantes, Pays de la Loire
- Transit type: Bus rapid transit
- Number of lines: 2
- Number of stations: 15
- Daily ridership: 28.000/day, 7 million/year

Operation
- Began operation: 2006
- Operator: Semitan

Technical
- System length: 7 km
System map

The Nantes Busways (line 4 and 5) are bus rapid transit lines operating in the city of Nantes, France. The service was inaugurated on November 6, 2006, and is operated by Semitan. The line 4 runs from Place Foch to Porte de Vertou on a dedicated right-of-way, and interconnects with line 1 of the Nantes Tramway at Duchesse Anne Château station. Four park & ride facilities have been built along the construction of the line to encourage passengers to use public transport. Nantes Busway line 4 is NF certified (NF stands for French Norm). A victim of its own success, Busway line 4 attracts higher ridership than Semitan expected, pushing the system to saturation. Buses are overcrowded at peak times and nearly full off-peak. Semitan tested the Hess LighTram in November 2009 to eventually increase capacity of the system and relieve overcrowding at peak times. Though that solution wasn't implemented at that time, Semitan decided to increase passage frequencies to less than 3 minutes at peak times. If saturation recurs, Busway line 4 might be converted into a Tramway line in the future.

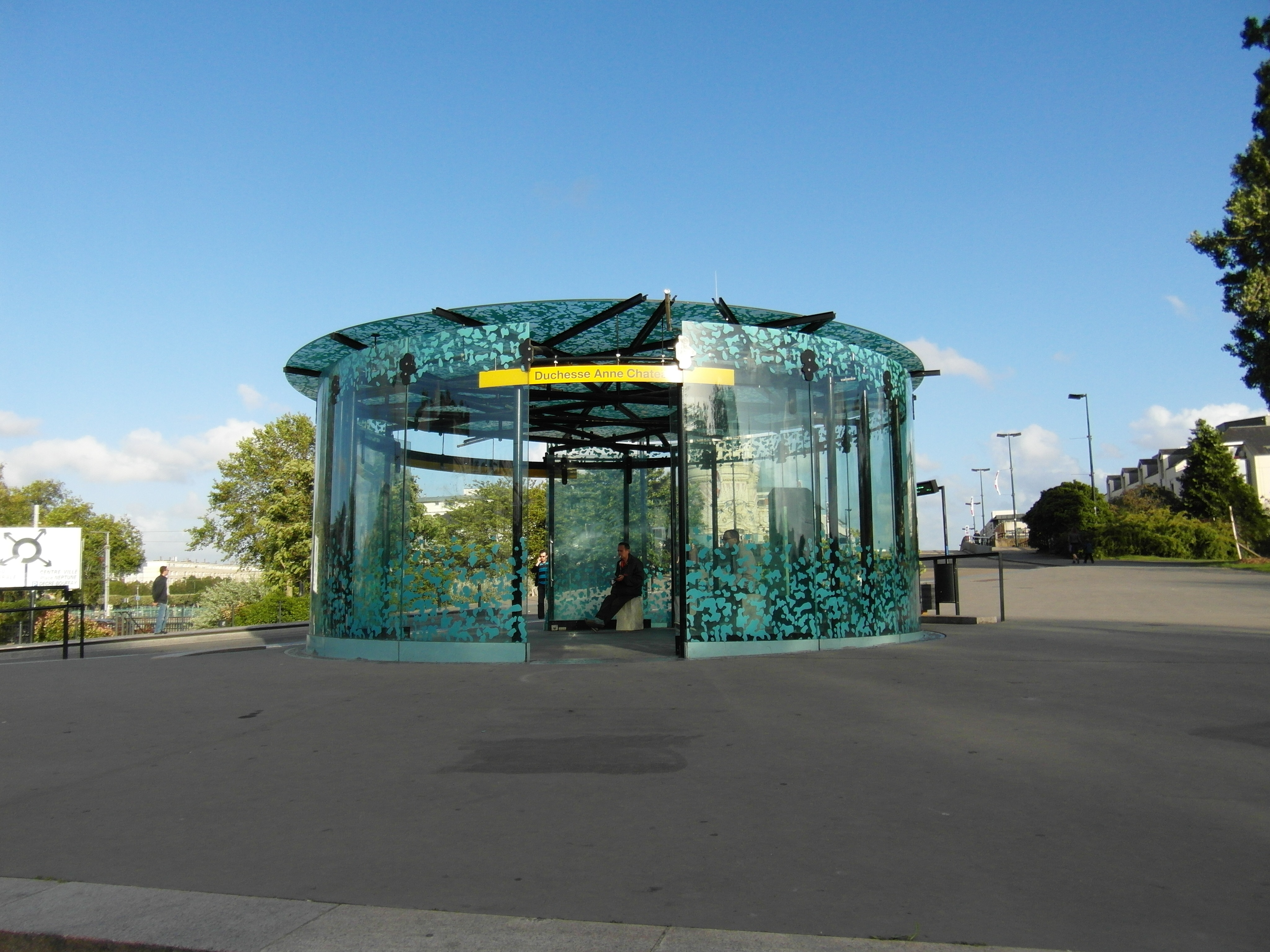
Circle shaped Duchesse Anne Château Station

Such saturation in Nantes would imply that a bottleneck such as the number of landing areas at a crowded busstation could not be opened up, because without any bottleneck peak buses, frequency per hour per direction for instance in BRT Belo Horizonte corridor Antônio Carlos was 500 in the year 2014 and 600 buses in BRT Rio corridor Presidente Vargas compared to 20 (in the year 2008) in Nantes. This meant brazilean headways of 7 and 6 seconds opposite to 180 in Nantes with in theory hugh space in case of French need for lower headways and increased bus frequency. Instead of the planned Tramway line Nantes preferred the e-bus HESS lighTram 25 TOSA combined with ultrafast charging (later HITACHI), which started operation in August 2019.

== UITP Award 2021 ==
In February 2022 the International Association of Public Transport (UITP) awarded the HESS e-bus system with HITACHI ultrafast charging in Nantes for "operational and technological excellence". The mayor of Nantes recalled that two million kilometers had been travelled with the new systems, what already helped to save 3,000 tonnes of CO_{2}.

== Operation ==
The network is operated by Semitan, known as TAN for short. Semitan is responsible for the whole public transport network throughout the Nantes Metropole (Greater Nantes), and the Metropole has a majority shareholding in the company.

=== Stations equipment ===
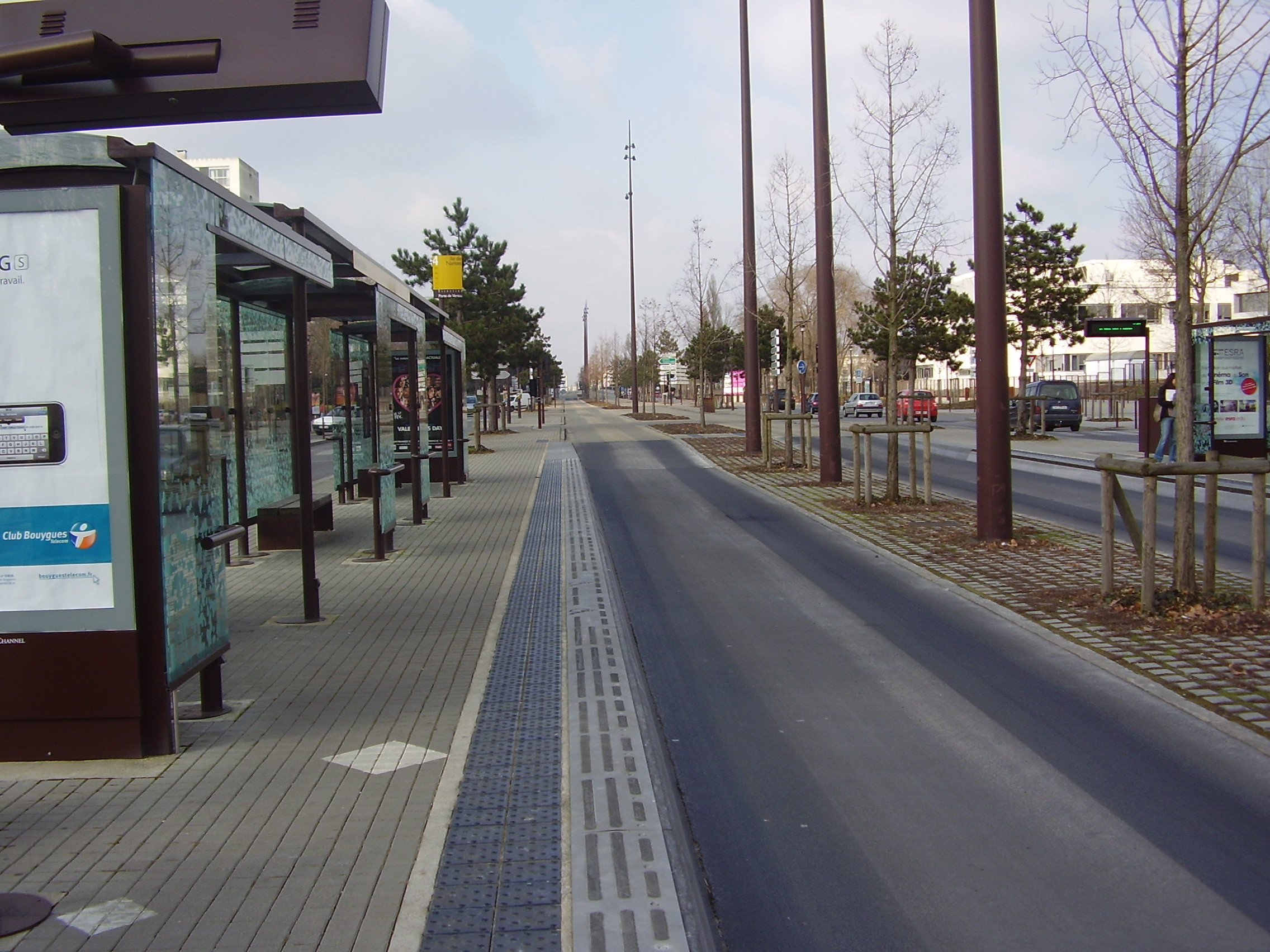
Ile De Nantes station

All stations are built with all the services that a Tramway station has. All have real time passenger information LED displays showing real time estimated arrival of the next bus, automatic ticket machines, seating and large unified shelters made of glass.

=== Hours of operation ===
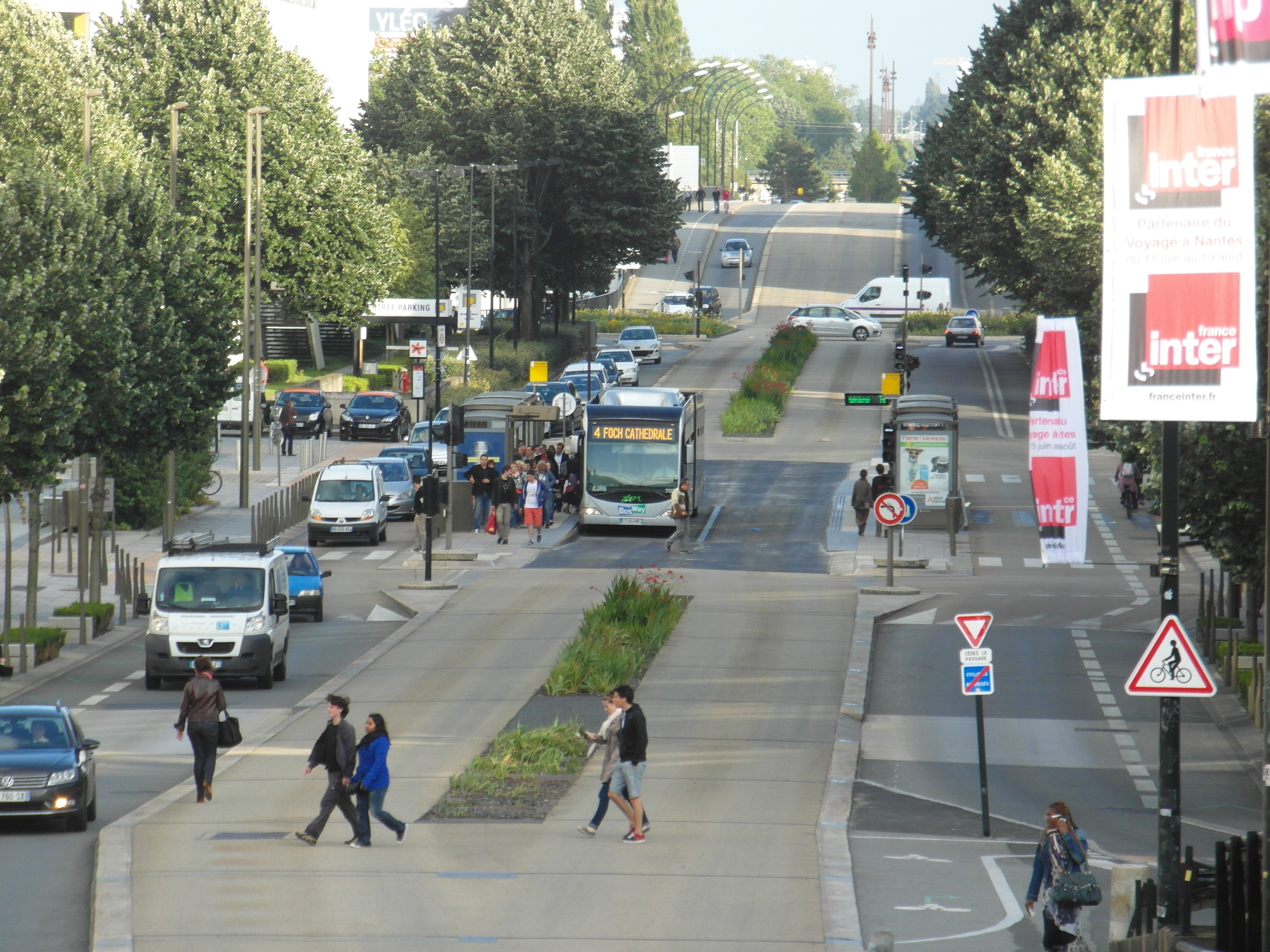
Station overview

Nantes' Busway does not run 24 hours a day. Service starts at 5am and goes until 0.30am on weekdays and Sundays, and from 5am to 2.30am on Saturdays. Delays are rare and service generally runs smoothly.

== Fares ==
The TAN network in Nantes uses paper tickets and passes, though in the near future contactless smartcards will replace it. There are no travel zones on the network in Greater Nantes. Tickets and passes allow free transfer and are universally valid on the Tramway, Busway, Nantes buses, Navibus, and suburban trains within Nantes Métropole. Tickets are not sold inside the trams, but ticket machines (which accept cash and credit cards) are present at every Tramway and Busway stations. Tickets must be validated inside the trams when boarding. There are also some staffed ticket offices opened for limited periods only.

=== Single trip and day tickets ===
Semitan issues singles trip tickets (Ticket 1 h) valid for one hour, a 10x saver ticket booklet (Carnet de 10 tickets 1h) valid one hour each, a discounted 10x saver ticket booklet (Carnet de 10 tickets 1h - Tarif réduit) valid one hour each, an airport transit ticket (Ticket navette aéroport), a 24 hours ticket (Ticket 24h) valid an entire day for one traveller and a 24 hours ticket valid an entire day for up to four persons (Ticket 24h/4 personnes).

Semitan also sells Lila and Métrocéane tickets.

Lila: Single trip tickets (Ticket unité Lila) valid two hours on the Lila network (departemental buses in Loire-Atlantique) and one hour on the TAN or STRAN (Saint-Nazaire buses) networks when transiting from Lila, a 10x saver ticket booklet (Carnet de 10 tickets Lila) valid two hours each on the Lila network and one hour on the TAN or STRAN networks when transiting from Lila.

=== Monthly and annual passes ===
Semitan issues a wide range of monthly and annual passes for different categories of travellers depending on their age and working conditions. Free transportation is granted to travellers with low incomes.

Semitan also sells monthly, termly and annual Lila, Métrocéane and Pratik+ passes, for several categories of persons depending on their age and working conditions.

== Fleet ==
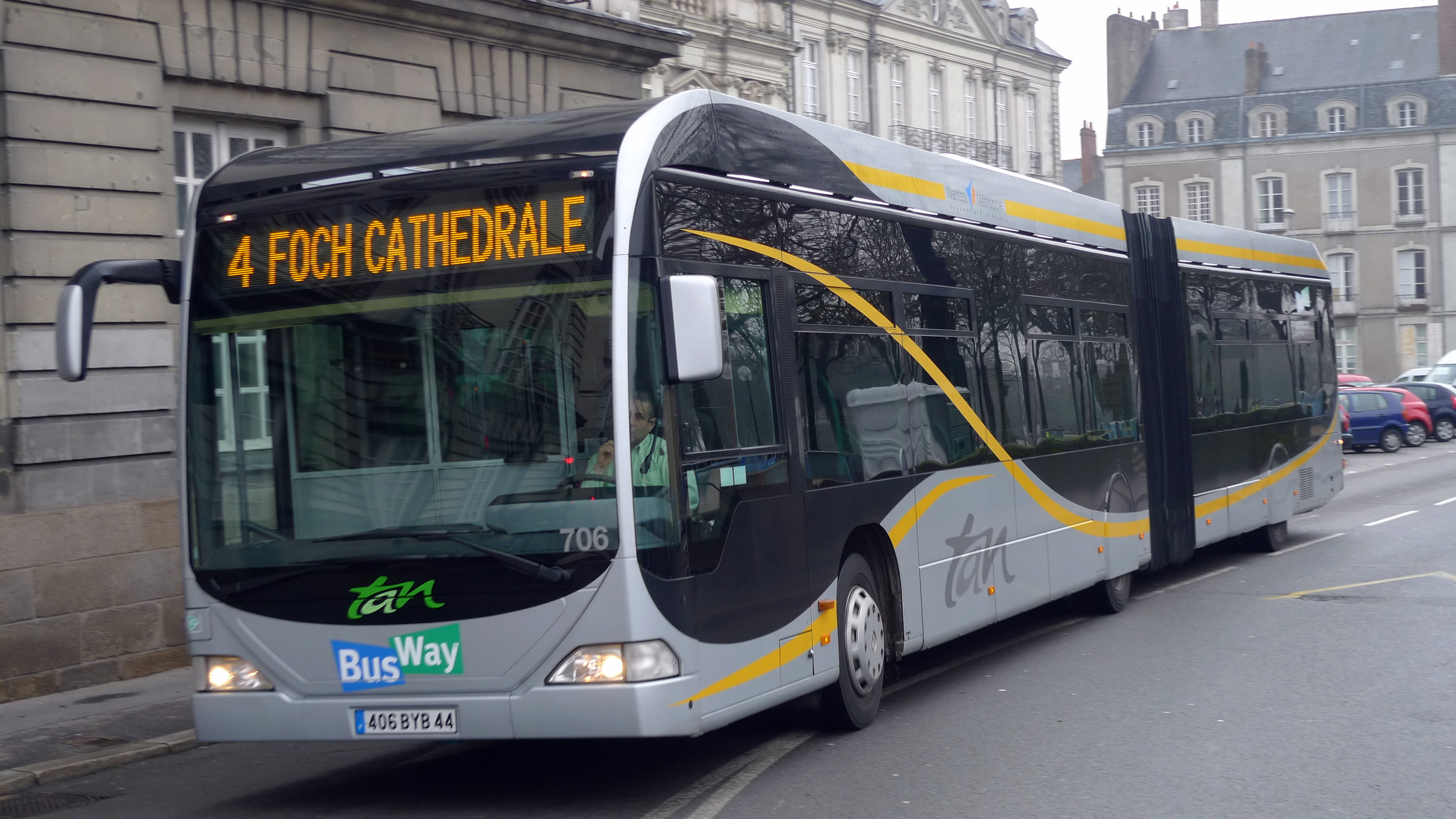
Citaro G bus approaching Place Foch

=== Citaro G ===
20 Mercedes-Benz Citaro G are running on Busway's line 4 on a dedicated right-of-way. Those articulated buses are 18 meters long, 2.55 meters wide and are natural gas powered only. The driver is isolated from the rest of the bus in a separate cabin. Each bus features:

- 4 sliding doors all with manual opening
- Double glazed windows
- Dynamic maps (LED display) showing stations
- Colored floor pattern, and wall colored LED lightning (additional to basic lightning)
- Four information flat screens showing connexions with buses and the Tramway
- Vocal station announcement
- Seats with better comfort than those found on conventional buses.

=== Rapid Charging of Hess Buses ===
600 kW flash charging at selected stations power new buses since 2019 of HESS lighTram 25 TOSA bi-articulated buses.

== See also ==
- Other busway systems
- Nantes Tramway
- Nantes Navibus
- 22 E-BUSWAY — 22 ARTISTES
- Semitan
