= Semitan =

French public transport company

- Company type: Private
- Industry: Public transport
- Founded: January 1979
- Headquarters: Hôpital Bellier, Nantes
- Key people: Albert Mahé; Alain Boeswillwald
- Revenue: €97,112,596
- Number of employees: 1,535
- Website: Tan.fr

Semitan is the company responsible for the comprehensive public transport network of Nantes Métropole, the urban community of the French city of Nantes. The network operated by Semitan is marketed under the name and logo TAN and this abbreviated form is also sometimes used to refer to the company. Semitan is itself an acronym for the Société d'Economie Mixte des Transports de l'Agglomération Nantaise. The TAN network comprises three Tramway lines, two Busway lines, an extensive network of buses, an airport shuttle bus line, two Navibus lines and a night bus network. A single common fare system covers all these modes and also extends to suburban trains within the Métropole boundaries, although these trains are not operated by Semitan.

Semitan is a mixed private and public sector company. As of 2007, its principal shareholders are Nantes Métropole (65%), the transport group Transdev (14.99%), banking group Caisse d'Epargne (10%) and the Chambre de commerce et d'industrie de Nantes (10%). It has been responsible through renewable 6 years "public service delegations", for the public transports of Nantes since it was formed in 1979, although the precise area covered has varied over the years.

== Organization ==
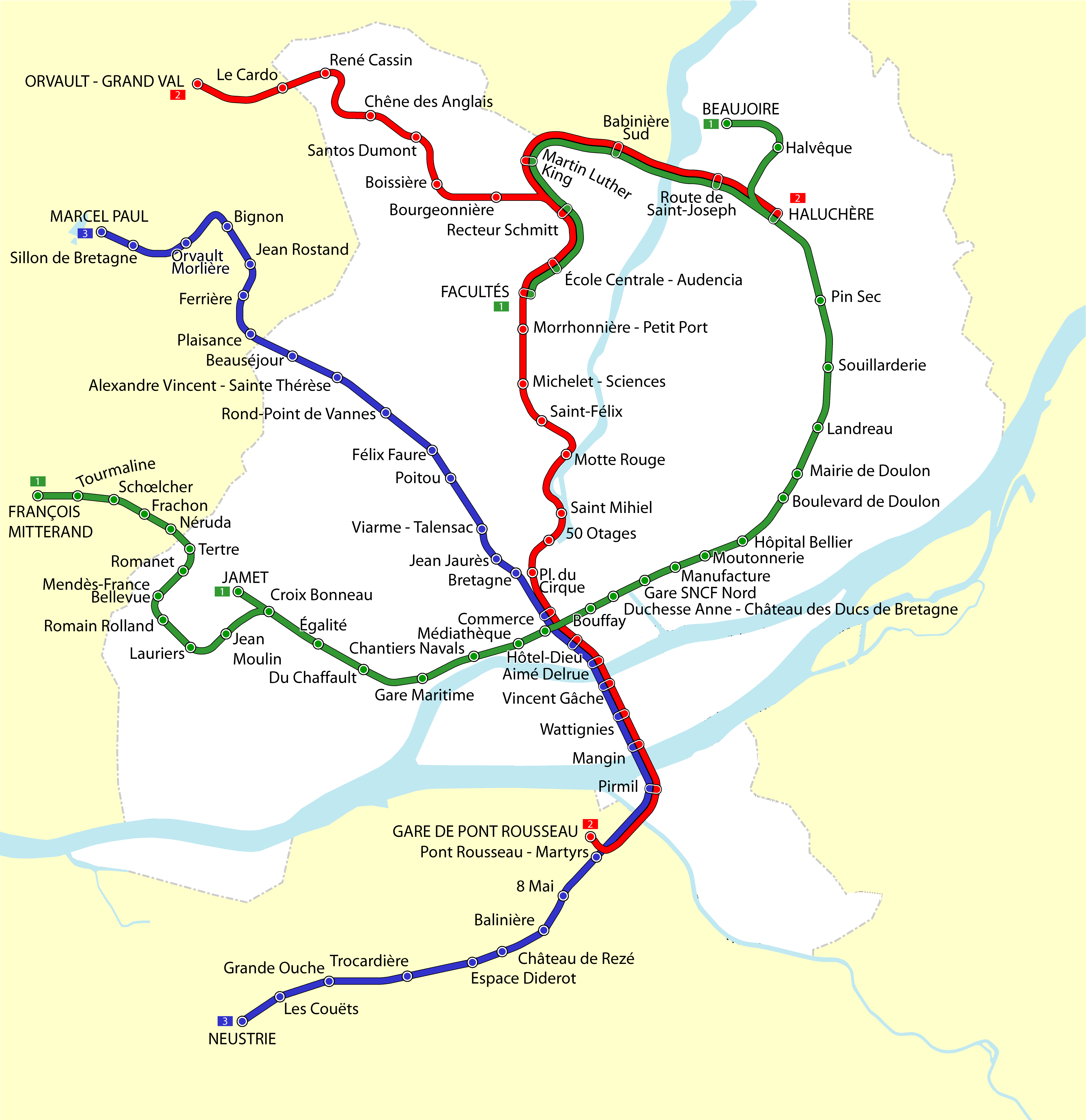
The Tramway network including the under construction connection between Line 1 and Line 2

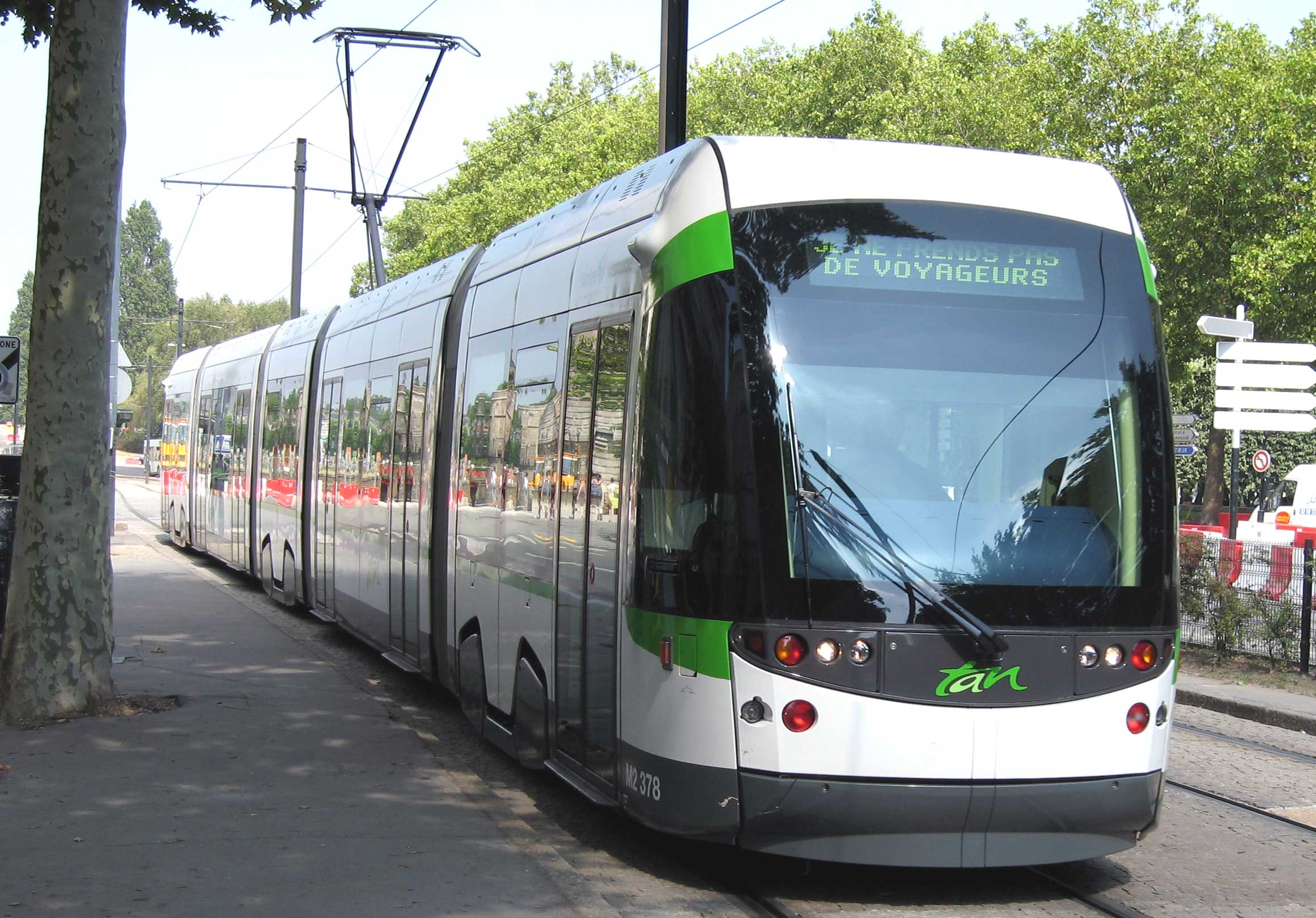
A Nantes tramcar close to Duchesse Anne - Château station

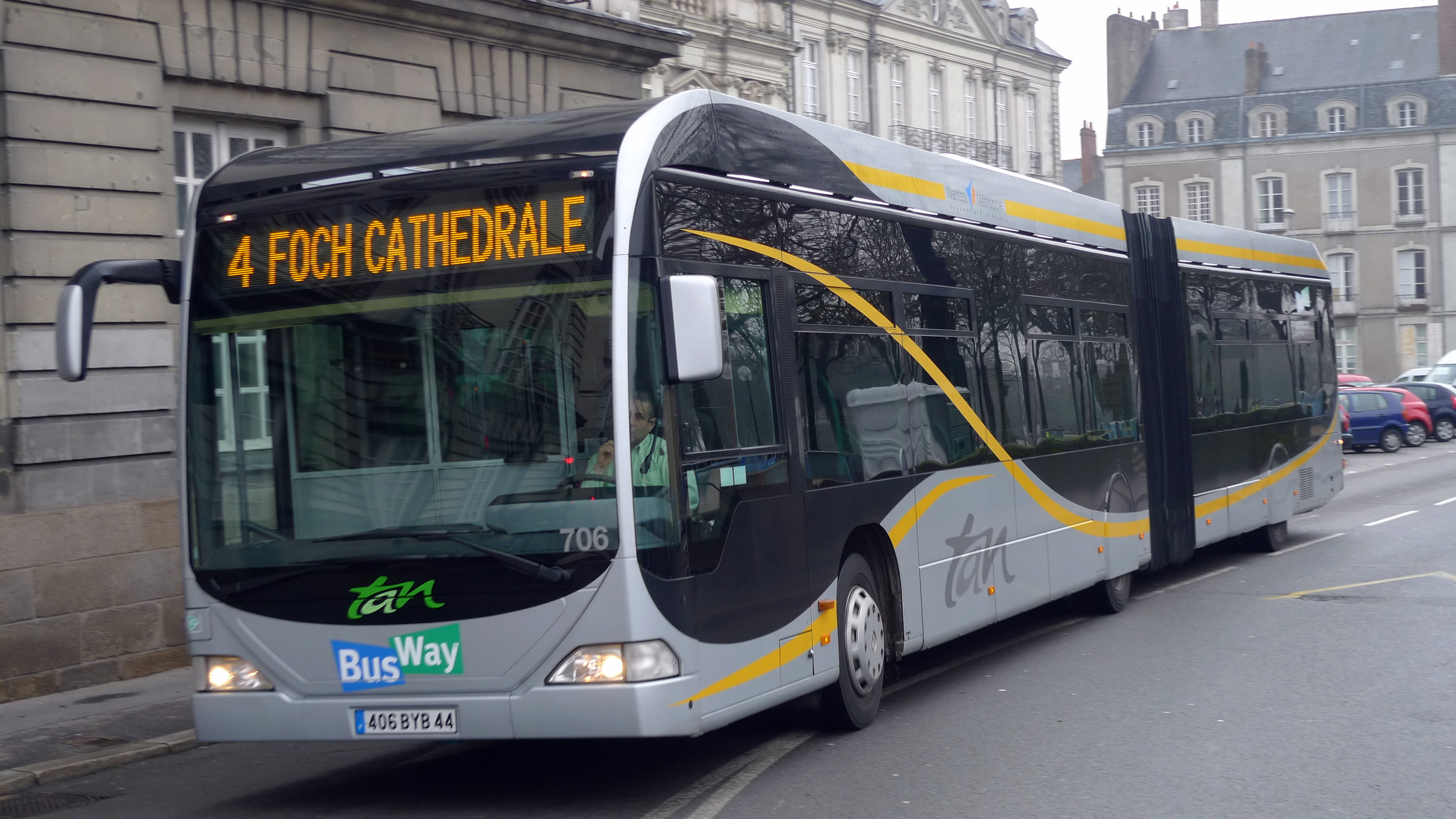
Nantes Busway

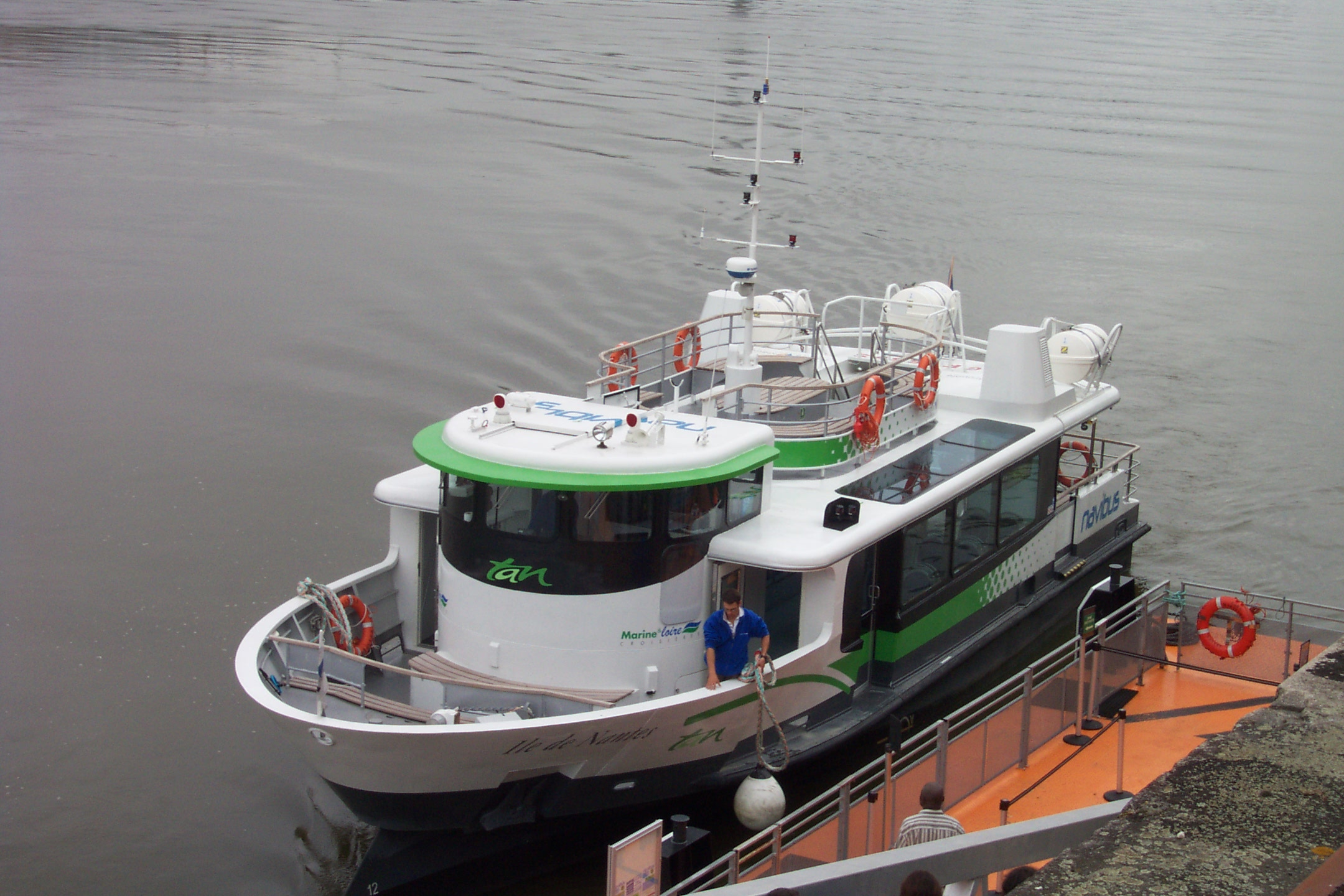
Nantes Navibus approaching Gare Maritime station

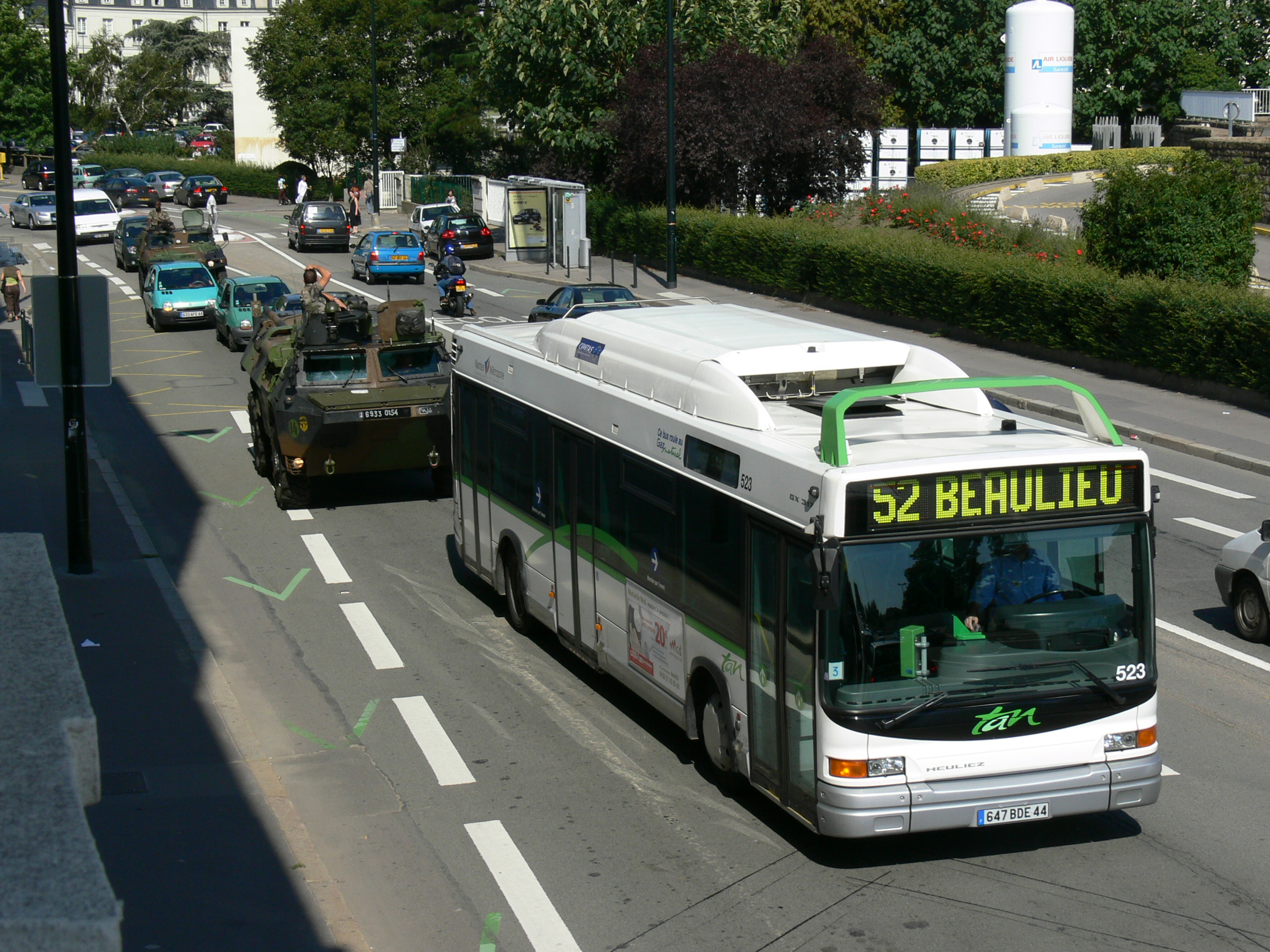
Typical Nantes bus

Currently, the TAN network comprises three Tramway lines, one Busway line, two Navibus lines, an extensive bus network that includes 56 lines and a night bus network. Additionally, Semitan has an exclusive agreement with French national train operator SNCF to allow TAN passengers to ride suburban trains within the urban area limits with a valid TAN ticket or pass.

TAN also operates "Navette Aéroport" (airport shuttle bus) between downtown Nantes and Nantes Atlantique Airport.

== Fares ==
The TAN network in Nantes uses paper tickets and passes along with contact less smart cards. There are no travel zones on the network in Greater Nantes. Tickets and passes allow free transfer and are universally valid on the Tramway, Busway, Nantes buses, Navibus, and suburban trains within Nantes Métropole. Ticket machines (which accept cash and credit cards) are present at every Tramway and Busway stations. There are also some staffed ticket offices open for limited periods only. Also, most newsagents sell some tickets and passes.

Like many public transport systems in Europe, TAN operates on a proof-of-payment system. The network is patrolled by fare inspectors equipped with handheld card readers. Passengers traveling without a valid ticket are straightaway asked about their identity and fined €46.50 (amounts may vary depending the nature of the infraction).

=== Single trip and day tickets ===
Semitan issues singles trip tickets (Ticket 1 h) valid for one hour, which costs €1.50 a 10x saver ticket booklet (Carnet de 10 tickets 1h)(costing €13.80) valid one hour each, a discounted 10x saver ticket booklet (Carnet de 10 tickets 1h - Tarif réduit) valid one hour each, an airport transit ticket (Ticket navette aéroport), a 24 hours ticket (Ticket 24h)(€4.4) valid an entire day for one traveller and a 24 hours ticket valid an entire day for up to four persons (Ticket 24h/4 personnes).

Semitan also sells Lila and Métrocéane tickets.

Lila: Single trip tickets (Ticket unité Lila) valid two hours on the Lila network (departemental buses in Loire-Atlantique) and one hour on the TAN or STRAN (Saint-Nazaire buses) networks when transiting from Lila, a 10x saver ticket booklet (Carnet de 10 tickets Lila) valid two hours each on the Lila network and one hour on the TAN or STRAN networks when transiting from Lila.

=== Monthly and annual passes ===
Semitan issues a wide range of monthly and annual passes for different categories of travellers depending on their age and working conditions. Free transportation is granted to travellers with low revenues.

Semitan also sells monthly, termly and annual Lila, Métrocéane and Pratik+ passes, for several categories of persons depending on their age and working conditions.

== Traffic ==
In 2011, 116.5 million journeys were made on the TAN network, where a journey is defined as a single boarding on a single vehicle. Of these, 28.7 million were on Tramway line 1, 19.1 million on line 2, 18.7 million on line 3, 7 million on the Busway line 4, and 43 million on the rest of the network. On a typical weekday during the school term in 2011, 481.600 journeys were made on the network, of which 266.300 were on the tramway network.

In providing this service, the cumulative distance travelled by the Semitan fleet in 2011 was approximately 24.3 million kilometers, of which 5.5 million were run by the Tramway and Busway, 18.8 million by Semitan owned buses, and a further 4.7 million by chartered buses.

== Fleet ==
As of 2022, the TAN in service fleet included:

- 91 trams
- 140 standard buses
- 264 articulated buses
- 36 minibuses

== See also ==
- Nantes Tramway
- Nantes Busway
- Navibus
