= Busway =

Busway may refer to:

== Transport technologies ==
- Bus rapid transit, bus systems including some elements of light railways or metro systems
- Guided busway, concrete tracks exclusively for modified buses
- Bus lane, a lane reserved for buses and in some cases for taxis as well

=== Specific busway systems ===
- Cambridgeshire Guided Busway in the United Kingdom
- In Brisbane, Australia:
  - Eastern Busway, Brisbane
  - Northern Busway, Brisbane
  - South-East Busway, Brisbane
- The Luton to Dunstable Busway in the United Kingdom
- The Leigh-Salford-Manchester Bus Rapid Transit system in the United Kingdom, of which the Leigh-Ellenbrook Guided Busway is a key part.
- Nantes Busway in France
- Trans-Val-de-Marne bus rapid transit in southern suburb of Paris, France
- Guided busway in Essen, Germany
- In Auckland, New Zealand:
  - Northern Busway, Auckland
  - Eastern Busway, Auckland
- O-Bahn Busway in Adelaide, Australia
- A system of roads reserved for buses in Runcorn, England
- South Miami-Dade Busway in Miami, United States
- In Pittsburgh, United States
  - West Busway
  - South Busway
  - Martin Luther King Jr. East Busway
- In Los Angeles, United States
  - El Monte Busway
  - Harbor Transitway
- Transitway (Ottawa) in Ottawa, Canada
- Metroway operates a portion of its route on a dedicated busway in Northern Virginia, United States
- Transjakarta in Jakarta, Indonesia, some people also called it as Busway

== Transport companies ==
- Busways Travel Services, a defunct English bus company
- Busways, an Australian bus company

== Electrical technology ==
- Busway or bus duct, a sheet metal duct containing either copper or aluminium busbars (in electrical distribution system)
