= Bombardier Incentro AT6/5 =

Low floor tram vehicle

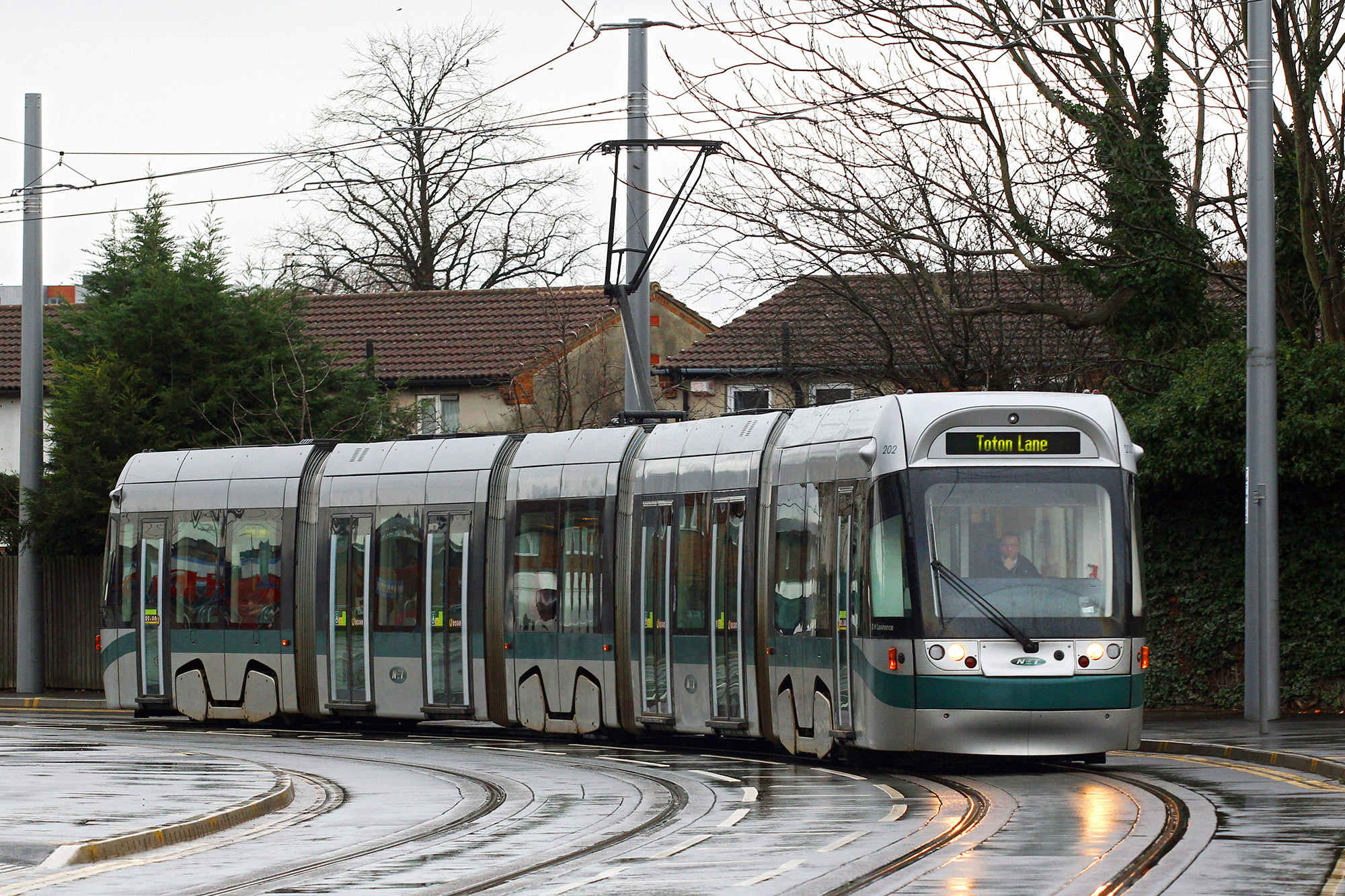
- Bombardier Incentro AT6/5 202

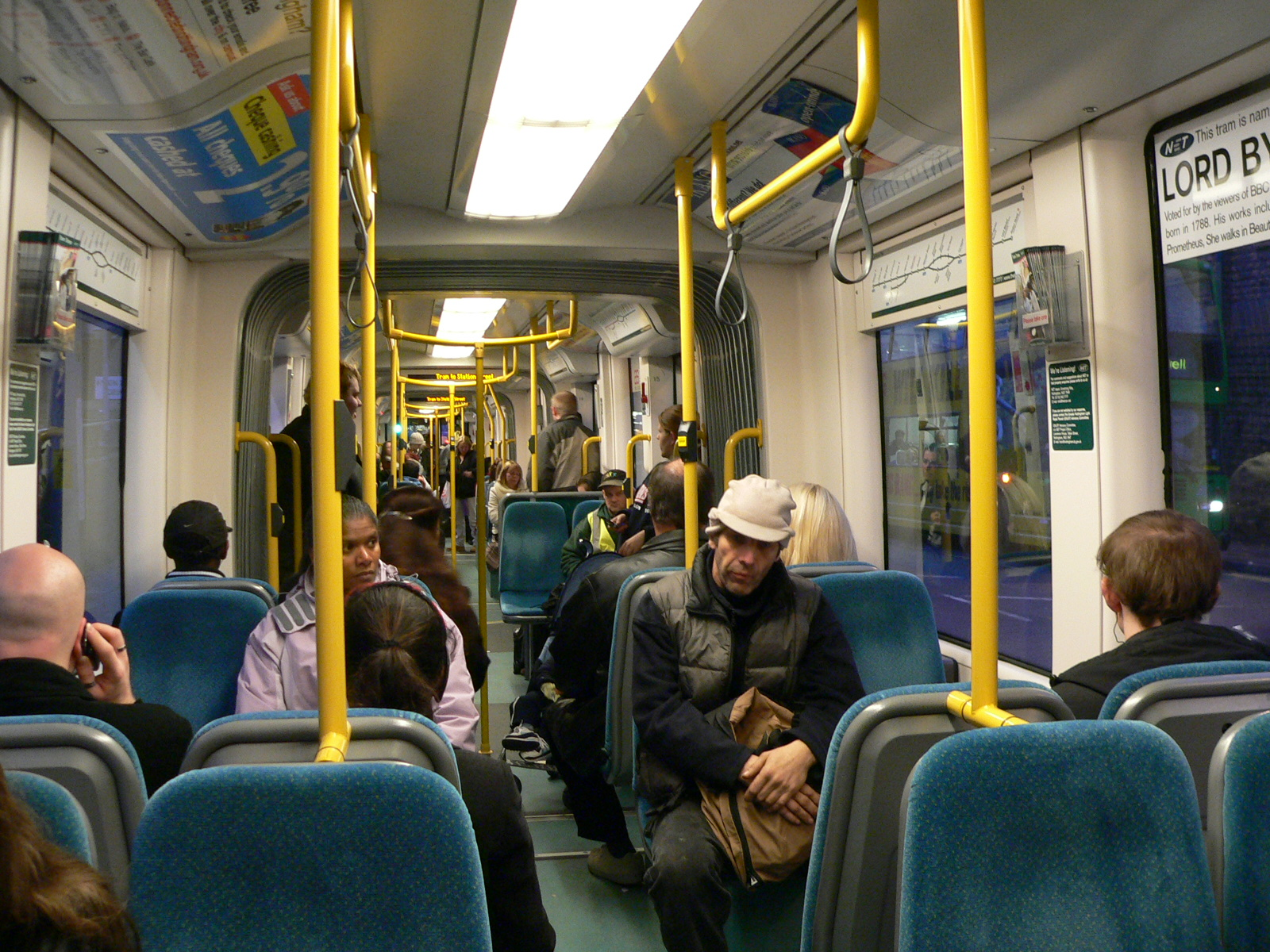
- Interior of 205
- In service: 2004–present
- Manufacturer: Bombardier Transportation
- Built at: Derby Litchurch Lane Works
- Family name: Incentro
- Constructed: 2002–2003
- Refurbished: 2013, 2019
- Number built: 15
- Number in service: 15
- Fleet numbers: 201–215
- Capacity: 54/8 seats, 129 standing per tram
- Operators: Nottingham Express Transit

Specifications
- Car body construction: Stainless steel, GRP cladding side windows and door frames, aluminium roof
- Car length: 33 m (108 ft 3 1/4 in)
- Width: 2.40 m (7 ft 10 1/2 in)
- Height: 3.35 m (10 ft 11 7/8 in)
- Floor height: 352 mm (13.9 in)
- Platform height: 317 mm (12.5 in)
- Articulated sections: 5
- Wheel diameter: 660–580 mm (26–23 in) (new–worn)
- Wheelbase: 1,800 mm (5 ft 11 in)
- Maximum speed: 80 km/h (50 mph)
- Weight: 39.3 tonnes (38.7 long tons; 43.3 short tons) per tram
- Traction motors: 8 × 45 kW (60 hp) asynchronous
- Power output: 360 kW (480 hp)
- Acceleration: 1.2 m/s^{2} (2.7 mph/s)
- Deceleration: 1.4 m/s^{2} (3.1 mph/s) (service); 2.5 m/s^{2} (5.6 mph/s) (emergency)
- Electric system(s): 750 V DC overhead catenary
- Current collection: Pantograph
- UIC classification: Bo′+2′+Bo′
- Bogies: FLEXX Urban 1010
- Safety system(s): CITYFLO 150
- Track gauge: 1,435 mm (4 ft 8 1/2 in) standard gauge

Notes/references
- Sourced from unless otherwise noted.

The Bombardier Incentro AT6/5 is a 100% low floor tram used by Nottingham Express Transit (NET) in Nottingham, England. It is a variant of Bombardier Transportation's Incentro design.

== Incentro AT6/5 ==
Bombardier Incentro trams were designed and built by ADtranz for the Tramway de Nantes in 2000–2001, and the AT6/5 is almost identical but 3.4 metres shorter. In 2000 ADtranz signed a package deal for the construction of the NET tramway and for the delivery of 15 trams but in 2001 before work began ADtranz was acquired by Bombardier Transportation, which carried out the construction and manufacturing work between 2002 and 2003. The trams entered service on 9 March 2004 and run on 750 volts DC with a top speed of 80 kilometres per hour (50 mph). They are articulated in five sections, and are 33 metres long and 2.4 metres wide.

=== Names ===
From a very early stage, the trams were named after famous local people. Vinyl transfers carrying the names are on diagonally opposite corners of the exterior. Upon introduction they were also on the front (in direction of travel) right-hand side above the windows, in the same style as advertisements.

- 201 Torvill & Dean. Voted for by listeners of the local commercial radio station Trent FM. Named after Olympic Gold Medal figure skating champions Jayne Torvill and Christopher Dean from Nottingham, who gained an unmatched perfect "6.0" score at the 1984 Winter Olympics.
- 202 D. H. Lawrence. The Nottinghamshire novelist, born in Eastwood, famous for "Lady Chatterley's Lover" and "Sons and Lovers".
- 203 William "Bendigo" Thompson. Voted for by viewers of East Midlands Today. A bare-knuckle fighter.
- 204 Erica Beardsmore. Hyson Green-based supporter of Nottingham In Bloom
- 205 Lord Byron. Voted for by viewers of East Midlands Today. Nottinghamshire poet.
- 206 Angela Alcock. Voted for by readers of the Nottingham Evening Post. A local Oxfam donations collector who has raised countless funds for charity.
- 207 Mavis Worthington. Voted for by readers of the Nottingham Evening Post. A Homestart volunteer.
- 208 Dinah Minton. Founder of the Headway charity.
- 209 Sid Standard (renamed from Sydney Standard by public demand). Nominated by Nottingham Evening Post readers. He ran a bike shop in Beeston for 27 years and was President of the Beeston Road Club. It is believed that he rode more than 500,000 miles on his bike.
- 210 Sir Jesse Boot. Voted for by listeners of BBC Radio Nottingham. Founder of Boots the Chemist.
- 211 Robin Hood. Voted for by viewers of East Midlands Today. Famous local legend.
- 212 William Booth. Founder of the Salvation Army.
- 213 Mary Potter. Voted for by listeners of BBC Radio Nottingham. Foundress of the Sisters of the Little Company of Mary.
- 214 Dennis McCarthy MBE. Former presenter of BBC Radio Nottingham.
- 215 Brian Clough. Voted for by listeners of Trent FM. Football manager, won the European Cup twice with Nottingham Forest F.C.

=== Refurbishment ===
In December 2012, NET announced that the fleet would be refurbished and receive a new livery and interior. The first to be refurbished was tram 215, which was released for passenger service on 8 March 2013. Trams 214, 213, 205, 202, 203 have since been refurbished.

The 22 new Alstom Citadis 302 trams, built for the tramway extensions are in the new livery. The refurbishment had been planned for a while, as the artist impressions of the new trams showed that their seating was the same as the seating in the refurbishment – the impressions were released in June 2012.

A further refurbishment of the Incentro trams began in 2019, with tram 203 being the first to be treated. The refurbished Incentro trams have had mechanical work undertaken as well as a new livery, to make the trams look more similar to the Citadis fleet.
