= Bombardier Incentro =

Tram manufactured by Adtranz and then by Bombardier

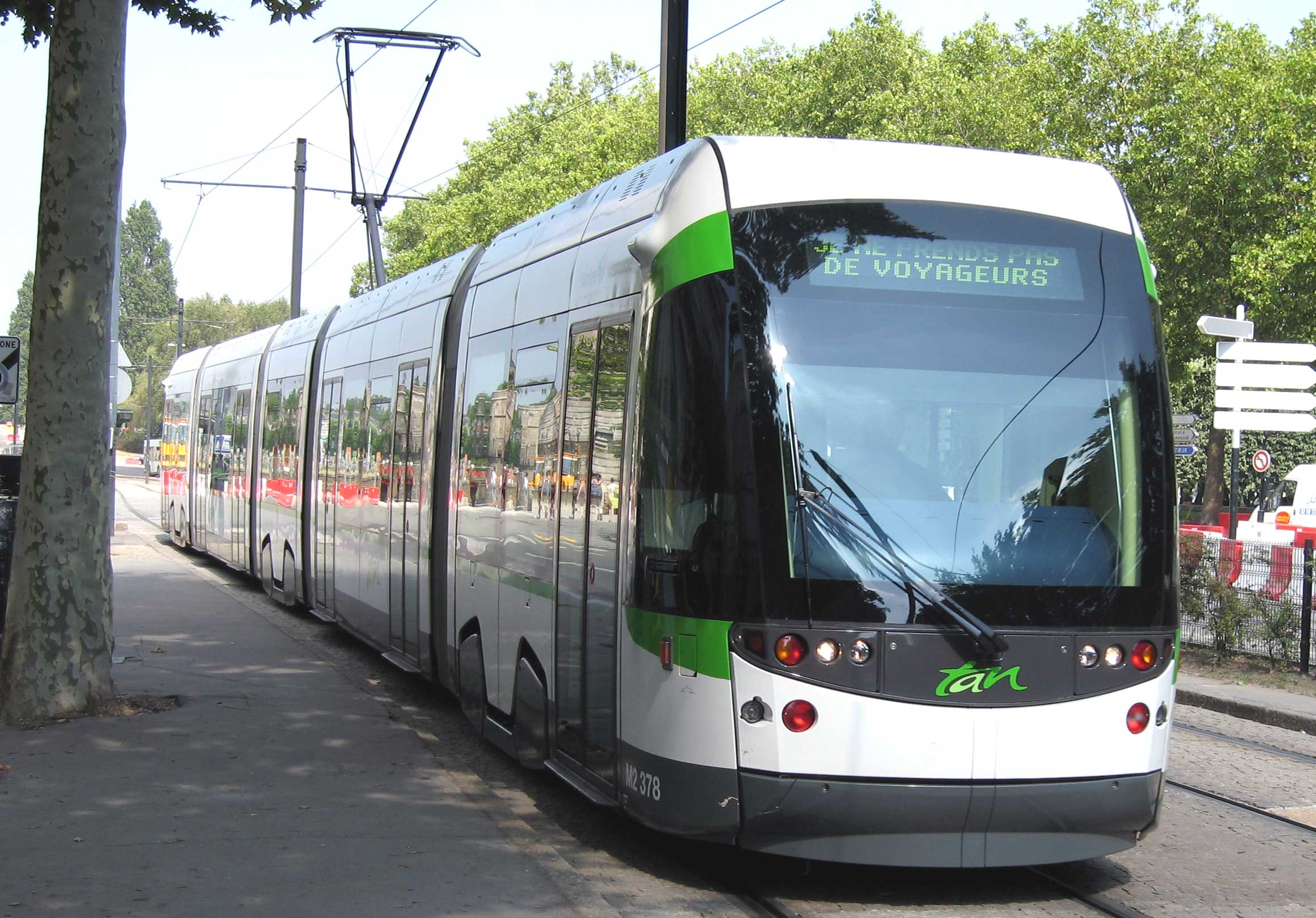
- An Incentro in Nantes
- Manufacturer: Bombardier Transportation
- Designer: Adtranz
- Capacity: 182 (AT6/5L) or 129 (AT6/5) standing passengers, at 4/m^{2} (3.3/sq yd)

Specifications
- Train length: 36.4 m (119 ft 5 1/8 in) (AT6/5L); 33 m (108 ft 3 1/4 in) (AT6/5)
- Width: 2.4 m (7 ft 10 1/2 in)
- Floor height: 350 mm (13 25/32 in)
- Low-floor: 100%
- Articulated sections: 5
- Wheel diameter: 660–580 mm (25.98–22.83 in) (new–worn)
- Wheelbase: 1.8 m (5 ft 11 in)
- Maximum speed: 80 km/h (50 mph)
- Weight: 38.9 t (38.3 long tons; 42.9 short tons) (AT6/5L); 39.3 t (38.7 long tons; 43.3 short tons) (AT6/5)
- Traction motors: 8 × 45 kW (60 hp) asynchronous
- Power output: 360 kW (480 hp)
- Electric system(s): 750 V DC overhead catenary
- Current collector(s): Pantograph
- UIC classification: Bo′+2′+Bo′
- Bogies: FLEXX Urban 1010
- Seating: 64 (AT6/5L) or 54/8 (AT6/5)
- Track gauge: 1,435 mm (4 ft 8 1/2 in) standard gauge

The Bombardier Incentro (sold as the ADtranz Incentro until 2001) is a model of tram manufactured initially by Adtranz and later by Bombardier Transportation. It is a five-section, low-floor articulated tram, built for bi-directional operation and capable of speeds up to 80 km/h. Incentro trams are used on the Nantes tramway and fifteen of the AT6/5 variants are used on the Nottingham Express Transit.

The Incentro was designed by Adtranz, which was acquired by Bombardier in 2001. Bombardier no longer promotes the model, favouring instead its own Flexity family, which includes similar models. The Incentro models had a strong influence on the development of the Flexity Berlin model presented during 2008. Vienna Transportation purchased the Flexity Vienna in 2014, which is also based on the Incentro. While Niigata Transys had licensed the design for the Japanese market, the drive shaft was changed in such a way that it is considered a separate model. The trams for the Fukui and Okayama tram systems, however, still look similar to the Incentro based on their headshape design.

== Fleet details ==
Class	City	Number built	Year built	In service since	Unit nos.
AT6/5L	Nantes	33	1999–2002	2000	351–383
AT6/5	Nottingham	15	2002–2003	2004	201–215
