= Nantes tramway =

Tramway network in Nantes, France

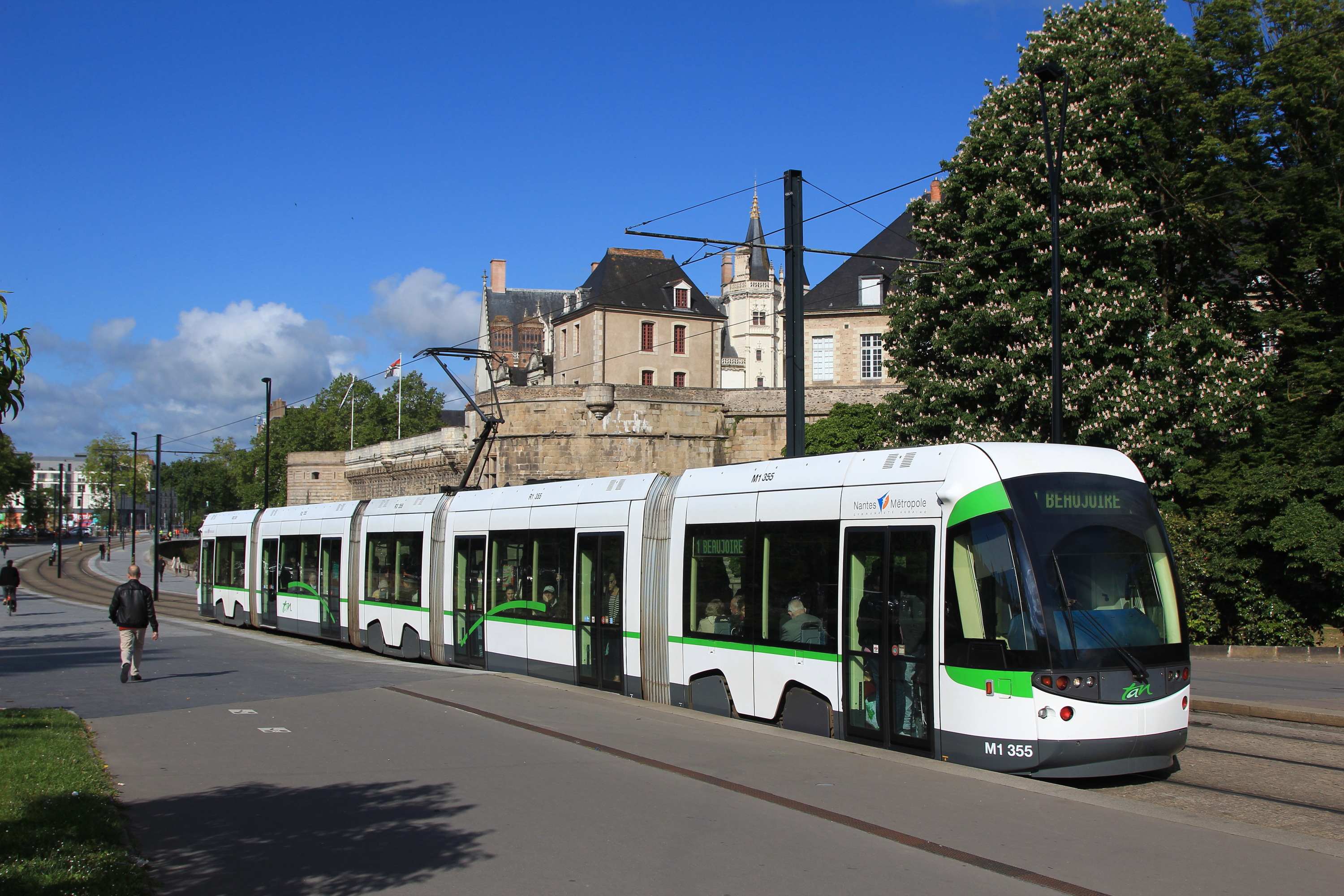

Overview
- Native name: Tramway de Nantes
- Locale: Nantes, Pays de la Loire, France
- Transit type: Tram
- Number of lines: 3
- Number of stations: 83
- Annual ridership: 73.89 million (2018)

Operation
- Began operation: 7 January 1985
- Operator: Semitan

Technical
- System length: 44.3 km (27.5 mi)
- Track gauge: 1,435 mm (4 ft 8 1/2 in)
System map
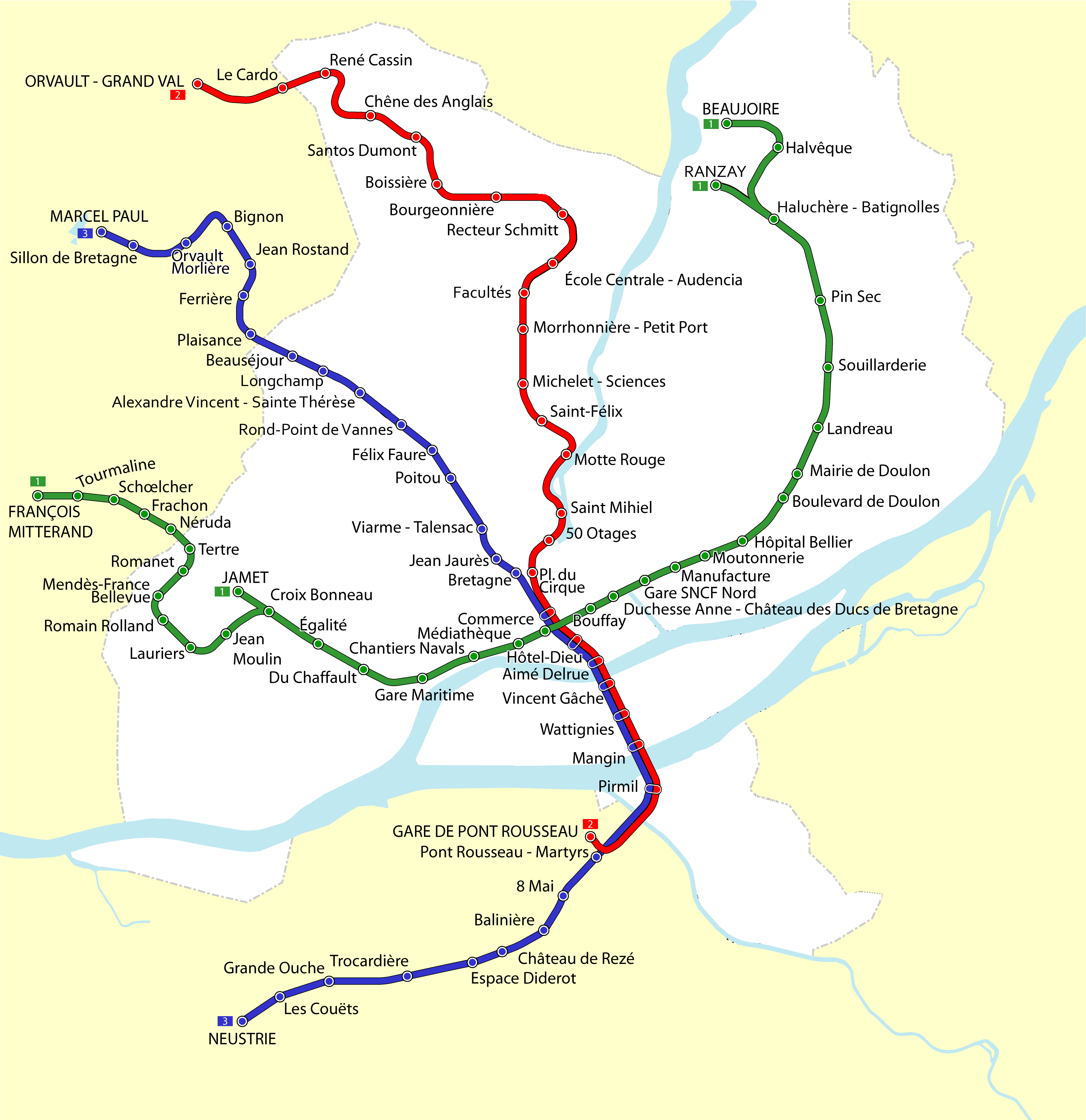
Map of Nantes tramway

The Nantes tramway (French: Tramway de Nantes) is a tramway system operating in the city of Nantes in Pays de la Loire, France. The first tramway in Nantes opened in 1879 and closed in 1958 due to bombing damage during World War II, while the present tramway was re-introduced to the city in 1985.

The first tramway in Nantes was notable for its use of compressed air propulsion pioneering this technology. In the 1980s, Nantes became the first city in Europe to re-introduce the present tramway which was the first modern 'new generation' tramway to be built, reversing the trend of tramway closures that had been going on since the middle of the 20th century and becoming the first in a wave of tramways built from scratch in France and the rest of Europe.

The current Nantes tramway network consists of three lines, is 43-kilometre (27 mi) long and serves 83 stations. It is operated by Semitan (commercially known as TAN), the operator of Nantes public transport network. All new MRT lines are busway lines (two BRT lines) and have gained much more riders than planned.

== History ==
=== Compressed-air trams (1879–1917) ===
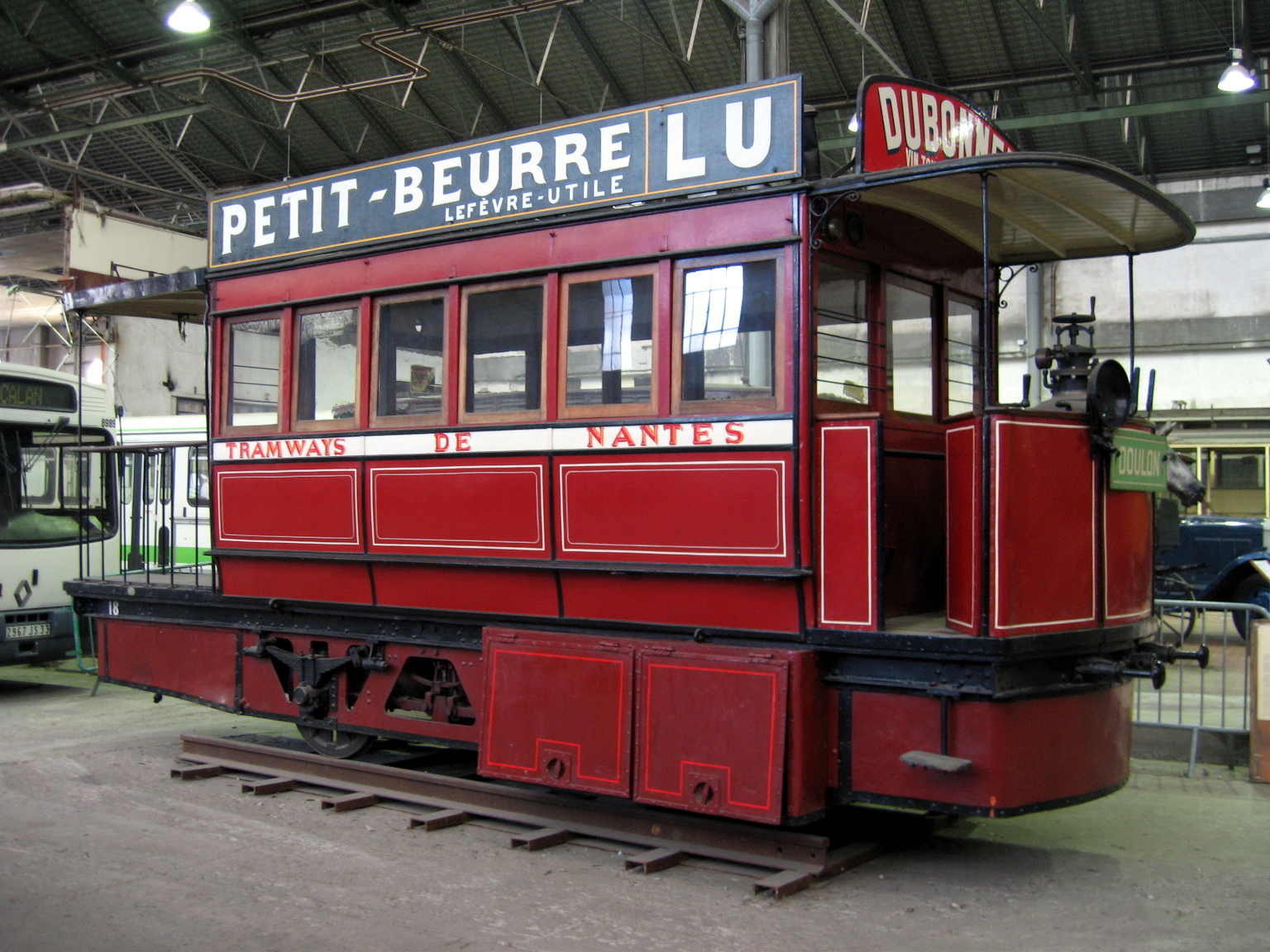
Preserved Nantes compressed air tramcar at the AMTUIR museum

The history of the tramway in Nantes began on 13 December 1879 with the opening of the first line. Service was provided using standard gauge tramcars propelled by compressed air, using the Mekarski system. The cars stored the compressed air in steel cylinders, and were periodically topped up with air and steam (used to heat the compressed air) at a pair of recharging stations. The later Nantes cars operated at 5.8 MPa (840 psi).

The first line constructed was just over 6 km (3.7 mi) long and was a mostly level route operating east–west along the quays of the River Loire. The initial fleet comprised 22 trams, 2 locomotives and four open top trailers. A second line, running north–south and crossing both the original line and the River Loire was opened in 1888.

Further extensions, together with a third line along the banks of the River Erdre, brought the length of the system to 39 km (24 mi) by 1910. By then the fleet had grown to 94 trams, 3 locomotives and 10 open top trailers, and was carrying 12 million passengers per year. By this stage compressed air trams were seen as old-fashioned, and it was decided to electrify the system. Replacement began in 1913, and the last compressed air tram ran in 1917.

Nantes compressed air tramcar 22, later renumbered 18 and dating from 1879, still exists and is the only surviving compressed air tram in the world. It is part of the collection at the AMTUIR museum in Paris, but was in Nantes in 1992.

=== Electric trams (1911–1958) ===
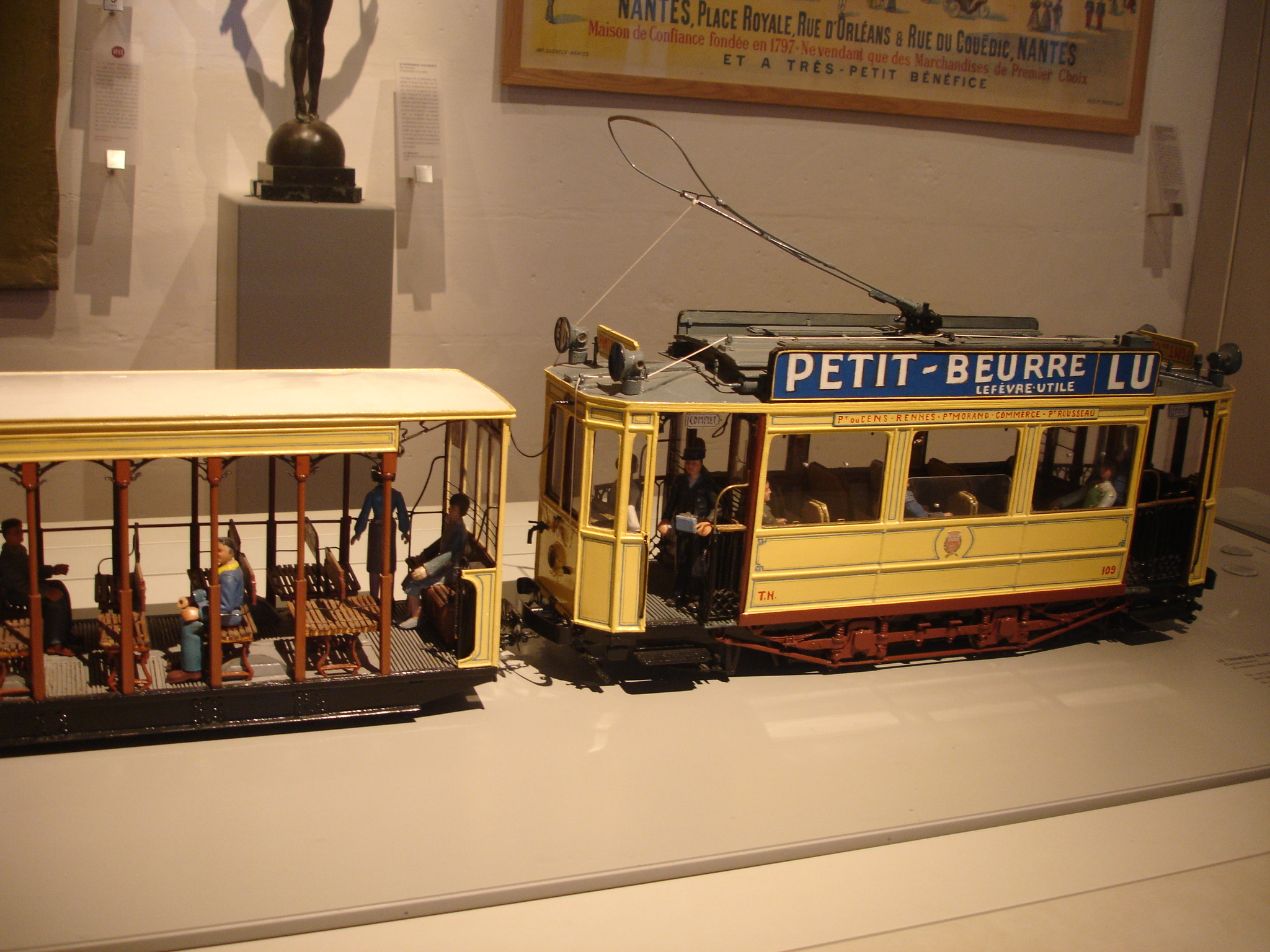
A model of a Nantes electric tram set in the Nantes History Museum

In 1911 the intention to electrify the network was announced by the mayor, Paul Bellamy, but work did not start until just before the outbreak of World War I. By 1915, 8 lines were in service, and work was not completed until the end of 1919. The company standardized its fleet of 100 tramcars, all on Brill trucks with vestibuled platforms. Further extensions were opened, and by 1932 there were 20 lines serving 14 routes. The network was centered at Place du Commerce, which is still today the center of Nantes's tramway network.

During World War II, the network was heavily damaged by continued bombing, and several lines were immediately converted to bus operation due to the prohibitive cost of repairs. After the war, tram was seen as being obsolete, noisy and uncomfortable. The decision to replace all tram services by buses was made in 1949, with the last tram running in 1958.

=== Modern network (1985–present) ===
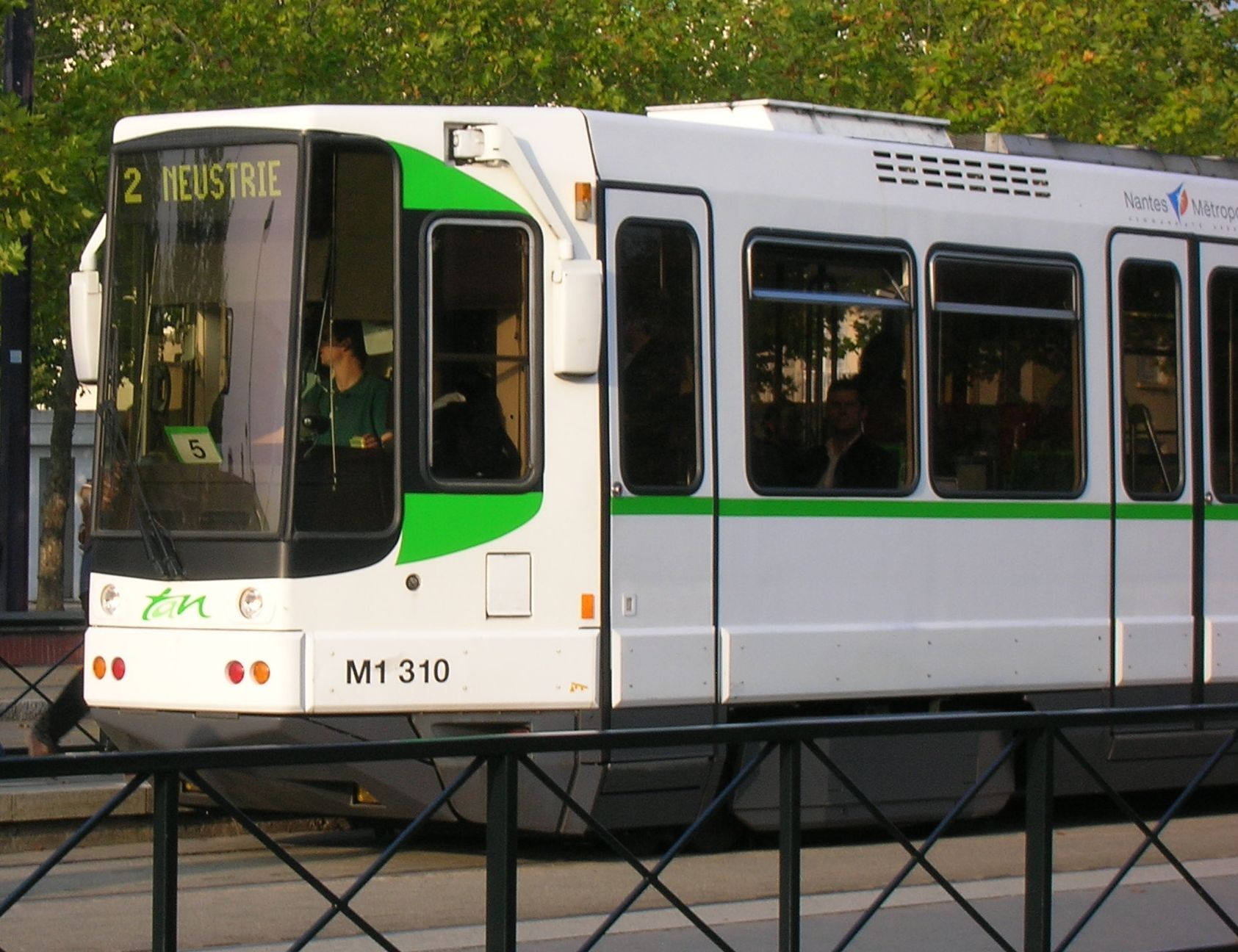
TFS tramcar of the type that reopened the Nantes tram system

By the end of the 1970s, transport in Nantes was heavily biased to the motor car. In an attempt to relieve congestion, the construction of a Highway along the quays of the River Edre was proposed. The destruction of the urban fabric this would have caused resulted in an outcry and the proposal was rejected. Various public transport solutions were investigated, including improved bus or trolleybus services (rejected as having too limited a capacity), and a metro (rejected as too expensive). Finally a tramway was proposed.

At this point in time, the idea of constructing a new tramway was revolutionary. The trend throughout the world had been to close existing tramways rather than open new ones, and only three relatively small tram systems remained in France (the Lille, Marseille and Saint-Étienne systems). In North America the very beginning of a light rail renaissance was just starting to be seen, with the Edmonton LRT system opening in 1978, followed by the Calgary C-Train and San Diego Trolley systems in 1981. No significant new tramway system had been built in Europe in many years.

Against this background, Nantes's municipal council gathered a team of engineers to discuss the possibility of building a new tramway system. The project was set up on 10 February 1981 and financial details sorted. The government accepted financing 30% of the construction. Alstom was chosen for the construction of twenty tramcars.

The tramway was finally re-opened in January 1985, with a single line connecting Place du Commerce with Haluchère in the north-east of the city. A month later the section from Place du Commerce to Bellevue in the west opened, resulting in a 10.4 km (6.5 mi) line that had 22 stations. This line, the core of the current line 1, was an immediate success and carried 42,000 passengers daily by the end of the first year. Line 1 was extended by 2.2 km (1.4 mi) and two stations from Haluchère to Beaujoire were added in April 1989.

The success of line 1 led to the decision to construct the north–south line 2, which connects with line 1 at Place du Commerce. Line 2 opened from a southern terminus at Trocadière to 50 Otages, just north of the city center, in September 1992. Subsequent northward extensions reached Orvault Grand Val two years later. The first section of line 3 opened in August 2000. This shared tracks with line 2 from its southern terminus at Hotel Dieu, south of Place du Commerce, to a point just north of Commerce station, from where it ran on its own tracks to Longchamp in the north-west of the city.

An extension at the western section of line 1 took it to François Mitterrand in August 2000 adding several new stations through a new extension, transforming Bellevue station into a major transport hub and link it in continuity to the new terminus and leaving the old Rommanet and Jamet stations abandoned (although Jamet station has been reopened a few years later now at the end of a branch, and old Rommanet has been destroyed whereas platforms and tracks have been kept, and the new station was rebuilt a few meters away on the extension). In April 2004, line 3 was extended from Longchamp to Sillon de Bretagne. In August 2005, line 2 was extended 2.2 km (1.4 mi) and three stations from Trocadière to Neustrie. In September 2007, a short stub and terminus was constructed off line 2 at Pont Rousseau, and line 2 cut back from Neustrie to there. In compensation, line 3 was extended from Hotel Dieu to Neustrie.

In January 2009, line 3 was extended some 600 metres (2,000 ft) from Sillon de Bretagne to the pre-existing bus depot of Marcel Paul, which was converted to also accommodate trams. A new terminal stop, also known as Marcel Paul, was created adjacent to the depot. In October 2012, a new 800 metres (2,600 ft) branch was created at the eastern end of line 1, running to a terminus at Ranzay, as part of the first phase of the project to make a connection between lines 1 and 2. The same day, the first of the twelve new CAF Urbos trams, ordered in 2010, was commissioned.

== Lines ==
The network is now 44 kilometres long and has 83 stations. In 2011, The traffic figures for the Tramway network are 266,300 journeys a day and 66.5 million journeys a year.

=== Line 1 (François Mitterrand/Jamet - Ranzay/Beaujoire) ===
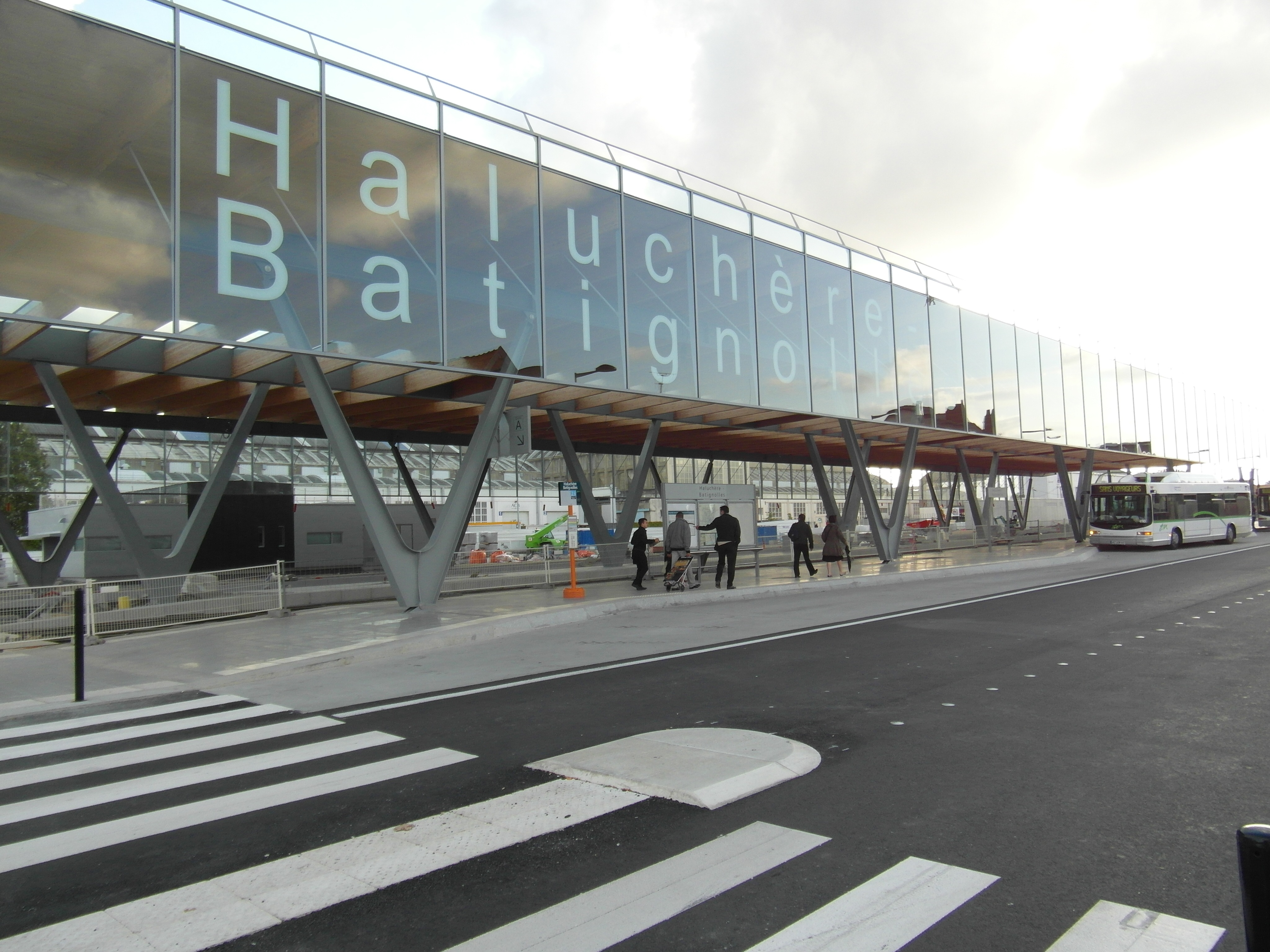
Haluchère-Batignolles station on line 1

This was the first line to open in 1985. Originally running between Bellevue (today Mendes France Bellevue) and Haluchère (today Haluchère - Batignolles) and entirely built on reserved track, following the trackbed of a line of the former tramway network. Line 1 serves the Stade de la Beaujoire along with Parc Des Expositions De La Beaujoire (the city's biggest exhibition center), the main railway station of Nantes, the city's main and largest public library and the region's and Nantes's largest shopping mall Atlantis Le Centre along with Nantes's Zenith in the suburb of Saint-Herblain.

The line is normally operated with two overlapping alternate services, with one running between Beaujoire and François Mitterrand, and the other between Ranzay and Jamet. With 28.7 million journeys made in 2011, line 1 is the busiest line on the network as it serves the very heart of the city as well as major facilities of the city and is one of the busiest Tramway lines in France and Europe. Line 1 is also prone to saturations all year round especially at peak times and on weekends.

=== Line 2 (Gare de Pont Rousseau - Orvault Grand Val) ===
Line 2 transported 19.1 million passengers in 2011 making it the second most used Tramway line in Nantes and one of the busiest in France. As with line 1, line 2 at rush hours is subject to saturation as it serves the campus of the University of Nantes at Petit Port, Nantes's hippodrome and main sports facilities, and Hôtel-Dieu Nantes's main and largest hospital. In September 2007, Line 2 changed its course on its southern part, giving some of its former tracks to line 3 and having a new southern terminus westward, now located at Pont-Rousseau in Rezé adjacent to Rezé-Pont-Rousseau station.

=== Line 3 (Neustrie - Marcel Paul) ===
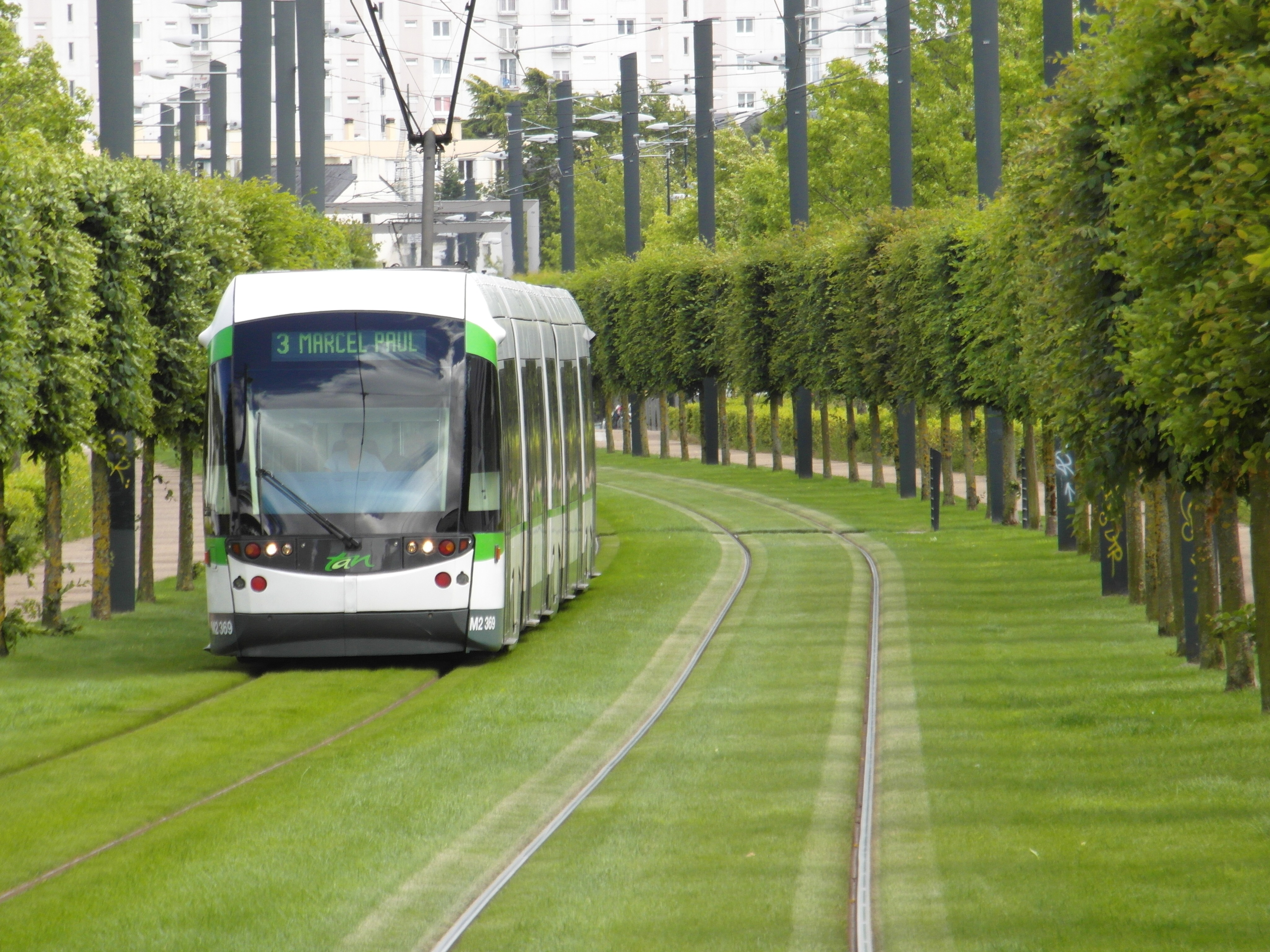
Green spaces along the tracks

Line 3 began operation in August 2000 and was extended in 2007. Line 3 now also runs on the former southern tracks of line 2, towards its terminus at Neustrie, an important transport hub near Nantes Atlantique Airport and Airbus facilities. A shuttle bus links the short distance between the airport and Neustrie giving an alternative to the "Navette Aéroport" linking downtown Nantes and Nantes Atlantique Airport. In 2011, 18.7 million journeys were made on the line making line 3 the third most used line on the network. It also serves as line 2 Hôtel Dieu, Nantes's main and largest hospital, Tour Bretagne and the Route de Vannes, a large superstore driving area spreading along several kilometers, coupled with a shopping mall and a hypermarket.

=== Network expansion ===
A connection between lines 1 and 2 is due to open in 2013 on the northern part of the network. The link will take the form of an extension of the branch of line 1 to Ranzay, opened in 2012, to Recteur Schmitt on line 2, creating two new stations, "Babinière sud" and "Martin Luther King". The planned tramway expansion has not been realized by march of 2023 according to the network map below.

=== All new MRT lines (Line 4 and Line 5) are bus lines in a BRT area. ===
The new MRT lines 4 and 5 have no longer used a LRT system but BRT. Line 4 named Busway started 2006 on 7 km with 15 bus stops serving 26 500 riders a day. 2015 it attracted twice as many. 2013 it was BRT certified gaining bronce excellence. Due to still increasing ridership bi-articulated electric buses were ordered in 2019. Nantes gained the UITP-award 2021 for Operational and Technological Excellence of the electric bus system.

== Rolling stock ==
The fleet is composed of 91 tramcars of three types, two of which are the TFS-1 and the Adtranz Incentro. Both types serve all three lines. In 2011, Nantes also ordered eight CAF Urbos trams, with four options, from Spanish manufacturers CAF.

=== Alstom TFS-1 ===
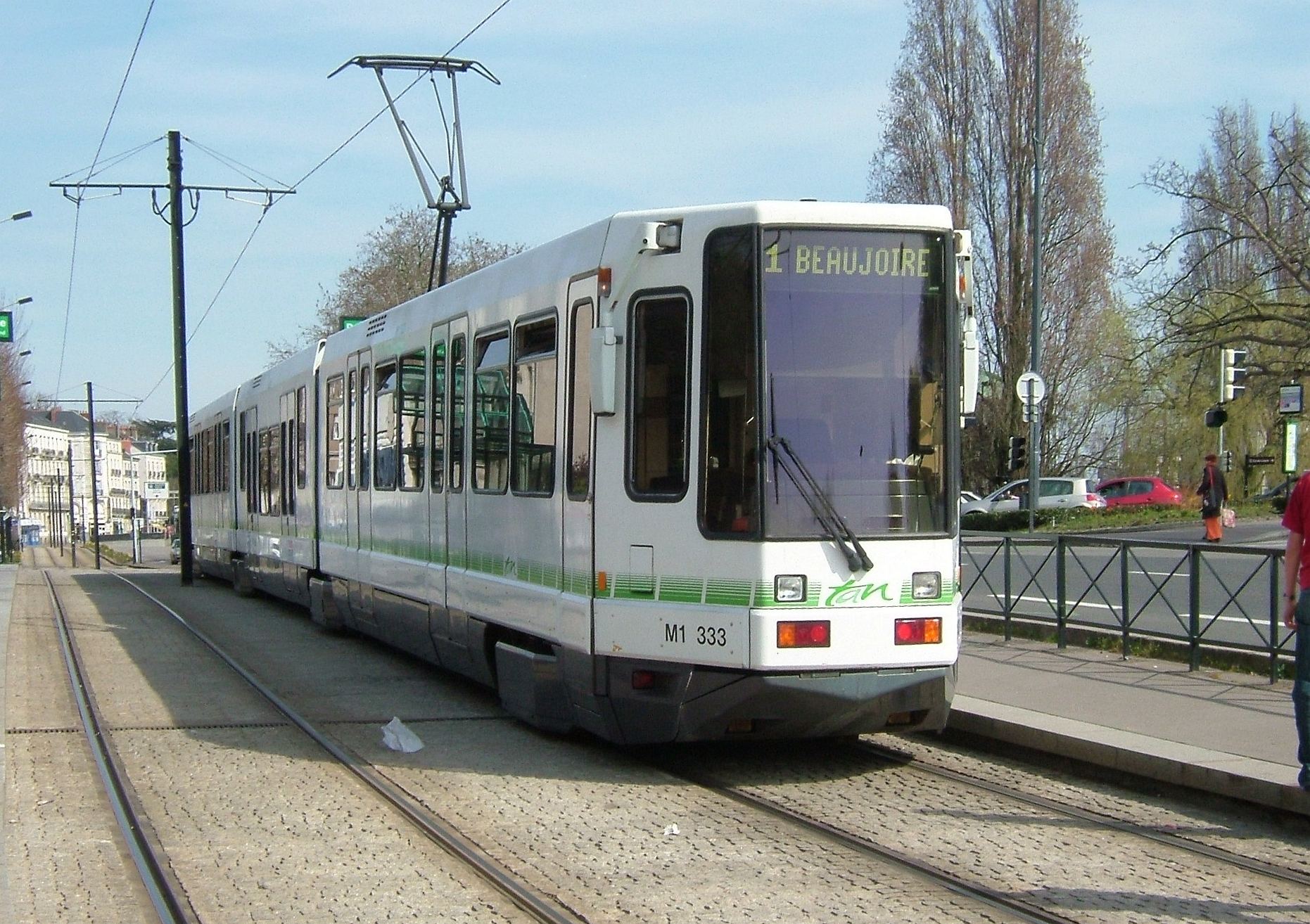
Stretched TFS-1 tramcar; note the high floor level and doors in the outer sections, and the low floor centre section added at a later date.

Line 1 opened with 20 cars of type TFS-1, this being the original variant of the Alstom TFS design. TFS stands for Tramway Français Standard, and the intention was that this design would become the standard for subsequent French tramway systems. However, in the end the design was significantly revised for the Grenoble tramway, the second system to open, introducing the low-floor TFS-2 variant. Consequently, only Nantes has ever operated the TFS-1 variant.

As built, the TFS-1 were double-ended, single-articulated 6-axle tramcars with a high floor and steep stepped access from low level boarding platforms. The tramcars built in this form were rebuilt, from 1992 onwards, with an added low-floor center section, thus becoming 8-axle double-articulated cars with a length of 38 m (125 ft). Nantes subsequently bought further TFS-1 trams in this 8-axle configuration. Nantes now has 46 of these trams, built in 4 tranches from 1985 to 1994.

Characteristics:

- Number of trams: 46
- Length: 39.15 m (128 ft 5 in)
- Width: 2.3 m (7 ft 7 in)
- Height: 3.25 m (10 ft 8 in)
- Weight: 51.96 t (51 long tons; 57 short tons)
- Capacity: 353 (58 seating, 285 standing)
- Bogies: 4
- Access: 2×6 double sliding doors + 2×1 single sliding doors
- Air conditioned: non-equipped

=== Adtranz Incentro ===
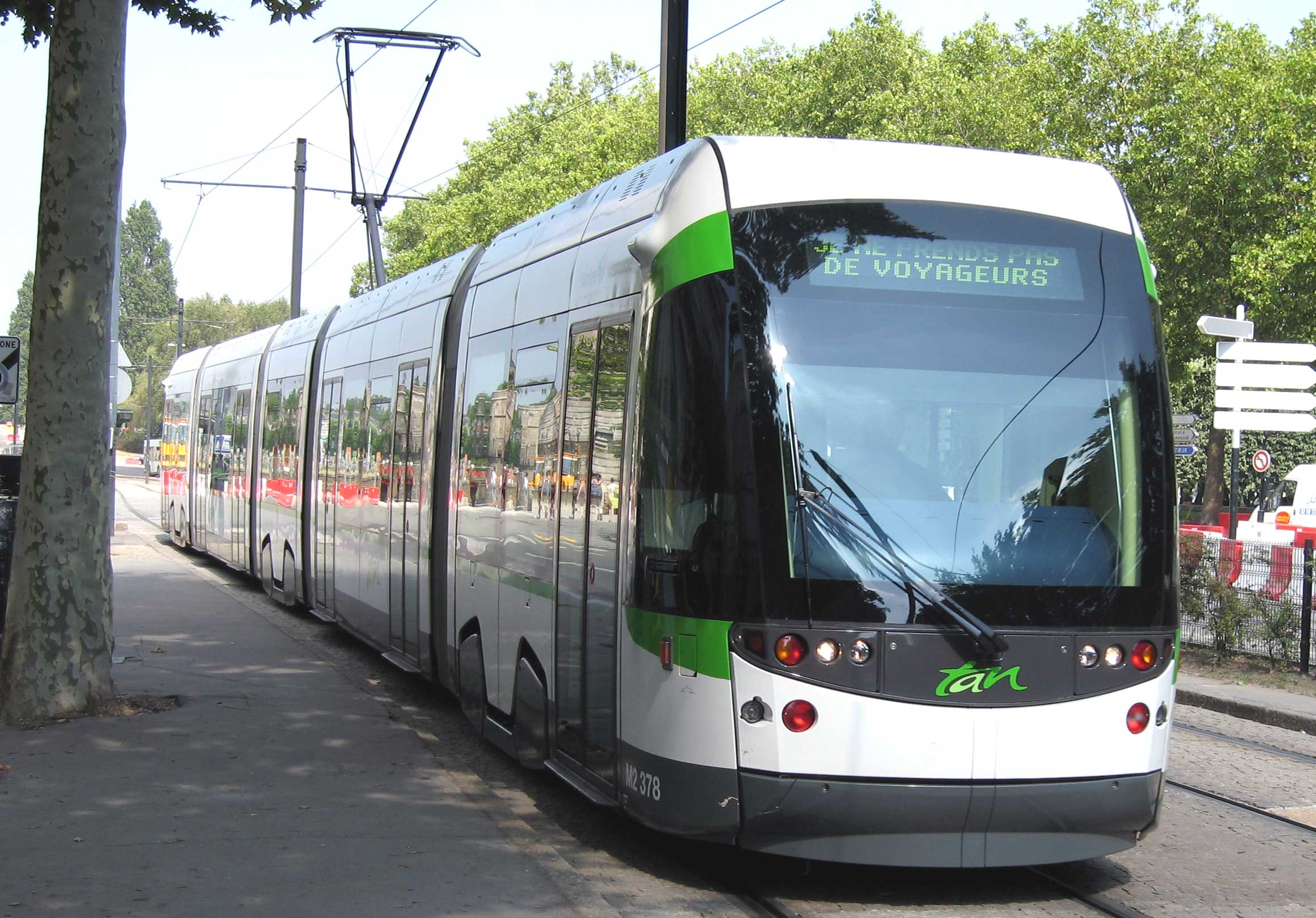
Adtranz Incentro tramcar; note the low floor throughout.

Unlike most other French tramways, Nantes decided not to use Alstom's successor to the TFS tramcar, the Citadis. Instead, in 1997, Nantes became the first city to order a fleet of trams from German manufacturer Adtranz to the Incentro design. This modular design is made up of cab, powered and suspended sections, and is 100% low-floor. The trams built for Nantes are air-conditioned, double-ended and consist of five sections, with a length of 36.4 m (119 ft; 1,433 in). Nantes now has 33 of these trams, which are similar to the fifteen AT6/5 trams found on the Nottingham Express Transit.

Characteristics:

- Number of trams: 33
- Length: 36.42 m (119 ft 6 in)
- Width: 2.4 m (7 ft 10 in)
- Height: 3.28 m (10 ft 9 in)
- Weight: 38.7 t (38 long tons; 43 short tons)
- Floor height: 350 mm (1 ft 2 in)
- Maximum speed: 80 km/h (50 mph)
- Capacity: 322 (72 seating, 250 standing)
- Bogies: 3
- Wheel diameter: 660 mm (2 ft 2 in)
- Access: 2×6 double sliding doors
- Air conditioned: equipped

=== CAF Urbos 3 ===
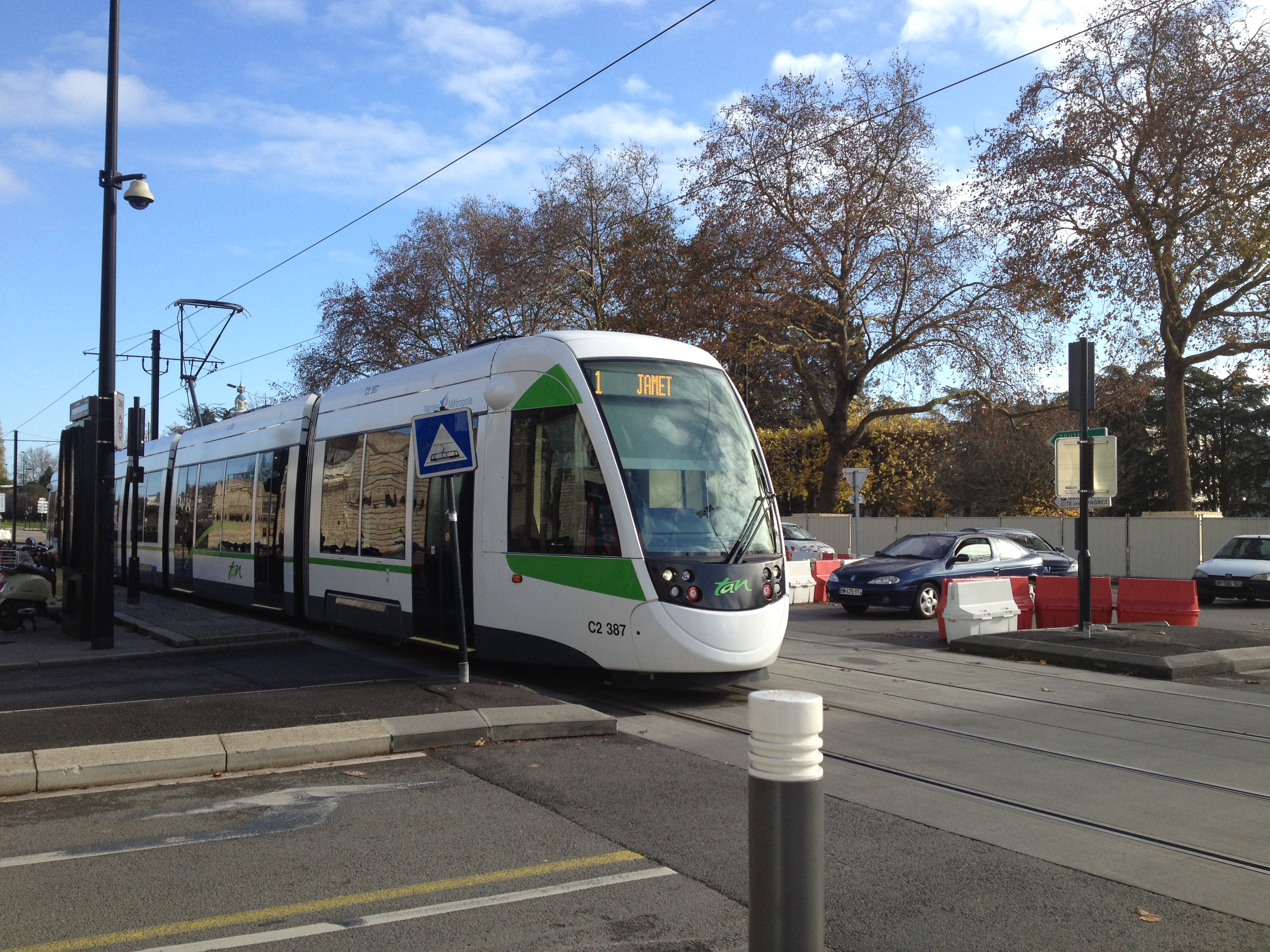
CAF Urbos 3 low floored tramcar

In 2010, Nantes Métropole selected the Urbos 3 design from Spanish manufacturer CAF to relieve overcrowded trams and assure commercial operation of the extension interconnecting the lines 1 and 2. The order comprised a firm order for eight trams at a cost of €22 million, together with an option on four additional trams at an additional cost of €10 million. The Urbos 3 is esthetically and technically very similar to the Incentro trams, and is also 100% low-floored and is air-conditioned. The Urbos 3 started running from autumn 2012.

Characteristics:

- Number of trams: 8 + 4
- Length: 37 m (121 ft; 1,457 in)
- Capacity: 249
- Access: 2 × 6 double sliding doors
- Air conditioned: equipped

=== Alstom Citadis ===
In June 2020, Semitan ordered 61 Alstom Citadis trams for delivery from 2022 in order to enter service in 2023. The seven section articulated vehicles will be 48 m (157 ft; 1,890 in) in length and will be 100% low-floor. They will replace the TFS-1 trams.

== Operation ==
The network is operated by Semitan, known as TAN for short. Semitan is responsible for the whole public transport network throughout the Nantes Metropole (Greater Nantes), and the Metropole has a majority shareholding in the company.

Transdev, which is also involved in the operation of several other tram systems, including the Grenoble, Montpellier, Nottingham and Strasbourg systems, has a minority shareholding in Semitan. This allows some exchange of information and assistance between these systems. As an example, the tram drivers for Montpellier were trained in Nantes.

=== Station equipment ===
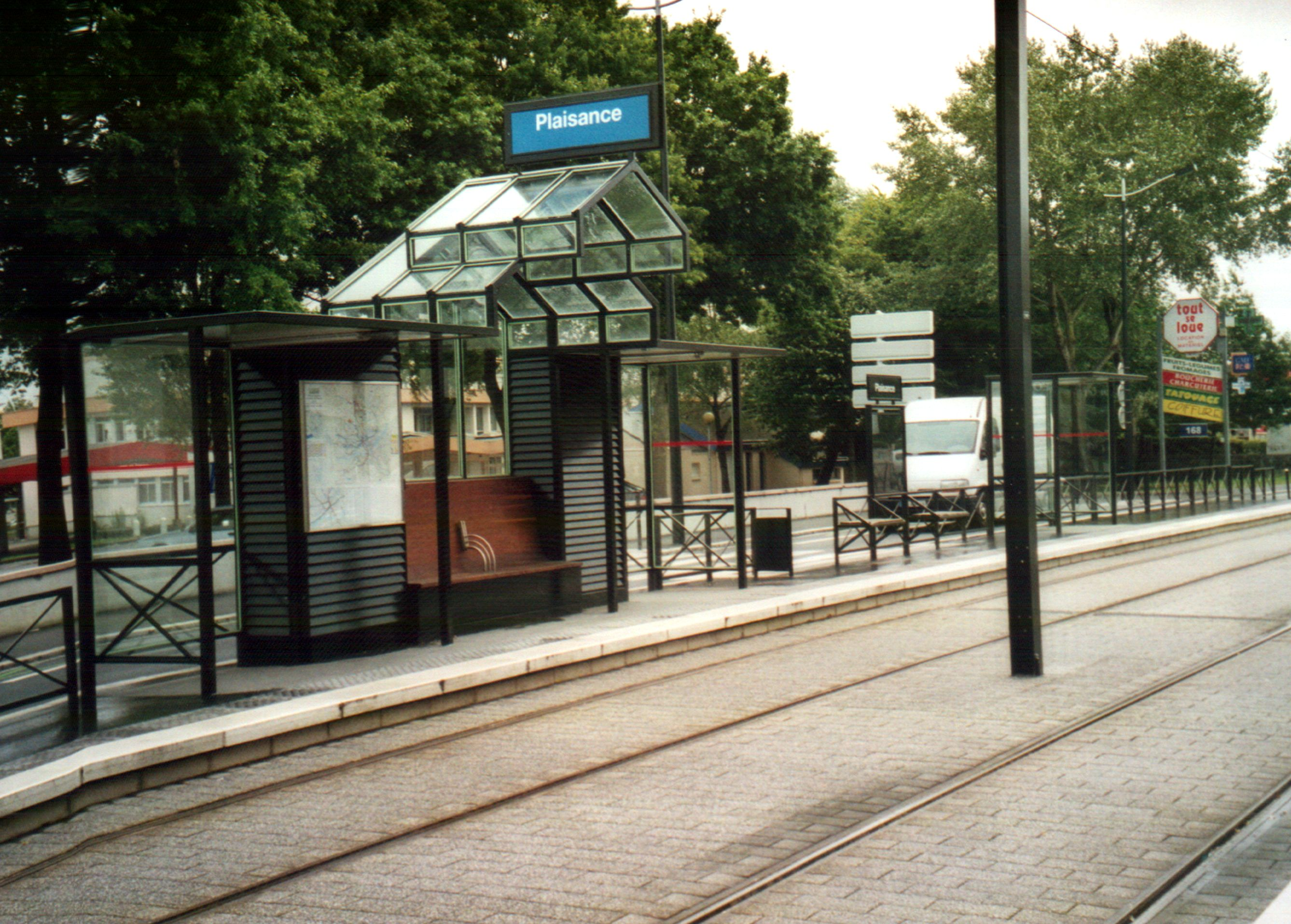
Plaisance station on Line 3

All stations have realtime passenger information LED displays showing realtime estimated passage of the next tram, large round clocks, speakers only used for special announcements, automatic ticket machines which sell a wide range, seating and shelters. Some major stations have staffed ticket offices and connect with other modes of transport such as Nantes buses and Lila buses.

=== Hours of operation ===
Nantes's Tramways do not run 24 hours a day. Service on the network starts at 04:00 and runs to 01:00 on weekdays and Sundays, and from 04:00 to 03:00 on Saturdays. Delays occur occasionally, mainly due to demonstrators or minor incidents, and maintenance work on the network is done mostly during summers.

== Fares ==
The TAN network in Nantes uses paper tickets and passes, though in the near future contactless smartcards will replace them. There are no travel zones on the network in Greater Nantes. Tickets and passes allow free transfer and are universally valid on the Tramway, Busway, Nantes buses, Navibus, and suburban trains within Nantes Métropole. Tickets are not sold inside the trams, but ticket machines (which accept cash and credit cards) are present at every Tramway and Busway station. Tickets must be validated inside the trams when boarding. There are also some staffed ticket offices opened for limited periods only.

=== Single trip and day tickets ===
Semitan issues singles trip tickets (Ticket 1 h) valid for one hour, a 10x saver ticket booklet (Carnet de 10 tickets 1h) valid one hour each, a discounted 10x saver ticket booklet (Carnet de 10 tickets 1h - Tarif réduit) valid one hour each, an airport transit ticket (Ticket navette aéroport), a 24-hour ticket (Ticket 24h) valid an entire day for one traveller and a 24-hour ticket valid an entire day for up to four persons (Ticket 24h/4 personnes).

Semitan also sells Lila and Métrocéane tickets.

Lila: Single trip tickets (Ticket unité Lila) valid two hours on the Lila network (departmental buses in Loire-Atlantique) and one hour on the TAN or STRAN (Saint-Nazaire buses) networks when transiting from Lila, a 10x saver ticket booklet (Carnet de 10 tickets Lila) valid two hours each on the Lila network and one hour on the TAN or STRAN networks when transiting from Lila.

=== Monthly and annual passes ===
Semitan issues a wide range of monthly and annual passes for different categories of travellers depending on their age and working conditions. Free transportation is granted to travellers with low revenues.

Semitan also sells monthly, termly and annual Lila, Métrocéane and Pratik+ passes, for several categories of persons depending on their age and working conditions.

== Traffic ==
In 2012, 69.2 million journeys were made on the tramway system, where a journey is defined as a single boarding on a single vehicle. Of these, 30.1 million were on line 1, 20.3 million on line 2 and 18.8 million on line 3. On a typical weekday during the school term in 2012, approximately 274.300 journeys were made on the network, with 113.910 journeys a day on line 1, 85.740 on line 2 and 74.650 on line 3.

In providing this service, the cumulative distance travelled by the tram fleet in 2007 was approximately 4.5 million kilometres.

== See also ==
- Nantes Busway
- Navibus
- Semitan
- Trams in France
- List of town tramway systems in France
