= Navibus =

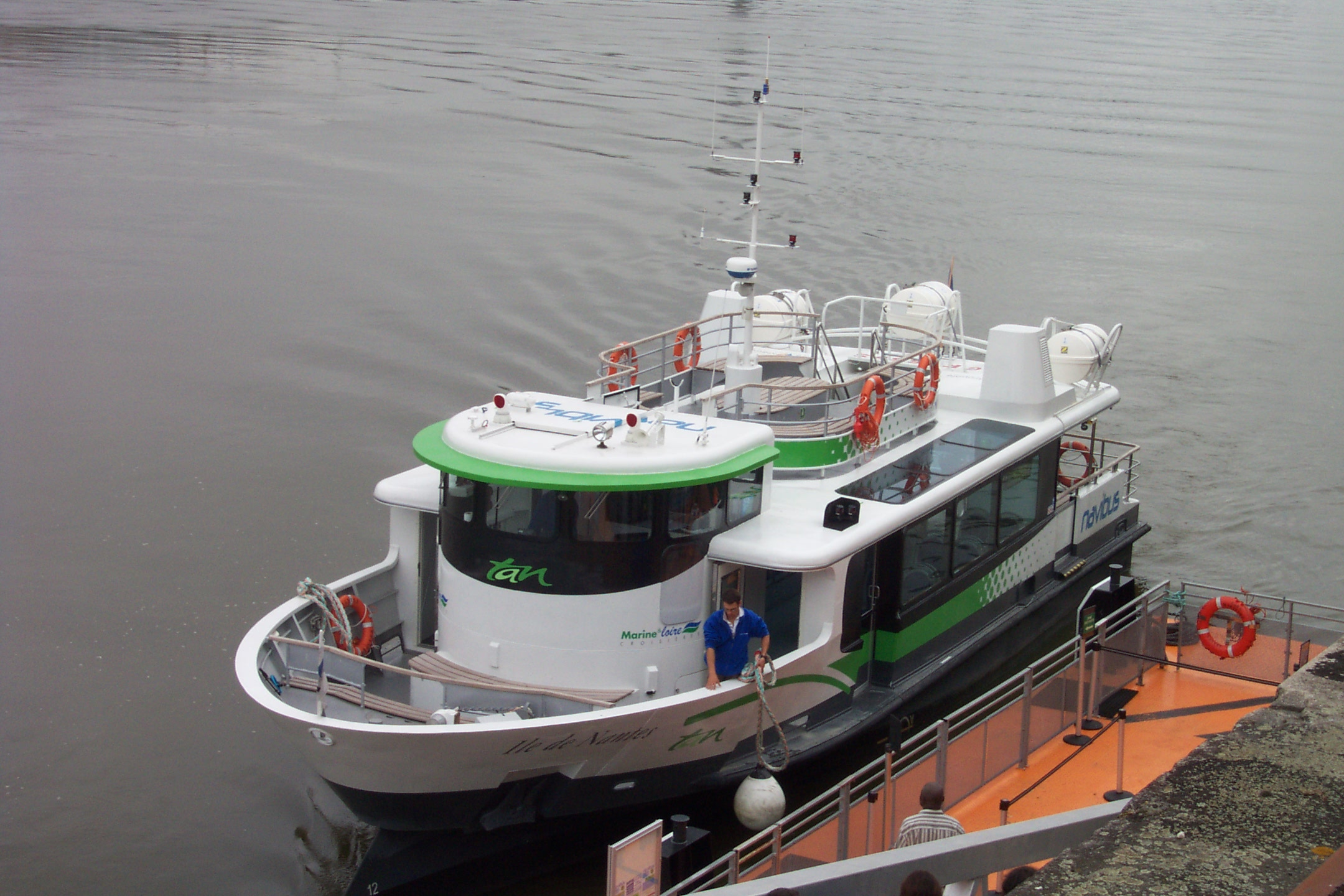
The Isle de Nantes approaching the jetty at Gare Maritime on the Navibus Loire service.

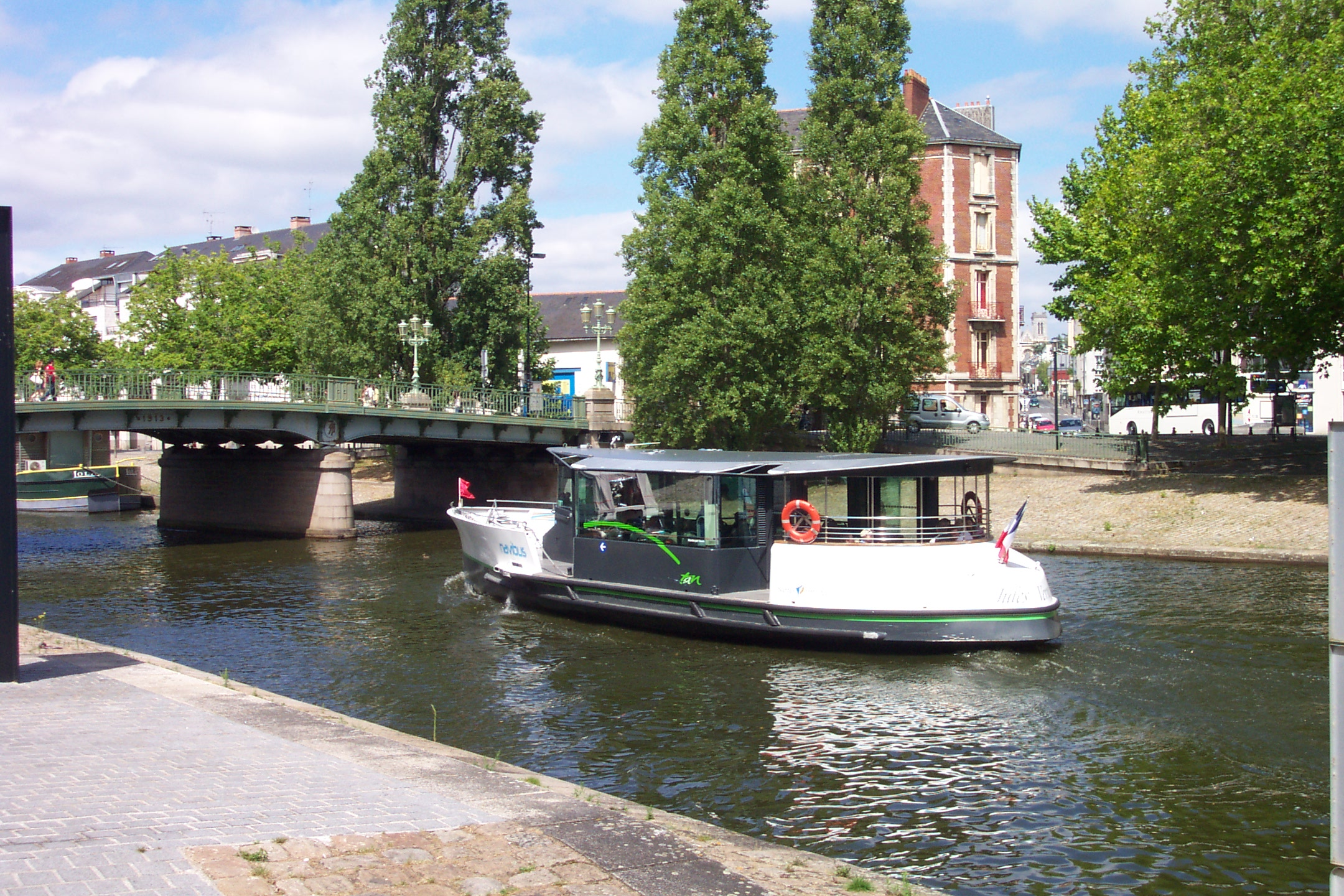
The Jules Verne on the River Erdre in central Nantes, operating the Navibus Erdre service.

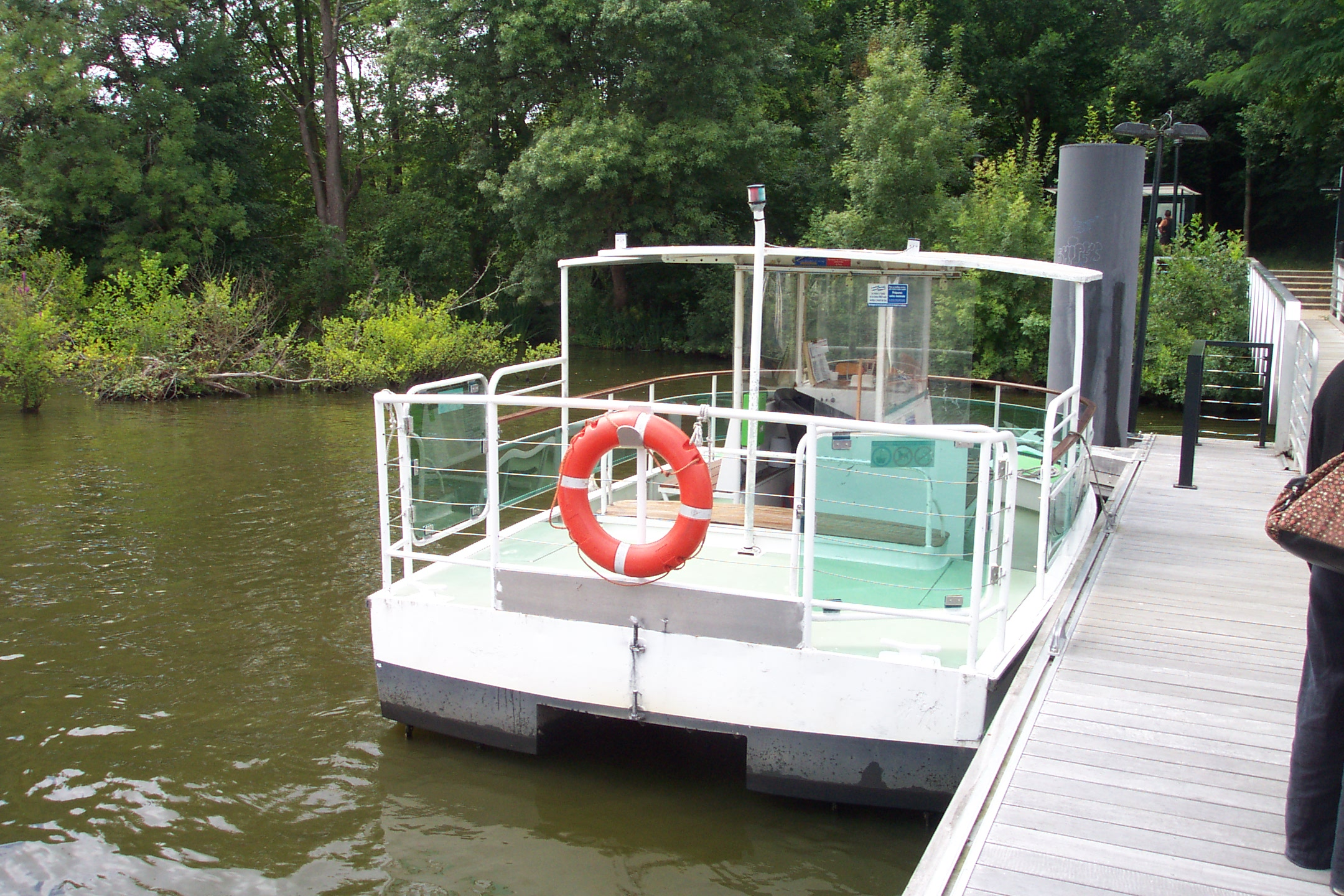
The Mouette at the Petit Port/Facultés jetty, operating on the Navibus Passeur de l'Erdre service.

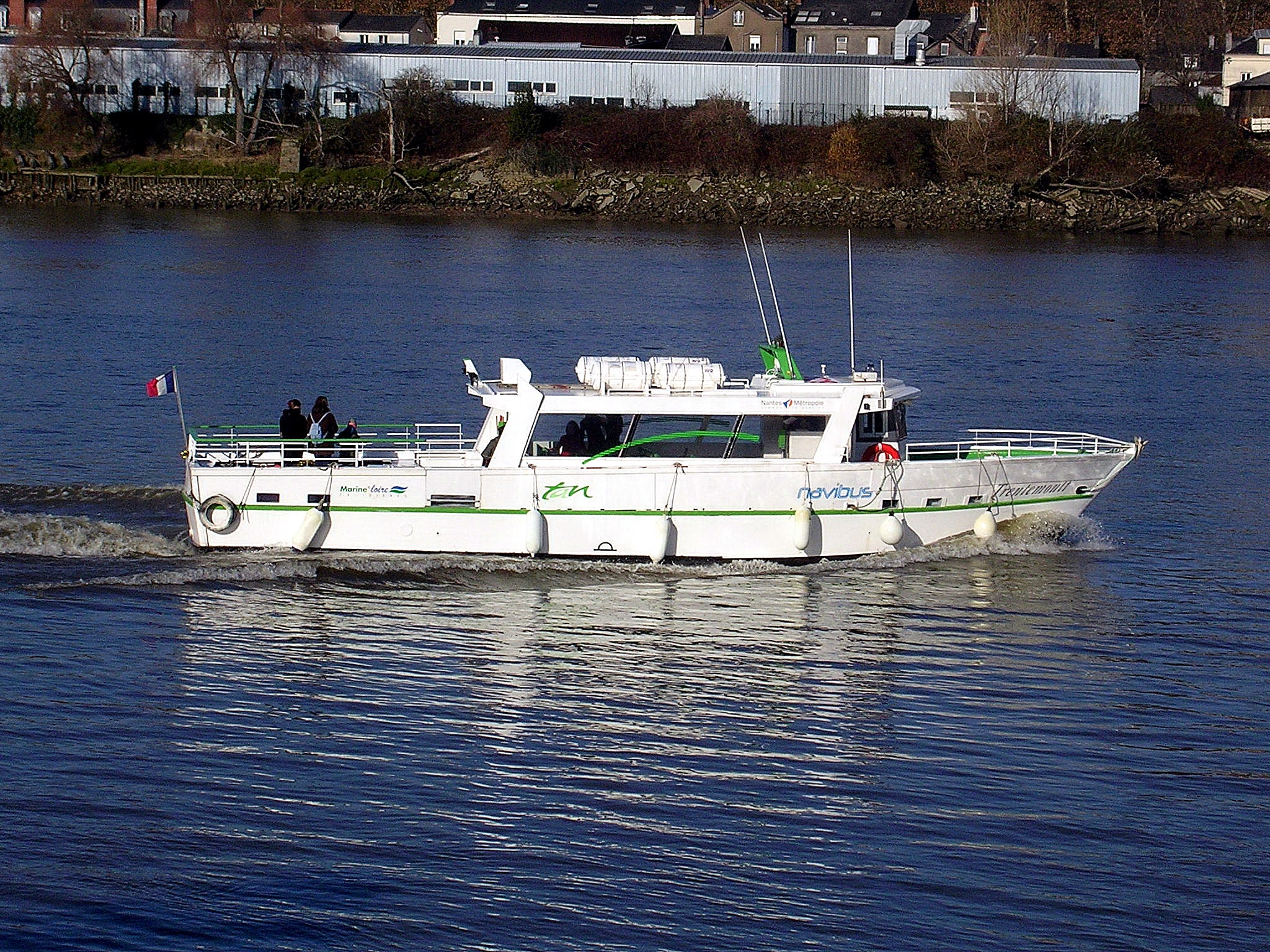
The Trentemoult operating on the Navibus Loire service in 2005.

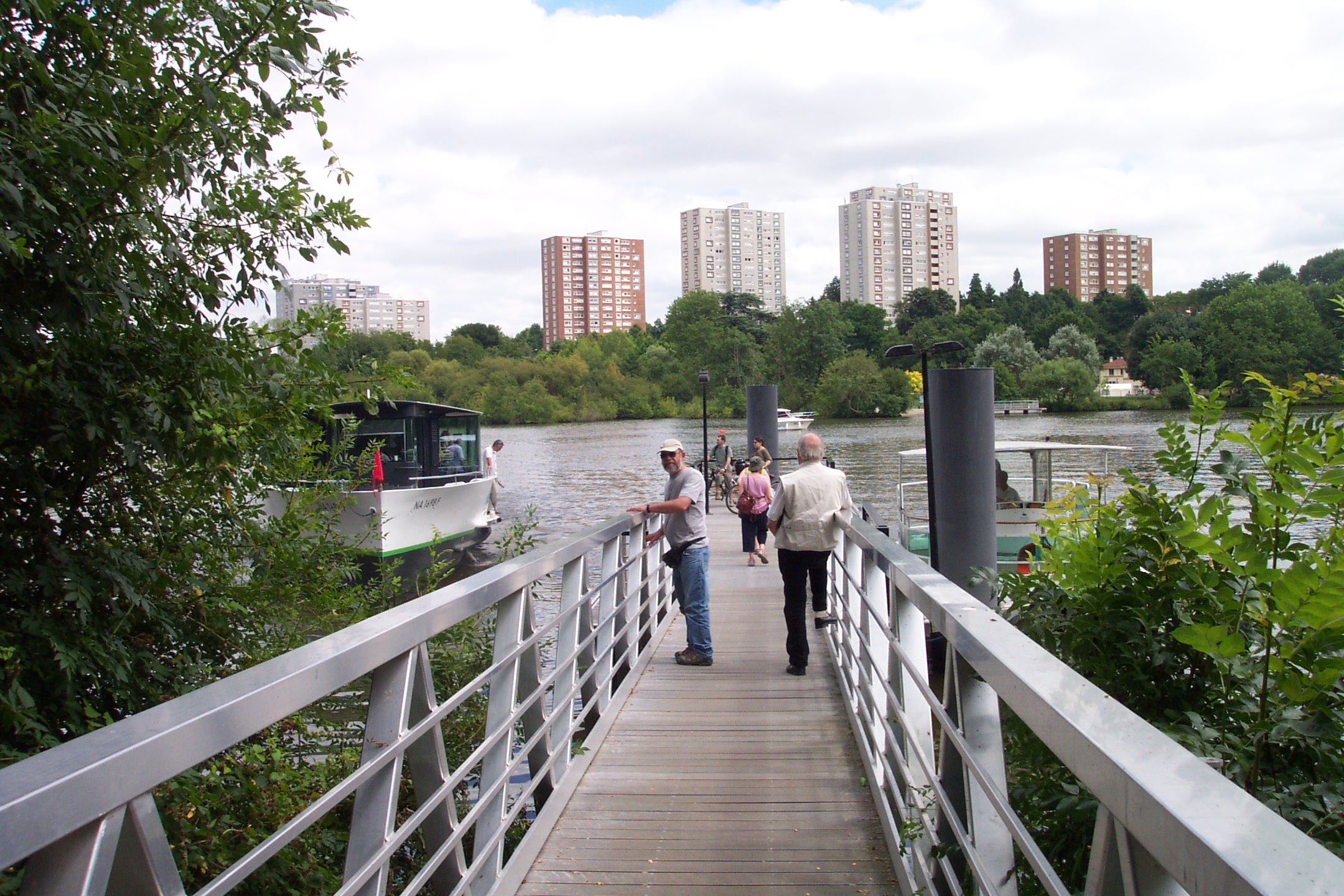
The Petit Port/Facultés jetty, with Jules Verne and Mouette coming alongside.

Navibus is a group of water bus routes in the French city of Nantes, operated as part of the Tan urban transit network that also includes buses and trams. Routes operate on both the River Loire and the River Erdre, and accept the full range of standard Tan tickets.

The current services date back to an initial trial service on the River Loire in 2005. Historically, services were operated on the River Loire between 1887 and 1958 by a flotilla of eight steam boats known as roquios.

== Navibus routes ==
Three routes are operated:

- The Navibus Loire that operates along the River Loire from the Gare Maritime, on the north bank close to the city centre and Tramway de Nantes line 1, to the fishing village of Trentemoult on the south bank of the river. This route is operated throughout the day by a single boat providing a 20 minute interval service, with an additional boat increasing the frequency to 10 minutes during peak periods.
- The Navibus Erdre that operates from the southern entrance to Nantes railway station, through the 800m St Felix canal tunnel to a stop at St Mihiel, immediately adjacent to the stop of the same name on tram line 2, and up the River Erdre to a terminus at the Petit Port/Facultés, close to the campus of the University of Nantes. This service is operated by a single hybrid diesel electric boat on a 60 minute interval.
- The Navibus Passeur de l'Erdre that crosses the River Erdre from the Petit Port/Facultés to Port Boyer on the opposite bank. This is operated by a single small boat on demand.

== Navibus fleet ==
Five vessels operate, or have operated, on the various Navibus routes.

List of vessels
| Vessel | Acquired | Dimensions | Capacity | Notes |
| Trentemoult | 2005 | length 17.5m width 4.1m draught 1.1m | 80 passengers 5 bicycles | Single deck ferry now in reserve. |
| Chantenay | 2005 | length 18.7m width 5.8m draught 1.35m | 92 passengers 10 bicycles | Double deck ferry used on the Navibus Loire. |
| Isle de Nantes | 2007 | length 18.7m width 5.8m draught 1.35m | 92 passengers 10 bicycles | Sister ship to Chantenay also used on the Navibus Loire. |
| Jules Verne | 2005 | | 90 passengers 10 bicycles | Hybrid diesel electric drive single deck ferry used on the Navibus Erdre. |
| Mouette | | | 12 passengers 5 bicycles | Electric drive single deck ferry used on the Navibus Passeur de l'Erdre. |
