= 1865–66 Nottingham Forest F.C. season =

English football club season

Nottingham Forest F.C.
1865–66 season
Home colours

The 1865–66 season was Nottingham Forest's first season in existence. Nottingham Forest Football Club originally emerged from a group of "shinty" players who played a then popular game very similar to hockey. At a time when football began to emerge as a growing force, a special meeting took place in 1865 at the Clinton Arms, Shakespeare Street to discuss a proposition moved by J.S.Scrimshaw to switch games from "shinty" to football. This was passed, and the first official football match played was on 22 March 1866 against Notts County (who had been formed in 1862). Following a brief transitional period and the establishment of new committee the playing of shinty was dropped and the name "Nottingham Forest Football Club" was born.

== Team kit ==
The year 1865 was of equal importance in that at the same meeting at the Clinton Arms, the other main resolution passed was for the team to purchase a dozen red caps, complete with tassels, thereby establishing the official club colour: "Garibaldi Red", named after the leader of the Italian freedom fighters known as the Redshirts, who were universally popular in England at that time.

== Matches ==
=== Summary ===
Nottingham Forest played their first ever match on 22 March 1866 against local opposition, Notts County, at the Forest Recreation Ground. 17 of Forest's players played just 11 of Notts' and it finished 0–0. They played again less than a month later which also finished 0–0.

=== Results ===
22 March 1866 Friendly	Nottingham Forest	0–0	Notts County	Nottingham
				Stadium: Forest Recreation Ground; Referee: Hodges/Scrimshaw

19 April 1866 Friendly	Notts County	0–0	Nottingham Forest	Nottingham
