= Old Assembly Rooms =

Building in Nottingham, England

Coordinates: 52°57′5.5″N 1°8′53″W

Old Assembly Rooms, Nottingham
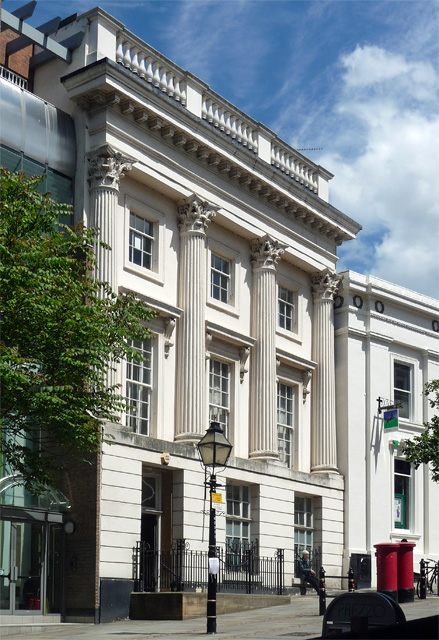
- Old Assembly Rooms, 9 Low Pavement, Nottingham

- Location within Nottingham

General information
- Location: 9 Low Pavement, Nottingham

Design and construction
- Designations: Grade II listed

The Old Assembly Rooms is a Grade II listed building at 9 Low Pavement, Nottingham.

== History ==
John Holland Walker records that there was an Assembly in Nottingham as early as 1739 The Old Assembly Rooms, also known as the Ladies’ Assembly, were built in the 18th century and consisted of a handsome, lofty and spacious room 67 feet (20 m) long and 21 feet (6.4 m) wide, with a gallery for music at the upper end. There were also two drawing rooms and a refreshment room. The building was altered in 1776-78 by John Carr, and repaired and enlarged in 1807–08 at a cost of £1,545 (equivalent to £118,000 in 2025) raised by public subscription. The building was originally owned by the proprietors of the Grand Stand racecourse, but they sold it in November 1835 for £1,100 (equivalent to £120,800 in 2025). to the committee of the News Society, for the use and accommodation of the Conservative Party in the town and neighbourhood. Thomas Winter re-fronted the building in 1836.

In 1907 the building was converted for office use.
