= 1766 food riots =

Series of riots in England

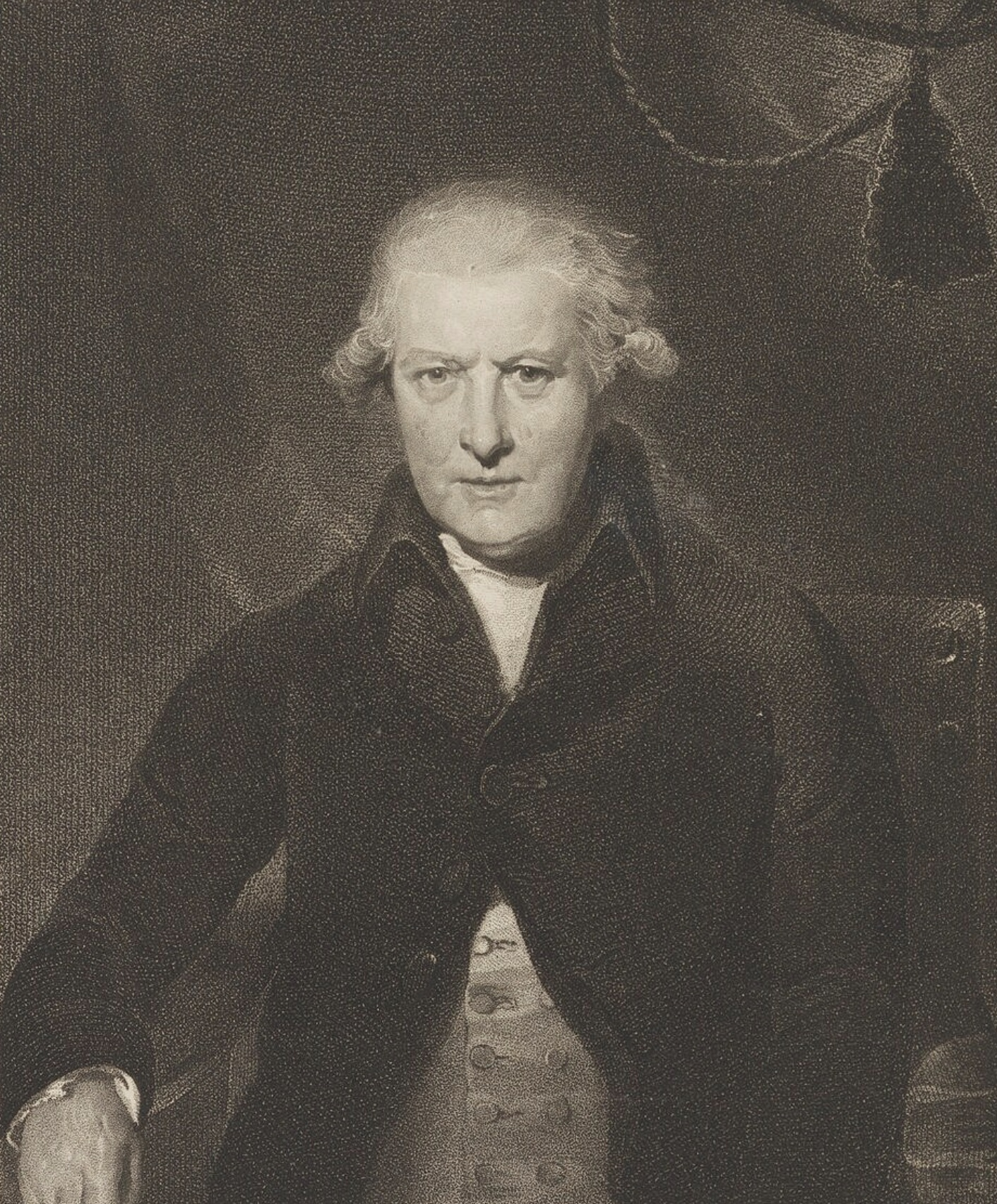
Viscount Barrington who, as Secretary at War, anticipated the riots and pre-positioned troops to deal with them

The 1766 food riots took place across England in response to rises in the prices of wheat and other cereals following a series of poor harvests. Riots were sparked by the first large-scale exports of grain in August and peaked in September - October. Around 131 riots were recorded, though many were relatively non-violent. In many cases traders and farmers were forced by the rioters to sell their wares at lower rates. In some instances, violence occurred with shops and warehouses looted and mills destroyed. There were riots in many towns and villages across the country but particularly in the South West and the Midlands, which included the Nottingham cheese riot.

The Whig government of the Marquess of Rockingham implemented tax cuts on imported grain and prohibited exports in an attempt to lower the price of food. Rockingham's successor William Pitt the Elder went further, prohibiting the use of grains in distilling and suspending more import duties. The public responded to the riots by raising subscriptions to provide charitable relief. These were used mainly to subsidise food for the poor but some subscriptions sought to build public mills and granaries. The Secretary at War, Viscount Barrington, had anticipated trouble and positioned troops at key points across the country. These acted as a deterrent and to support local magistrates, who read the Riot Act seven times in 1766 to attempt to compel rioters to disperse. Eight people were shot dead in the course of quelling the riots.

The riots were largely over by October due to the effects of charitable relief and the use of military force. Hundreds of arrests were made with 59 convicted at special commissions of assize and 68 at the January 1767 court of quarter sessions. Many were sentenced to death at the assizes, but most of these sentences were commuted to penal transportation or the defendant pardoned; only eight men were hanged. Many of the following years also experienced poor harvests and further rioting occurred, though on a much reduced scale.

== Background ==
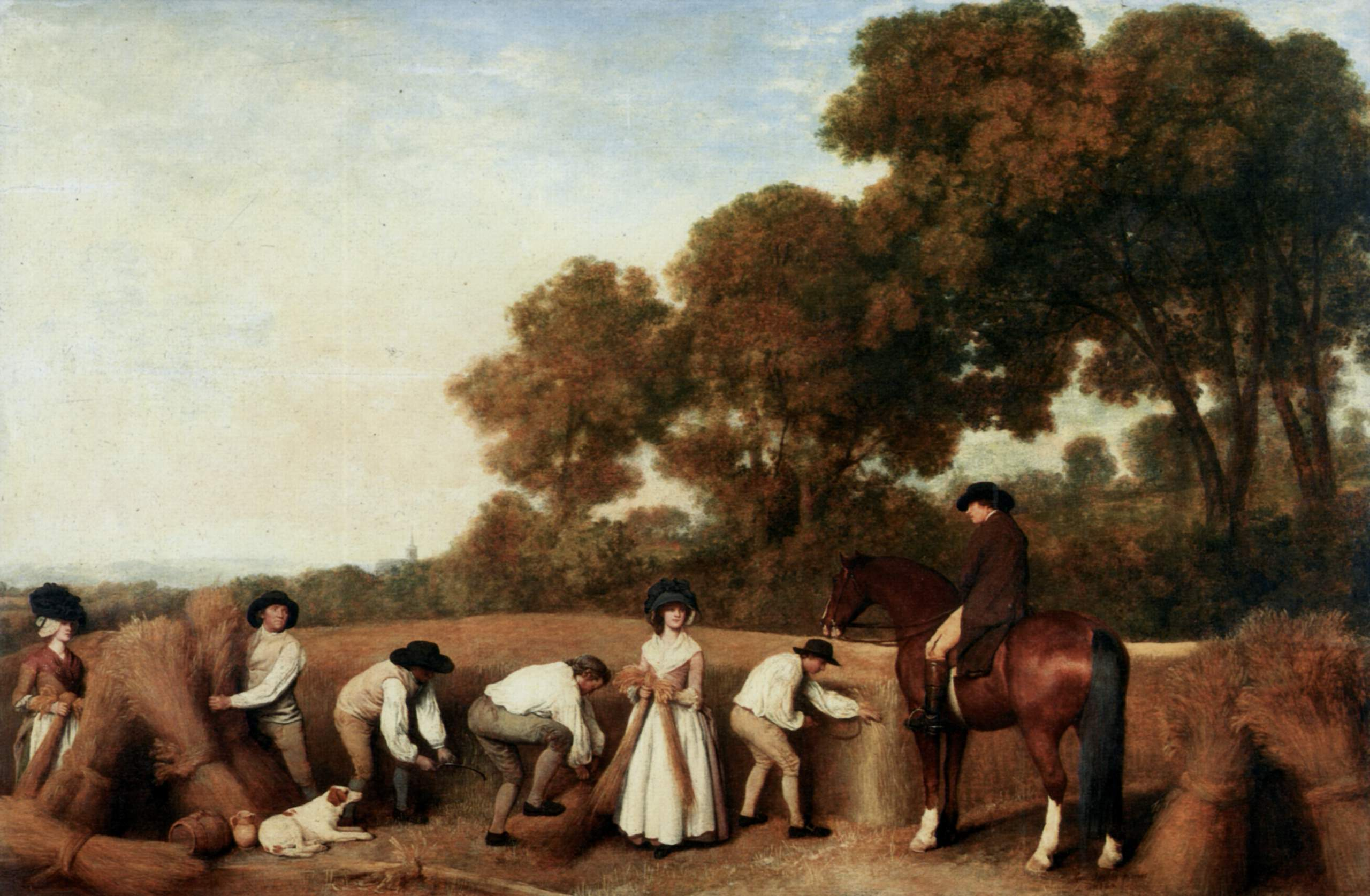
A 1785 depiction of an English grain harvest. Painting by George Stubbs titled Reapers

Bread was a key foodstuff in 18th-century England; the main cereals used for bread flour were rye and wheat, south of the River Trent, and oats north of it. Riots over the supply of food were relatively common in the 18th century, with at least 12 major outbreaks. Prior to 1766 the last major riots were in 1756–57, during which food stores and shipments were looted. Throughout this period the price of wheat remained relatively stable at £1 14s 11d (equivalent to £272 in 2025) per 0.25 long hundredweight (13 kg). The government attempted, to some effect, to keep prices affordable after the 1757 riots and until 1759 passed acts to regulate grain prices. They also sought to maintain the quantity of supply by prohibitions on the export of grain (lifted on 25 March 1759) and on the use of corn and flour in distilling (lifted on 21 April 1760).

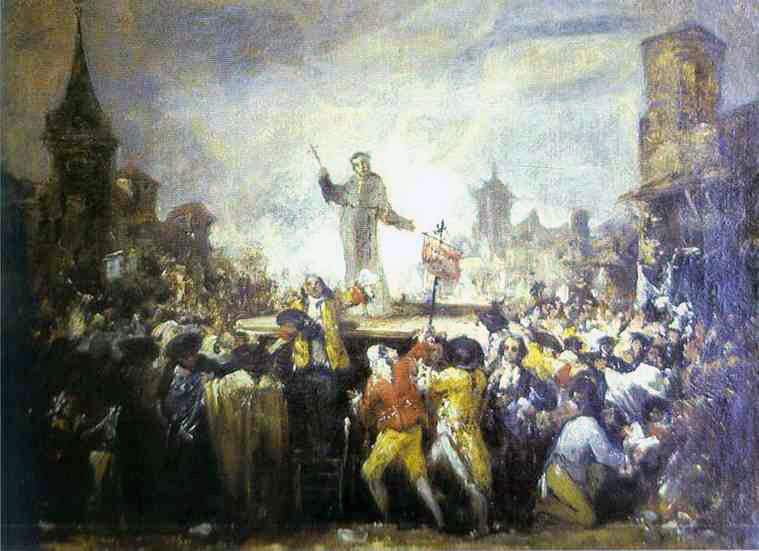
A depiction of a gathering during the Esquilache Riots

Grain harvests were poor each year from 1763 and prices rose again from 1764, reaching around £2 15s (equivalent to £427 in 2025) per 0.25 long hundredweight (13 kg) by 1766. The government again intervened, removing the duty payable on imported wheat and flour and the bounties it paid for exported wheat. In March 1766 the Esquilache Riots broke out in Madrid, Spain, partly caused by high grain prices and market liberalisation.

== Riots ==
The riots of 1766 were sparked by the first large-scale exports of harvested grain in August. Over the following 12 weeks there were more than 60 incidents of rioting across the country and the Annual Register described 30 riots in September by "the poor; who have been driven to desperation and madness, by the exorbitant prices of all manner of provisions". By the year's end some 131 incidents would be recorded. The riots of 1766 showed a movement away from attacks on food stores and shipments in cities to marching on farms in the countryside, particularly those known to be involved in the export trade. In many cases self-restraint was shown by rioters but in other instances attacks on shops and warehouses were made and some mills and their machinery were destroyed. Many of the riots started as attempts to force traders to sell foodstuffs at lower prices, though some deteriorated into violence and property damage. Of the 131 recorded riots, traders were forced to sell their products at lower prices on 39 occasions and goods were seized in 31 cases; in 14 incidents both actions were taken. Some 46 of the riots began as attempts to enforce market regulation rules.

=== South West ===
The South West saw a number of disturbances, with weavers often implicated. In Exeter, Devon, a mob, objecting to wheat priced at 9s 6d (equivalent to £72 in 2025) per 1 imperial bushel (36 L), seized cheese from a warehouse. At Honiton local lace-workers seized corn from farmers, transported it to market, sold it at a lower than market price and gave the money and empty sacks to the farmers. Elsewhere in the county violence flared and mills, valued at £1,000, were burnt down. In Gloucestershire the wool workers from the Stroudwater Navigation area were said to make up the core of the rioters. A large expedition roamed the countryside around Cirencester, seizing and foraging for food and there were riots in Tetbury in October. At Beckington, Somerset, a mill was burnt down and two rioters shot by the miller.

=== Midlands ===
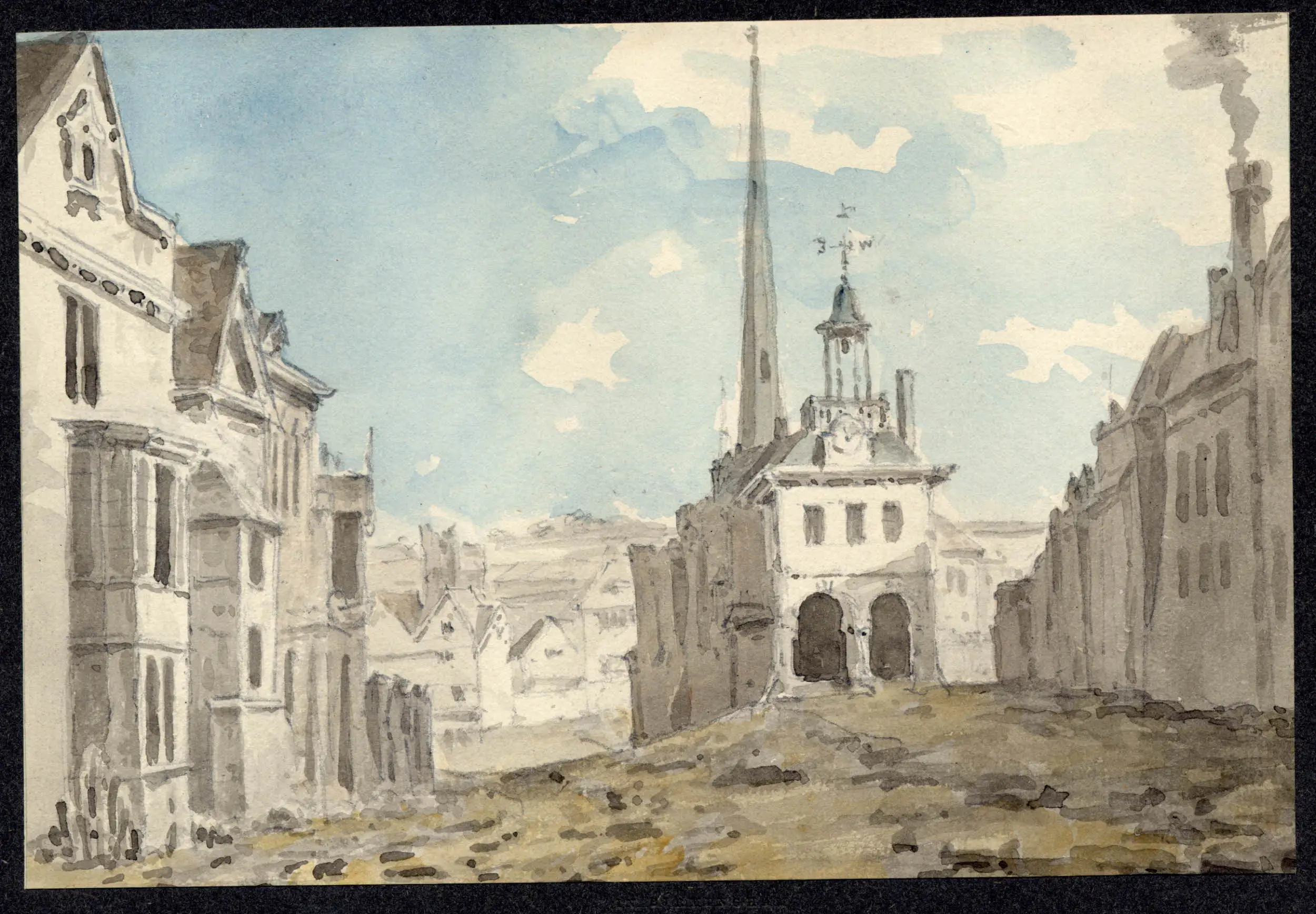
A near-contemporary depiction of Birmingham's Bull Ring

In the Midlands there were riots in and around Birmingham and the Black Country but disturbances also occurred in the East Midlands at Ashby-de-la-Zouch and Derby, where warehouses were looted. The 2 October Nottingham cheese riot saw thousands of pounds of cheese seized by rioters. Riots in Birmingham began in September; butter at the market on sale for 10 pence (equivalent to £6 in 2025) per 1 pound (450 g) was seized and sold for 7 pence (equivalent to £5 in 2025). At the Michaelmas fair a common labourer, possibly a Dudley miner, erected a mop as a standard and called for a "redress of grievances" to take place. Parties of men afterwards accosted traders at the fair and forced them to sell bread and cheese at lower rates. Order was restored by magistrate John Wyrley Birch and 80 special constables, armed with staffs, and the threat of military intervention. The rioters stood down after receiving agreement that bakers would provide bread at the rate of one penny (equivalent to £1 in 2025) per 1 pound (450 g). Similar actions took place across the Black Country where parties of miners and nail makers also attacked millers, maltsers, butchers and bakers.

In October, rioters from Birmingham accosted wagons at Stratford upon Avon, seizing wheat and selling it at a reduced rate. Later that month a party of Black Country miners led by "Irish Tom" and "Barley Will" and accompanied by nail makers and spinners travelled to Birmingham. Reaching the Bull Ring (where the town's markets were traditionally held) at 4 pm on 17 October they negotiated with local leaders to fix prices of malt, flour, cheese, butter and other foodstuffs before withdrawing. Local residents met afterwards and agreed to raise a party of 140 special constables to prevent any further disorder but also agreed to pay to subsidise the price of bread.

=== Elsewhere ===
In East Anglia, many of the rioters were weavers. A riot at Norwich in September was described as a "general insurrection". Rioters threatened to burn down the mayor's house but order was restored after two of their number were sentenced to death and the towns people raised £20,000 to fund subsidised food for the poor. In October, riots broke out at Ipswich and Burnham Market.

The remainder of the country was less troubled. In Berkshire, mills worth around £1,000 were destroyed and in October there were riots at St Albans (Hertfordshire), Aylesbury (Buckinghamshire), Scarborough (North Yorkshire) and Leeds (West Yorkshire).

== Response ==
=== Tax relief ===
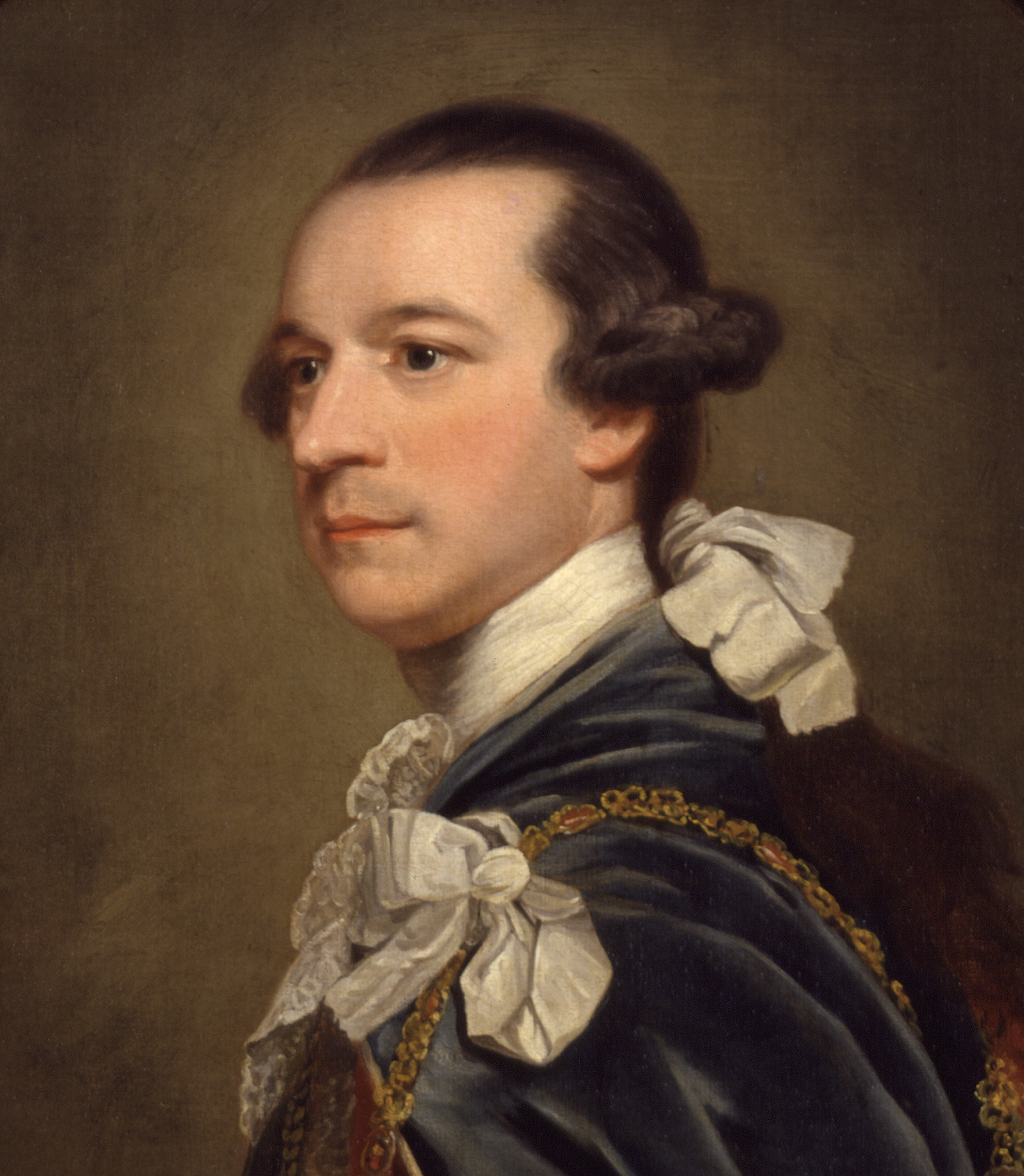
The Marquess of Rockingham

The British government, under the Marquess of Rockingham attempted to reduce food prices in early 1766 by means of three acts that removed import duty on grain from the Thirteen Colonies (until 29 September); removed duties on oats (until 29 September) and prohibited the export of grain and flour (until 26 August). A parliamentary committee was set up to investigate the corn trade which recommended that farmers should be permitted to sell direct to consumers to cut out middlemen. Rockingham's successor William Pitt the Elder, implemented further measures in late 1766. The use of wheat and flour for distilling was prohibited from 14 November 1766 until 10 September 1767. Pitt also suspended the duty on wheat and flour, barley and barley meal, oats and oatmeal, rye and rye meal and pulses until September 1767.

=== Charity ===
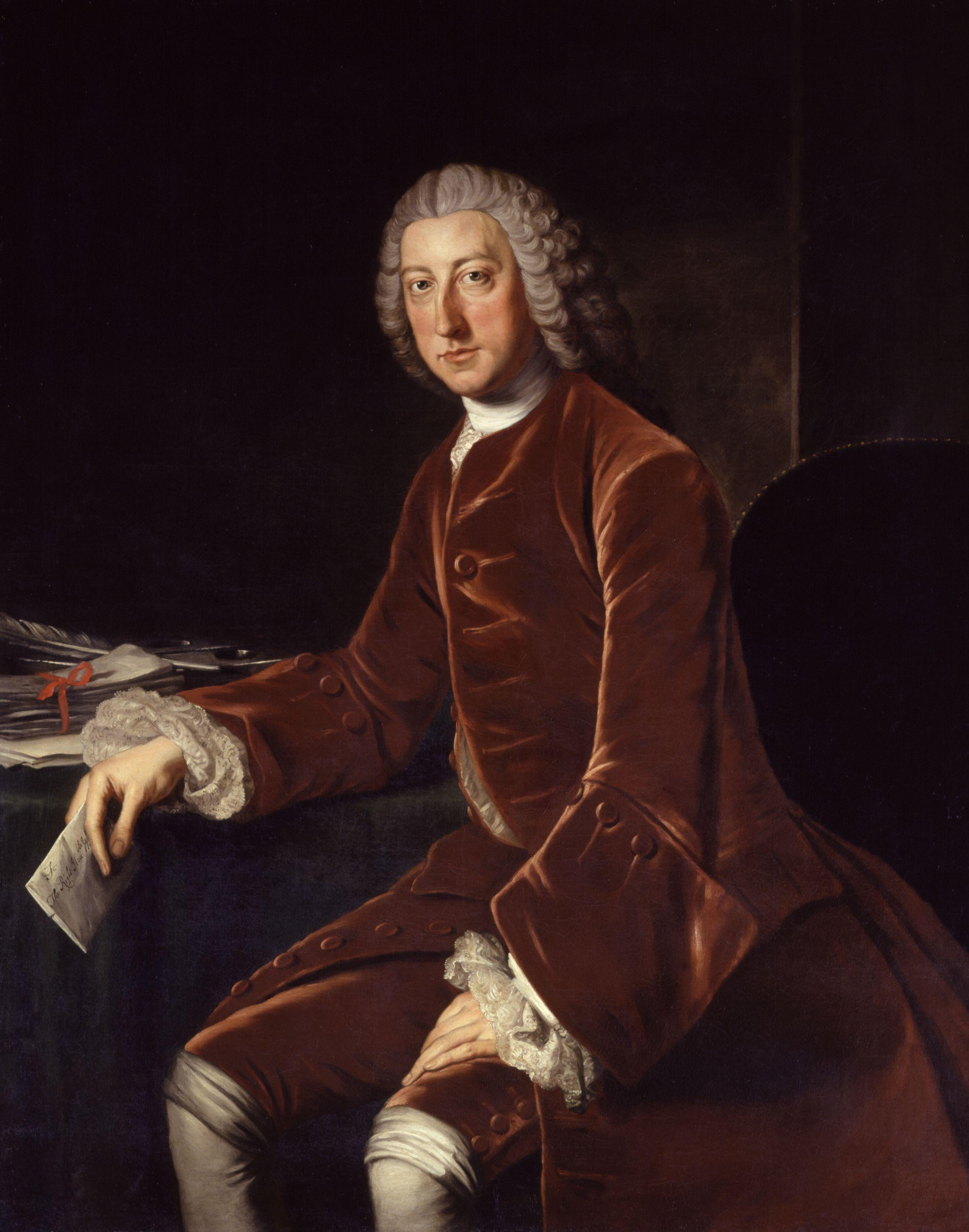
Pitt the Elder

The 1766 riots saw a greater number of public subscriptions for charitable relief than had happened in previous food riots. Subscriptions took place amid unrest at Birmingham, Cheltenham, Great Yarmouth, Newbury, Reading, Steeple Ashton, Abingdon, Barnstaple, Chippenham, Exeter, Ipswich, Norwich, Gloucester, Exeter, Oxford, Salisbury and Wootton Bassett but also at Ashburton, Buckingham, Cirencester, Devizes, High Wycombe, King's Lynn, Northampton, Wallingford, and Woodstock where there was no trouble. Local members of parliament (MPs), or those seeking election, were often leading contributors; MPs in Bath contributed £200 and those in Wells £150. Robert Palk donated £50 in Ashburton and Matthew Wyldbore supplied free coal to residents in Peterborough, outdoing the sitting MPs who donated £100, both were elected to these constituencies in 1767. Local gentry were also prominent with Pitt (the Earl of Chatham) subsidising wheat at Urchfont, Lord Bathurst at Cirencester, Lord Weymouth at Warminster and Earl Fortescue at South Molton, probably helping to stave off unrest in those places.

Some of the subscriptions subsidised foodstuffs such as flour, bread and rice or arranged to import it from abroad. Other subscriptions took more practical measures, in Stroud and Durseley low-cost wheat was supplied to bakers to allow them to sell cheaper bread. At Lyme, millers allowed their machinery to be used at no cost to grind flour and a subscription in Wolverhampton proposed funding a publicly-owned mill. Public granaries were constructed in Cheshire and Shropshire.

The subscription funds probably pacified the rioters better than a military intervention could have. In some cases, a link was made explicit; at Ipswich funds were provided to the poor on the condition that relief would cease if rioting started in the area. The riots may have led to a rise in philanthropic spending generally, with four charitably-funded infirmaries opened in the following years.

=== Law enforcement ===
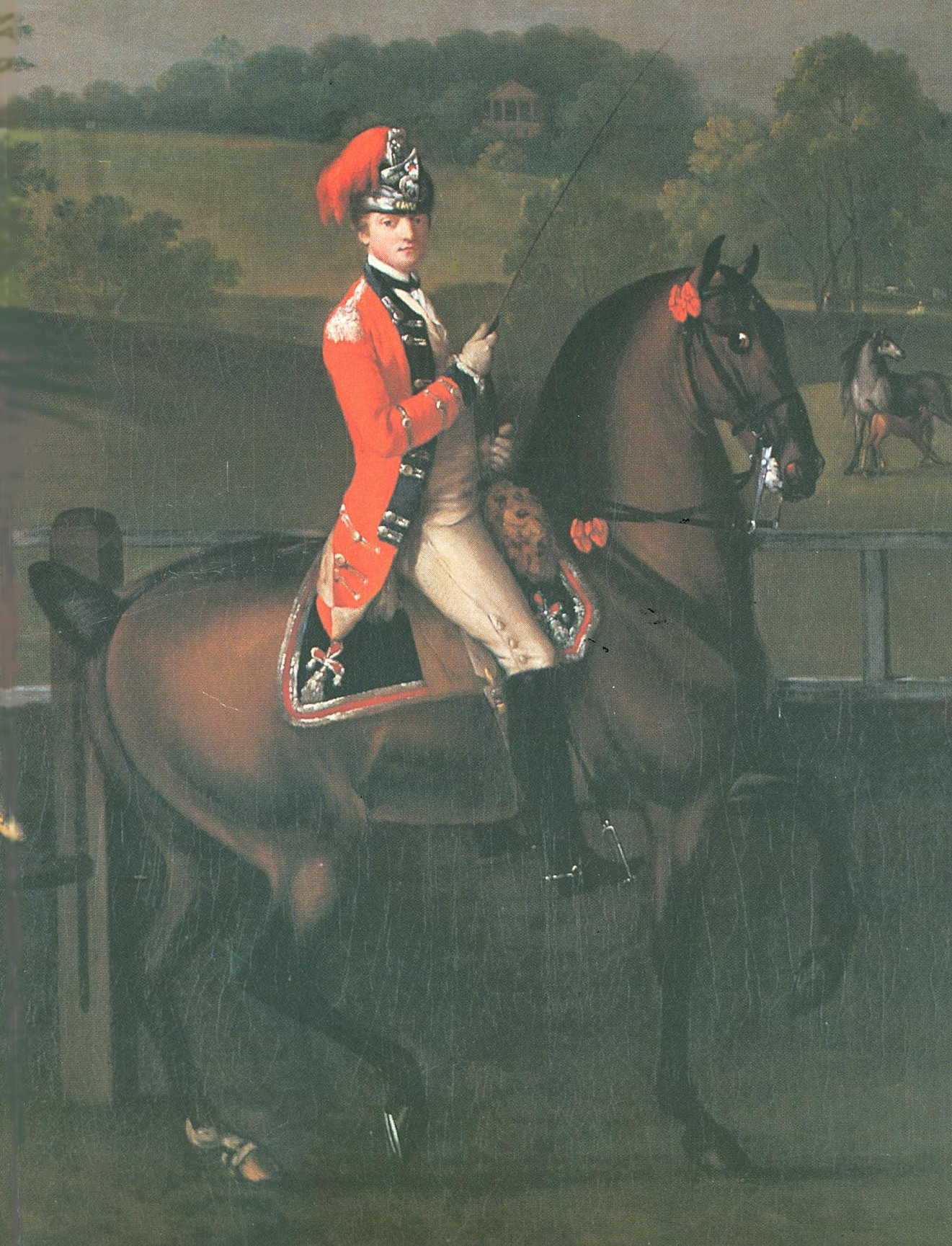
A depiction of an officer of the 15th Light Dragoons (circa 1768) who were involved in suppressing the Nottingham Cheese Riot

The Secretary at War, Viscount Barrington anticipated the difficulties of 1766 in the preceding year. In January 1766, he dispatched a number of cavalry and infantry units to known trouble spots and ordered them to be ready to intervene at the direction of local magistrates should riots erupt. Barrington had large numbers of troops available as the country was at peace, unlike during the riots of 1756-7 which had occurred during the Seven Years' War. When the rioting began in September Barrington deployed more troops, even where requests had not been received from magistrates.

Barrington billeted his troops together; this meant that they were sometimes unable to respond quickly to remote uprisings (sometimes mobs roamed the countryside for several days) but prevented individual units from being overwhelmed by numbers. As the West Country emerged as an epicentre of unrest, Barrington established a military district, commanding nine cavalry troops and sixteen infantry companies, to coordinate efforts. In spite of the relatively wide unrest the Riot Act only had to be read seven times, though on occasions when it was read without troops on hand it proved ineffective at restoring order. Rioting largely ceased by October partly due to the effective response of the military and partly due to government tax relief and the charitable activities. While suppressing unrest some eight rioters were shot dead by the military.

To try the large number of people arrested during the riots special commissions of assize were held in Berkshire, Wiltshire, Gloucestershire and Norfolk. Of the 204 people arrested for rioting some 108 were brought to trial, of which 59 were convicted. The rate of conviction was affected by a decision to release many of the prisoners awaiting trial at Gloucester Castle after an outbreak in the jail. Many of those convicted were sentenced to death, but most of these sentences were later reduced to penal transportation at the behest of Pitt the Elder, who advocated for their transportation to Florida instead, or were pardoned completely. Seven hangings were carried out in Reading, Salisbury and Gloucester in January 1767 with a further man hanged later that year. Other rioters were tried at the January 1767 court of quarter sessions, which saw 29 defendants sentenced to transportation to America, 30 imprisoned and 3 sentenced to flogging. Six defendants were convicted but received pardons, including two pregnant women.

== Aftermath ==
England suffered another poor harvest in 1767, causing a scarcity of flour. Parliament acted by again lifting duties on imported corn, banning the use of grain in distilleries and allowing duty-free imports of barley, pulse, wheat, oats and rye. The harvests were better in 1768 and 1769 but were poor in 1770-74 and food riots, on a much reduced scale, occurred every year until 1773. Despite wheat prices rising to 14s. 10d. (equivalent to £48 in 2025) per bushel (27.2 kilograms (60 lb)) by 1800 riots became increasingly rare and more localised in England.

John Bohstedt, a professor at the University of Tennessee in Knoxville, who is the author of the 2016 book, Riots and Community Politics in England and Wales, 1790-1810, and the 2010 book, The Politics of Provisions: Food Riots, Moral Economy, and Market Transition in England, C. 1550-1850, builds on the work of E.P. Thompson, specifically his 1971 essay on the 'moral economy' with more recent studies in the history of economics. Bohstedt described the 1766 food riots as "quite restrained".

Walter Shelton (1973), considered them the most serious of the 18th century, though a reviewer of his work considered those of 1756-57 were almost certainly on an equal level and possibly those of 1740 were as well.
