= Nottingham Goose Fair =

Travelling amusement fair in Nottingham, England

Coordinates: 52°57′54″N 1°09′36″W

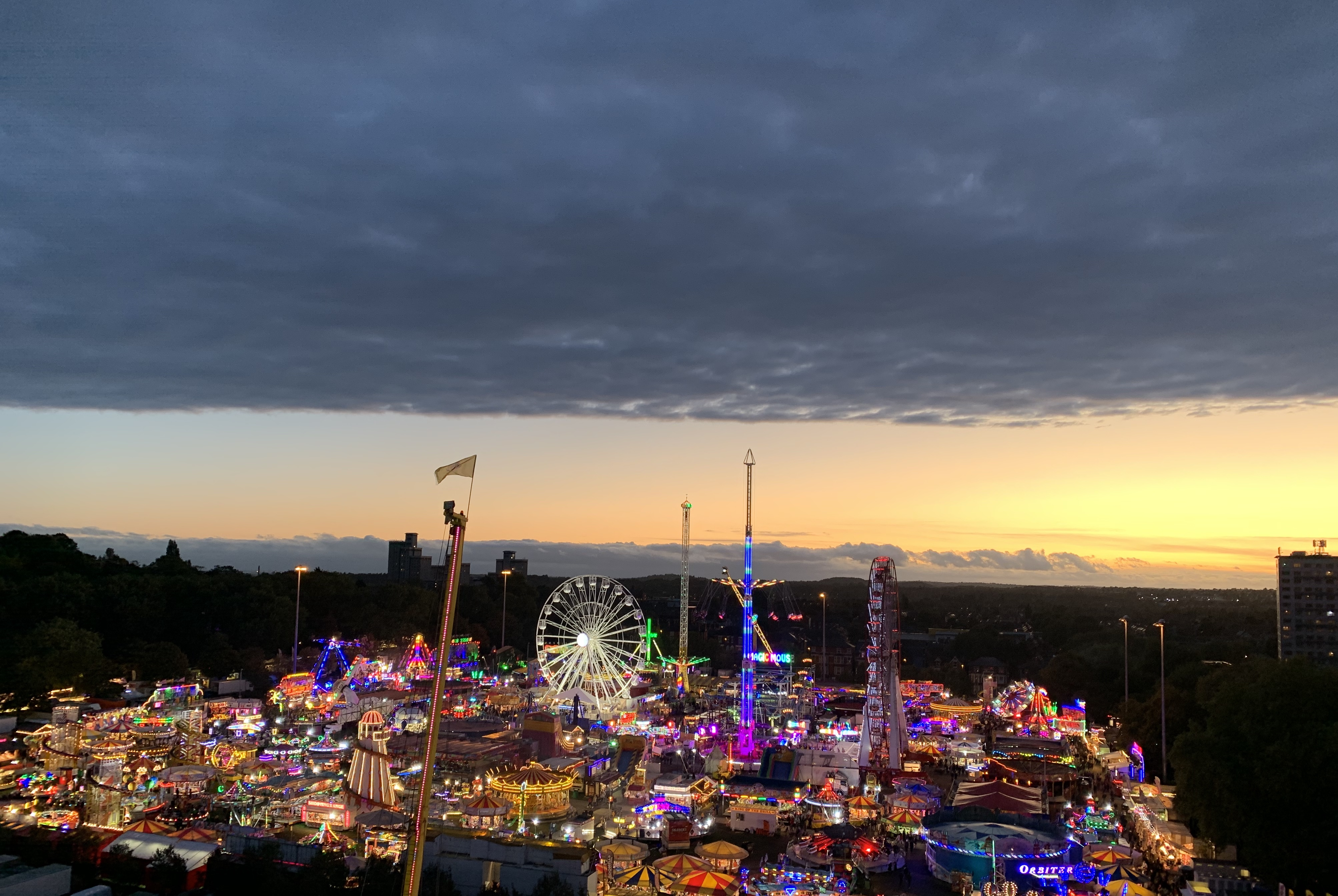
- Aerial view of the Goose Fair
- Genre: Fairground, funfair
- Frequency: Annual
- Locations: Forest Recreation Ground, Nottingham, United Kingdom
- Years active: 741–742 years
- Inaugurated: 1284 (Royal Charter)
- Most recent: 25 September 2026 – 4 October 2026
- Next event: 2027
- Attendance: 493,200 (in 2024)
- Capacity: Unlimited (at police discretion)
- Patron: Queen Camilla
- Organiser: Nottingham City Council

The Nottingham Goose Fair is an annual travelling funfair held at the Forest Recreation Ground in Nottingham, England, during the first week of October. Largely provided by travelling showmen, it is one of four established fairs in the United Kingdom to carry the name, the others being the smaller Goosey Fair in Tavistock, Devon, the Michaelmas Goose Fayre in Colyford, East Devon, and the Ovingham Goose Fair. In recent years, there have been more than 400,000 visitors to Nottingham's fair annually.

Now known for its fairground rides and attractions, Goose Fair started as a livestock and trade event, with a reputation for its excellent cheese. The name "Goose Fair" is derived from the thousands of geese that were driven from the Lincolnshire fens in the East of England to be sold in Nottingham at the fair each year.

In 1284, a royal charter was granted by King Edward I that referred to city fairs in Nottingham, although it is thought that a fair was already established in the city before then. Goose Fair was originally held for eight days starting on 21 September, but was moved to early October in 1752, when the Gregorian calendar was first adopted in Britain. For centuries, the fair was held in Nottingham's Old Market Square in the city centre, until it was moved to the Forest Recreation Ground in 1928, due to space limitations and planned redevelopment of the market square.

Goose Fair was cancelled in 1646 after an outbreak of the bubonic plague, and again during the two World Wars of the 20th century. The fair was not held in 2020 because of the COVID-19 pandemic, and it was cancelled in 2021 for the second year running, after plans for an entrance fee and perimeter fencing were rejected by the organisers. For 2022, as of March, negotiations were underway to extend the fair's normal five-day duration to ten days.

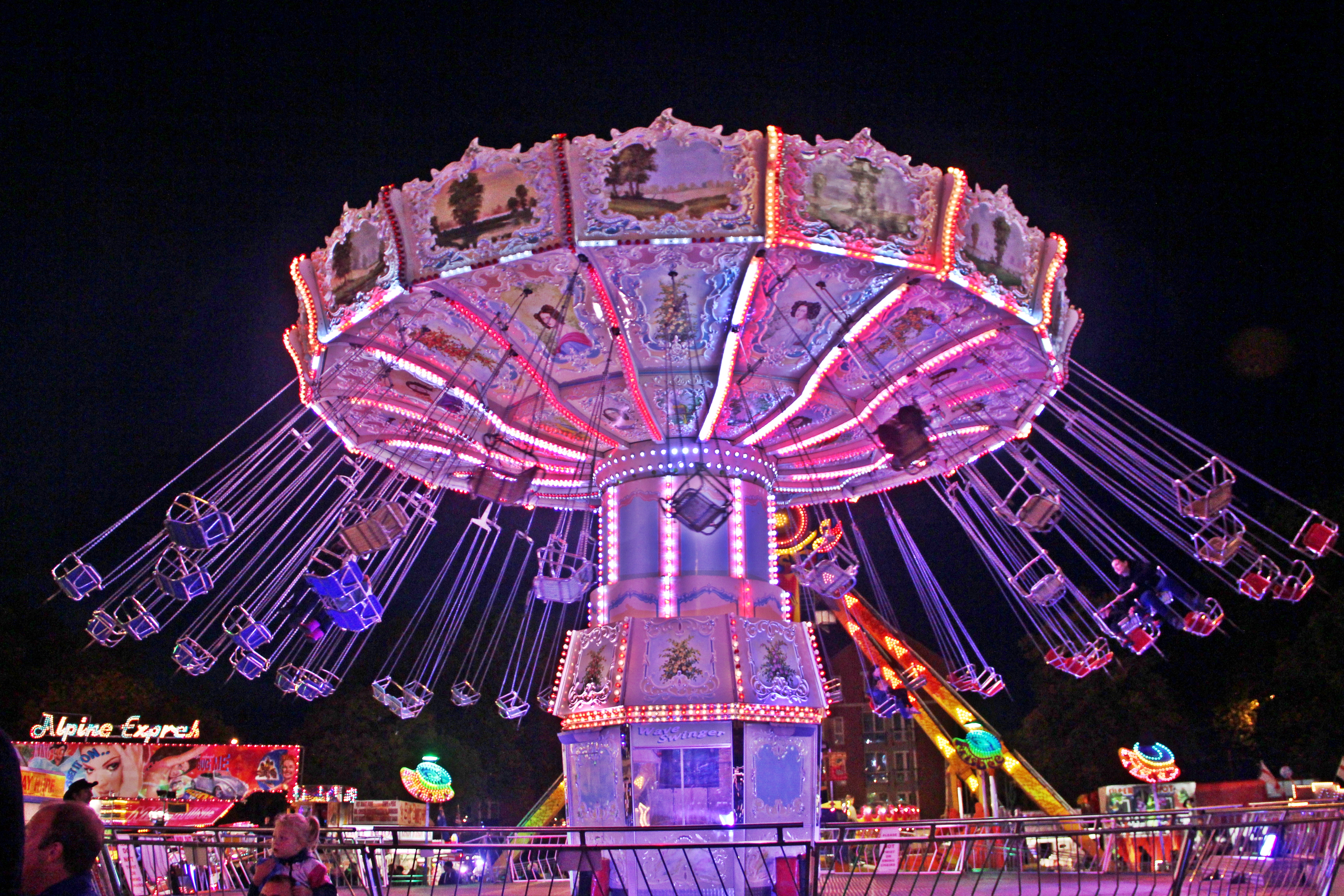
Goose Fair's spinning swing carousel, illuminated at night in 2012

== History ==
=== Early history ===
It is not known exactly how long a fair has existed in Nottingham, but it has certainly been around for many centuries and may date back more than a thousand years. The earliest reference to a "St Mathew's Fair" in Nottingham, held on 21 September, comes from Saxon times. It is also known that the Danes had a settlement in Nottingham, and they most likely established a market, which may have included a primitive fair.

The creation of commercial fairs by royal charter was widespread in the twelfth and thirteenth centuries. In 1164, a charter was granted by King Henry II to Lenton Priory, near Nottingham, to hold an annual Martinmas Fair starting on 11 November. The royal charter meant that this fair took priority over any other fairs in the Nottingham district, which were forbidden for the duration of the Lenton fair. Then in 1284, King Edward I granted a charter for a separate fair to be held in Nottingham on St. Matthew's Day, although it is clear that a fair had already been established in Nottingham by the time the charter was granted. Nottingham's fair flourished in Tudor times, because the 1284 charter released it from the restrictions and competition of the nearby Lenton fair.

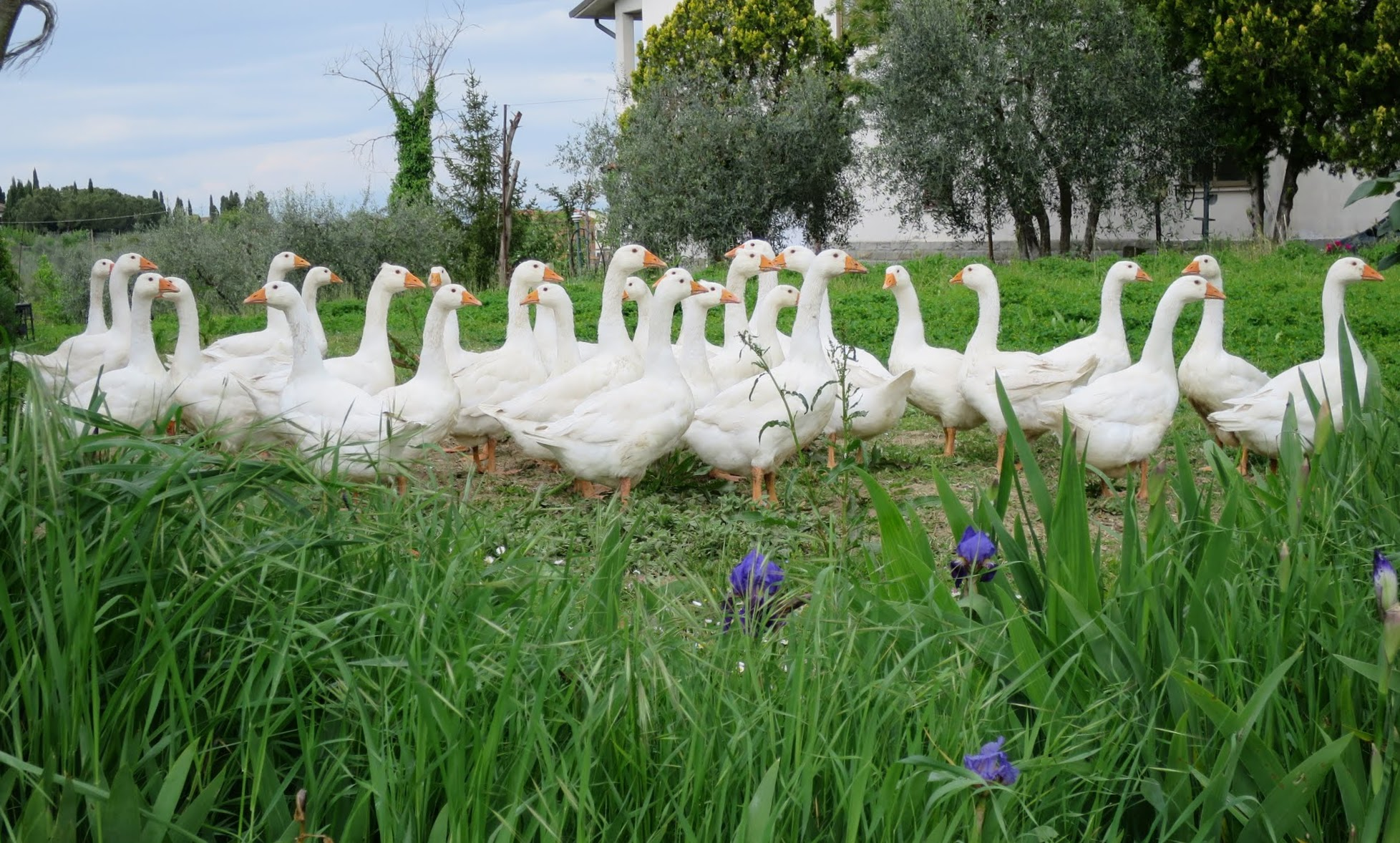
Hundreds of geese were driven from the Lincolnshire fens to be sold at the goose fair in Nottingham's Old Market Square.

The first reference to the name "Goose Fair" can be found in the Nottingham Borough Records of 1541, where 21 September is referred to as "Goose Fair Day". The name comes from the hundreds of geese that were driven on foot from Lincolnshire, Cambridgeshire and Norfolk to be sold in Nottingham. The birds' feet were coated with a mixture of tar and sand to protect them on the long journey of fifty miles or more. It is recorded that up to 20,000 geese were driven up through Hockley and along "Goose Gate" into Nottingham's Old Market Square, where the fair was held annually for hundreds of years. The geese were sold in Nottingham to provide the traditional Michaelmas dish of roast goose; geese that had hatched in the spring were ready for the table by the end of September. Michaelmas was celebrated on 29 September to mark the end of the harvest season.

In 1752, the fair was moved back from St Matthew's Day (21 September) to the first week in October because of a revision to the British calendar. On that year, eleven days (3‍–‍13 September) were omitted altogether from the calendar so that Britain could finally adopt the Gregorian calendar (following the Calendar (New Style) Act 1750) to align with the rest of western Europe. Hence, the start of Goose Fair was shifted to 2 October and has remained on or around that date ever since.

Goose Fair began as a trade event and, besides the sale of geese and other livestock, it became particularly famous for its high-quality cheese. In 1766, there was a cheese riot that was triggered by a sharp increase in the price of cheese compared with the previous year. The riot culminated in the mayor being toppled by a large cheese.

From an early date, side shows were added to entertain the crowds, and eventually the trade element diminished as transport links improved and annual fairs were no longer essential for stocking up on items from travelling merchants. Fairground rides started to take over, and by the end of the 19th century Goose Fair included various gondola rides and gallopers, switchback horses, a tunnel railway, bikes, yachts, and animal side shows. The fair gradually spread out into the streets surrounding the Old Market Square, which led to increased congestion, especially with the growth of traffic in the city. In 1928, the fair was relocated to the Forest Recreation Ground, having finally outgrown the city centre. The move was highly controversial at the time, but the concerns proved to be unfounded as the new site, which is more than twice the size of the market square, turned out to be an ideal alternative.

Nottingham's Goose Fair has not run continuously throughout its history. It was cancelled in 1646 because of the Great Plague, and again during World War I (1914‍–‍1918). Although officially cancelled for the duration of World War II (1939‍–‍1944), the fair was held for a week in July 1943 during daylight hours (due to the wartime blackout regulations), and another daylight-only Goose Fair was allowed in August 1944. The fair resumed on its traditional date of the first Thursday in October in 1945.

The length of the fair has varied over the years; originally eight days long, the fair was shortened to three days in the late 19th century, but was increased again to four days after the turn of the 20th century.

=== After World War II ===
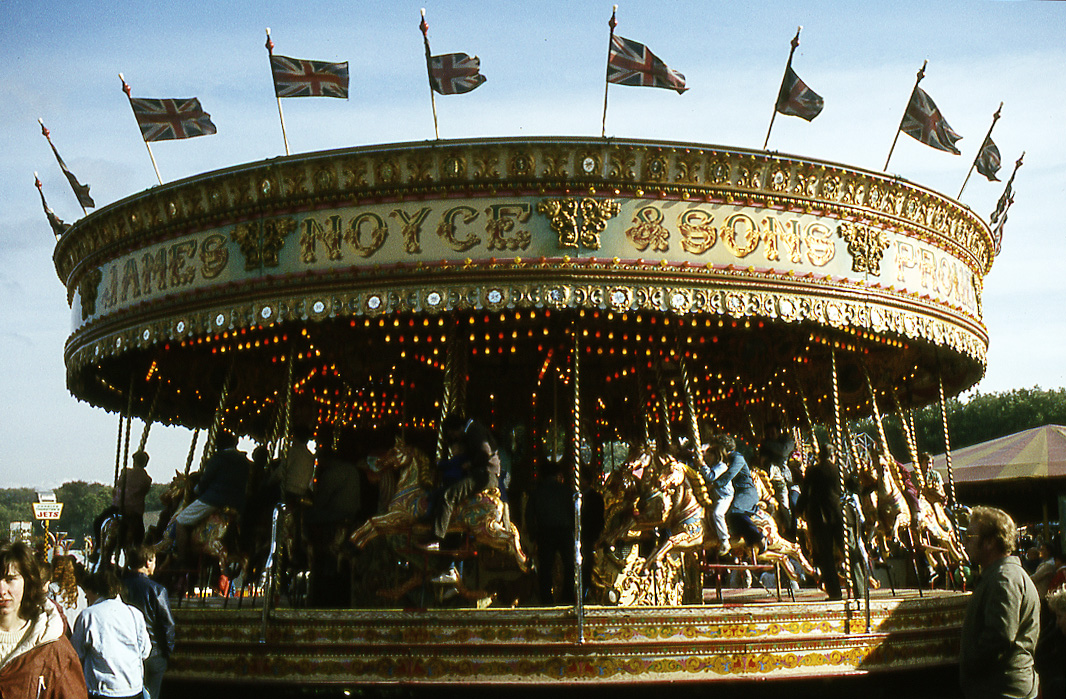
A traditional carousel (or galloper) photographed at Goose Fair in 1983

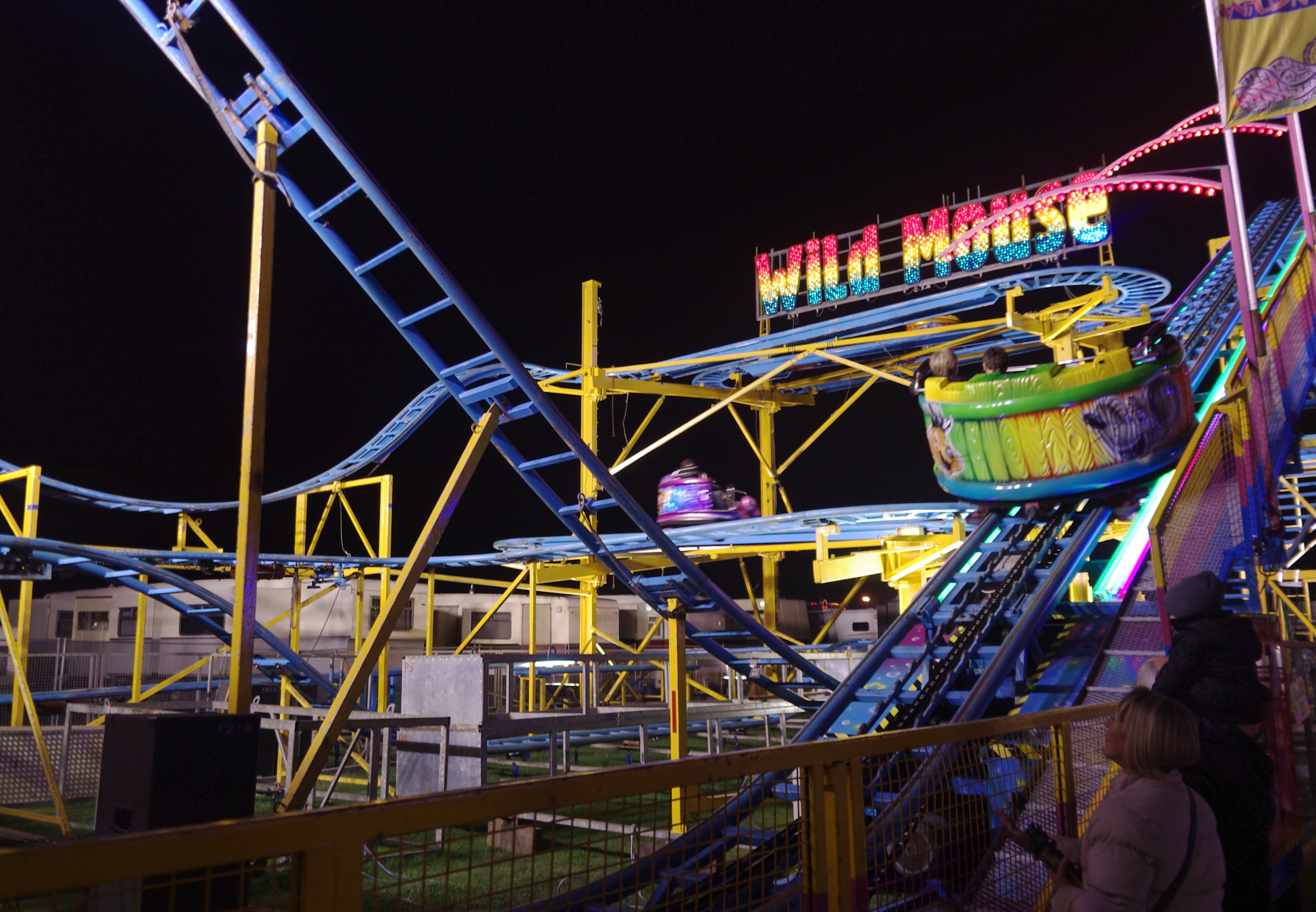
The Wild Mouse roller coaster at Nottingham's Goose Fair in 2010

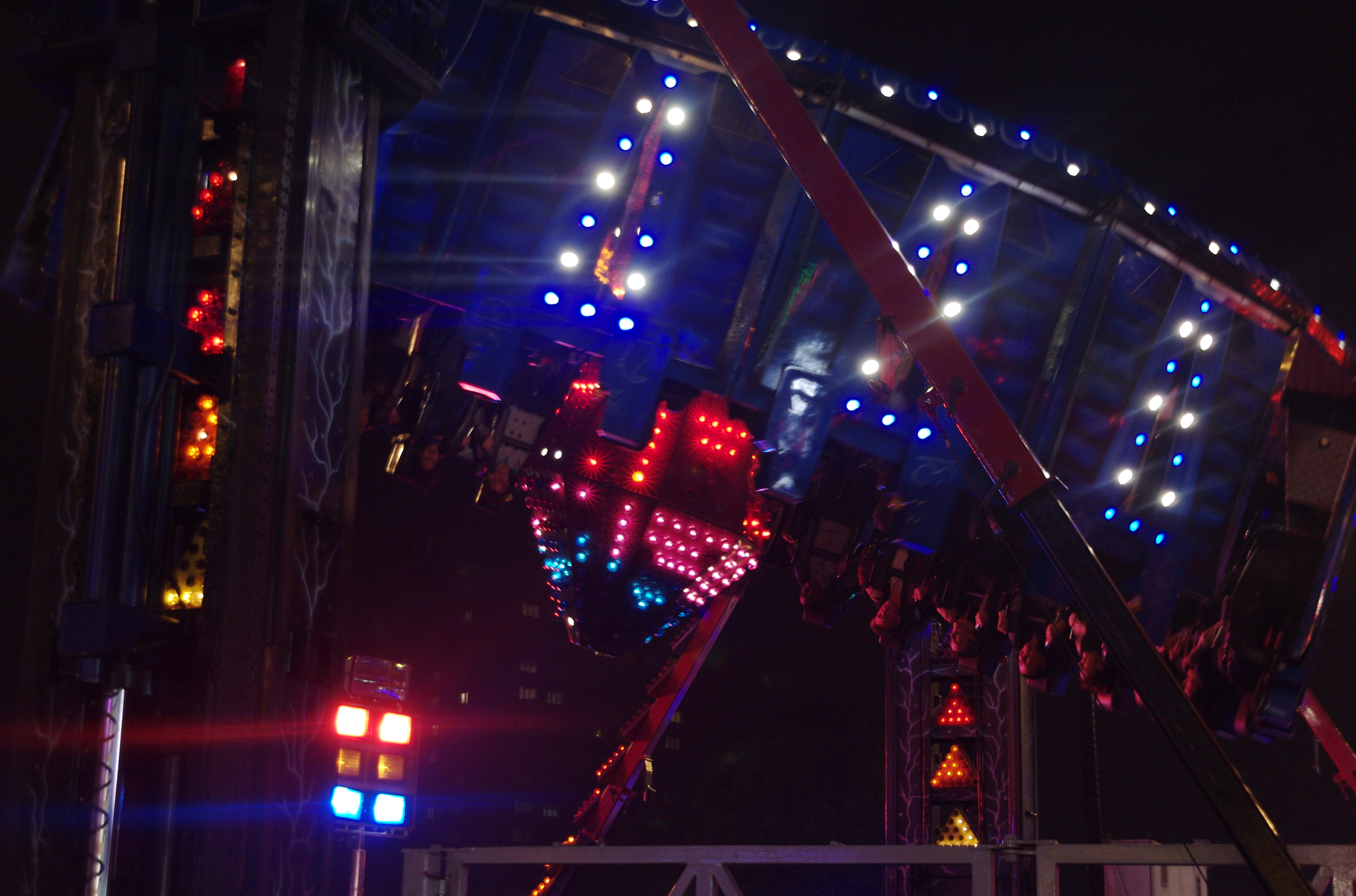
Spinning drum ride ("XLR8") photographed at Goose Fair in 2010

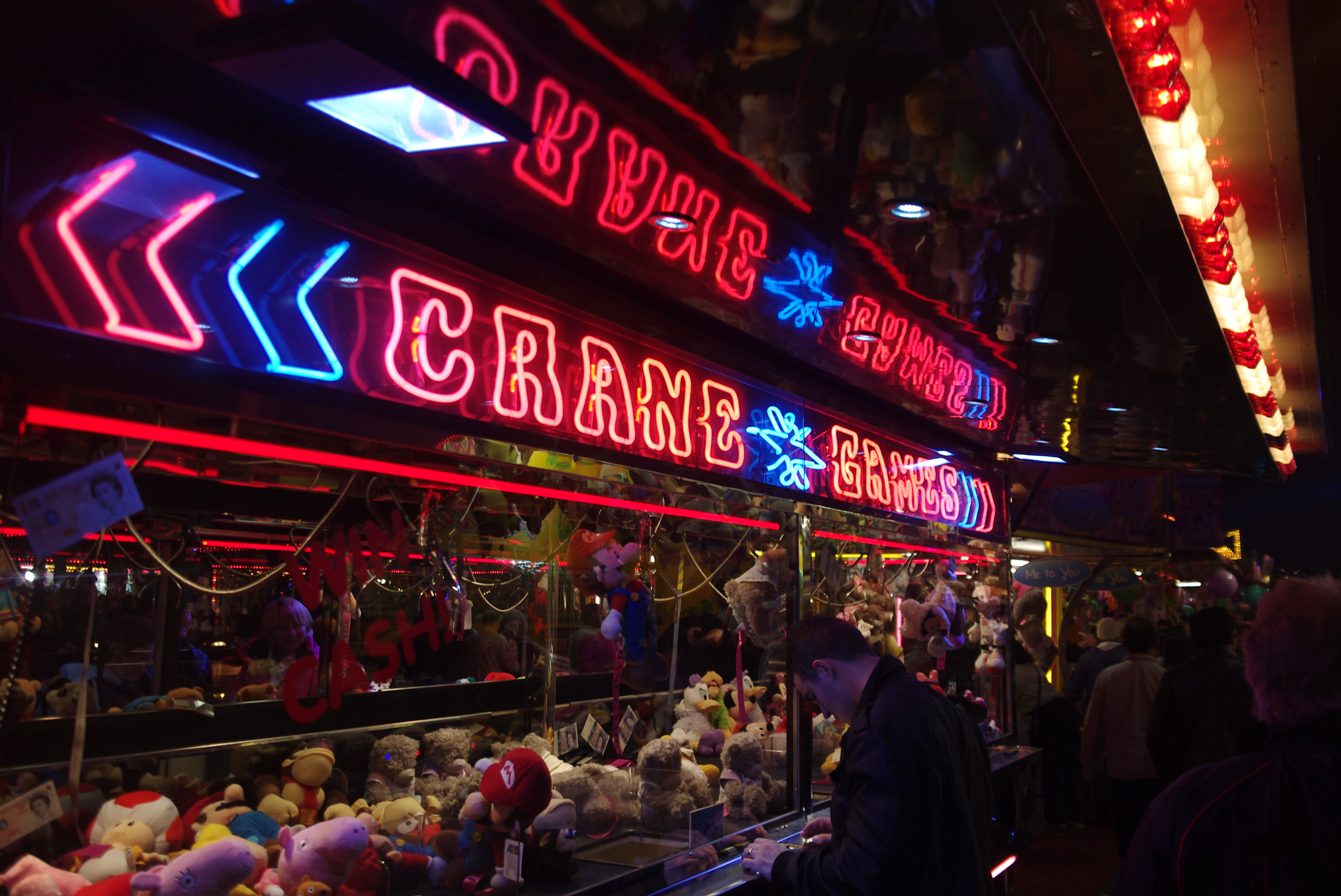
Crane games at Nottingham's Goose Fair in 2010

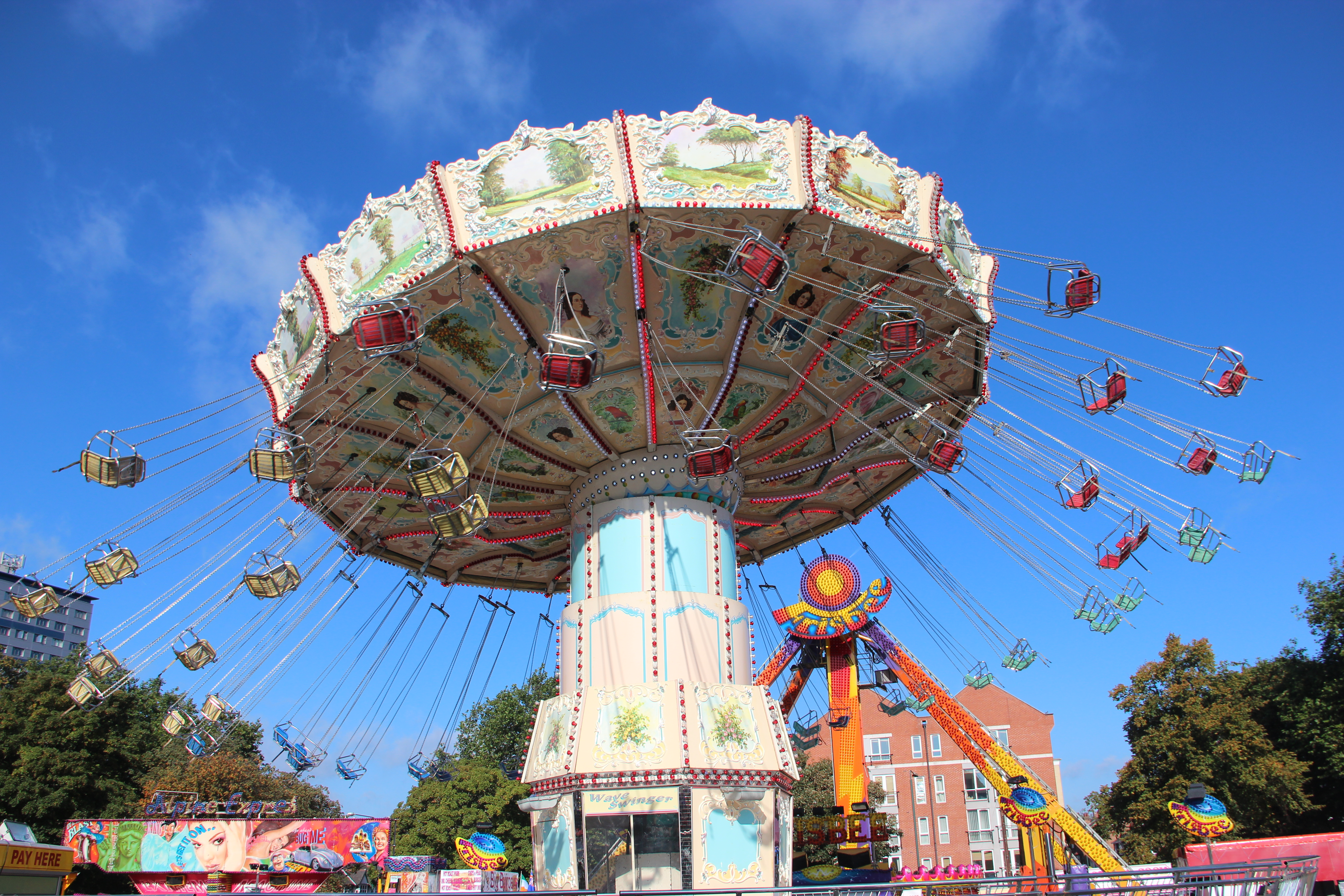
Goose Fair's spinning swing carousel, pictured in 2012

Goose Fair is held annually at the Forest Recreation Ground, which is about a mile north of Nottingham city centre. It takes over all of the grassy area of the recreation ground as well as half of the car park. A large area adjacent to the fairground is used as a temporary encampment for the show travellers to inhabit for the duration of the fair.

Special road systems take effect during the Goose Fair to allow the additional traffic to flow more easily. To prevent traffic congestion, parking is restricted in the local area, and no loading is allowed on local streets. The use of public transport is encouraged; there are regular trams to the Forest Recreation Ground and buses to the nearby Mansfield Road and Sherwood Rise.

The official countdown to Goose Fair is marked by the appearance of "Goosey", the fair's giant goose mascot. In the run-up to the fair, the 2-metre-high fibreglass and timber statue is installed on a roundabout on Mansfield Road, adjacent to the Forest Recreation Ground. This annual tradition started in the 1960s. The fair is officially opened each year with a ceremonial ringing of a pair of silver bells by the Lord Mayor of Nottingham.

Goose Fair has opened for four days over most of its recent history, but it was permanently extended from four to five days in 2009. The date of Nottingham's fair has created a problem in recent years, as it overlaps with the Hull Fair. Some of the top rides from the Goose Fair have therefore to travel directly from Nottingham to Hull, not opening at Hull until around the fourth day of the fair.

Goose Fair was not held in 2020 due to the COVID-19 pandemic; it was officially cancelled on 21 August 2020 amidst safety concerns. It was cancelled again in 2021 because of "ongoing concerns and uncertainty" over COVID-19 and that fewer than half of Nottingham's residents had been fully vaccinated. Earlier plans for an entrance fee and perimeter fencing to allow the fair to go ahead were scrapped after a backlash from organisers. 2022's event subsequently ran for twice the usual length, at ten days.

== 21st-century attractions ==
Almost half a million visitors visit Nottingham's Goose Fair annually. It is known for its fairground rides and games, with over five hundred attractions, some for thrill seekers and others that appeal to the whole family.

Rides for the more adventurous fair-goers include Speed XXL, a 3g spinning pendulum ride; XLR8, a 4g spinning drum ride; the Wild Mouse, a high-speed roller coaster with spinning carts; and the Reverse Bungee, an elasticated vertical catapult. Magic, a suspended modern-day version of the Waltzer, first appeared at Goose Fair in 2017, and a huge swinging/rotating disc ride called the Giant Frisbee was introduced the same year.

The many family attractions include traditional bumper cars, helter skelters, funhouses, ghost trains, teacups and waltzers. There are several family stalls (such as hook-a-duck) with prizes to be won, and a giant ferris wheel that provides an aerial view of the fair. Conventional fairground food and refreshments are also on sale throughout the fair, including hot dogs, candy floss, doughnuts and mushy peas with mint sauce.

== In art and popular culture ==
- Nottingham artist Noel Denholm Davis painted Nottingham Goose Fair in 1910; his painting is held at the Nottingham Castle Museum and Art Gallery. Another artist from Nottingham, Arthur Spooner, painted The Goose Fair, Nottingham in 1926. The painting was sold at Christie's in 2004 for over £200,000 and is also now displayed at Nottingham Castle.
- While living in London between 1908 and 1912, the writer D. H. Lawrence would return home to Nottingham every year to visit the Goose Fair. In 1910, he wrote a short story called "Goose Fair", which first appeared in The English Review in February 1910 and was included in his collection, The Prussian Officer and Other Stories, in 1914.
- In the novel Goose Fair, Cecil Roberts presents a derisive portrayal of the fair: "Every first Thursday in October, following the custom of centuries, the good people of the city whose Sheriff was so soundly abused by Robin Hood, take leave of their senses." Originally published in the United States in 1928, the novel was also published in England in the same year with the title David and Diana, the names of the book's main characters.
- English Journey by J. B. Priestley, published in 1934, chronicles the author's travels around England the previous year. It contains a particularly scathing account of his visit to Goose Fair, which he describes as a "crushing mass of gaping and sweating humanity" ... "contrived to attract the largest number of pennies in the shortest possible time."
- Goose Fair has been used in television programmes, as well as in films such as The Woman for Joe (1955), Saturday Night and Sunday Morning (1960) and Weekend (2011).
- The short story "Noah's Ark", written by Alan Sillitoe in 1991, is set in Nottingham's Goose Fair. and the fair features in "Saturday Night and Sunday Morning" by the same author
- Goose Fair Night is a 2016 collection of poems written by Kathy Pimlott, which contains the author's reflections on places in and around Nottingham, including the annual Goose Fair.
- The final movement of Symphony No. 2 "The Nottingham Symphony" by Alan Bush is titled "Goose Fair".
- The album cover for Neutral Milk Hotel's debut album On Avery Island features a coloured picture of the Goose fair taken in presumably 1910.
- The Cinema Museum in London holds film of Nottingham's Goose Fair from 1948.

== See also ==
- Bridgwater – has large annual funfair similar to Nottingham's Goose Fair
- Market town
- Peddler
- Renaissance fair
- Town privileges
