= Nottingham cheese riot =

1766 riot over food prices in England

- 1707 engraving of Nottingham. By 1766 it would have been much more developed.
- Date: 2 October 1766
- Location: Nottingham
- Caused by: Food shortages
- Result: Riot quashed by government troops several days after

Casualties
- Deaths: 1
- Injuries: Several

The Nottingham cheese riot, also known as the Great Cheese Riot, started on 2 October 1766 at the city's annual Goose Fair. Coming at a time of food shortages and rising foodstuff prices in England, violence broke out when city residents attempted to prevent Lincolnshire merchants from taking away Nottinghamshire cheeses they had bought at the fair. A warehouse, shops and a cargo boat were looted and hundreds of cheese wheels were rolled through the streets by angry rioters. Government troops were deployed when the mayor of Nottingham, Robie Swann, was unable to restore control. One man was killed and several wounded as the soldiers opened fire on the rioters. Order was eventually restored after several days of unrest.

== Background ==
The Nottingham Goose Fair traces its origins back to the feast of Matthew the Apostle, which was first celebrated in Nottingham during the 11th century. Eventually, the feast became a livestock market where geese were traded, and later became associated with horse trading, but by the 18th century it was most closely associated with foodstuffs including cheese, many tons of which were sold at the fair each year. The cheese manufactured in Nottingham at this time was sold in wheels and is believed to have been similar to Red Leicester.

A poor harvest across the country in 1766 led to fears of impending food shortages. In that year's fair, which began on 2 October, there was an abnormally large quantity of cheese for sale at inflated prices. There were recorded prices of 28 to 36 shillings (roughly £140–£180 in modern currency) per hundredweight (112 pounds or 51 kilograms) of cheese, around twice that recorded at Coventry just a week earlier. As a result of food shortages, the English public was anxious to keep foodstuffs in their local area; there were instances of merchants being overpowered and forced to sell their goods at pre-shortage rates.

== Riot ==
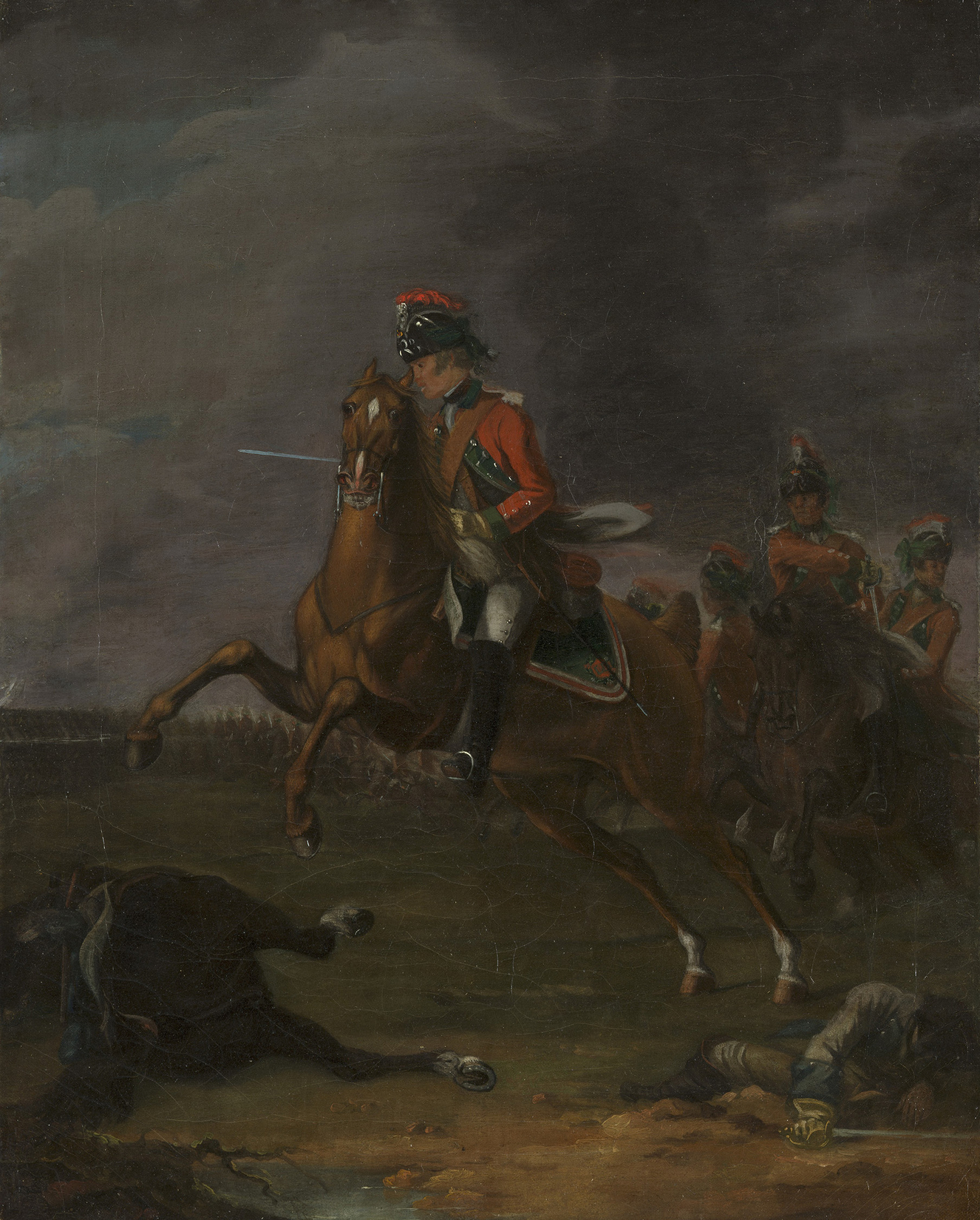
c. 1760 painting of the 1st Light Dragoons, which participated in the riot's suppression

A riot broke out on 2 October 1766 after several Lincolnshire merchants purchased a large quantity of cheese with the intention of selling it in their county. (Note: Turton (2009) gives 18 October as the start date but this appears to be an error. Potter (2015), McWilliams (2016) and the University of Nottingham give 2 October. There is an entry in the Records of the Borough of Nottingham: 1760–1800 for 2 October 1766 recording the payment of £1 5s by the mayor for a hearse to take Eggleston's body to Car Colston.) They were subsequently surrounded by a group of "rude lads" who demanded the merchants not take away the cheese and instead share it out in Nottingham. Violence eventually broke out over the dispute and rioters proceeded to loot a large quantity of cheese throughout Nottingham; shop windows were broken and hundreds of cheese wheels were thrown and rolled down the streets, including in Wheeler Gate and Peck Lane. The mayor of Nottingham, Robie Swann, attempted to disrupt the riot and restore order, but was knocked over by a rolling cheese wheel.

Some locals armed themselves and set up roadblocks on the city streets to prevent merchants from carrying away cheeses. A cargo boat near Trent Bridge was seized and all cheese held onboard was looted, despite its owner offering to pay the crowd or to sell his wares at a low cost. One warehouse was attacked and, although its defenders eventually drove the crowd off with firearms, some of the cheese stored within was looted as well. The warehouse's owner organised a mounted posse to track down the cheese, which had been taken to Castle Donington. The local magistrate refused to sign search warrants for houses in the village. In response, the posse detained several local residents on suspicion of rioting and beat them at the gates of the magistrates' house, demanding justice. The posse was eventually driven away by a mob of women and children throwing stones and withdrew, the cheese having been lost.

In Nottingham, the authorities requested military support to help restore order. The city was at the time a garrison town and the British Army's 1st Light Dragoons along with infantry and cavalry units of the Nottinghamshire Militia were deployed to suppress the riots. Troops fired into the rioting crowds, injuring several and killing one, William Eggleston of Car Colston, who was standing near a pile of cheese. Eggleston was a farmer and it appears he was killed while protecting his own wares, having been mistaken for a looter. Several people were detained and brought before magistrates in a private residence but were freed after the house was attacked by rioters, who gained access to the building by smashing its windows. The unrest continued overnight.

== Aftermath and legacy ==
Violence continued in Nottingham for several days until the army restored order. For a while, wagons carrying cheese were formed into convoys and provided with an armed escort. A local newspaper, the Leicester and Nottingham Journal, accused the rioters of having caused a cheese shortage in the city. There were other riots in England in late 1766 caused by foodstuff shortages and increasing food prices. The disorder was particularly severe in Devon and Cornwall but there were also serious outbreaks in Gloucester, Bristol, Derby, Birmingham and Norwich; South East England, however, was largely quiet. The 250th anniversary of the riot was marked in 2016 by the Lord Mayor of Nottingham, Mohammed Saghir, in conjunction with a local cheese shop.
