= Forest Recreation Ground =

Park in Nottingham, United Kingdom

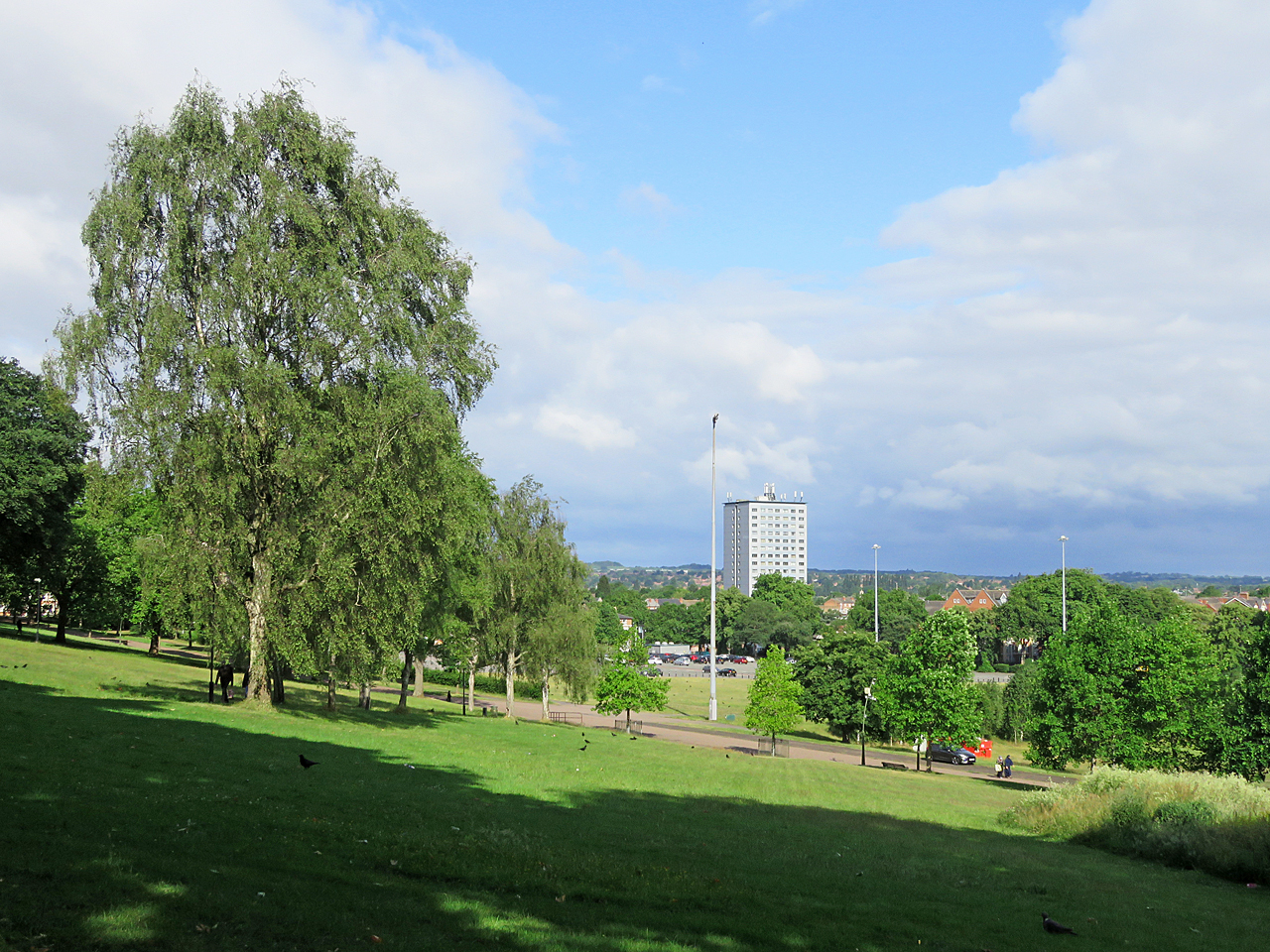
- A view across the recreation ground

- Location within Nottingham
- Location: Nottingham, England
- Coordinates: 52°57′54″N 1°09′36″W
- Area: 80 acres (32 ha)
- Created: 1845; 181 years ago
- Operator: Nottingham City Council
- Status: Open year round
- Website: www.nottinghamcity.gov.uk/ForestRec

The Forest Recreation Ground is an open space and recreation ground in Nottingham, England, approximately one mile north of the city centre. This urban space is bounded by the neighbourhoods of Forest Fields to the north, Mapperley Park to the east, Arboretum to the south and Hyson Green to the west. It is best known as the site of the city's famous annual Goose Fair.

== History ==
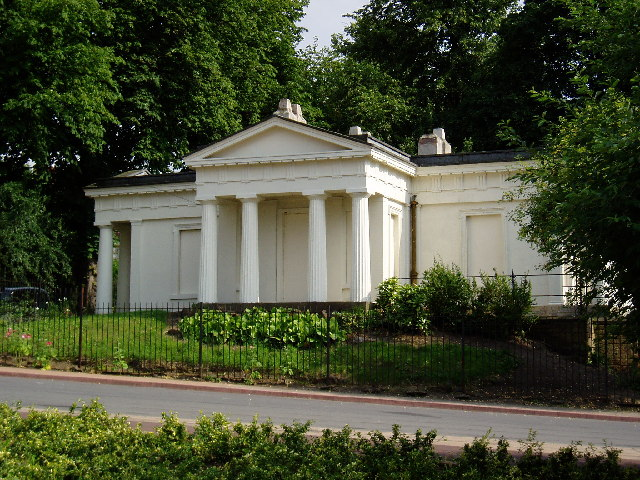
The Lodge, by Mansfield Road. Built in 1857 by Henry Moses Wood as the Lodge to the racecourse

The name "Forest" derives comes from the Middle Ages when the land that is now a recreation ground was part of the Sherwood Forest that once extended from the city of Nottingham to the north of Nottinghamshire. The site was the southernmost part of Sherwood Forest and was part of the open area known formerly as "The Lings" which, largely covered by gorse and scrub, extended into the parishes of Lenton, Radford and Basford.

The site of the Forest was one of the original areas to be protected in perpetuity by the St. Mary's Nottingham Inclosure Act 1845 (8 & 9 Vict. c. 7 Pr.), which set aside some 80 acres (32 ha) of Sherwood Forest for public recreational use. In commemoration, the Mayor of Nottingham planted the "Inclosure Oak" which can still be seen at the Mansfield Road entrance to the Forest. Joseph Paxton, a leading gardener and architect of the nineteenth century, was responsible for the criss-cross formation of walkways.

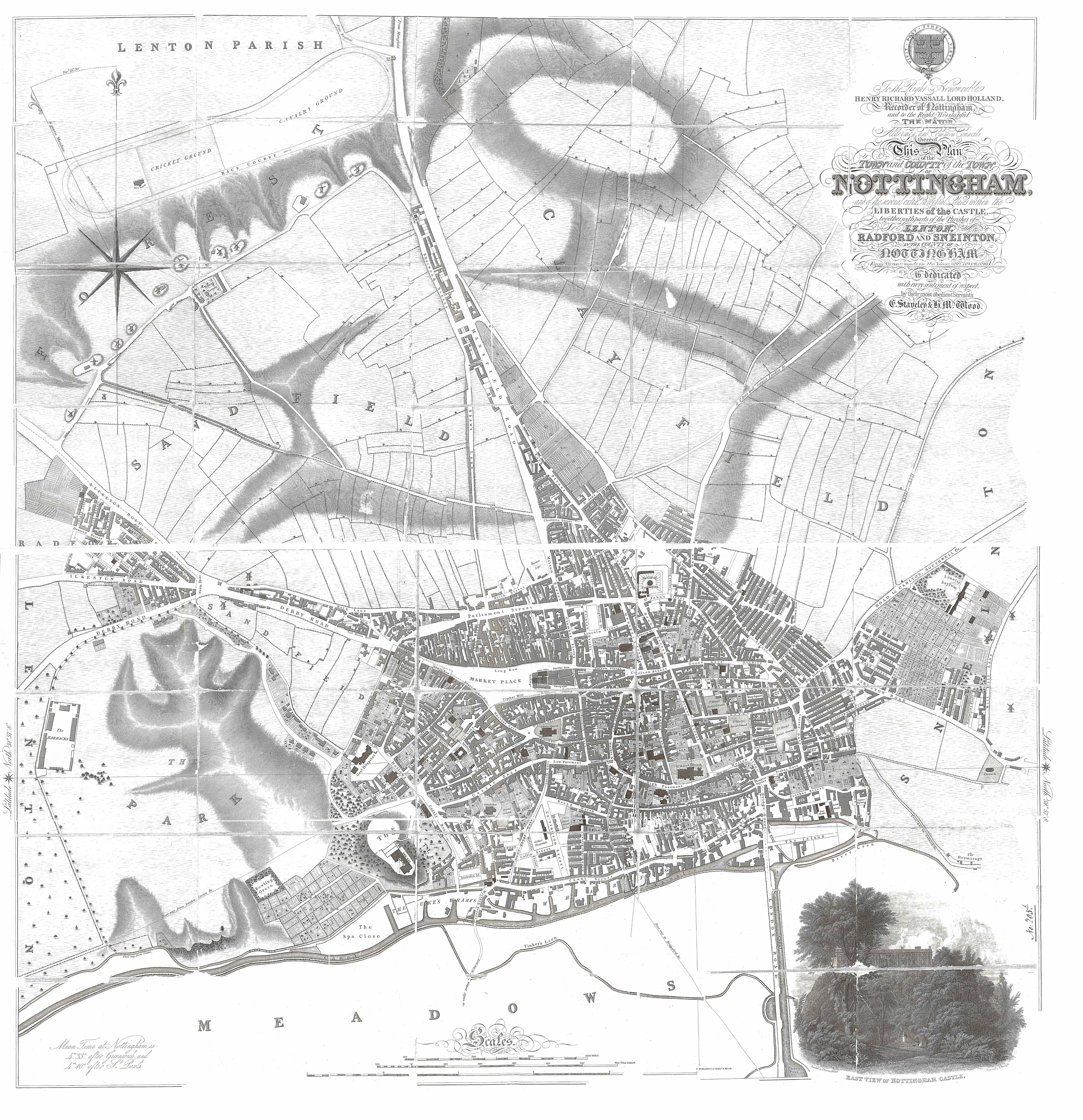
The Forest, with race course, cricket ground and windmills can be seen in the top left of Staveley and Wood's 1831 map of Nottingham

For over 300 years the Forest has been home to sport, including horse racing, cricket and football. It was home to Nottingham Racecourse by 1773, and it remained there until it moved to its current location at Colwick, south east of Nottingham, at the end of the 19th century. Nottingham Forest Football Club first played their games on the Forest after their formation in 1865, hence the club's name.

Standing at the Mansfield Road entrance is Forest Lodge, built in 1857. This Grade II listed building was originally used as a Police or Keeper's Lodge and a police cell can still be seen at basement level. A red granite monument stands at the Monument Gate on Forest Road East, commemorating the fallen of the Boer War.

By comparison with its sporting heritage, the use of the Forest for the city's traditional Goose Fair is relatively recent. The fair has existed since at least 1541, but it only moved to the Forest in 1928, from its previous long term home in the city's Old Market Square.

== Cultural events ==
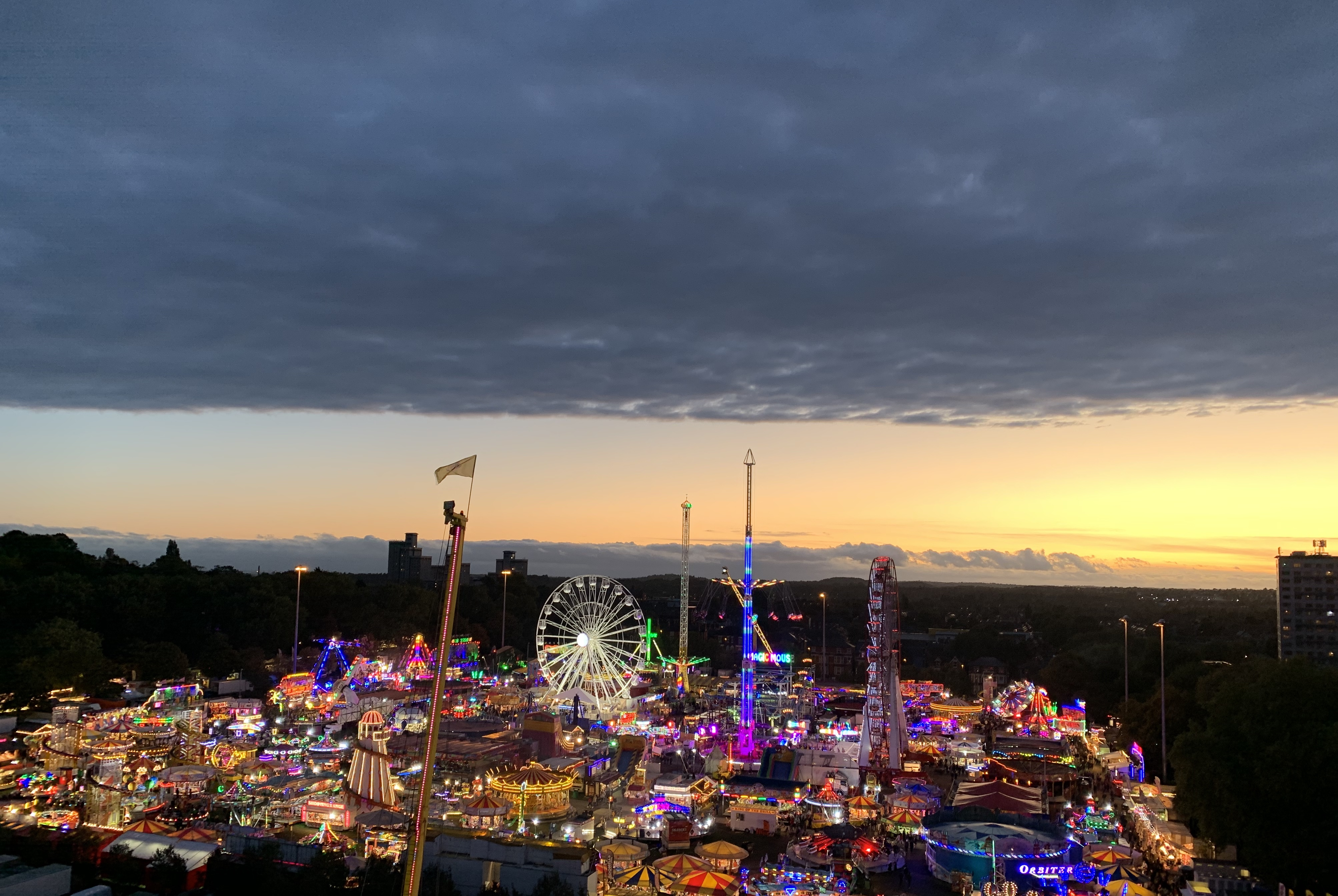
Nottingham Goose Fair

The city's Goose Fair is held on the Forest in October of every year. Other smaller travelling fairs and circuses take place on the recreation ground throughout the year, usually coinciding with local school holidays.

== Sports and recreation ==
The Forest Recreation Ground boasts floodlit hard surface courts and grass pitches for ball games, and a traditional bowling lawn. There is also an enclosed children's playground. These facilities are maintained by Nottingham City Council.

=== Parkrun ===
A parkrun is run at the grounds each week.

== Flora and fauna ==
The Forest Recreation Ground supports many important habitats and species. Mature trees include turkey oak, English elm, pedunculate oak, sessile oak, rowan, silver birch, common lime and horse-chestnut. Additionally, there have been more recent plantings of London plane, beech, various maples and silver lime. Perennials include autumn crocus, spring crocus, bluebell, ramsons, primrose, wild privet, hazel and guelder rose.

Certain parts of the Forest play host to relic meadow flora such as meadow foxtail, short-stemmed meadow-grass, Yorkshire fog, red clover, white clover, oxeye daisy, germander speedwell and meadow saxifrage.

With such an abundance of habitat, the Forest attracts many birds such as nuthatches, treecreepers, mistle thrushes, tawny owls, song thrushes, great spotted woodpeckers and chaffinches.

The caves of the Rock Cemetery are a Geological County Wildlife Site. The thin turf here supports early and silver hairgrass, harebells, bird's-foot trefoil and spiked sedge. Conspicuous insects include the holly blue, hornets and cockchafer beetles.

== Public transport ==
The Forest is home to a park-and-ride site, with spaces for more than 950 cars. Nottingham Express Transit's Forest tram stop is adjacent to the car park, and provides frequent services to and from the city centre and other city locations.

== Restoration of the Forest ==
As with much urban parkland, the Forest has been threatened by development. Proposals for a recreation centre, to be built on the eastern fringes of the Forest, were rejected following public opposition to loss of green space. However, mature trees and greenery at the northwest corner of the ground have been cut down to provide 989 parking spaces for the Park & Ride that serves the "Forest" stop for Nottingham Express Transit.

As at summer 2008, the Forest was the subject of a public consultation to decide on regeneration priorities, to be funded by an expected Heritage Lottery Fund award. For the last four years, Nottingham City Council and Nottingham's Partnership Council have worked on plans to restore the parkland to its former glory and to better serve the needs of today's park users. The project is also backed by the Commission for Architecture and the Built Environment (CABE) and by local organisations such as Friends of the Forest.

The Forest's £5.2 million restoration project was completed during September 2013. The project encompassed: the restoration and refurbishment of the lodge (now office space) and the pavilion (which now houses a new café, public toilets and office space); the reparation and improvement of footpaths; replacement of park benches, improvements to access to sporting facilities; the amelioration of lighting and security; the expansion of planting areas; and the creation of higher-quality activity areas for young people. Additionally, railings were erected, for example the new green-coloured metal fences next to the bus stop near the Forest's Mansfield Road entrance, as well as the custom panelled columns. In design, these railings are very similar to the historic ones nearby.

The final phase of the Forest project created a sports zone with new sports pitches and changing rooms, paid for by the Premier League, the Football Association and Sport England. Work started on the sports zone in November 2014 and completed on 28 October 2015 with an opening event and the unveiling of a plaque in memory of local community activist Jim Taylor who was a driving force behind the project.

== Friends of the Forest ==
‘Friends of the Forest’ is a not-for-profit organisation, funded by donations and public subscription. It supports efforts to maintain the Forest as an accessible, open, green space which has historic importance for the City of Nottingham. Friends of the Forest has worked with Nottingham City Council to prioritise refurbishment and replanting, and to organise voluntary activities that benefit the Forest and increase local awareness of green issues.

== See also ==
- Listed buildings in Nottingham (Hyson Green and Arboretum ward)
