= Mansfield railway station (Nottinghamshire) =

Railway station in Nottinghamshire, England

Coordinates: 53°08′32″N 01°11′55″W

Mansfield
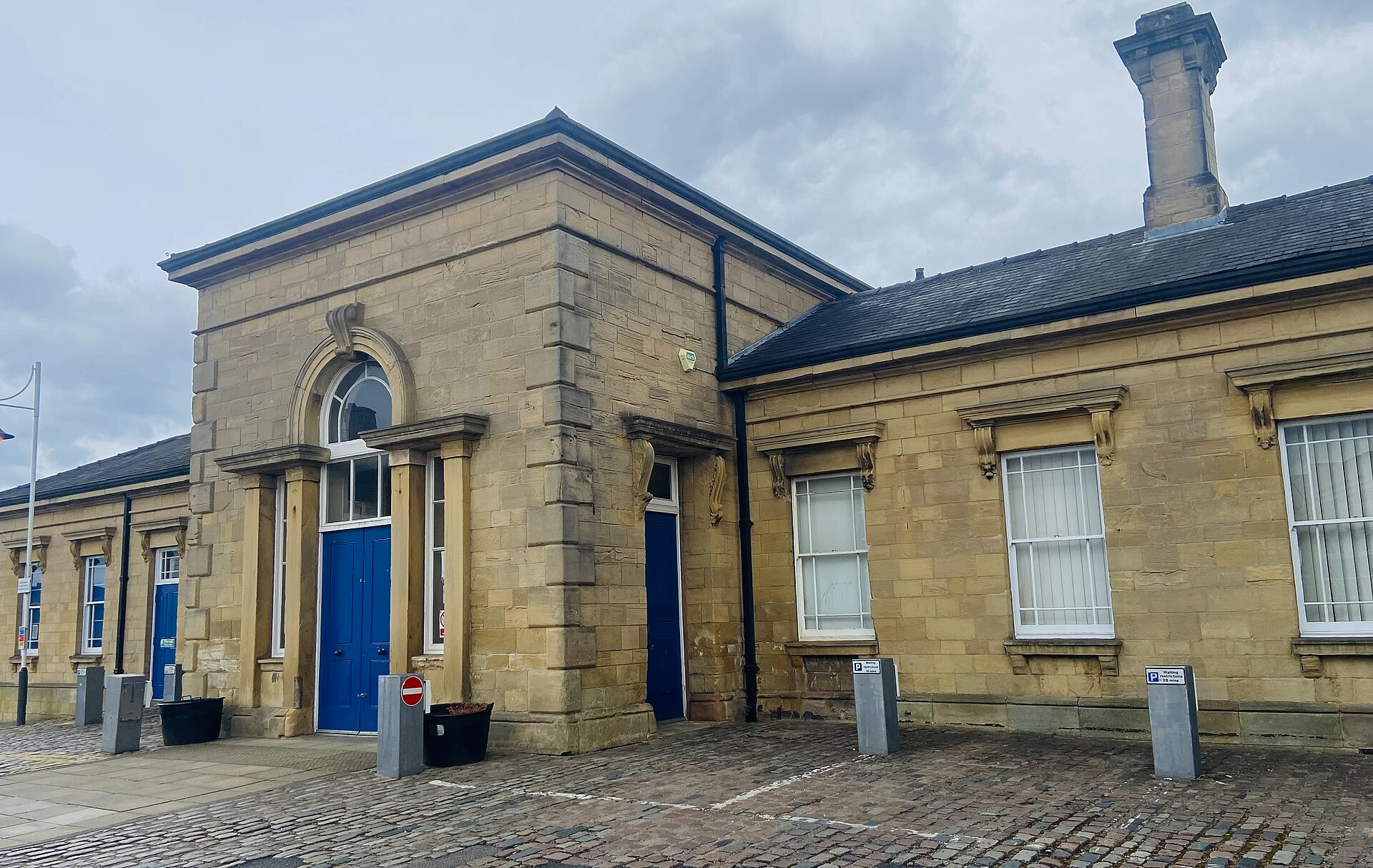

General information
- Location: Mansfield; England
- Grid reference: SK536608
- Manager: East Midlands Railway
- Platforms: 2

Other information
- Station code: MFT
- Classification: DfT category F1

History
- Original company: Midland Railway
- Pre-grouping: Midland Railway
- Post-grouping: London, Midland and Scottish Railway

Key dates
- 9 October 1849: Opened as Mansfield
- 1872-75: Station buildings rebuilt
- 11 August 1952: Renamed Mansfield Town
- 12 October 1964: Closed
- 10 November 1995: Reopened as Mansfield

Passengers
- 2021/22: ▲0.259 million
- 2022/23: ▲0.303 million
- 2023/24: ▲0.314 million
- 2024/25: ▲0.323 million
- 2025/26: ▲0.336 million

Listed Building – Grade II
- Feature: Mansfield railway station
- Designated: 17 Mar 1978
- Reference no.: 1288236
Location
Notes
- Passenger statistics from the Office of Rail and Road

Mansfield railway station serves the town of Mansfield in Nottinghamshire, England. It was also known as Mansfield Town, to distinguish itself from the GCR's former Mansfield Central and Mansfield Woodhouse stations. It is a stop on the Robin Hood Line, located 17 miles (27 km) north of Nottingham; it is managed by East Midlands Railway. The station building is Grade II listed.

== History ==
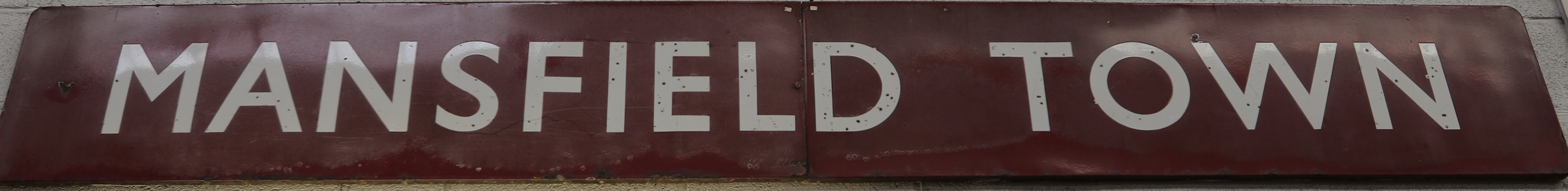
Sign for Mansfield Town station at the Midland Railway Centre, Swanwick

The town was originally the terminus of the Mansfield and Pinxton Railway, built in 1819. It was bought by the Midland Railway, which used the final section to extend its new Leen Valley line to the present station in 1849. The station opened for passenger traffic without ceremony on Tuesday 9 October 1849. The line suffered from some teething problems in its early days. The Derby Mercury of 24 October 1849 criticised the quality of construction noting that:

engines have been off the line in the station yard at Mansfield several times since the opening on Tuesday week. The curves here are so sharp that a small engine can scarcely pull a train of four or five carriages out of the year. On Sunday [21 October 1849] morning last as the train due in at nine a.m. was coming in, the engine went off the rails, and it took upwards of half an hour to get it on again; so that the train, which ought to have quitted Mansfield at 9.15 a.m. did not leave until 10 min. to 10 a.m. Surely some alterations will be made to prevent future accidents of this description.

In September 1850 the fares on the line to Nottingham were halved, and the number of passenger doubled.

The present station building was constructed by the Midland Railway in 1872; to the designs of the architect John Holloway Sanders. The contractor was C. Humphreys. The new station was opened on Friday 1 March 1872. The principal entrance was from Queen Street, by a path parallel with the viaduct. The station now comprised two platforms. The down platform had the main station building with a booking hall with oak floors, Ladies’ first class waiting room, Gentlemen's first class waiting room, Ladies’ second class waiting room, and booking and parcel offices. On one side of the building was the porters’ room and the lamp room, and at the other end there was a fish house, and carriage and horse dock. On the up platform there was a boiler room to provide hot water for foot warmers, a Ladies’ waiting room, and the office of the stationmaster. The down line platform was 105 yards (96 m) and the up line platform was 67 yards (61 m) longer to accommodate Southwell trains. The platforms were equipped with pedants and pedestals for illumination at night.

This improvement to the station took place at the same time as the engineer to the Midland Railway company, John Crossley, implemented a deviation of the railway between Sutton and Mansfield of around 1.25 miles (2.01 km) avoiding three sharp curves, the worst at King's mill. The new line included four bridges and a viaduct over the Hermitage reservoir.

The station building acquired listed status in 1978, and was renovated and opened as a cafe-bar in 1986. The site of the old goods yard at Station Street, known as Portland Wharf, was converted into a large Co-Op foodstore in 1984. The former Portland Sidings site at Wharf Road was converted into a bulky goods retail Park from 2000.

When planning to re-establish a passenger rail service to the area, consideration was given to creating a new station at Toothill Lane in the town centre. Mansfield District Council started refurbishment work on the old station buildings and site in February 1994. Mansfield pioneered railway in the East Midlands. Following passenger service closure in 1964, Mansfield remained isolated from the rail system until 1995, when the Robin Hood Line was reopened connecting to Nottingham. Before 1995, the town was the largest in the United Kingdom without a passenger service. The nearest railway service was at Alfreton station, Derbyshire, then-known as Alfreton and Mansfield Parkway.

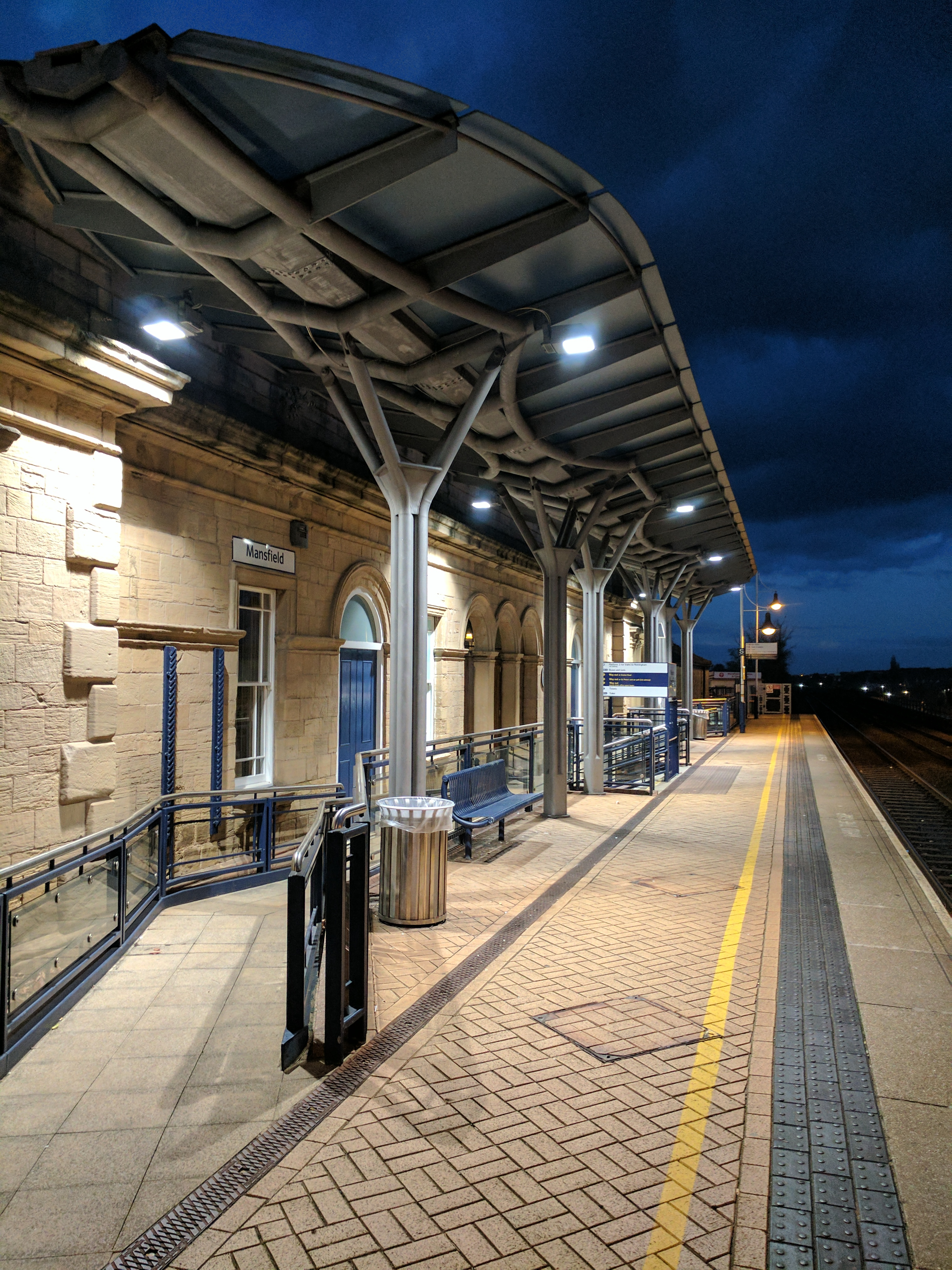
The platform at the station

In 2011, Nottinghamshire County Council developed a new bus station close to the rail station as a transport interchange.

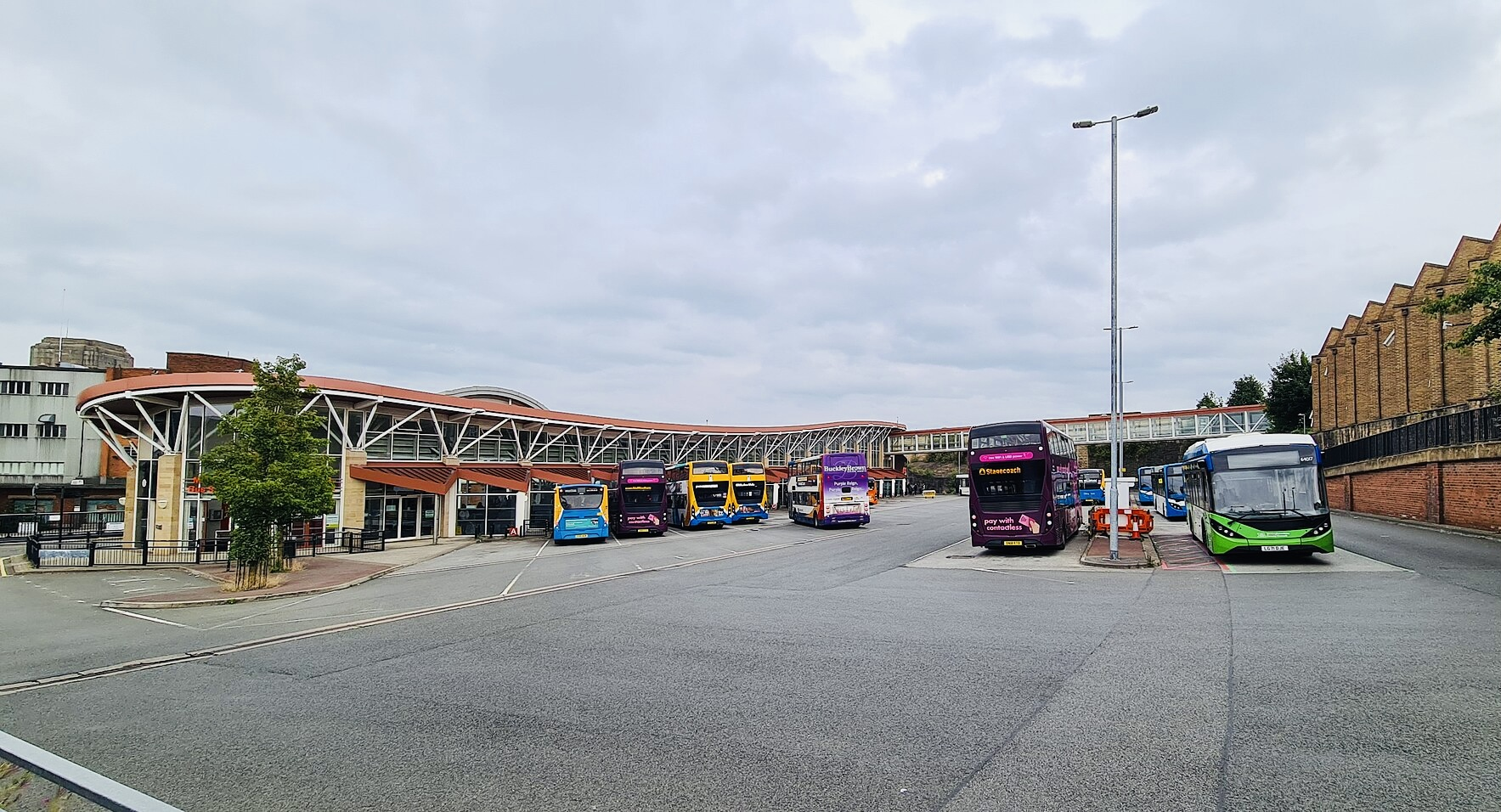
Mansfield Bus Station

== Services ==
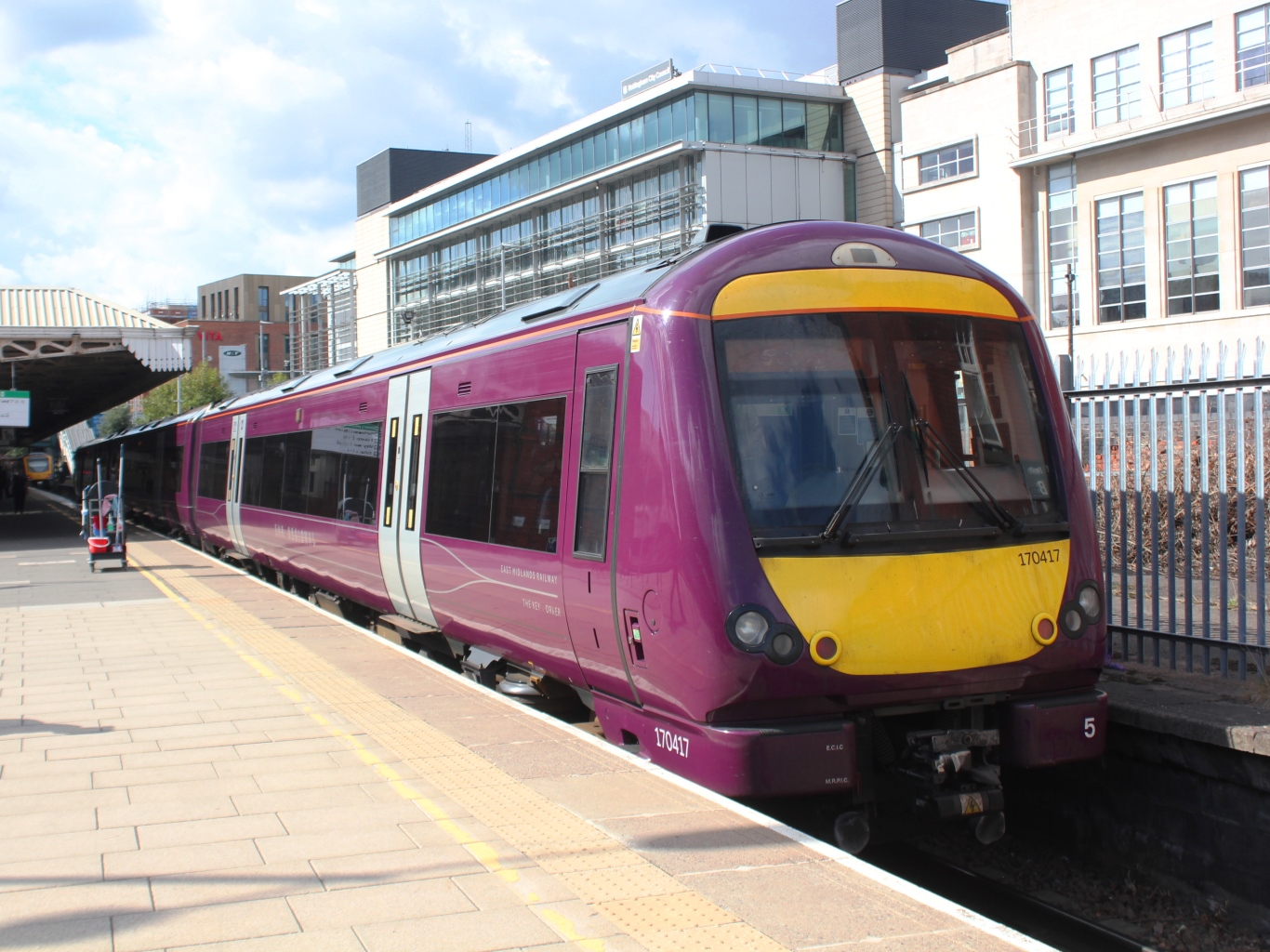
East Midlands Railway train on the Robin Hood Line

All services at Mansfield are operated by East Midlands Railway.

During the weekday off-peak and on Saturdays, the station is generally served by an hourly service northbound to Worksop and southbound to Nottingham. During the peak hours, the station is also served by an additional two trains per day between Nottingham and Mansfield Woodhouse.

On Sundays, the station is served by a two-hourly service between Nottingham and Mansfield Woodhouse, with no service to Worksop. Sunday services to Worksop are due to recommence at the station during the life of the East Midlands franchise.

The station has the PlusBus scheme, where train and bus tickets can be bought together at a saving. It is connected via skybridge to Mansfield bus station.

Mansfield was also once served by services to Rolleston via stations at Blidworth and Rainworth, Farnsfield, Kirklington and Edingley and Southwell. There was also services to Chesterfield over the Doe Lea Branch and Clowne Branch lines via the towns of Clowne, Bolsover and Staveley. These lines were closed in the 1930s and 1950s to passengers. Mansfield also had services along the original Robin Hood alignment to stations at Kirkby East and Sutton Junction which also closed when Mansfield did. These were replaced by the modern day Kirkby station and Sutton station, although opened a distance from their original sites.

Preceding station	National Rail	Following station
Sutton Parkway	East Midlands Railway Robin Hood Line	Mansfield Woodhouse

== Facilities close by ==
=== Nottinghamshire Mining Museum ===
A small museum dedicated to local coal mining history is situated at East Unit, within the station building.

=== Midland Hotel ===
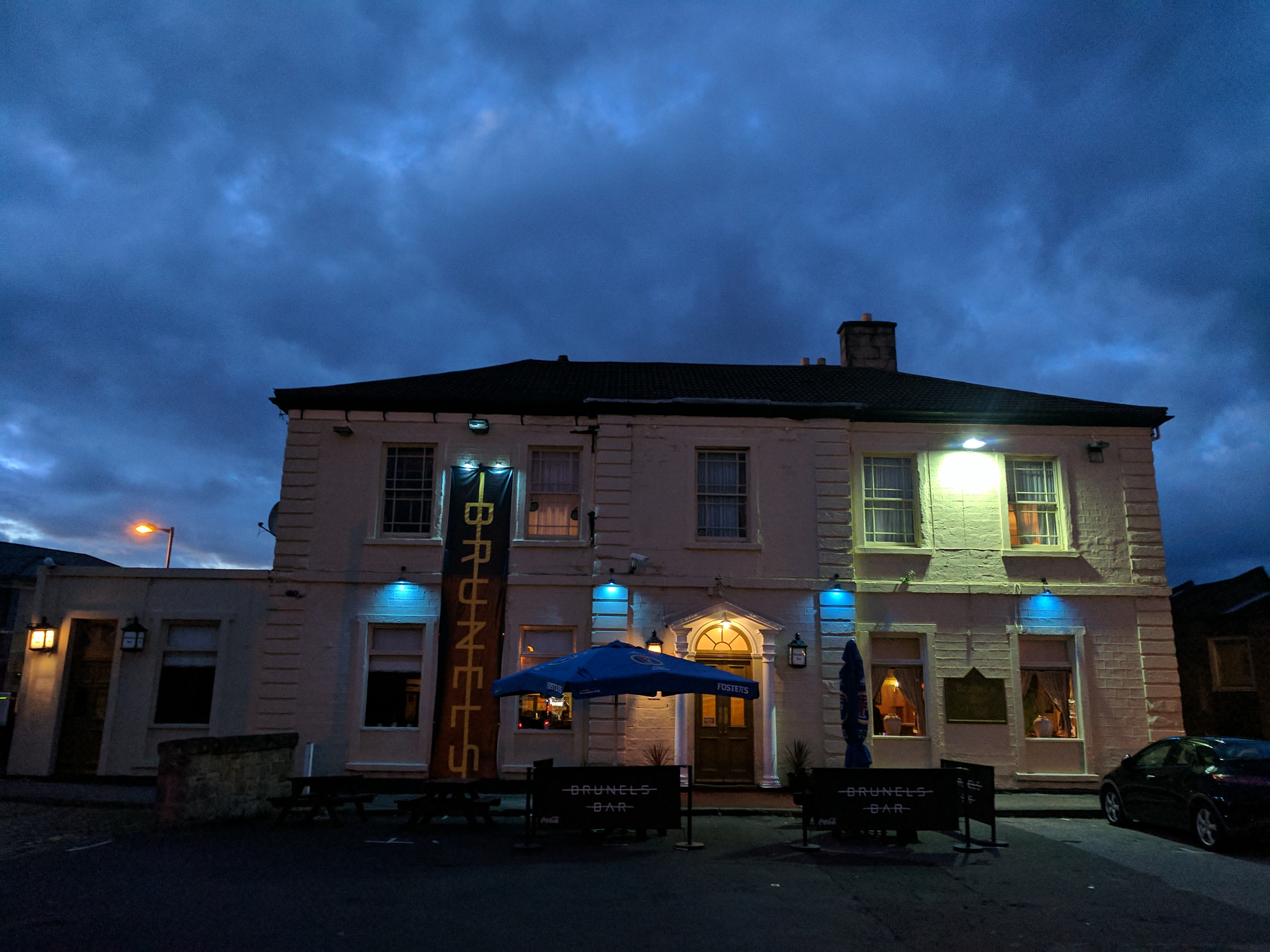
Midland Hotel with rail station behind camera position

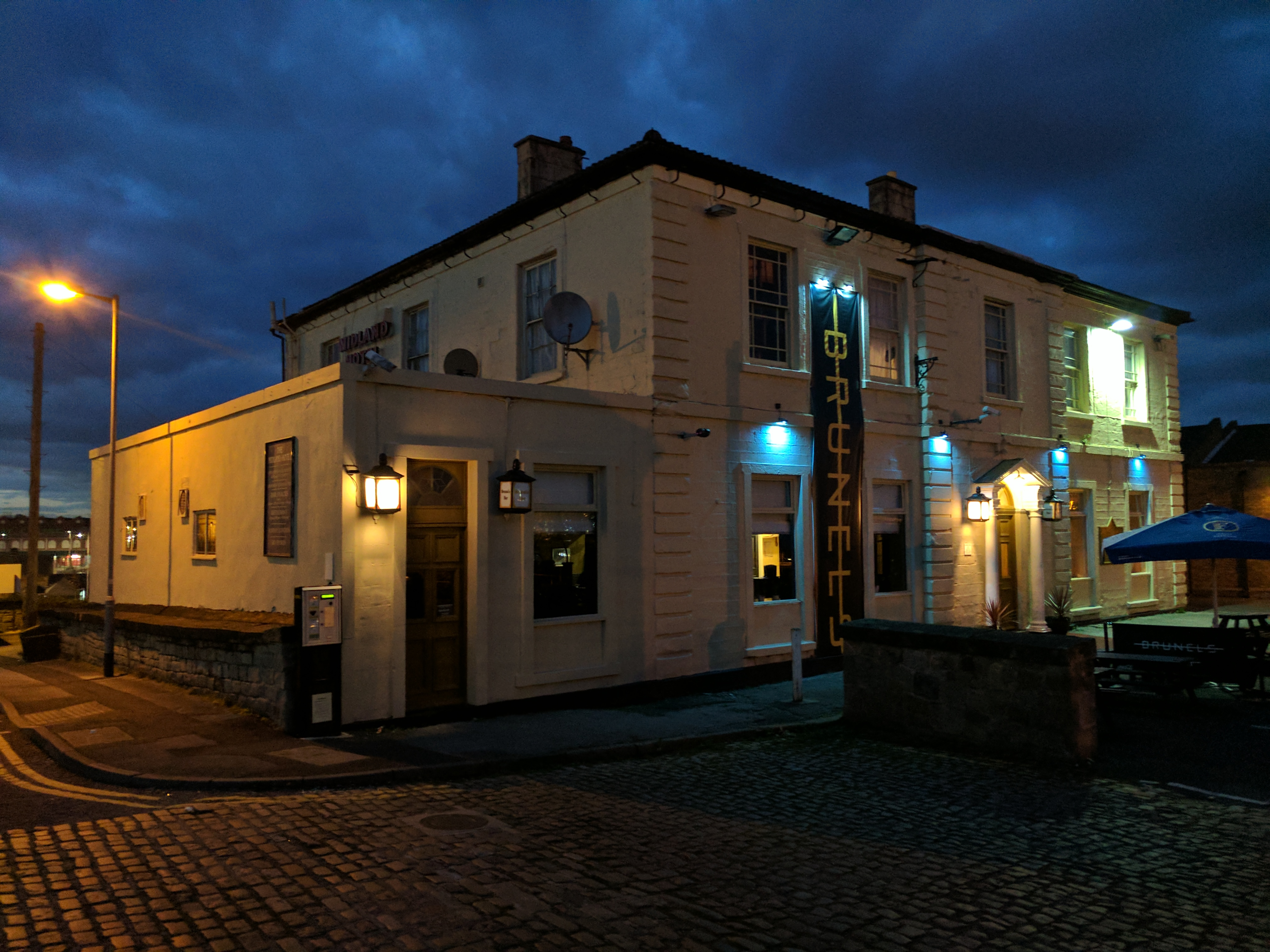
The hotel from the side. The back of the hotel looks over Mansfield Bus Station

The hotel is adjacent to the station building. Registered as a grade II listed building from 1978, it was originally a mental asylum named Broom House, built in the early 1800s, then purchased by the Midland Railway Company and converted into a hotel in 1862.

In 2023 the hotel was reported as being used to house asylum seekers.

== See also ==
- Listed buildings in Mansfield (inner area)
