= Blidworth and Rainworth railway station =

Former railway station in Nottinghamshire, England

Coordinates: 53.115508°N 1.112048°W

Blidworth and Rainworth
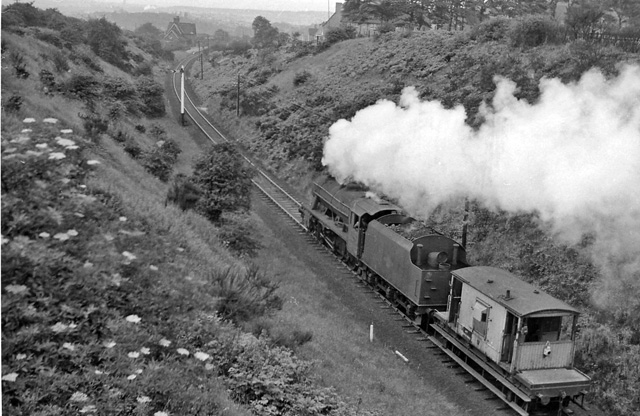
- Blidworth and Rainworth railway station in the distance in 1963

General information
- Location: England
- Grid reference: SK594579

Other information
- Status: Disused

History
- Pre-grouping: Midland Railway
- Post-grouping: London, Midland and Scottish Railway

Key dates
- 1871: Opened as Rainworth
- 24 March 1877: Renamed Blidworth
- 12 August 1929: Closed to passengers
- 25 June 1964: Closed to freight
Location

Blidworth and Rainworth railway station served the villages of Blidworth and Rainworth in Nottinghamshire, England; it was a stop on the Midland Railway's Rolleston Junction to Mansfield line.

== History ==
The station opened in 1871 as Rainworth when the Midland Railway extended the existing Rollesdon Junction to Southwell line from Southwell to Mansfield.

It was renamed Blidworth on 24 March 1877.

The station closed to passengers on 12 August 1929 when the Mansfield to Southwell section, which passed through a mining area, closed to passengers. The railway replaced it with a road motor omnibus service provided in conjunction with Mansfield and District Tramways Limited connecting with the railway stations between Mansfield and Newark. Freight services continued until 25 June 1964.

Nothing remains of the station or trackbed and it has been lost to a housing development called Curzon Close.

== Services ==
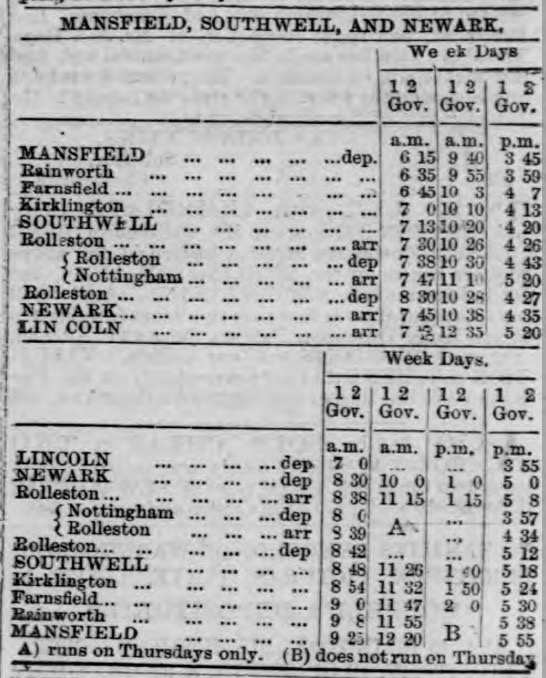
Timetable from the Derbyshire Times and Chesterfield Herald, on Saturday 12 August 1871, showing the station named as Rainworth

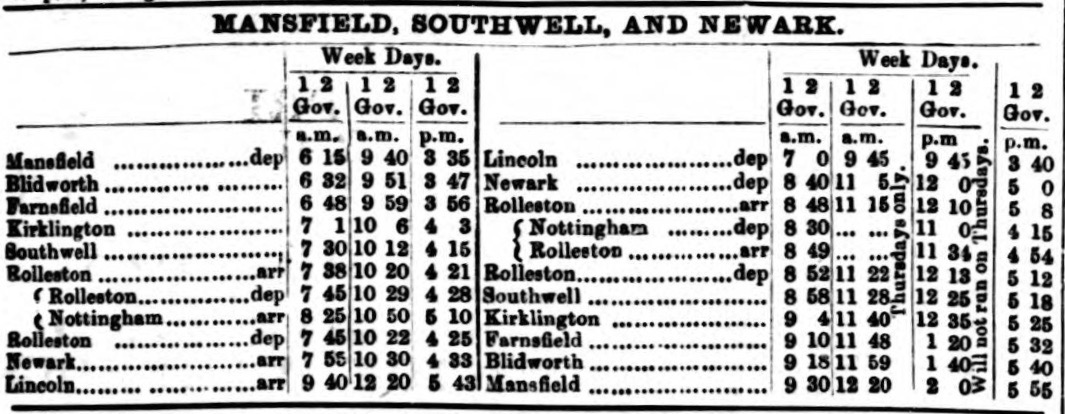
Timetable from Mansfield Reporter, on 29 November 1878, showing the station named as Blidworth

Preceding station	Disused railways	Following station
Farnsfield; Line and station closed	Midland Railway; Rolleston Junction to Mansfield	Sutton Junction; Line and station closed

== Stationmasters ==
- A. Nowell 1872–1875 (formerly station master at Worthington)
- E. Prisgrane 1875–1879
- G. Lambert 1879–1884
- W. Doughty 1884–1908
- Charles Walter Chapple 1908–1929
