= Fiskerton railway station =

Railway station in Nottinghamshire, England

Coordinates: 53°03′38″N 0°54′43″W

Fiskerton
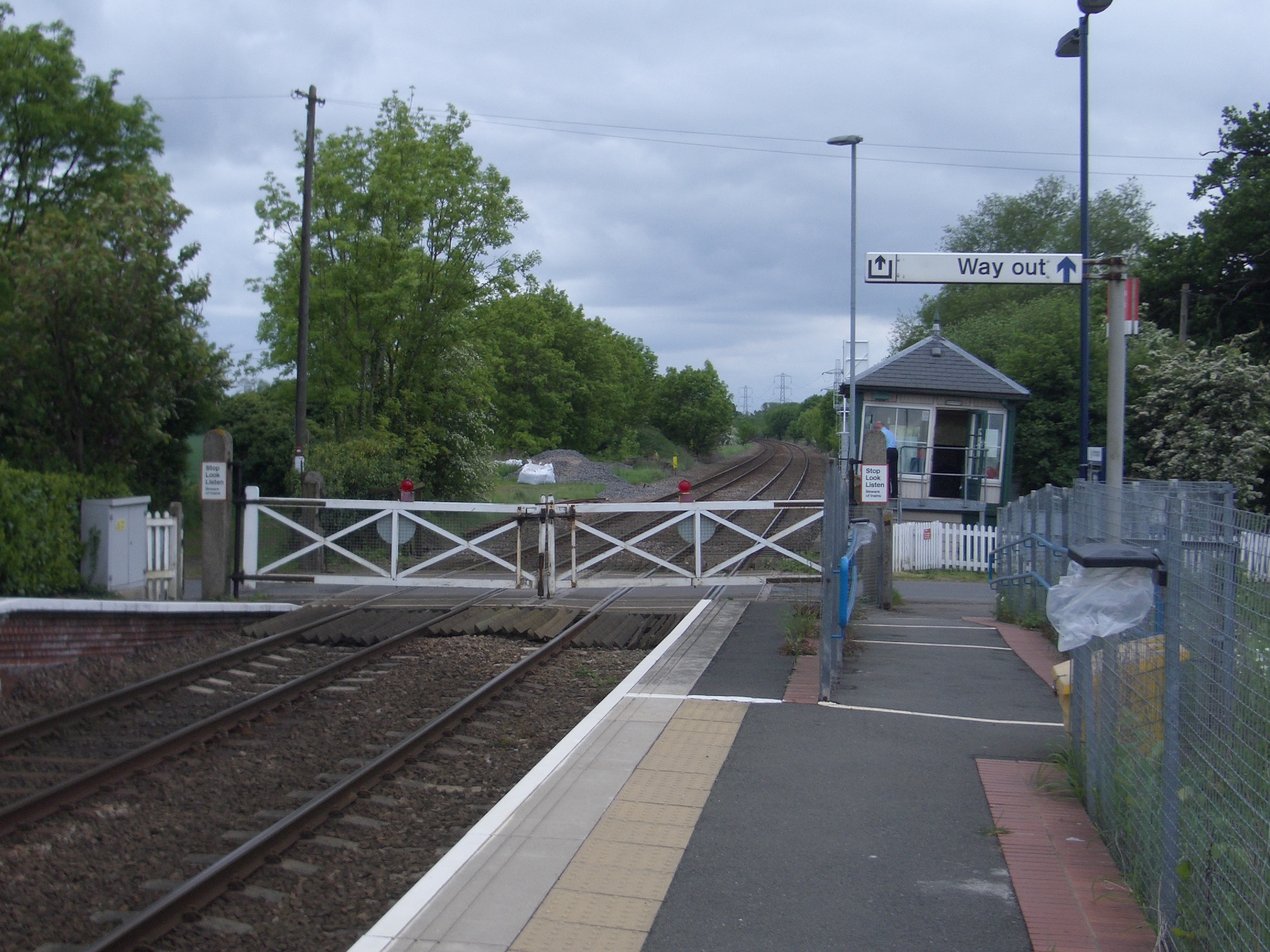

General information
- Location: Fiskerton, Newark and Sherwood, Nottinghamshire; England
- Grid reference: SK729520
- Manager: East Midlands Railway
- Platforms: 2

Other information
- Station code: FSK
- Classification: DfT category F2

Passengers
- 2021/22: ▲16,198
- 2022/23: ▲21,274
- 2023/24: ▲22,642
- 2024/25: ▲27,828
- 2025/26: ▲36,902
Location
Notes
- Passenger statistics from the Office of Rail and Road

Fiskerton railway station is a stop on the Nottingham to Lincoln Line and serves the village of Fiskerton in Nottinghamshire, England; it is located 3 mi (4.8 km) south-east of the minster town of Southwell.

== History ==
The station opened on 4 August 1846 by the Midland Railway. It was taken over by the London, Midland and Scottish Railway in 1923 and subsequently by British Rail in 1948.

A signal box was installed at the station in 1902; this Midland Railway Type 3a box was downgraded to a gate box from 2 December 1934.

A new junction was laid between Fiskerton and the Rolleston Junction to Southwell line in 1929, to allow mineral trains from Mansfield and district to access Nottingham without reversing at Rolleston Junction. At the same time, a new signal box was built to a Midland Railway Type 3c design with a 30 lever frame and gate wheel to operate the level crossing barriers. The curve closed on 1 March 1965 and the railway junction was abolished.

Signalling on the line was upgraded in 2016, when the manual signal boxes were decommissioned and control transferred to the East Midlands Integrated Electronic Control Centre at Derby.

In 2017, Network Rail announced that the platforms would be extended to cater for longer trains; it announced a plan in 2020 to relocate the signal box to the Vale of Berkeley Railway in Gloucestershire.

=== Stationmasters ===
- Thomas Marston 1851
- H. Briggs until 1860
- John Pick 1861 - 1864 (afterwards station master at Beeston)
- S Cobb from 1864
- Joseph Monney (or Minney) ca. 1870 until 1873
- Henry Hawkins 1873
- J. Blackwell 1873 - 1877 (formerly station master at Tonge and Breedon)
- W. Booth 1875 - 1877 (called upon to resign)
- Thomas Braddock 1877 - 1879
- Edward Presgrave 1879 – 1883 (afterwards station master at Barrow upon Soar)
- G. Butler 1883 - 1888
- William Tunn 1888 - 1890 (formerly station master at Kirkby Stephen, afterwards station master at Kirkby in Ashfield)
- William Henry Higginson 1890 – ca. 1914
- G. Jay 1915 – 1925 (afterwards station master at Desford)
- William George Dudderidge from 1925 (also station master at Rolleston Junction)
- Arnold Foster 1936 – 1942
- H.J. Lane until 1947
- F.W.E. Clarke from 1947 (formerly stationmaster at Widmerpool)
- A. Newcombe ca. 1951 ca. 1955

== Facilities ==
The station is unstaffed and offers limited facilities other than two shelters, bicycle storage, timetables and modern help points. The full range of tickets can be purchased from the guard on the train at no extra cost as there are no retail facilities at this station.

== Services ==
East Midlands Railway operate all services at Fiskerton using Class 158 and 170 DMUs.

The typical off-peak service in trains per hour is:

- 1 tph to Crewe via Nottingham
- 1 tph to Lincoln

The station is also served by one train per day to and from London St Pancras International, which is operated using a Class 222 Meridian.

On Sundays, there is roughly an hourly service between Matlock and Lincoln from mid-morning onwards, with no service to and from London.

Preceding station	National Rail	Following station
Bleasby	East Midlands Railway Nottingham to Lincoln Line	Rolleston
	Disused railways	
Terminus	Midland Railway Fiskerton to Mansfield	Southwell Line and station closed

== Gallery ==
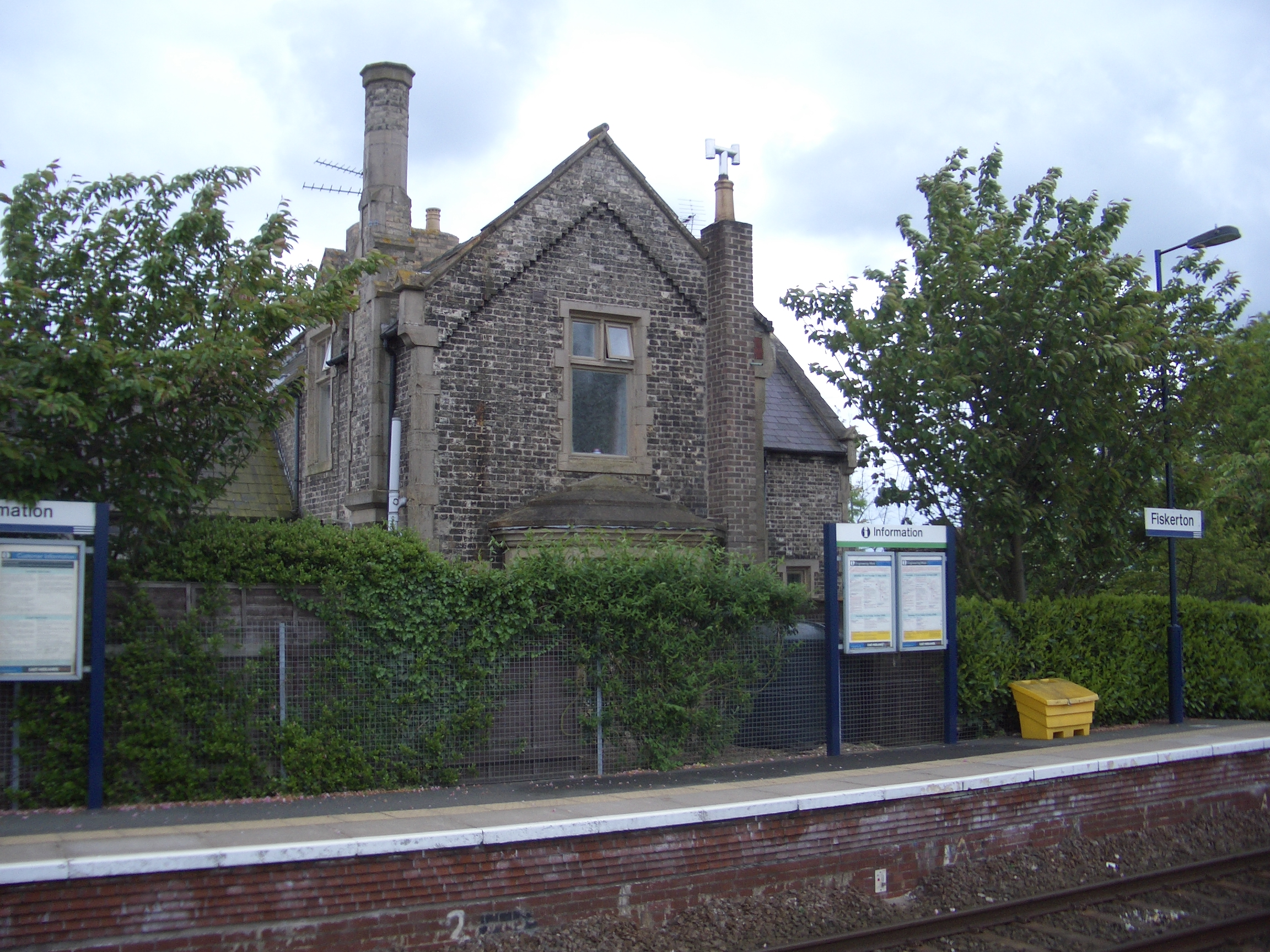
17 May 2008

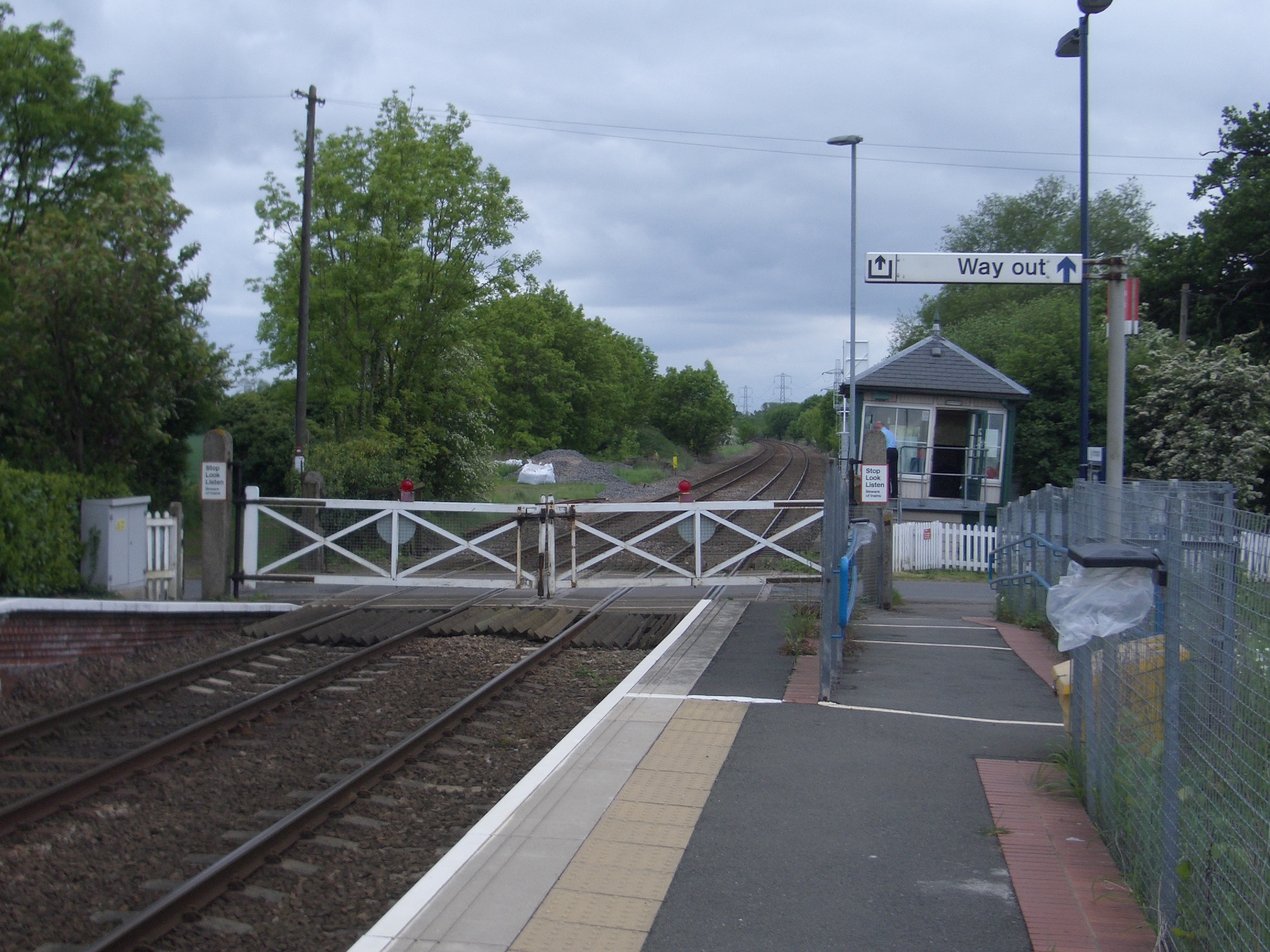
17 May 2008

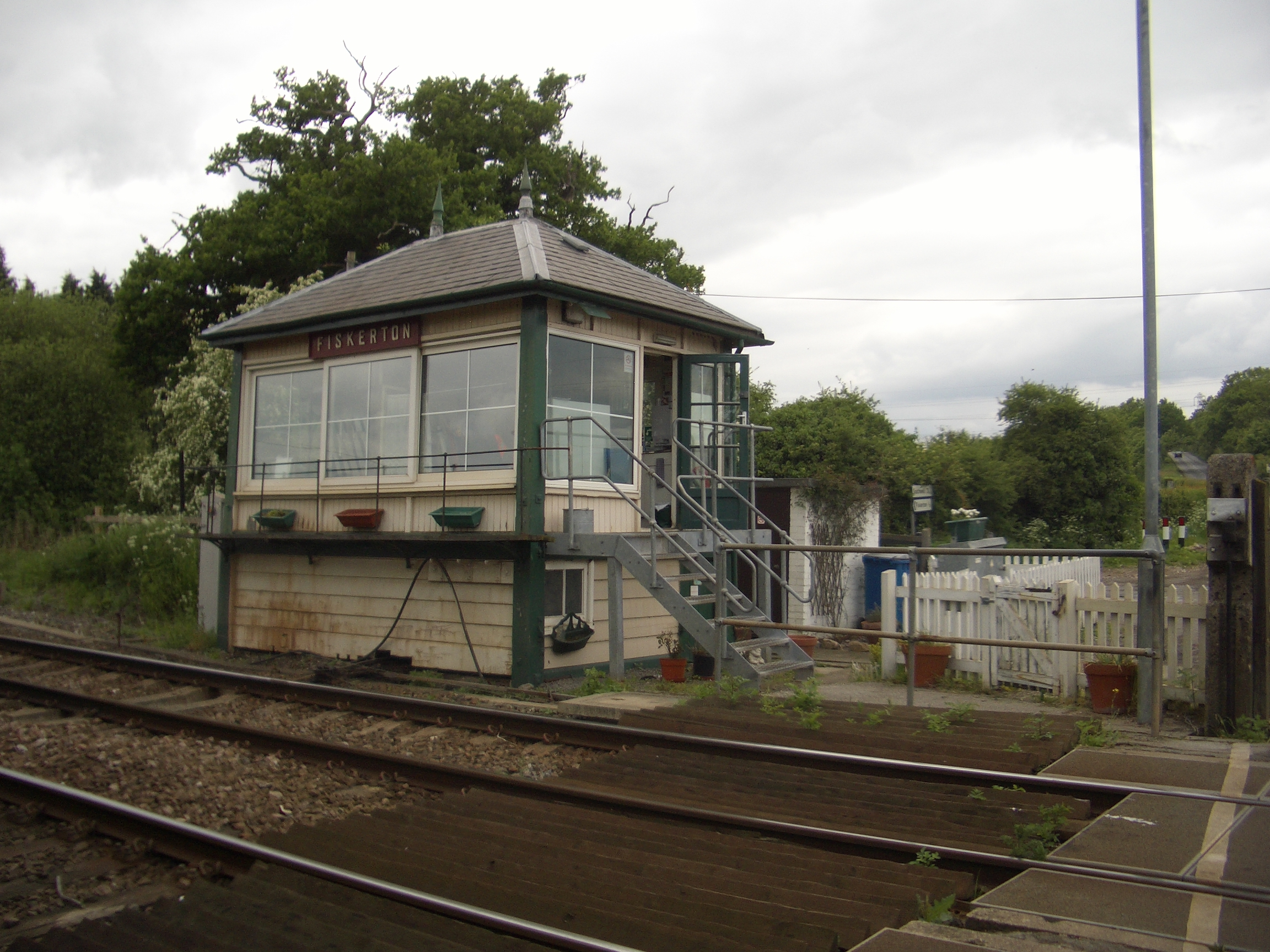
17 May 2008

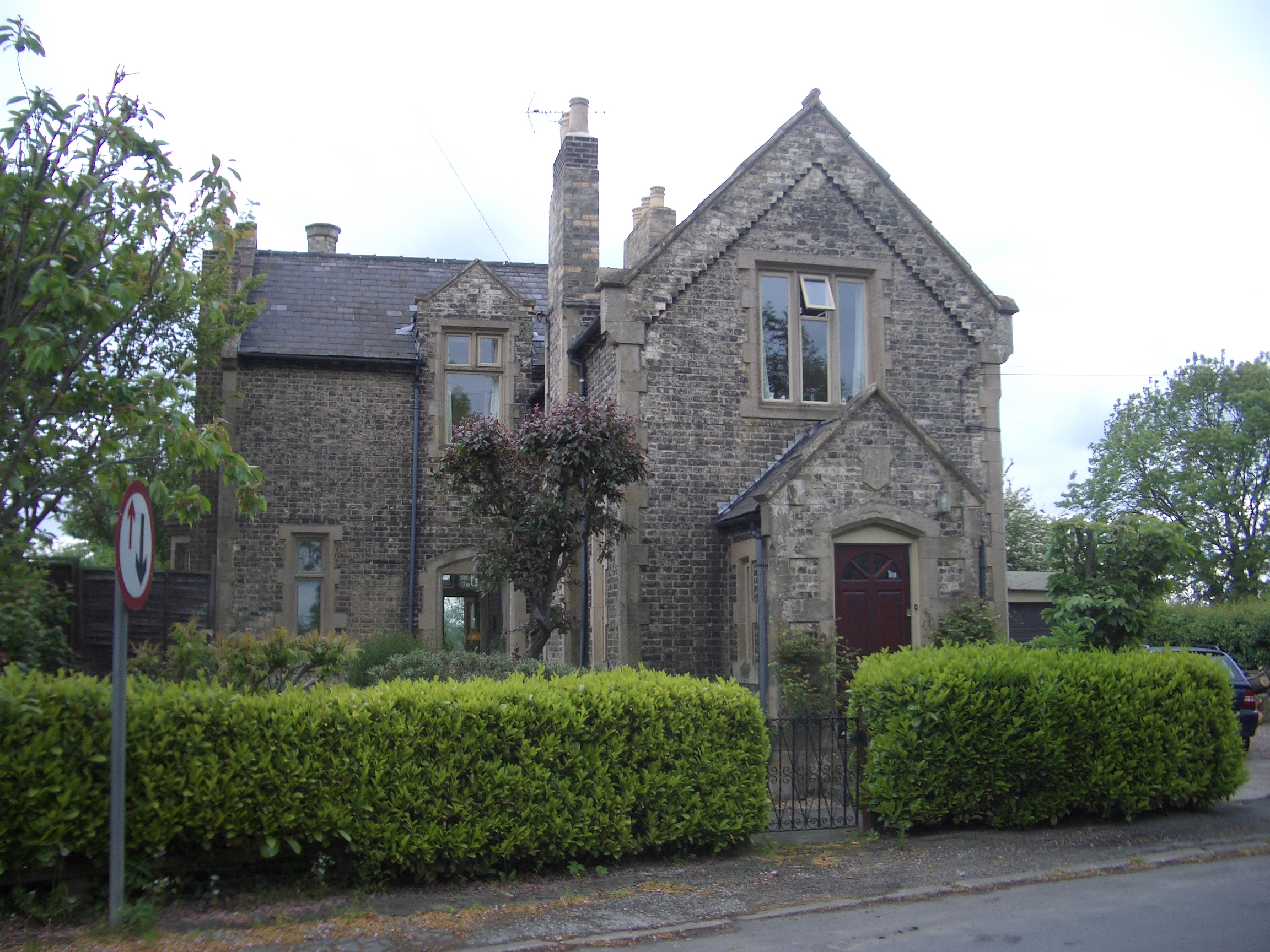
17 May 2008

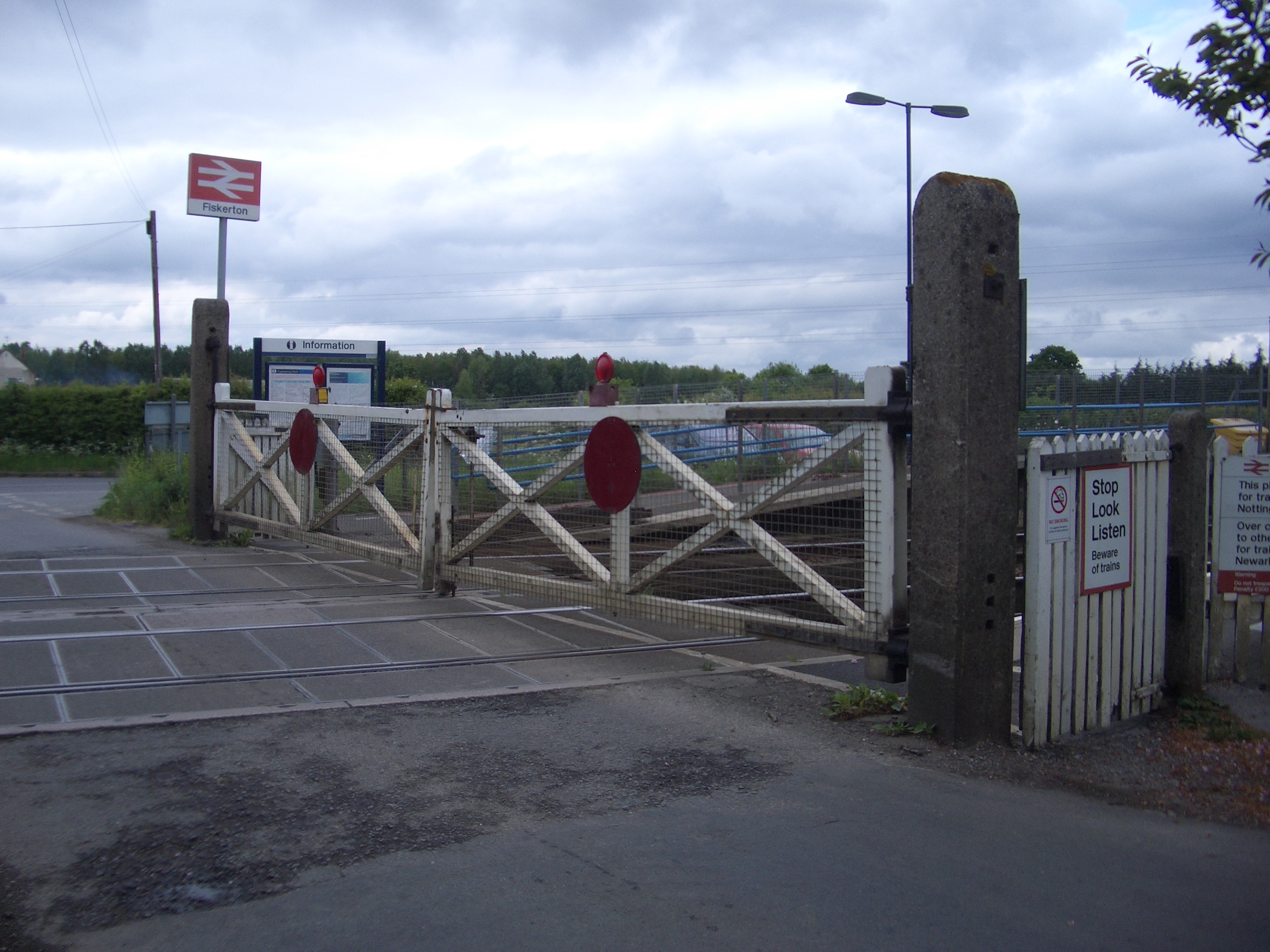
17 May 2008
