= Mansfield Bus Station =

Bus station in Nottinghamshire, England

Mansfield bus station
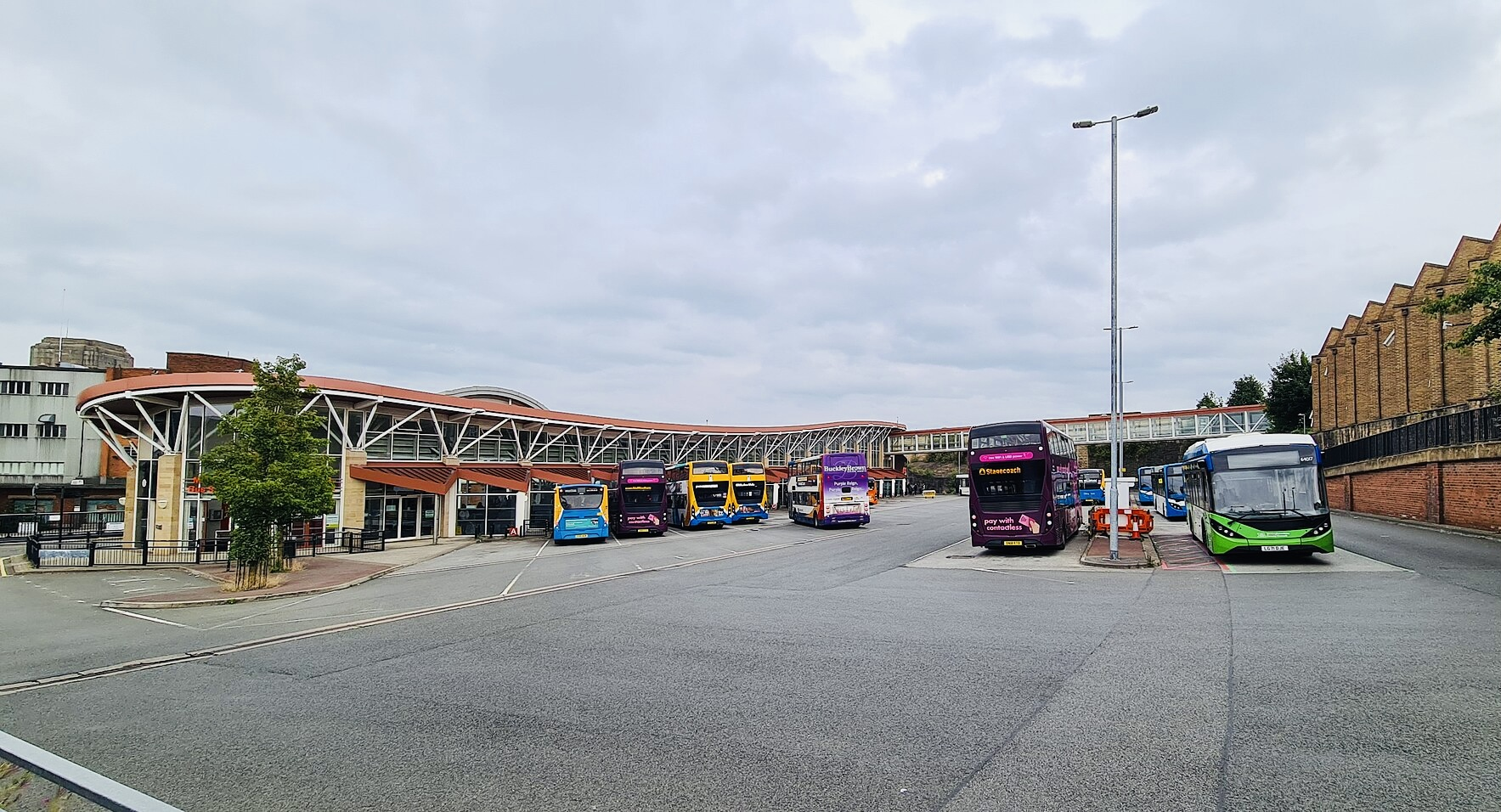

General information
- Location: Quaker Way, Mansfield, Nottinghamshire, NG18 1LP
- Coordinates: 53.14313°N 1.19799°W
- Bus operators: Stagecoach Mansfield; Trent Barton; National Express
- Connections: Mansfield

History
- Opened: 2013
Location

Mansfield bus station serves the town of Mansfield, in Nottinghamshire, England. Nottinghamshire County Council decided to relocate the town's former 1970s bus station nearer to the railway station, after the Robin Hood Line passenger service was re-established in 1995. The primary bus operators are Stagecoach in Mansfield, Trent Barton and National Express.

== History ==
The former Quaker Meeting House was located on part of the site of the new bus station. George Fox, the founder of the Quakers in 1647, lived in a cottage at the site of St Philip Neri Church on Chesterfield Road. It was at this time he started his ministry. The Mansfield Quaker Heritage Trail starts from the bus station, and leads to different sites in and around the town centre.

Nottinghamshire County Council under a Labour administration, planned to move the old bus station from Rosemary Street nearer to the railway station to create a transport interchange. Under a Conservative county administration from the May 2009 election, the project was approved.

The Department of Transport provided most of the finance with Nottinghamshire Council contributing £1.7 million. Planning permission was given to develop a new facility on the Station Road car park.

The new facility, with 16 bays, was built at a cost of £11 million and was opened on 31 March 2013.

== Facilities ==
The bus station is connected by a skybridge to Mansfield railway station. It has a shop, free wi-fi, accessible toilets and baby changing facilities.

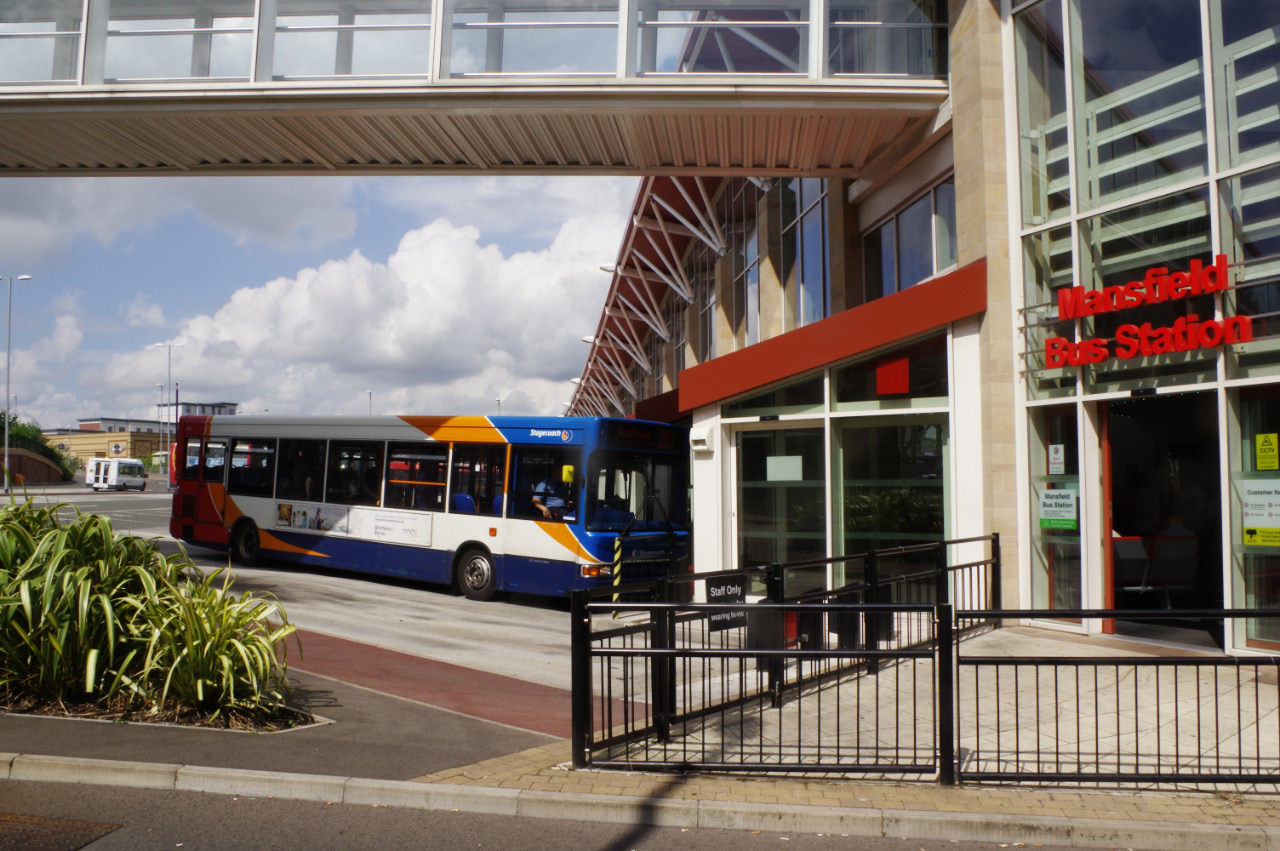
The entrance and skybridge

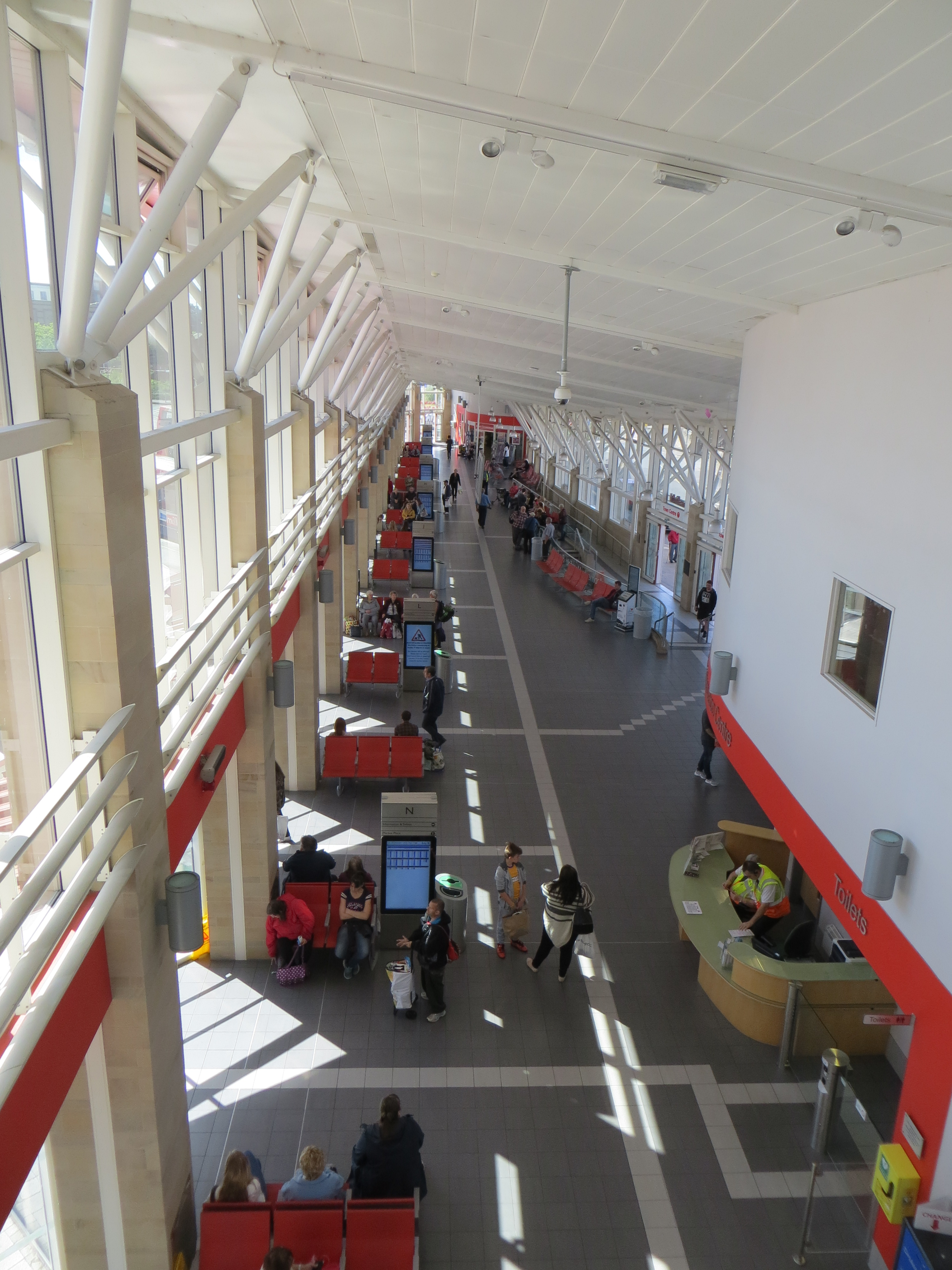
The interior
