= Farnsfield railway station =

Former railway station in Nottinghamshire, England

Coordinates: 53.109032°N 1.04197°W

Farnsfield
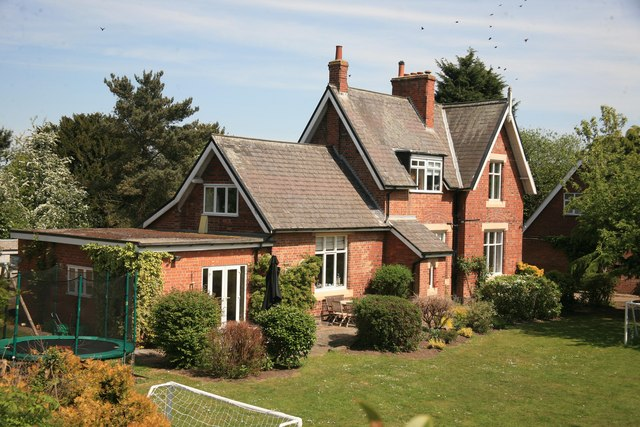
- Farnsfield Station House

General information
- Location: England
- Grid reference: SK641573

Other information
- Status: Disused

History
- Pre-grouping: Midland Railway
- Post-grouping: London, Midland and Scottish Railway

Key dates
- 1871: Opened
- 12 August 1929: Closed to passengers
- 25 June 1964: Closed for freight
Location

Farnsfield railway station was a railway station serving the village of Farnsfield, Nottinghamshire, England. It was on the Midland Railway's Rolleston Junction to Mansfield line.

== History ==
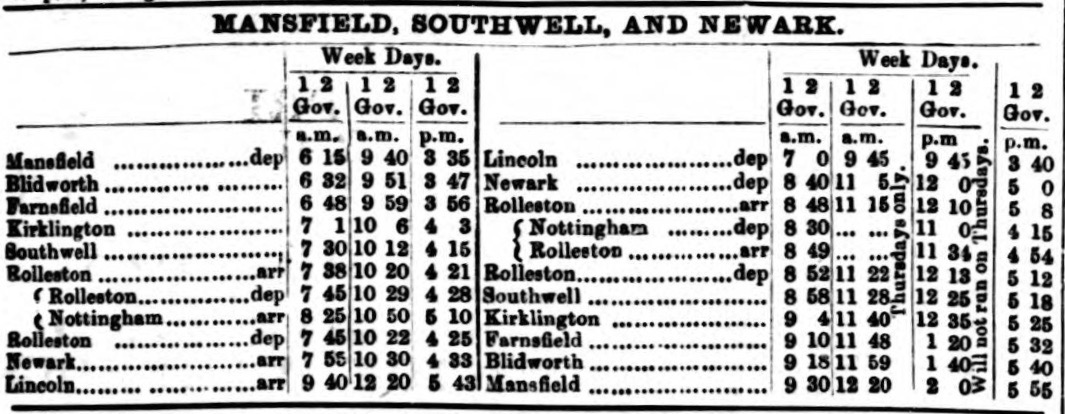
Timetable from Mansfield Reporter, 29 November 1878

The station opened in 1871 when the Midland Railway extended the existing Rollesdon Junction to Southwell line from Southwell to Mansfield.

The station closed to passengers on 12 August 1929 when the Mansfield to Southwell section, which passed through a mining area, closed to passengers. The railway replaced it with a road motor omnibus service provided in conjunction with Mansfield and District Tramways Limited connecting with the railway stations between Mansfield and Newark. Freight services continued until 25 June 1964.

== Present day ==
The station and goods shed remain as private residences. A branch of the Southwell Trail multi-user path passes through the station site, linking the A614 road to the main route of the trail just east of the station.

== Stationmasters ==
- Robert Nash until 1883
- John William Holden 1883 - 1908
- Charles Treharne Holden from 1908 (son of John W. Holden, also formerly station master at Holwell Junction)

Preceding station	Disused railways	Following station
Kirklington and Edingley; Line and station closed	Midland Railway; Rolleston Junction to Mansfield	Blidworth and Rainworth; Line and station closed
