= Sutton-in-Ashfield railway station =

Former railway station in Nottinghamshire, England

Sutton-in-Ashfield
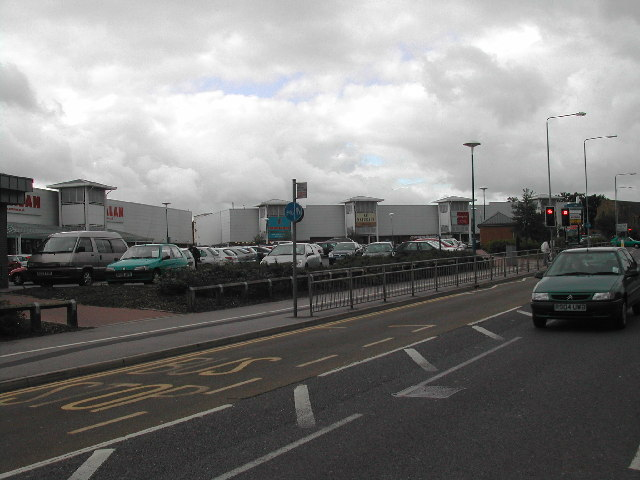
- The former station site in 2005 as a multi-outlet retail park

General information
- Location: Sutton-in-Ashfield, Nottinghamshire; England
- Coordinates: 53.1233°N 1.2572°W
- Platforms: 2

Other information
- Status: Disused

History
- Original company: Midland Railway
- Pre-grouping: Midland Railway
- Post-grouping: London Midland and Scottish Railway

Key dates
- 1 May 1893: Station opened
- 1 January 1917: station closed
- 9 July 1923: reopened
- 26 Sept 1949: Station closed for regular passenger service
- 1 October 1951: workmen service withdrawn
Location

Sutton-in-Ashfield railway station, sometimes referred to as "Sutton-in-Ashfield General", was a dead-end station on a short branch line from Sutton Junction in Sutton-in-Ashfield, Nottinghamshire, England. Located off Station Road and opened in 1893, it offered a service with arrival much closer to Sutton-in-Ashfield town centre.

It was one of 4 stations that served to settlement of Sutton in Ashfield. The two Midland Stations (Sutton Junction and the branch line to Sutton in Ashfield). Both long gone; the branch line station now has a Matalan store where it once stood. Then there was the Great Northern station which has a few remains near Asda in the middle of town and lastly, Sutton Central station which was built by the Great Central railway and is now under the A38 bypass.

The short branch-line ride, was known as the Penny Emma because it cost one pre-decimal penny to travel along the MR (Emma)to Sutton Junction station. It became popular with locals and particularly as a children's treat. The name 'Penny Emma Way' was applied when creating a link road near to the rail line and modern-day Sutton in Ashfield station on the Robin Hood Line service which uses the same Midland Railway line from Nottingham as it did before.

The Great Northern railway station was located nearby.

== History ==
Opened by the Midland Railway, it became part of the London, Midland and Scottish Railway during the Grouping of 1923. The station then passed on to the London Midland Region of British Railways on nationalisation in 1948, and was in use until 1951. Afterwards the station was demolished and the area redeveloped.

=== Stationmasters ===
- Charles Snell 1894 - 1905 (formerly station master at Sutton Junction)
- Robert Herbert 1905 - 1912
- Horace Wroughton 1912 - ca. 1917
- E.S. French from 1937 (formerly station master at Market Rasen)

== The site today ==
The station site was demolished and used for retail motor trade purposes by dealership Blackton Ford, then was later redeveloped as Portland Retail Park, a multi-outlet shopping parade, with hardly any evidence of the railway ever being there.

The retail park was later renamed "The Broad Centre", owned by BBC Pension Trust.

Former Services

Preceding station	Disused railways	Following station
Sutton Junction	Midland Railway (Sutton Branch)	Terminus
