= Kirklington and Edingley railway station =

Former railway station in Nottinghamshire, England

Coordinates: 53.102771°N 0.991475°W

Kirklington and Edingley
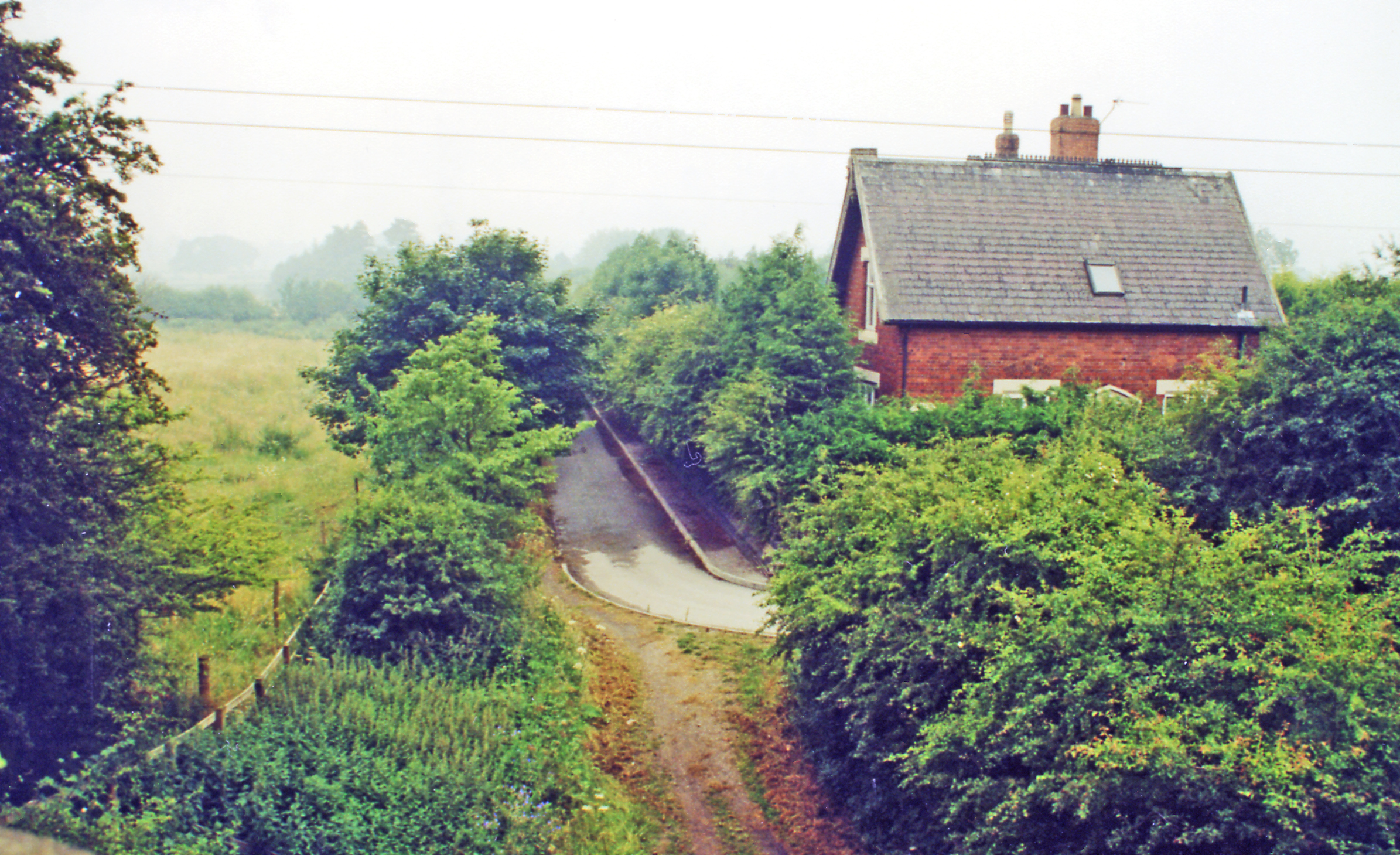
- Kirklington and Edingley railway station in 2008

General information
- Location: England
- Grid reference: SK675566

Other information
- Status: Disused

History
- Pre-grouping: Midland Railway
- Post-grouping: London, Midland and Scottish Railway

Key dates
- 1871: Opened
- 12 August 1929: Closed to passengers
- 25 May 1964: Closed for freight
Location

Kirklington and Edingley railway station was a railway station serving the villages of Edingley and Kirklington in Nottinghamshire, England. It was on the Midland Railway's Rolleston Junction to Mansfield line.

== History ==
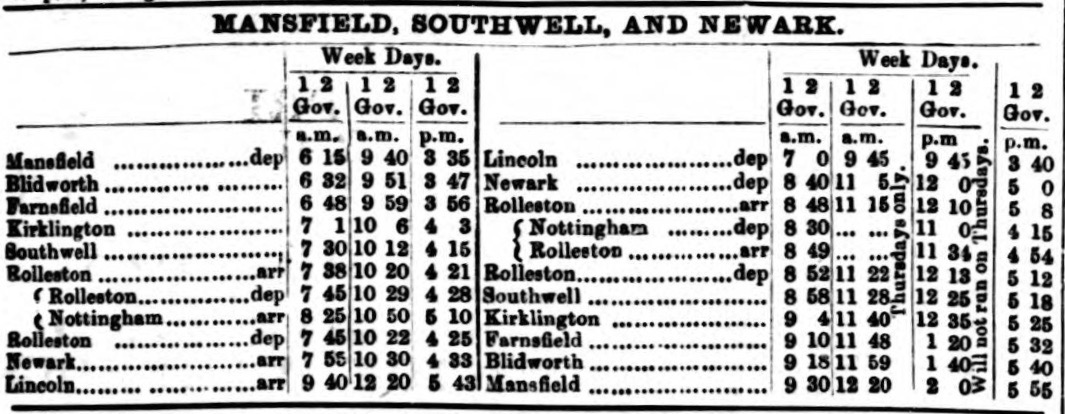
Timetable from Mansfield Reporter, 29 November 1878

The station opened in 1871 when the Midland Railway extended the existing Rollesdon Junction to Southwell line from Southwell to Mansfield. The design of building was identical to that used five years earlier for Longstone, Millers Dale (old), Peak Forest, Chinley (old) and Bugsworth stations. The only visible differences were that brick was used rather than stone, and a hip on the main building roof was omitted.

Shortly after opening the timetable comprised 3 trains from Mansfield to Lincoln per day, and 4 trains from Lincoln to Mansfield.

The station closed to passengers on 12 August 1929 when the Mansfield to Southwell section, which passed through a mining area closed to passengers in 1929. The railway replaced it with a road motor omnibus service provided in conjunction with the Mansfield and District Tramways Limited connecting with the railway stations between Mansfield and Newark. Freight services continued until 25 May 1964.

== Present day ==
The station and platform remain. The Southwell Trail multi-user path passes through the station site.

== Stationmasters ==
- John Bettinson 1871 - 1891
- Albert Ernest Whitworth 1892 - 1926

Preceding station	Disused railways	Following station
Southwell; Line and station closed	Midland Railway; Rolleston Junction to Mansfield	Farnsfield; Line and station closed
