= Kirkby-in-Ashfield East railway station =

Former railway station in Nottinghamshire, England

Kirkby-in-Ashfield East
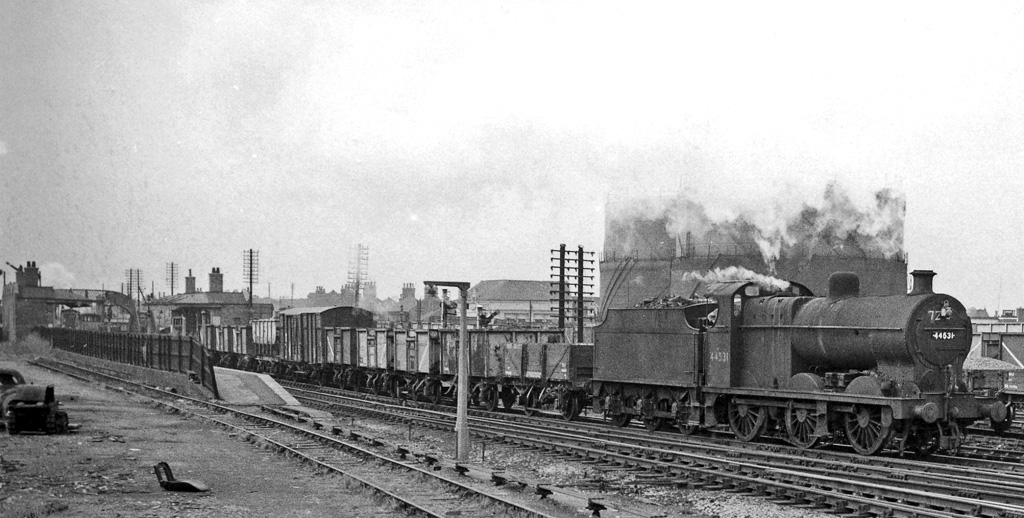

General information
- Location: Kirkby-in-Ashfield, Nottinghamshire; England
- Coordinates: 53.0998°N 1.2485°W
- Platforms: 2

Other information
- Status: Disused

History
- Original company: Midland Railway
- Pre-grouping: Midland Railway
- Post-grouping: London Midland and Scottish Railway

Key dates
- 2 October 1848: Station opens
- 12 October 1964: regular passenger services withdrawn
- 6 September 1965: unadvertised workmens service withdrawn
Location

Kirkby-in-Ashfield East railway station was a station in Kirkby-in-Ashfield, Nottinghamshire. It was opened in 1848, and was located on the Midland Railway's Mansfield Branch Line (Now the Robin Hood Line). It was one of three stations that served the town. The others were both Kirkby-in-Ashfield Central and Kirkby Bentinck. The station was replaced by the modern-day station of the same name (minus the East name).

== History ==
Opened by the Midland Railway, it became part of the London, Midland and Scottish Railway during the Grouping of 1923. The station then passed on to the London Midland Region of British Railways on nationalisation in 1948, the station survived use until 1965.

=== Stationmasters ===
- S. Osman 1873 - 1874 (resigned 30 June 1874)
- John Mercer 1874 - 1890 (formerly station master at Worthington)
- William Tunn 1890 - 1896 (formerly station master at Fiskerton)
- Henry St. John Newell 1896 - 1901 (committed suicide 23 October 1901)
- Albert William Niblett 1902 - 1910
- A. Follows 1910 - 1913 (afterwards station master at Barrow Hill and Staveley Works)
- E.H. Allen 1913 - 1925 (formerly station master at Swinderby, afterwards station master at Avonmouth)
- W. Edwards from 1939 (formerly station master at Whitwell)

== The site today ==
The Robin Hood Line was revived in the 1990s following the closure of the Mansfield Railway through the town and the freight-only route was then reused. However, the new station was opened 770 yards (700 m) east from the former station site. Nothing remains of the station site as it has been redeveloped including the trackbed. The line was diverted onto the alignment of the former Great Northern Railway to the new Kirkby-in-Ashfield station.

Former Services

Preceding station	Historical railways	Following station
Annesley; Line open, station closed	Midland Railway; Nottingham to Worksop	Sutton Junction; Line open, station closed
Pinxton and Selston; Line open, station closed	Midland Railway; Mansfield & Pinxton Railway	Sutton Junction; Line open, station closed
