= Pinxton and Selston railway station =

Former railway station in Nottinghamshire, England

Coordinates: 53°05′10″N 1°18′34″W

Pinxton and Selston

General information
- Location: Pinxton, Bolsover, Derbyshire; England
- Platforms: 2

Other information
- Status: Disused

History
- Original company: Midland Railway
- Pre-grouping: Midland Railway
- Post-grouping: London Midland and Scottish Railway

Key dates
- 1 December 1851: Station opens
- 16 June 1947: Station closes to regular passenger traffic
- 1963: closed completely
Location

Pinxton and Selston railway station served the villages of Pinxton, Derbyshire and Selston, Nottinghamshire. It was located on the Midland Railway's Mansfield Branch Line (now the Robin Hood Line). It was one of three stations that served the village of Pinxton. The others were Pinxton South and Pye Hill and Somercotes.

== History ==
Opened by the Midland Railway in 1851, it became part of the London, Midland and Scottish Railway during the Grouping of 1923. The station closed to regular passenger traffic in 1947 but continued in use for summer excursions until 1963.

== Stationmasters ==
- Job Wild ca. 1857 - 1864
- Lucas Sutton 1864 - 1865 (formerly station mater at Coxbench)
- E. Barber 1865 - 1875 (afterwards station master at Creswell)
- Joseph Amos 1875 - 1877
- E. Richards 1877 - 1880
- Frederick Witts 1880 - 1884 (afterwards station master at Water Orton)
- W. Marston 1884 - 1887 (formerly station master at Watnall)
- F. Jackson 1887 - 1888 (formerly station master at Short Heath)
- Joseph Mounsey 1888 - 1898 (formerly station master at Watnall)
- G. Ainge 1898 - 1900
- W. J. Tanner 1900 - 1908 (formerly station master at Heanor)
- William Tunn 1908 - 1914 (formerly station master at Butterley, afterwards station master at Alfreton)
- W.A. Bennett 1914 - 1918 (afterwards station master at Leagrave)
- William Wadeson 1918 - ca. 1925 (formerly station master at Thornton-in-Craven)

== The site today ==
The Robin Hood Line was revived in the 1990s following the closure of the Mansfield Railway through the town and the freight-only route was then reused. However, the section from Kirkby to Langley Mill was not reopened to passengers and is in use for freight only. Nothing remains of Pinxton and Selston station.

As part of the Restoring Your Railway fund there are plans to reopen the station and the line to passengers. The line through the station would reopen first with a later stage to reopen the station.

Former Services

Preceding station	Disused railways	Following station
Pye Bridge	Midland Railway; Mansfield & Pinxton Railway	Kirkby-in-Ashfield East
