= Southwell Trail =

Rail trail in Nottinghamshire, England

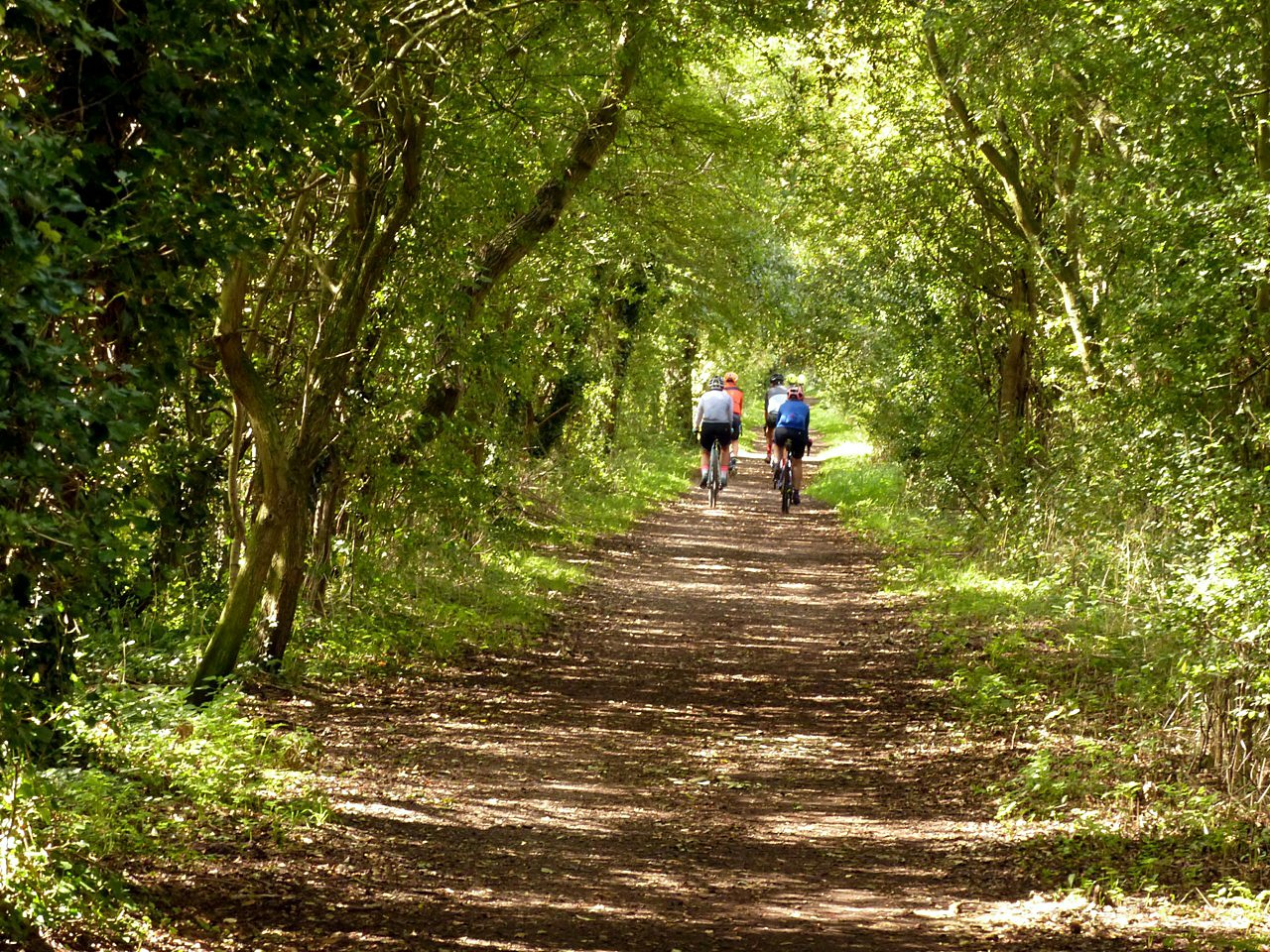
- The trail
- Length: 7.5 mi (12.1 km)
- Location: Nottinghamshire
- Trailheads: Bilsthorpe, Farnsfield, Kirklington, Southwell
- Use: Bridleway, cycle path and footpath
- Season: All year round
- Maintainer: Nottinghamshire County Council

The Southwell Trail is a 7.5-mile (12.1 km) shared-use path that links Bilsthorpe with Southwell, in Nottinghamshire, England. It uses parts of the track bed of two former railway lines and has been designated as a Local Nature Reserve.

== History ==
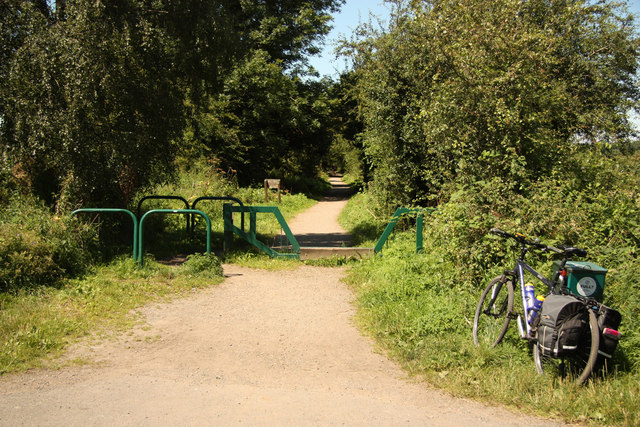
The trail at Maythorne

The section of the trail from Farnsfield to Southwell was opened as a railway in 1871, when the Midland Railway built a line connecting Southwell with Mansfield. This line, together with a pre-existing line between Southwell and Rolleston, formed the Rolleston Junction to Mansfield railway line, which carried both freight and passenger traffic.

The line between Mansfield and Southwell closed to passengers in 1929, but continued to be heavily used by freight trains, especially to and from the collieries near Mansfield. In 1931, a new freight line was opened from Farnsfield to Ollerton, via Bilsthorpe, and it is this route of this line that is used by the Bilsthorpe to Farnsfield section of the trail. However, by 1968, all of the lines used by the trail had closed completely.

In the early 1970s, Nottinghamshire County Council purchased the section of the line from Southwell to Farnsfield and beyond to the crossing of the A614, together with the section of the Ollerton branch as far as Bilsthorpe.

This was converted into the Southwell Trail, initially as a bridleway. In 2005–6, the trail was resurfaced and converted into a shared-use path.

== Route ==
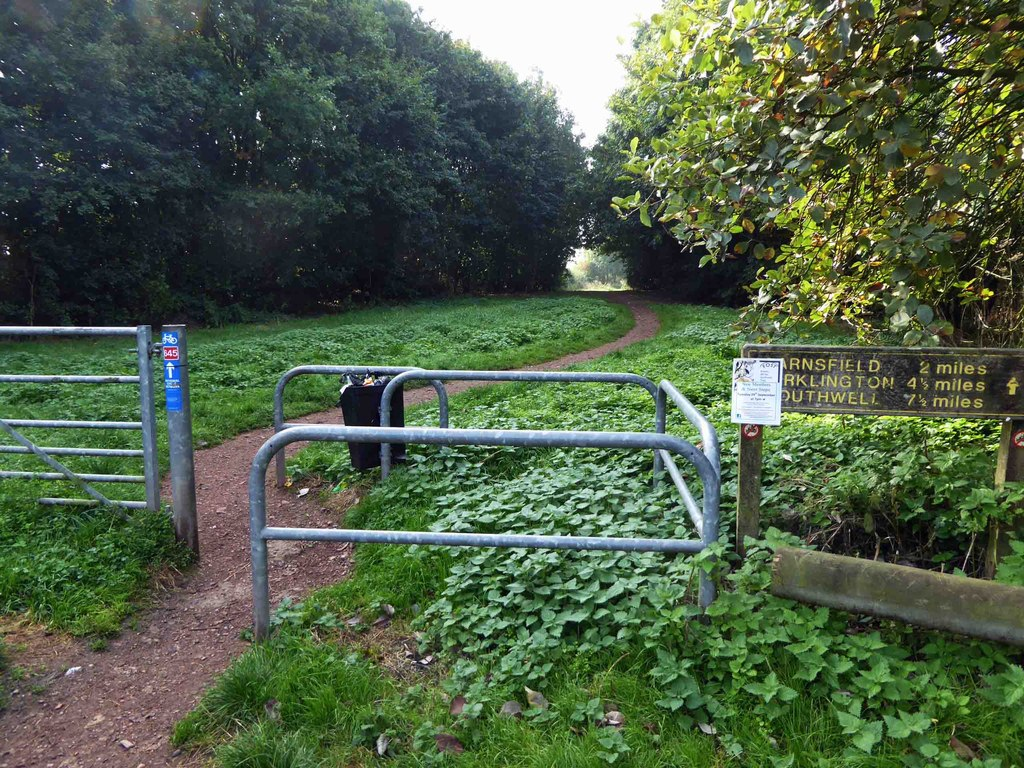
The trail at Bilsthorpe

The trail starts at Forest Link in Billsthorpe, from where a quiet on-road route is signed to the Bilsthorpe Line Multi-User Route. From here, the trail heads south to the site of Farnsfield station. An access path heads west from here to the A614, whilst the trail proper heads east to the site of Kirklington station. The trail turns south-east, past the historic mill and hamlet of Maythorne to reach its terminus at the site of Southwell station.

Between Kirklington station and Maythorne, the Southwell Trail shares its route with the Robin Hood Way, a waymarked long-distance footpath that links many places with connections to Robin Hood.

== Amenities ==
There are car parks at Forest Link in Billsthorpe and at the three former station sites of Farnsfield, Kirklington and Southwell. At Southwell, there is a public house, the Final Whistle, next to the end of the trail, which is about 0.5 miles (0.8 km) from the town centre and its Minster.
