= Sutton Parkway railway station =

Railway station in Nottinghamshire, England

Coordinates: 53°06′50″N 01°14′45″W

Sutton Parkway
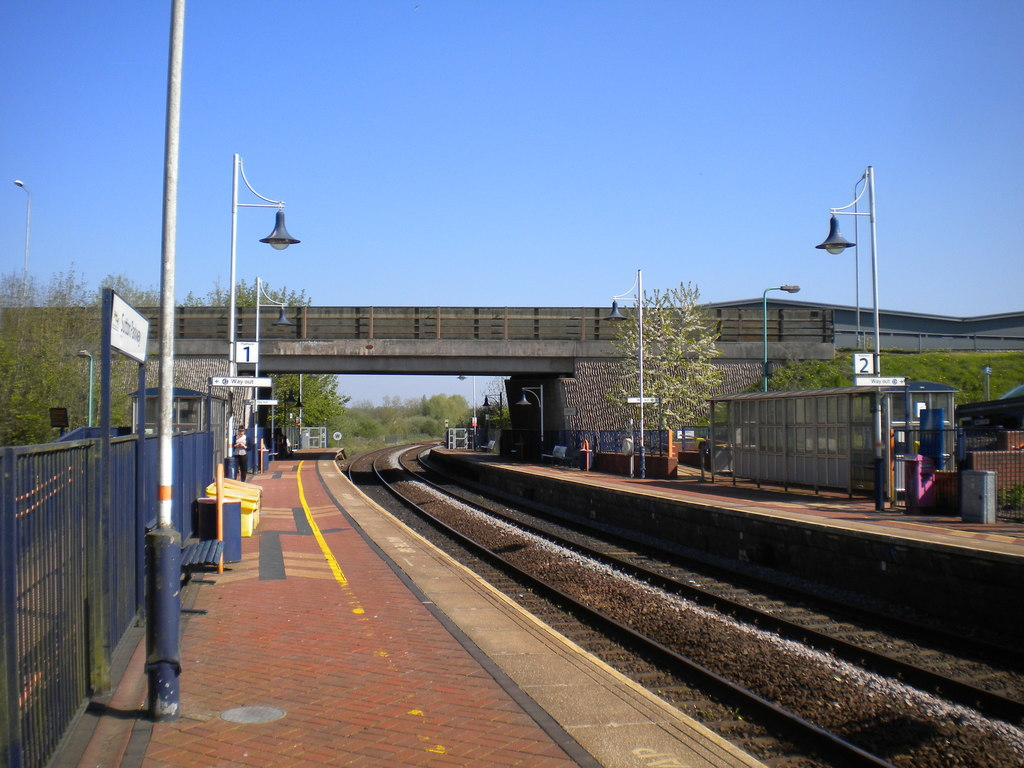
- The platforms at Sutton Parkway

General information
- Location: Kirkby-in-Ashfield, Ashfield; England
- Grid reference: SK505576
- Manager: East Midlands Railway
- Platforms: 2

Other information
- Station code: SPK
- Classification: DfT category F1

History
- Opened: 1995

Passengers
- 2020/21: ▼37,796
- 2021/22: ▲111,112
- 2022/23: ▲132,092
- 2023/24: ▲139,986
- 2024/25: ▲141,302
Location
Notes
- Passenger statistics from the Office of Rail and Road

Sutton Parkway railway station serves the town of Sutton-in-Ashfield in Nottinghamshire, England. The station is about 1/2 mile (800 m) south of the location of the former Sutton Junction station and 14 miles (23 km) north of Nottingham on the Robin Hood Line.

== History ==
The £44m Automated Distribution and Manufacturing Centre (ADMC) is being built next to the station. The scheme is partnered with Nottingham Trent University, and a local college.

== Services ==
All services at Sutton Parkway are operated by East Midlands Railway.

During the weekday off-peak and on Saturdays, the station is generally served by an hourly service northbound to Worksop and southbound to Nottingham. During the peak hours, the station is also served by an additional two trains per day between Nottingham and Mansfield Woodhouse.

On Sundays, the station is served by a two-hourly service between Nottingham and Mansfield Woodhouse, with no service to Worksop. Sunday services to Worksop are due to recommence at the station during the life of the East Midlands franchise.

Preceding station	National Rail	Following station
Kirkby-in-Ashfield	East Midlands Railway Robin Hood Line	Mansfield

== Facilities ==
Access to the platforms is at street level with car parks located on both sides of the platforms given excellent access for the disabled.

There are no toilet facilities at this station.

== Local transport connections ==
The station is located more than 2 miles (3.2 km) from the centre of town and is generally used as a park and ride station. There are two hourly bus services (90 to Ripley and Mansfield and 33 to Ilkeston and Mansfield) and one half-hourly bus service (3C to Nottingham and Mansfield) operated from outside the station by Trentbarton. There are buses between Kirkby-in-Ashfield railway station and Sutton-in-Ashfield itself.

There is no taxi rank at the station.
