= Rolleston railway station =

Railway station in Nottinghamshire, England

Coordinates: 53°03′55″N 0°53′59″W

Rolleston
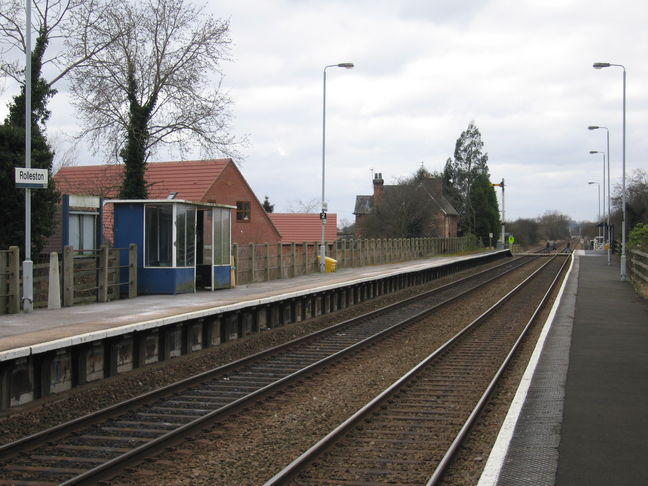
- Looking west towards the shelter, old station house and level crossing

General information
- Location: Rolleston, Newark and Sherwood, Nottinghamshire; England
- Grid reference: SK737525
- Manager: East Midlands Railway
- Platforms: 2

Other information
- Station code: ROL
- Classification: DfT category F2

History
- Opened: 1846

Passengers
- 2021/22: ▲2,578
- 2022/23: ▲3,454
- 2023/24: ▼3,124
- 2024/25: ▲4,602
- 2025/26: ▲4,940
Location
Notes
- Passenger statistics from the Office of Rail and Road

Rolleston station is a stop on the Nottingham to Lincoln Line. It is located around half a mile from the small village of Rolleston, one of the Trent-side villages near Southwell in Nottinghamshire, England. The station adjoins Southwell Racecourse.

== History ==
The station was opened on 4 August 1846, with services running between Nottingham and Lincoln.

The branch line to Southwell was opened in 1847, but the Midland Railway suspended passenger services for a while during the 1850s; these were restored from 1 August 1860 as the Midland Railway saw demand for a planned new line through Southwell to Mansfield.

On Saturday 5 December 1874, John Bradwell, senior churchwarden at Southwell Minster, stopped on the foot crossing. As he was very deaf, he did not hear an approaching train which knocked him down. The stationmaster arranged for him to be taken by train to Newark-on-Trent but, just as the local surgeon arrived at Newark Castle station, the victim had died from his injuries. The inquest recommended that a footbridge be installed.

The station was previously known as Rolleston Junction, as it used to be the junction for the railway line to Southwell and Mansfield, which in its latter years played host to the Southwell Paddy service. This line closed to passengers in June 1959, although the service beyond Southwell had ended three decades earlier. The name also avoided confusion with Rolleston-on-Dove railway station on the line between Burton upon Trent and Egginton Junction.

=== Stationmasters ===
- Edward Holmes until 1862
- J. Hey 1862–1864
- J.W. Jones 1864
- William Smedley c. 1864
- Thomas Norris Found 1871–1899
- Thomas England 1899 – c. 1914
- William George Dudderidge 1918–1936 (formerly stationmaster at Yeadon, Yorkshire; from 1925 also stationmaster at Fiskerton; from 1932 also stationmaster at Bleasby)
- Arnold Foster 1936–1942
- H.J. Lane until 1947
- F.W.E. Clarke from 1947 (formerly stationmaster at Widmerpool)
- W.J. Smith c. 1954

== Facilities ==
Rolleston is on the Nottingham to Lincoln Line; its neighbouring stations are Newark Castle, around 4 miles east, and Fiskerton, around 3/4 mile west. The station is owned by Network Rail and managed by East Midlands Railway, who provide services to the station.

The station is unstaffed and offers limited facilities other than two shelters, bicycle storage, timetables and modern help points. The full range of tickets can be purchased from the guard on the train at no extra cost, as there are no retail facilities at this station.

== Services ==
All services at Rolleston are operated by East Midlands Railway.

The typical off-peak service is:

- 1 train every 2 hours to Crewe via Nottingham
- 1 train every 2 hours to Lincoln

There is also a two-hourly service on Sundays: trains run between Matlock, Derby, Nottingham, Lincoln and Grimsby with no service to Crewe.

Preceding station	National Rail	Following station
Fiskerton	East Midlands Railway Nottingham to Lincoln Line	Newark Castle
	Disused railways	
Terminus	Midland Railway Rolleston Junction to Mansfield	Southwell Line and station closed
