= Kirkby-in-Ashfield railway station =

Railway station in Nottinghamshire, England

Coordinates: 53°06′01″N 01°15′11″W

Kirkby-in-Ashfield
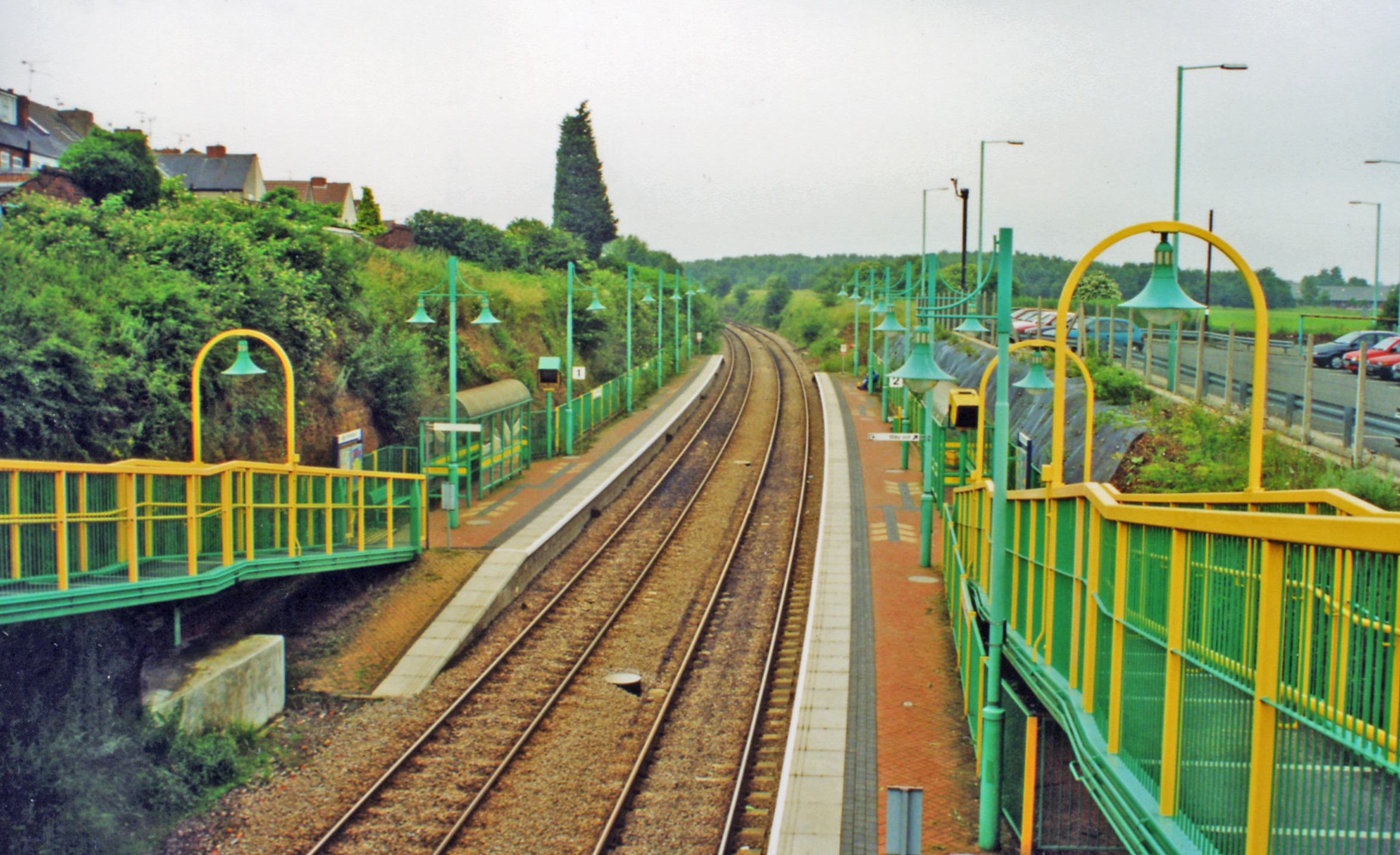

General information
- Location: Kirkby-in-Ashfield, Ashfield; England
- Grid reference: SK500561
- Managed by: East Midlands Railway
- Platforms: 2

Other information
- Station code: KKB
- Classification: DfT category F2

History
- Opened: November 1996

Passengers
- 2020/21: ▼34,602
- 2021/22: ▲89,714
- 2022/23: ▲0.106 million
- 2023/24: ▲0.115 million
- 2024/25: ▲0.122 million
Location
Notes
- Passenger statistics from the Office of Rail and Road

Kirkby-in-Ashfield railway station serves the town of Kirkby-in-Ashfield in Nottinghamshire, England. The station is on the Robin Hood Line and is operated by East Midlands Railway between Nottingham and Worksop.

== History ==
Kirkby-in-Ashfield was served by three railway stations:

- Kirkby-in-Ashfield Central station (closed 1962) was located 700m to the west of the present station on the former Great Central Railway Mansfield Central branch.
- Kirkby-in-Ashfield East station (closed 1964) was 350m to the east of the present station on the former Midland Railway Nottingham to Worksop line.
- Kirkby Bentinck station (closed 1963) was located in Bentinck Town to the south west of Kirkby-in-Ashfield, on the former Great Central Railway London to Manchester main line.

The closures of these lines left the area with no passenger rail services until the reopening of the former Midland Railway route, now known as the 'Robin Hood Line', in the 1990s. However, by this time British Rail had abandoned the original Midland alignment through Kirkby-in-Ashfield town centre, and the remaining freight trains instead passed through the town by way of a short remnant of yet another line. The town's new station is therefore located on part of the former Great Northern Railway Nottingham to Shirebrook line, which had not previously had a station at this location.

== Services ==
All services at Kirkby-in-Ashfield are operated by East Midlands Railway.

During the weekday off-peak and on Saturdays, the station is generally served by an hourly service northbound to Worksop and southbound to Nottingham. During the peak hours, the station is also served by an additional two trains per day between Nottingham and Mansfield Woodhouse.

On Sundays, the station is served by a two-hourly service between Nottingham and Mansfield Woodhouse, with no service to Worksop. Sunday services to Worksop are due to recommence at the station during the life of the East Midlands franchise.

Preceding station	National Rail	Following station
Newstead	East Midlands Railway Robin Hood Line	Sutton Parkway

== Facilities ==
The station is located ¼ mile from the centre of town in a cutting around 40 feet below street level. Access to the platforms is via two ramps with a small number of steps so is not recommended for use by wheelchair passengers unless the operator of the chair is very fit.

There are no toilet facilities on this station.

== Local transport connections ==
There are regular bus service operating outside the station by Trent Barton to the local area but there is no taxi rank.

== Future ==
There are proposals to re-open the line between Kirkby-in-Ashfield and Pye Bridge in Derbyshire (which currently operate freight services only), which was initially proposed to provide a link with the formerly planned HS2 station at Toton. The proposed name for this re-opened line would be the Maid Marion Line.
