= Stagecoach in Mansfield =

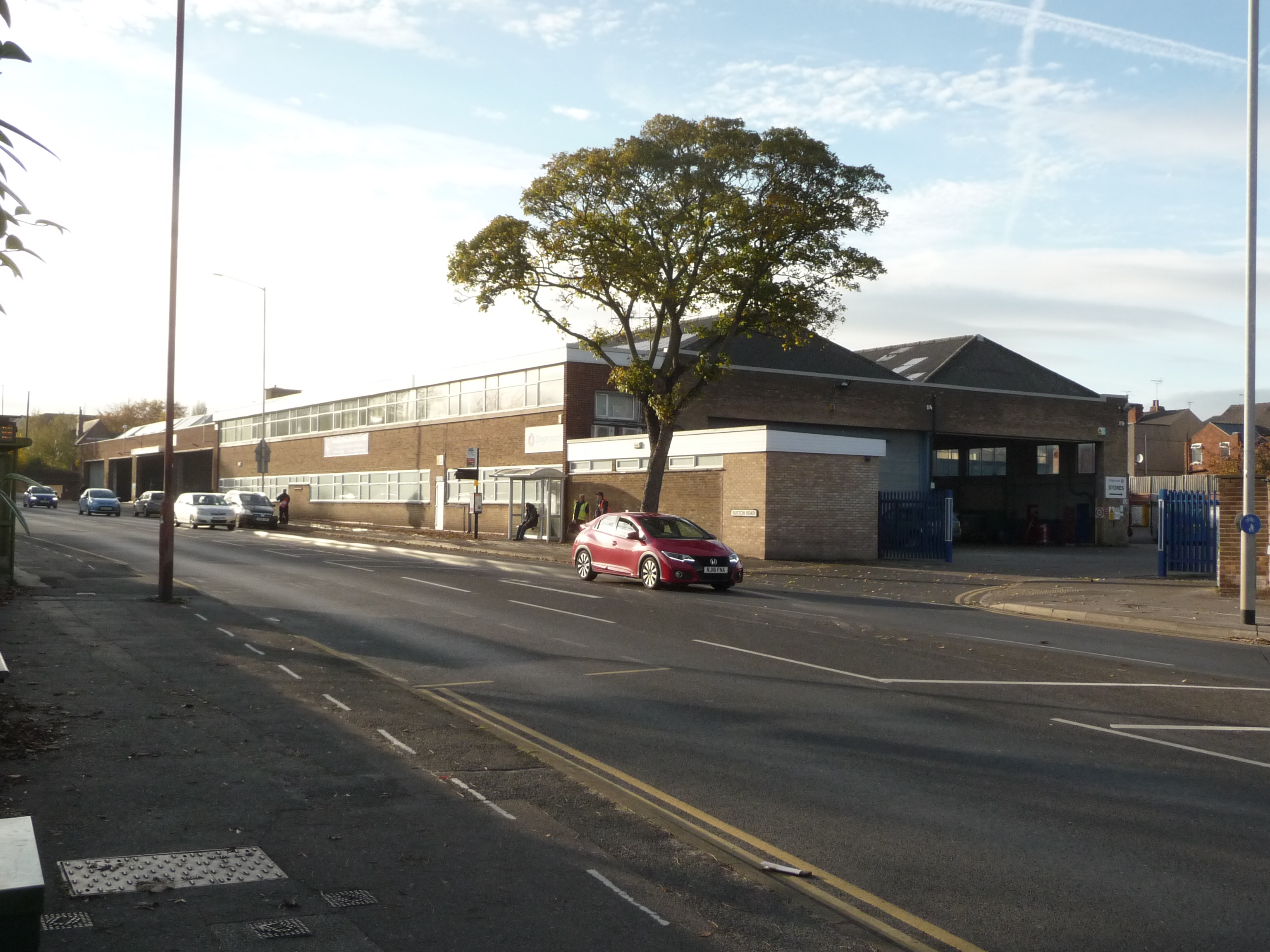
- Stagecoach depot, Sutton Road (A38), Mansfield, (formerly used by Mansfield District Traction) with offices, storage and maintenance facilities
- Parent: Stagecoach
- Founded: 1989
- Headquarters: Mansfield, Nottinghamshire
- Service area: Mansfield; Chesterfield; Sheffield; Nottingham; Newark-on-Trent; Shirebrook; Walesby
- Service type: Bus services
- Hubs: Mansfield Bus Station
- Depots: 1
- Website: www.stagecoachbus.com

Stagecoach in Mansfield is a bus operator providing bus services in Mansfield and surrounding areas. It is a subsidiary of Stagecoach East Midlands, a subdivision of the Stagecoach Group.

They have a fleet of around 100 buses made up of a variety of models from different eras. These include their older buses such as the ADL Enviro400 and the MAN Enviro 300 as well as their newer buses such as the ADL Enviro 400 and 200 MMC. They have around 200 employees who carry more than 6 million passengers per year, with a passenger increase of approximately 7%.

The Sutton Road bus depot, formerly tram shed, is where Stagecoach in Mansfield operate from. There are plans in place to demolish the site and rebuild the depot to prepare it for a modern fully electric fleet. This is set to begin towards the end of 2026.

As well as Mansfield, they also operate certain buses to Nottingham, Chesterfield, Sutton-in-Ashfield, Bolsover, Eckington, Sheffield, Langwith, Edwinstowe, and Newark-on-Trent. Although most routes operate all week, some routes do not operate on Sundays, and some routes only operate on Sundays. On bank holidays, a Sunday service is operated.

Stagecoach in Mansfield operate the 'pronto' service between Nottingham and Chesterfield via Mansfield. The service was previously operated using high-specification single deckers before it was upgraded to double-decker operation in a £3 million investment in 2018.

The service was previously jointly operated between Stagecoach and trentbarton; from 15 February 2020, trentbarton ceased operations on the route, resulting in Stagecoach now operating the entire 'pronto' network, coinciding with another £1.1 million investment of branded double-deckers to replace trentbarton's services.

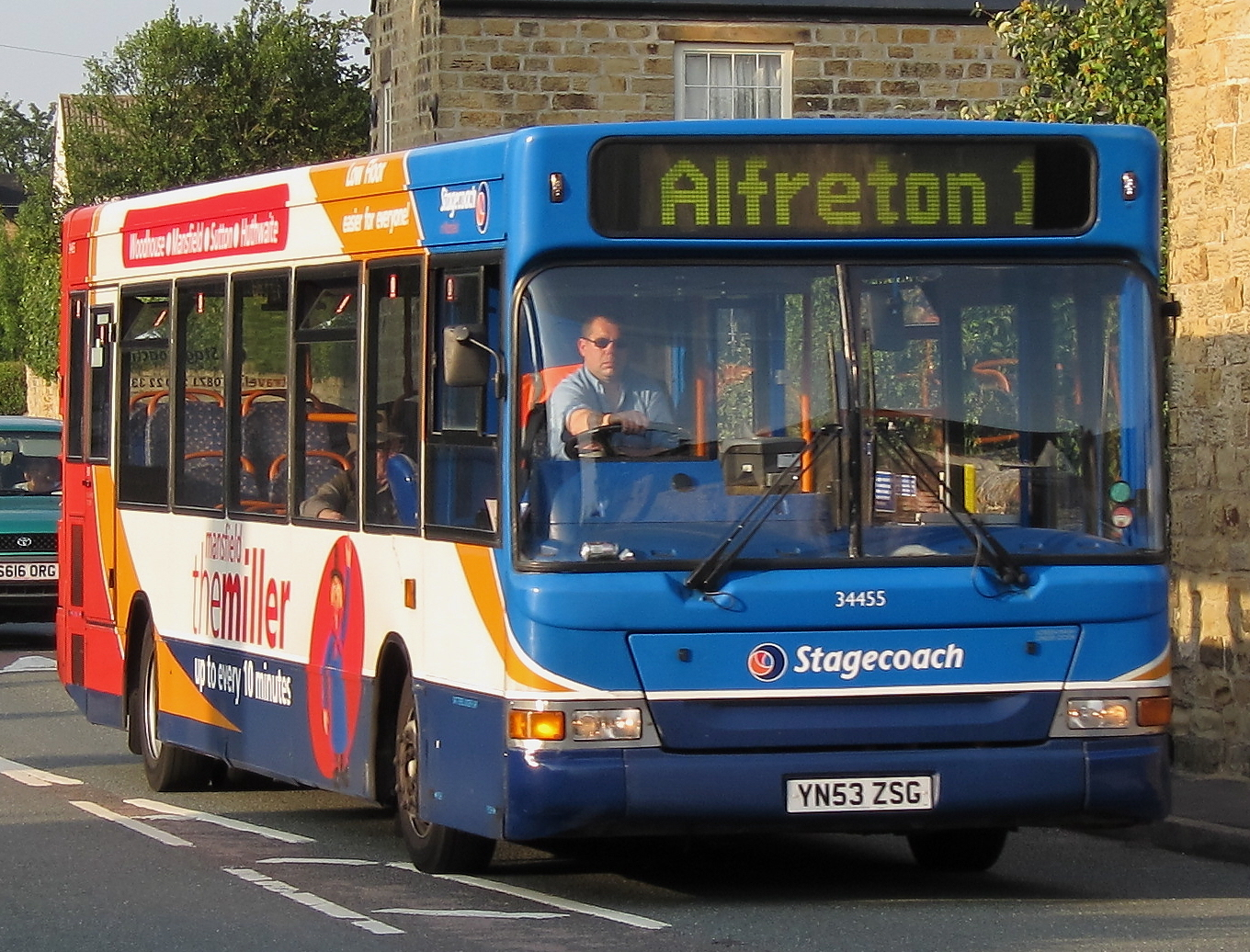
Plaxton Pointer 2 bodied Dennis Dart SLF in Tibshelf in 2011

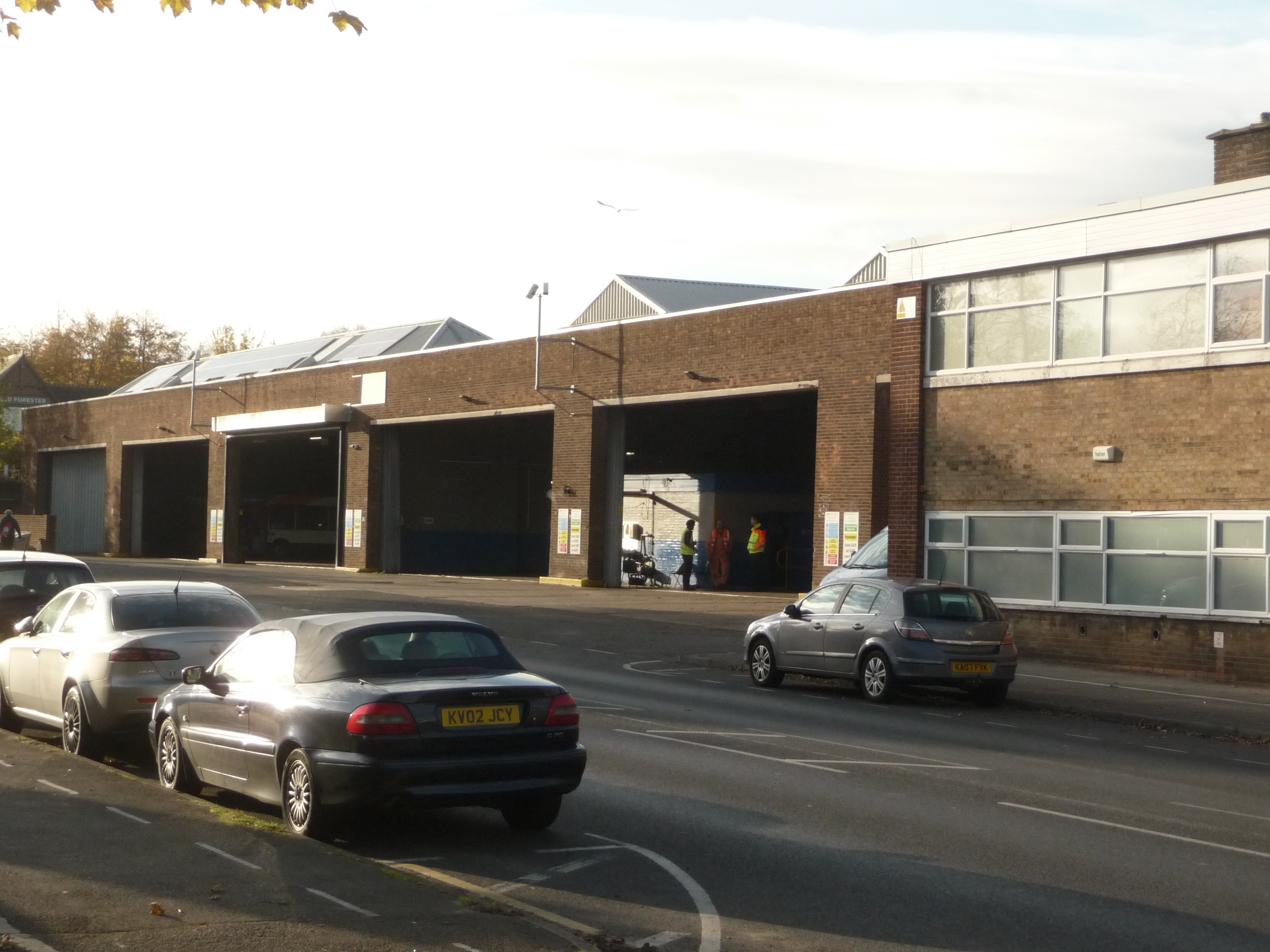
View of Mansfield depot showing entrance to garages off the main A38 road which ends a few hundred yards towards the town centre to the right

== Depot ==
- Mansfield (Sutton Road)
