= Sutton Junction railway station =

Former railway station in Nottinghamshire, England

Sutton Junction
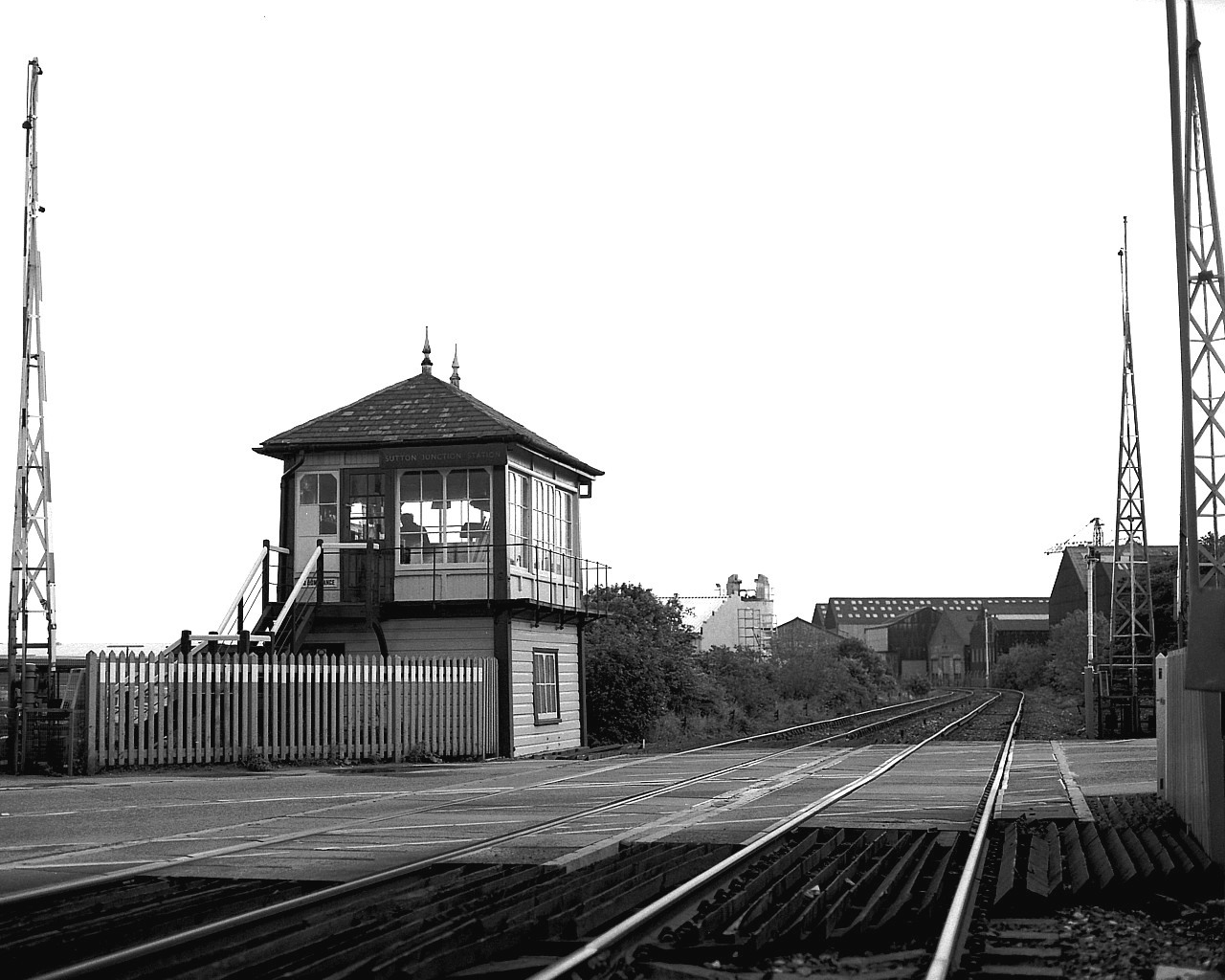
- Signal box on the other side of the level crossing from the old station site

General information
- Location: Sutton-in-Ashfield, Nottinghamshire; England
- Coordinates: 53.1206°N 1.2398°W
- Platforms: 2

Other information
- Status: Disused

History
- Original company: Midland Railway
- Pre-grouping: Midland Railway
- Post-grouping: London Midland and Scottish Railway

Key dates
- 1850: Station opens as "Sutton-in-Ashfield"
- 1890: Station renamed as "Sutton Junction"
- 12 October 1964: Station closed
- 1995: New station opened (800m) south of the former site
Location

Sutton Junction railway station was a station in Sutton-in-Ashfield, Nottinghamshire, England. It was opened in 1850, and was located on the Midland Railway's Mansfield Branch Line (now the Robin Hood Line). It was one of four stations that served the town. The others were Sutton-in-Ashfield Central, Sutton-in-Ashfield and Sutton-in-Ashfield Town. A modern-day facility was established on the same line known as Sutton Parkway railway station.

== History ==
Opened by the Midland Railway, it became part of the London, Midland and Scottish Railway during the Grouping of 1923. The station then passed on to the London Midland Region of British Railways on nationalisation in 1948, the station survived use until 1964. It closed on 10 October 1964 when passenger trains on the Nottingham - Kirkby - Sutton Junction - Mansfield - Worksop route ceased. The line remained open for freight (coal trains).

=== Stationmasters ===
From 1907 the station master's position was taken over by the stationmaster at Sutton-in-Ashfield

- W. Clay ca. 1860–1881
- William Tomblin 1881–1886
- Charles Snell 1886–1894 (afterwards station master at Sutton-in-Ashfield)
- Louis Elvidge 1894–1907

== The site today ==
Passenger services on the Robin Hood Line were revived in the 1990s and the freight-only route was then reused. However, the new station was opened 700m east from the former station site. Nothing remains of the station site. Only the lines are still in use.

Former Services

Preceding station	Historical railways	Following station
Kirkby-in-Ashfield East; Line open, station closed	Midland Railway; Nottingham to Worksop	Mansfield Town; Line and station open
Kirkby-in-Ashfield East; Line open, station closed	Midland Railway; Sutton Branch	Sutton-in-Ashfield; Line and station closed
