= Rolleston Junction–Mansfield line =

Disused railway line in Nottinghamshire, England

The Rolleston Junction to Mansfield line was a railway line in Nottinghamshire, England linking the village of Rolleston with Mansfield. Whilst parts of the line date back to 1847, it was opened throughout in 1871 by the Midland Railway; by the 1920s, the dominant traffic was to the collieries east of Mansfield. Through passenger services ceased in 1929 and the line was closed completely in 1983.

A section of the line is now part of the Southwell Trail, a multi-user pathway for walkers, cyclists and horseriders.

== Opening ==
The line first opened on 1 July 1847, as a short branch off the Nottingham and Lincoln line from Rolleston Junction to Southwell. The Midland Railway then extended the line to Mansfield on 3 April 1871, with intermediate passenger stations at Kirklington and Edingley, Farnsfield and Rainworth.

In the first few decades of the 20th century, a number of collieries opened in the area east of Mansfield and the railway was extended to serve them:

- Mansfield Colliery via Mansfield Colliery Junction (opened 11 January 1905, closed 18 July 1967)
- Rufford Colliery via Rufford Junction (opened 20 June 1912, closed 17 October 1983)
- Clipstone Colliery via Rufford Junction (opened spring 1929, closed 29 August 1983)
- Blidworth Colliery via Blidworth Junction (opened 21 December 1925, closed 24 June 1967).

On 30 November 1931, a branch to the LMS and LNER joint railway to Ollerton was opened. The line only ever served coal traffic and was closed south of Bilsthorpe on 7 September 1962.

== Closure ==
Passenger numbers declined through the first part of the 20th century and passenger service was ultimately withdrawn between Mansfield and Southwell on 12 August 1929. A shuttle service between Southwell and Rolleston Junction remained in high demand, with 17 trains per day operated by the Southwell Paddy, a single carriage pulled by a steam locomotive. This service was finally withdrawn on 16 June 1959.

Despite the lack of passenger traffic, the line remained popular with coal and other goods traffic until the 1960s. By 1968, the line had been closed from Rufford Junction to Rolleston Junction; the last section between Mansfield and Rufford Junction closed on 17 October 1983.

In the early 1970s, Nottinghamshire County Council purchased the section of the line from Southwell station to Farnsfield station and beyond to the crossing of the A614, together with the section of the Ollerton branch as far as Bilsthorpe. This was converted into the Southwell Trail, initially as a bridleway. In 2005-6, the trail was resurfaced and converted into a multi-user route.
