= Kirkby Bentinck railway station =

Former railway station in Nottinghamshire, England

Kirkby Bentinck
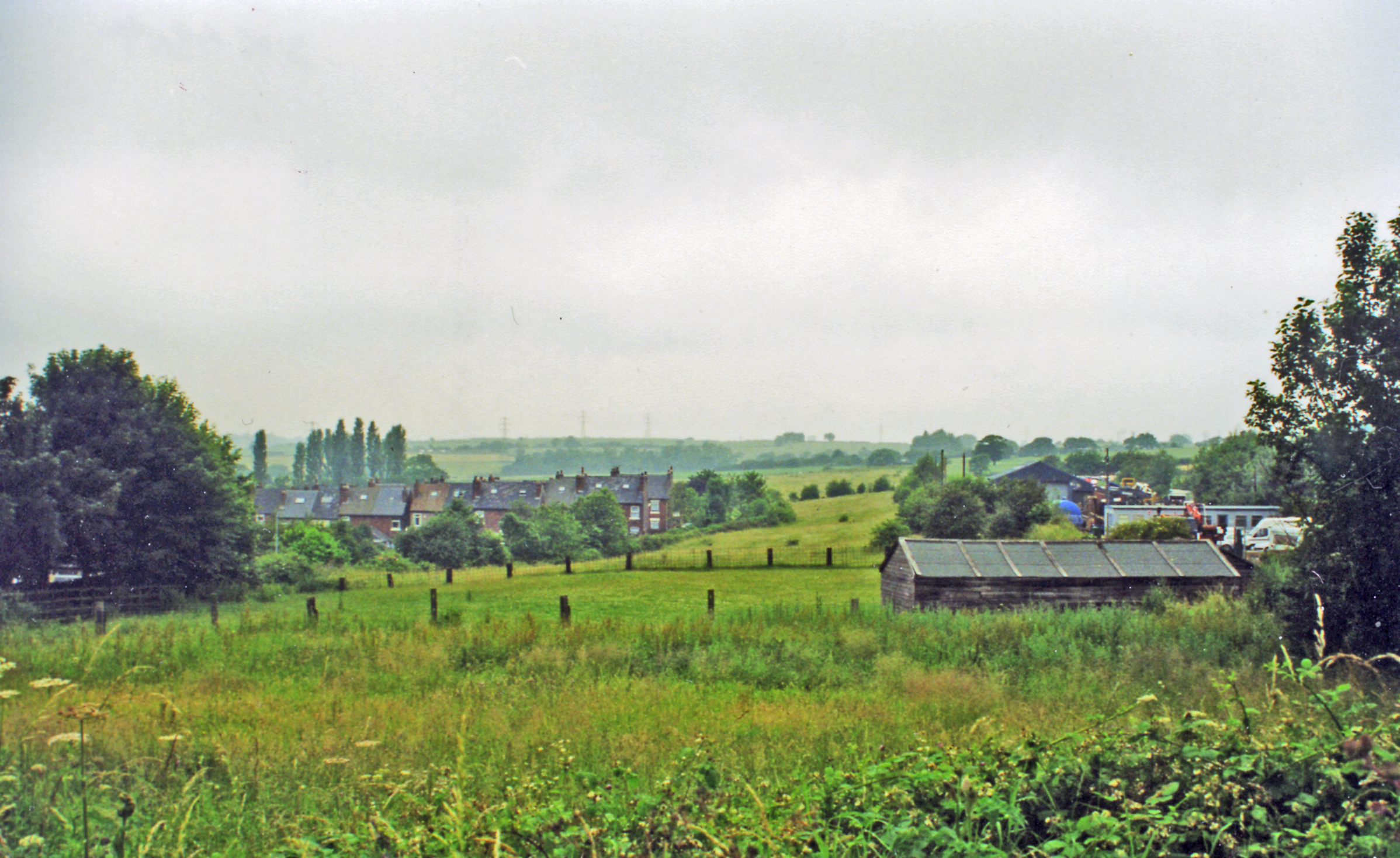
- Site of the former station, seen in 2000

General information
- Location: Kirkby-in-Ashfield, Ashfield District; England
- Coordinates: 53.095°N 1.272°W
- Platforms: 2

Other information
- Status: Disused

History
- Original company: Manchester, Sheffield and Lincolnshire Railway
- Pre-grouping: Great Central Railway
- Post-grouping: London and North Eastern Railway

Key dates
- 2 January 1893: Opened
- 4 March 1963: Closed
Location

Kirkby Bentinck railway station is a former station on the Manchester, Sheffield and Lincolnshire Railway which served the town of Kirkby-in-Ashfield, Nottinghamshire, England from 1893 to 1963.

== History ==
Kirkby Bentinck railway station was on the Annesley branch of the Manchester, Sheffield and Lincolnshire Railway, later the Great Central Railway on the section between Nottingham Victoria and Sheffield Victoria. The station was opened in January 1893 and closed in March 1963 after 70 years in service. Until 1 August 1925 it was named Kirkby & Pinxton station, and it appeared on Ordnance Survey maps as Kirkby & Bentinck station.

Nothing remains of Kirkby Bentinck station apart from two concrete poles that held the station sign and the station master's house on Church Hill.

== Former services ==
Preceding station	Disused railways	Following station
Tibshelf Town; Line and station closed	Great Central Railway; Derbyshire Lines; London Extension	Hollin Well and Annesley; Line and station closed
