= Southwell railway station =

Former railway station in Nottinghamshire, England

Coordinates: 53.081883°N 0.94613°W

Southwell
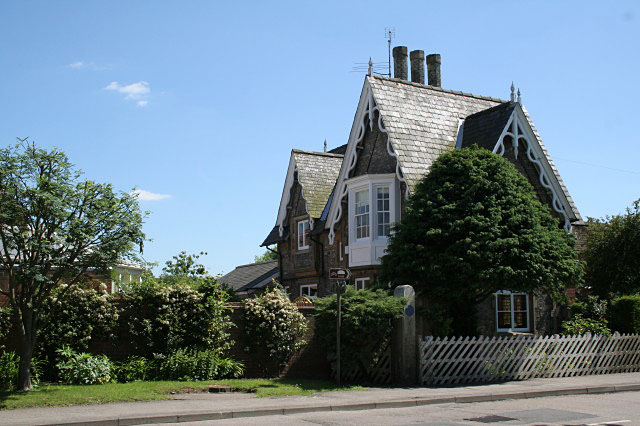
- Southwell railway station building in 2008

General information
- Location: Southwell, Newark and Sherwood, Nottinghamshire; England
- Grid reference: SK705544
- Platforms: 2

Other information
- Status: Disused

History
- Pre-grouping: Midland Railway
- Post-grouping: London, Midland and Scottish Railway

Key dates
- 1 July 1847: Opened
- 1871: Rebuilt in stone
- 15 June 1959: Closed to passengers
- 7 December 1964: Closed for freight
Location

Southwell railway station served the town of Southwell in Nottinghamshire, England, from 1847 to 1959. It was a stop on the Rolleston Junction-Mansfield line.

== History ==
The station at Southwell opened on 1 July 1847 as a branch line from the Nottingham and Lincoln Railway at Rolleston Junction. In its early years, the passenger service was horse-worked. In 1862 gas lighting was introduced.

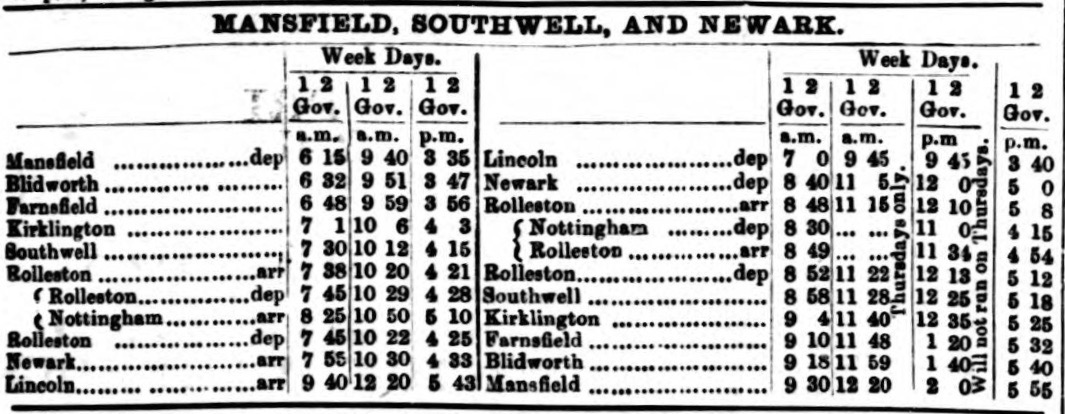
Timetable from Mansfield Reporter, 29 November 1878

In 1871 the line was extended to Mansfield by the contractors Eckersley and Baylis (using cast iron bridges built by Andrew Handyside and Company of Derby). The Midland Railway took the opportunity to rebuild the station building and stationmaster's house in stone and the platform shelters, and dismantle the original wooden station building, which was re-erected at Beeston railway station.

The Mansfield to Southwell section, which passed through a mining area subject to subsidence, was closed to passengers by the London, Midland and Scottish Railway in 1929, the same year in which a north to south-west curve at Rolleston was opened to give direct access to the Fiskerton direction from the branch. The Southwell to Rolleston Junction section remained open to passengers until 1959, normally worked by a push–pull train. Freight services ended in 1964.

=== Stationmasters ===
- J. Bailey, to 1860
- Samuel Whitehouse, 1860–1863
- I. Kilby, 1863–1865
- William Yeomans, from 1865
- Samuel Jacques, c. 1868 – c. 1876, former station master at Derby Nottingham Road
- George Cherry, c. 1877–1878
- George Peck, 1878–1886, former station master at Tewkesbury and Ashchurch
- Walter Scott, 1886–1903
- William Clapham, 1903–1910
- Thomas Maidens, c. 1914–1917, then stationmaster at Coalville
- Frank Porter, c. 1918–1928
- Walter Scott, 1936–1939, former station master at Appleby
- Arthur G. Sperry from 1939, former station master at South Witham

== Present day ==
The station building is now in use both as a private residence and a bed & breakfast called Southwell Station House. The old level crossing gate is still visible by the station building.

A pub called The Final Whistle lies nearby; it contains railway memorabilia and relics.

The westbound trackbed back towards Mansfield forms a shared-use path called the Southwell Trail. The trackbed immediately to the east is now occupied by housing developments; beyond this, the route of the old railway to Rolleston has become Racecourse Road.

Rolleston Junction station remains open, now renamed Rolleston, as a stop on the Nottingham-Lincoln line; it is close to Southwell Racecourse, about three miles (4.8 km) south-east of the town itself. Fiskerton station is also an equal distance from Southwell, one stop further along the line to the south-west of Rolleston.

Preceding station	Disused railways	Following station
Rolleston Junction; Line closed, station open	Midland Railway; Rolleston Junction to Mansfield	Kirklington; Line and station closed
Fiskerton; Line closed, station open	Midland Railway; Fiskerton to Mansfield	Kirklington; Line and station closed
