= Basford =

Basford may refer to:

== People ==
- Basford (surname)

== Places ==
=== United Kingdom ===
- Basford, Cheshire
- Basford, Nottingham
  - Basford Rural District, a rural district close to Nottingham, England, from 1894 to 1974
  - Old Basford, an area of Nottingham
  - Basford North railway station, a railway station to serve Basford and Bulwell in Nottinghamshire
  - New Basford railway station, a station in Nottingham on the Great Central Railway main line
  - St. Leodegarius Church, Basford, a parish church in the Church of England
  - St. Aidan's Church, Basford, a parish church in the Church of England in Basford, Nottingham
  - Basford and Bulwell railway station, a station in Nottingham
- Basford, Shropshire
- Basford, Staffordshire
  - Hartshill and Basford Halt railway station, a railway station located between Stoke-on-Trent and Newcastle-under-Lyme

=== United States ===
- Basford, Nebraska, a ghost town in the United States
