= Highbury Vale =

Coordinates: 52.995°N 1.191°W

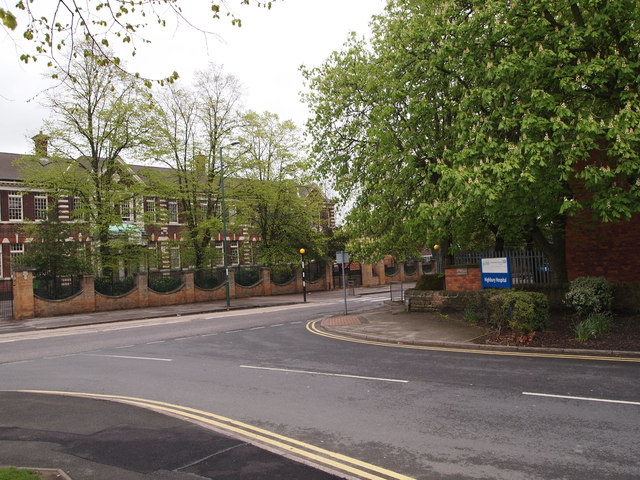
- Highbury Road

- Location within Nottinghamshire
- Population: 4,530
- OS grid reference: SK5429244526
- District: Nottingham
- Shire county: Nottinghamshire
- Region: East Midlands
- Country: England
- Sovereign state: United Kingdom
- Post town: NOTTINGHAM
- Postcode district: NG6
- Dialling code: 0115
- Police: Nottinghamshire
- Fire: Nottinghamshire
- Ambulance: East Midlands
- UK Parliament: Nottingham North and Kimberley

Highbury Vale is an area located in the city of Nottingham, and is located in the Bulwell Forest ward (which includes Rise Park and the western area of Top Valley). The area forms part of a conservation area and is located roughly 5.4 miles (8.7 km) from the City Centre, and about 1 mile (2 km) from Bulwell. Surrounding areas include Bulwell towards the North, Bestwood to the east, Hempshill Vale to the west and Cinderhill and Basford towards the south. At the 2001 census, the area had a population of 4,530.

== Facilities ==
Most facilities in Highbury Vale are located on Highbury Road. Facilities include an array of amenities, such as a bakery, florists, launderette, takeaways, as well as a pharmacy, a British Red Cross charity shop and convenience stores.

Highbury Vale also has a sports centre located off Kemmel Road as well as a health centre known as Highbury Hospital. Schools in the area include the Heathfield Primary and Nursery School of Kersall Drive, Our Lady of Perpetual Succour Catholic Primary School next to Piccadilly as well as the Cantrell Primary and Nursery School.

== Demography ==
According to the data of the 2001 Census, the area has a population of 4,530, and a majority of the population are aged 25–44, who make up 32.8% of the population.

The census also shows that 87.0% of the population is White British, as well as 1.5% being White Irish and 1.1% being classed as Other White. 3.8% of the population is Mixed Race, 1.8% is Asian or Asian British, 4.5% is Black or Black British as well as 0.2% of the population being Chinese and other ethnic groups also making 0.2% of the population.

== Religion ==
The 2001 Census shows that 61.3% are Christian and 27.5% have no religion. 1.1% of the population are Muslim, Hinduism and Sikhism each score 0.4%, 0.1% of the population are Buddhist and other religions make up 0.3% of the population as well as another 9.0% who did not state their religion.

== Transport ==
=== Tram ===
Highbury Vale has two different main platforms for Line 1 and Line 2, as they both separate after stopping at the preceding station (David Lane). Next to the Hucknall Line platform is the railway line for trains that travel from Nottingham to Worksop. The nearest railway station to Highbury Vale is located in Bulwell.

Preceding station	NET	Following station
Bulwell towards Hucknall	Line 1	David Lane towards Toton Lane
Cinderhill towards Phoenix Park	Line 2	David Lane towards Clifton South

Nottingham Express Transit

■ 1: Toton Lane → Beeston → QMC → NG2 Business Park → Railway Station → Nottingham → The Forest → Wilkinson Street → Highbury Vale → Bulwell → Hucknall

■ 2: Clifton South → Clifton → Wilford Lane → Railway Station → Nottingham → The Forest → Wilkinson Street → Highbury Vale → Phoenix Park

=== Bus services ===
Highbury Vale has a number of frequent bus service ran by Nottingham City Transport as well as a Locallink service ran by Nottingham Community Transport.

Nottingham City Transport

■ 17: Nottingham → NCN Clarendon College → Hucknall Road → City Hospital → Highbury Vale (St Alban's Road) → Bulwell

■ 68: Nottingham → Sherwood Rise → Basford → Highbury Vale → Bulwell → Hempshill Vale → Snape Wood

■ 68A: Nottingham → Sherwood Rise → Basford → Highbury Vale → Bulwell → Hempshill Vale → Blenheim Ind Est → Snape Wood

■ 69: Nottingham → Sherwood Rise → Basford → Highbury Vale → Bulwell → Snape Wood → Hempshill Vale

■ 69A: Nottingham → Sherwood Rise → Basford → Highbury Vale → Bulwell → Blenheim Ind Est → Snape Wood

Nottingham Community Transport

■ L14: Nottingham → Hyson Green → Nottingham Road → City Hospital → Highbury Vale (Brooklyn Road) → Bulwell
