= Highbury Vale tram stop =

Nottingham Express Transit tram stop

Highbury Vale
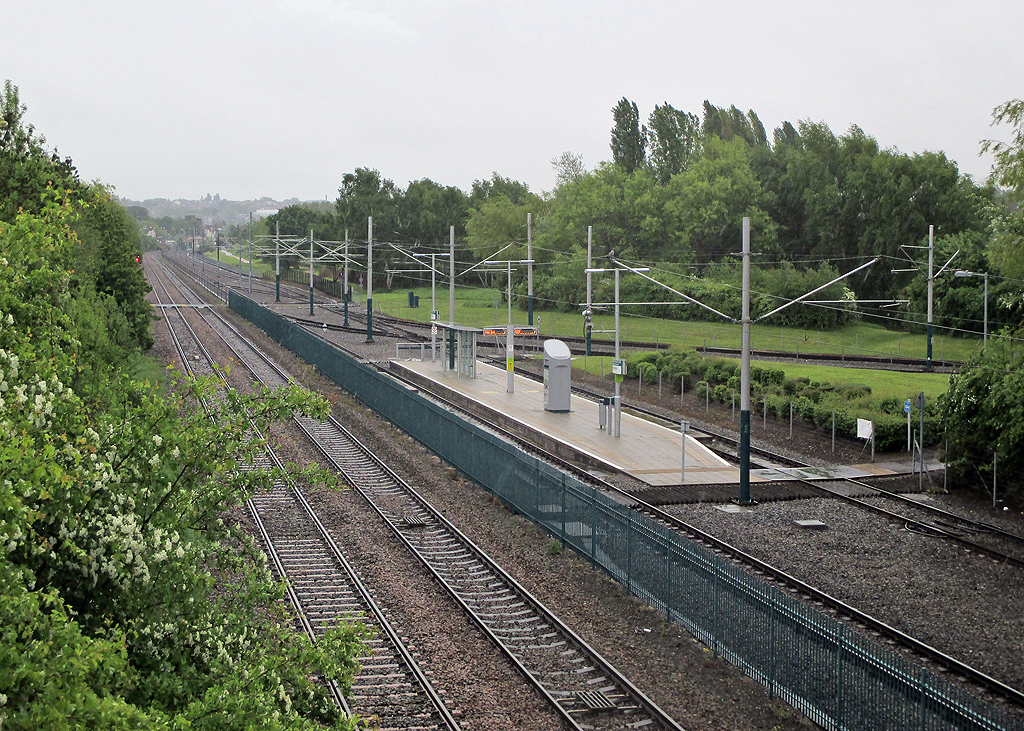

General information
- Location: Highbury Vale, City of Nottingham; England
- Coordinates: 52°59′23″N 1°11′24″W
- System: Nottingham Express Transit tram stop
- Owner: Nottingham Express Transit
- Operator: Nottingham Express Transit
- Line: 1 2
- Platforms: 4
- Tracks: 4

Construction
- Structure type: At grade; on private right of way
- Accessible: Step-free access to platform

Key dates
- 9 March 2004: Opened

Services
| Preceding station | NET | Following station |
|---|---|---|
| Bulwell towards Hucknall | Line 1 | David Lane towards Toton Lane |
| Cinderhill towards Phoenix Park | Line 2 | David Lane towards Clifton South |
Location
- Location within Nottinghamshire

Highbury Vale is a stop on the Nottingham Express Transit tram system in the city of Nottingham near the boundary between the suburb of Basford and town of Bulwell. It serves as the main interchange between the Hucknall and Phoenix Park branches of the initial system - however, NET recommends that people alight at the previous stop rather than change at Highbury Vale, due to the lines splitting at Babbington junction, just before the trams reach the stop.

The two separate parts of the tram stop each comprise an island platform flanked by twin tracks. The platform for the Hucknall branch is alongside and parallel to the Robin Hood railway line that links Nottingham and Worksop. The tram and railway tracks are separated by a fence, and there is no stop on the railway line. The platform on the Phoenix Park branch is some 50 m (160 ft) away, and at an angle to the Hucknall platform. Between the two platforms is a small open space, and on the connecting footpath is a display indicating which platform to go to for the next city tram. Immediately to the west of the platform on the Phoenix Park, the twin tracks merge into the single track branch. The single line track follows the trackbed of a short railway branch line to a local colliery.

With the opening of NET's phase two, Highbury Vale is now the more northerly of the two junctions on the NET, where line 1, from Hucknall, meets line 2, from Phoenix Park. South of Highbury Vale the two lines run together through the city centre to a junction just south of Nottingham railway station. Here the two lines split again, with line 1 continuing to Beeston and Chilwell, and line 2 to Wilford and Clifton. Trams on each line run at frequencies that vary between 4 and 8 trams per hour, depending on the day and time of day, combining to provide up to 16 trams per hour on the common section.

== Gallery ==
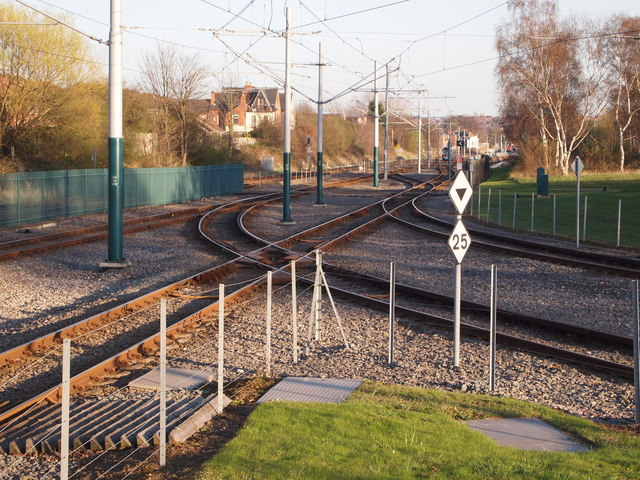
Babbington junction, where the two lines split

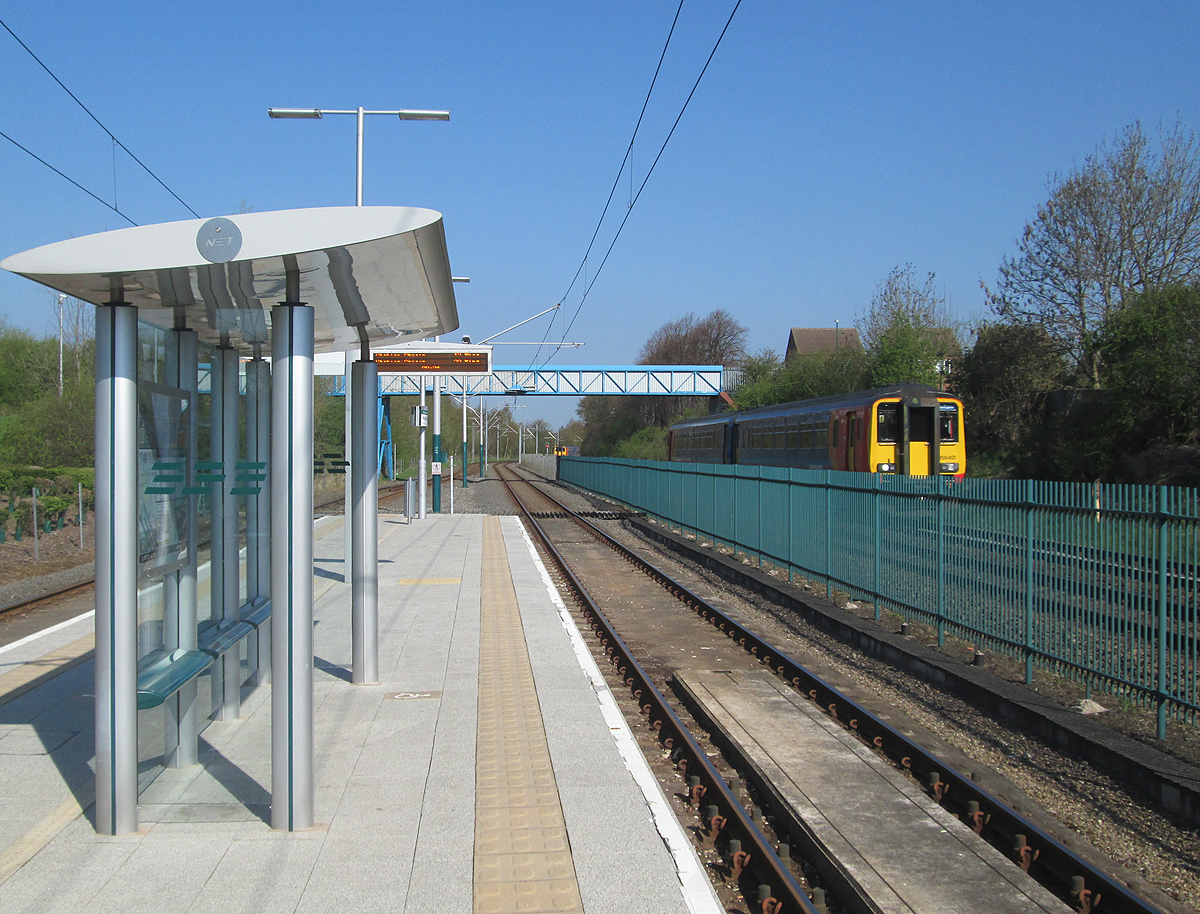
Platform on Hucknall branch with train passing

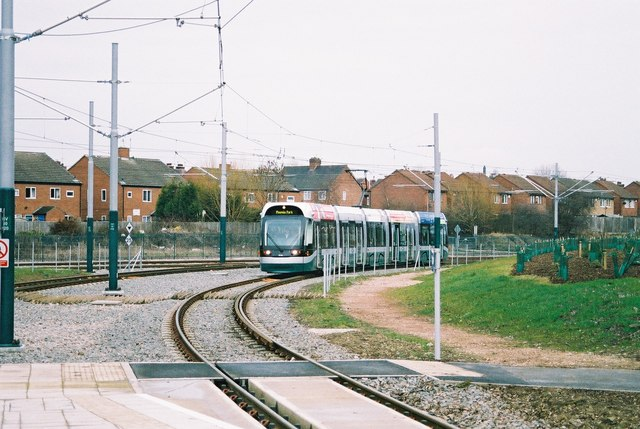
Tram to Phoenix Park nearing platform from junction

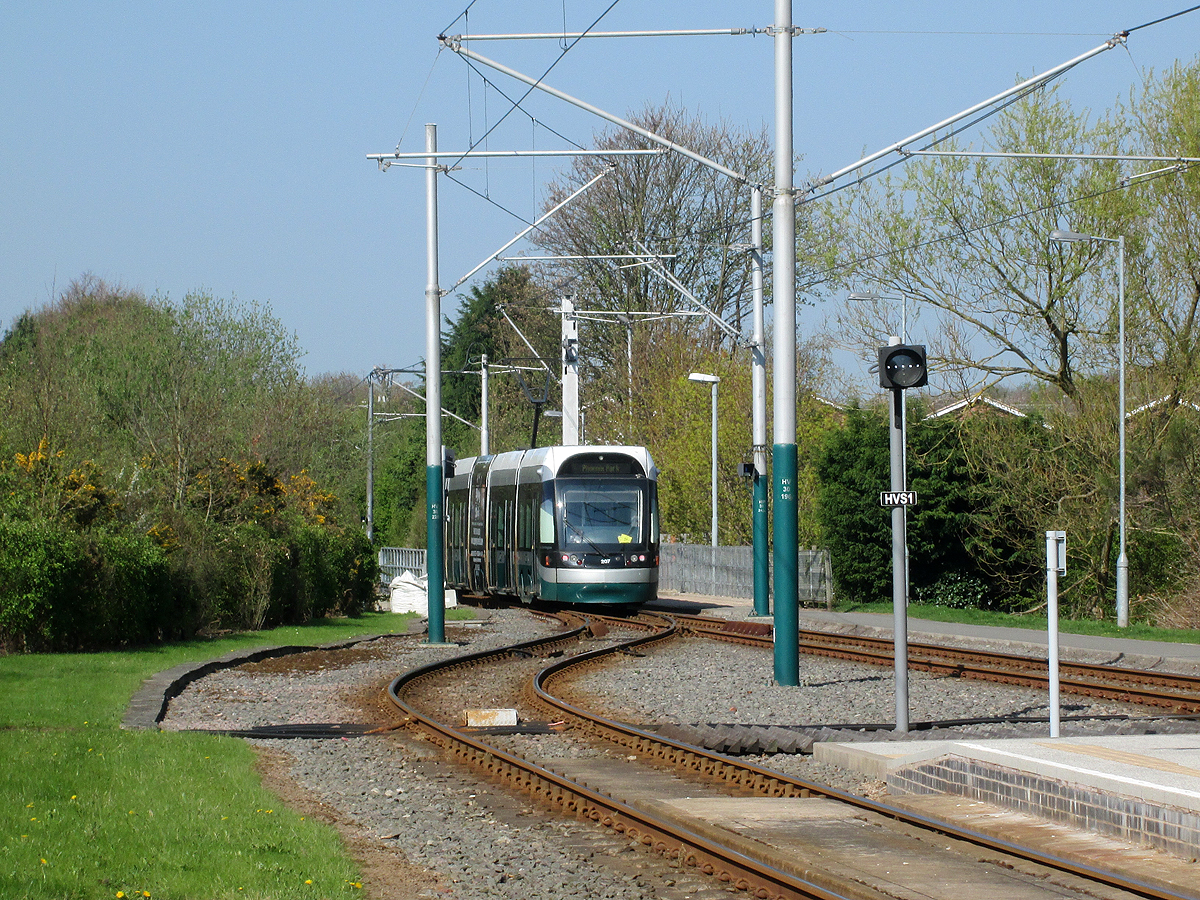
Tram to Phoenix Park entering single track
