= Kimberley railway station =

Kimberley railway station may refer to:

- Kimberley railway station (South Africa) in Kimberley, Northern Cape, South Africa

or to any of the three railway stations in the Kimberley, Nottinghamshire area, these are:

- Kimberley West railway station, on the Midland Railways Basford to Bennerley Junction branch
- Kimberley East railway station, on the GNR Derbyshire and Staffordshire Extension
- Watnall railway station, on the Midland Railways Bennerley and Bulwell branch

== See also ==
- Kimberley Park railway station, Norfolk
