= Hasford =

Hasford is a surname. Notable people with the surname include:

- Gustav Hasford (1947–1993), American journalist, writer, and poet
- Jason Hasford (born 1971), English footballer
- Joerg Hasford (born 1950), German physician, biometrician, and epidemiologist

== See also ==
- Basford (surname)
