= Basford tram stop =

Nottingham Express Transit tram stop

Basford
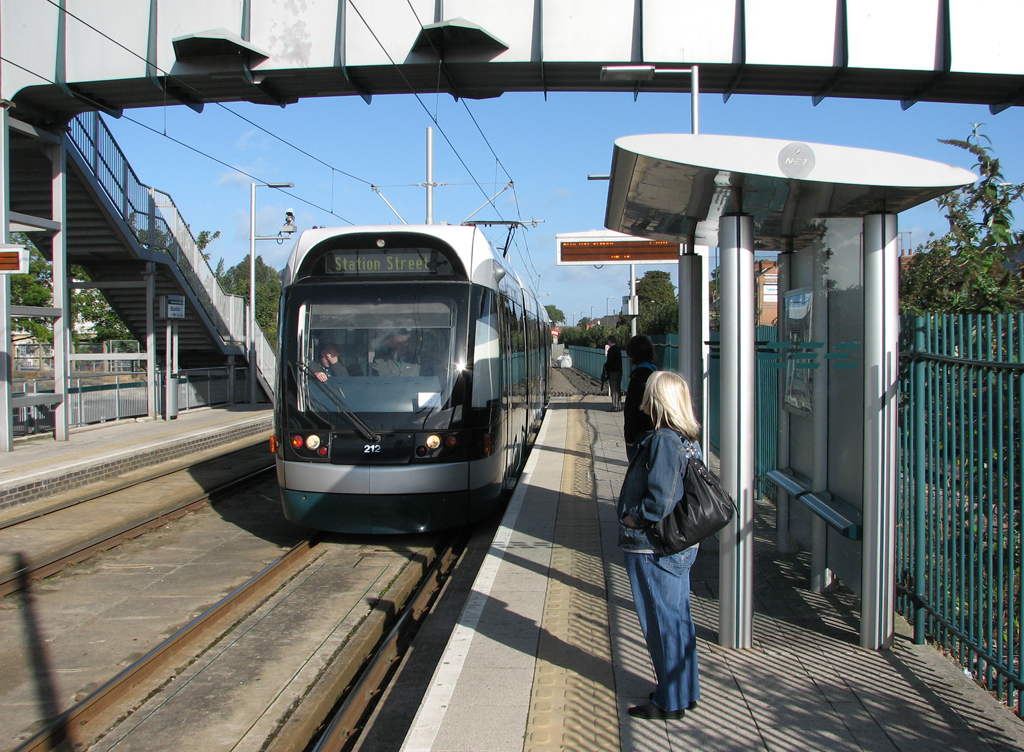

General information
- Location: Basford, City of Nottingham, England
- Coordinates: 52°59′06″N 1°10′56″W
- System: Nottingham Express Transit
- Owner: Nottingham Express Transit
- Operator: Nottingham Express Transit
- Line: 1 2
- Platforms: 2
- Tracks: 2

Construction
- Structure type: At grade; on private right of way
- Accessible: Step-free access to platform

Key dates
- 9 March 2004: Opened

Services
Preceding station	NET	Following station
David Lane towards Hucknall	Line 1	Wilkinson Street towards Toton Lane
David Lane towards Phoenix Park	Line 2	Wilkinson Street towards Clifton South
Location
- Location within Nottinghamshire

Basford is a tram stop on the Nottingham Express Transit (NET) system, in the City of Nottingham suburb of Basford, in Nottinghamshire, England.

== History ==
The tram stop is located on the site of the sidings and goods shed of the former Basford Vernon railway station, which opened in 1848 and closed in 1964. The tram stop opened on 9 March 2004, along with the rest of NET's initial system.

== Description ==
The tram lines here run parallel to the Robin Hood railway line that links Nottingham with Mansfield and Worksop, but there is no corresponding railway station. Both tram and railway lines have two tracks and the resulting four tracks are crossed by a pedestrian bridge. The tram stop comprises a pair of side platforms on both sides of the tramway.

== Service ==
With the opening of phase two, Basford is now on the common section of the NET, where line 1, between Hucknall and Toton, and line 2, between Phoenix Park and Clifton, operate together.

Trams on each line run at frequencies that vary between four and eight trams per hour, depending on the day and time of day, combining to provide up to 16 trams per hour on the common section.

== Gallery ==
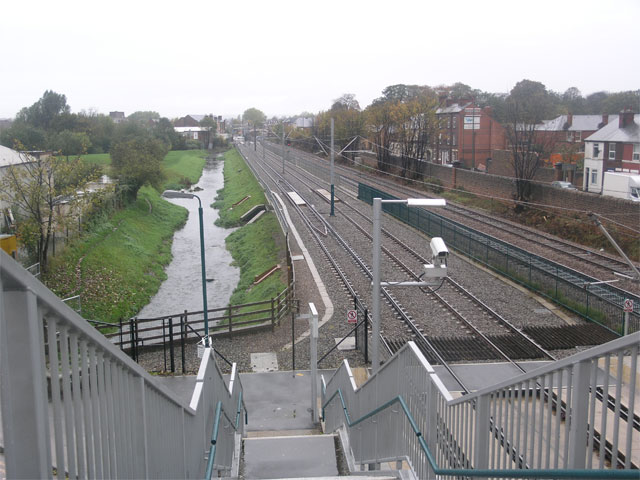
Tram stop, railway lines and River Leen seen from bridge looking north

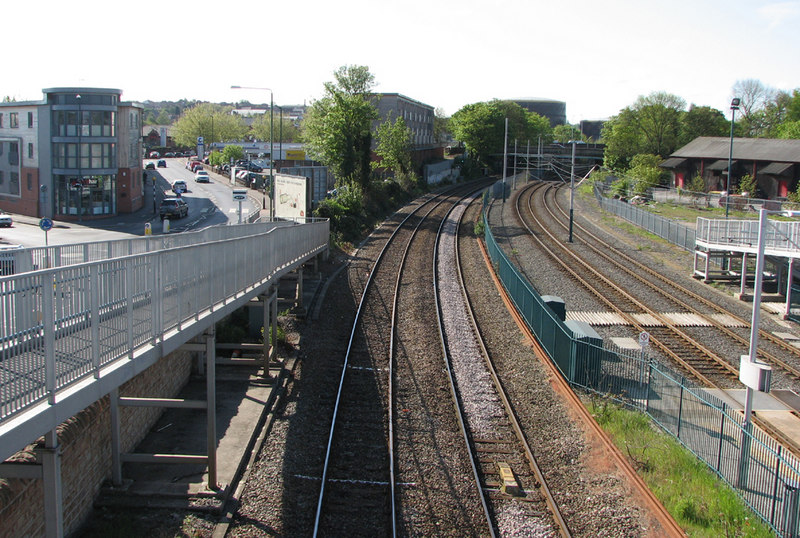
Railway and tram stop from bridge looking south

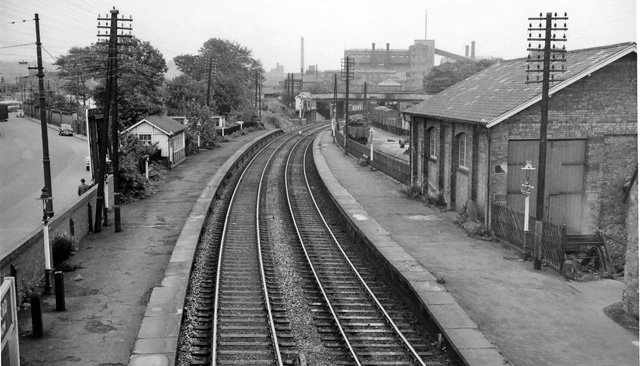
Basford Vernon railway station looking south in 1963, from a similar viewpoint to the previous image

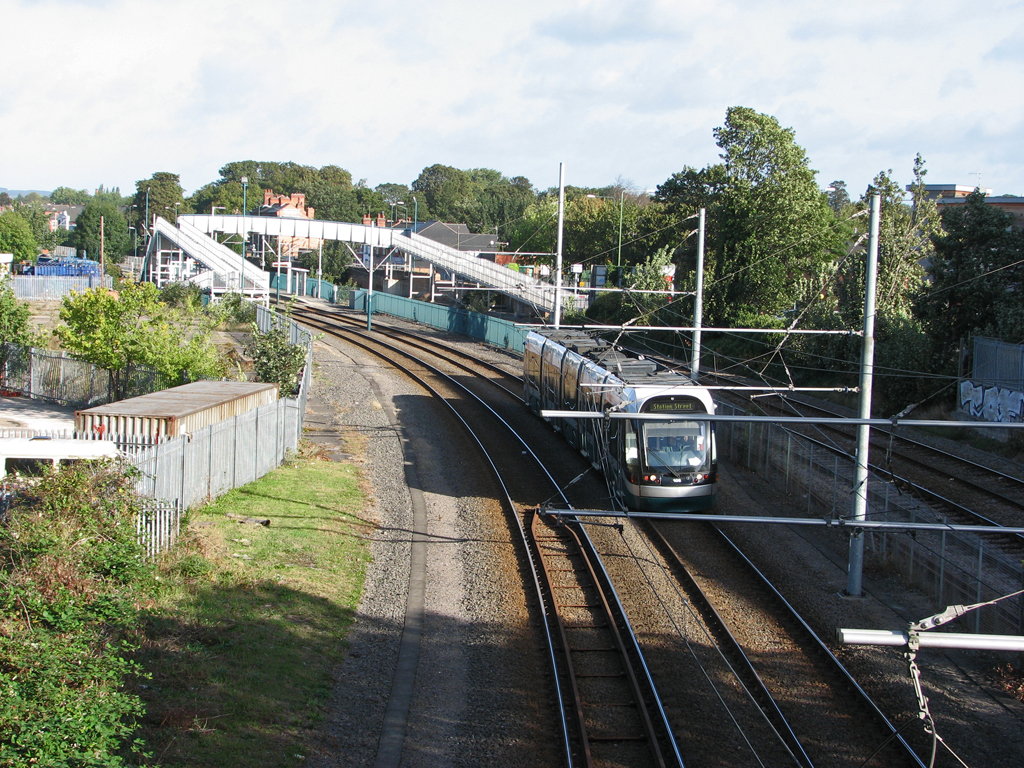
Southbound tram leaving Basford
