= David Lane tram stop =

Nottingham Express Transit tram stop

David Lane
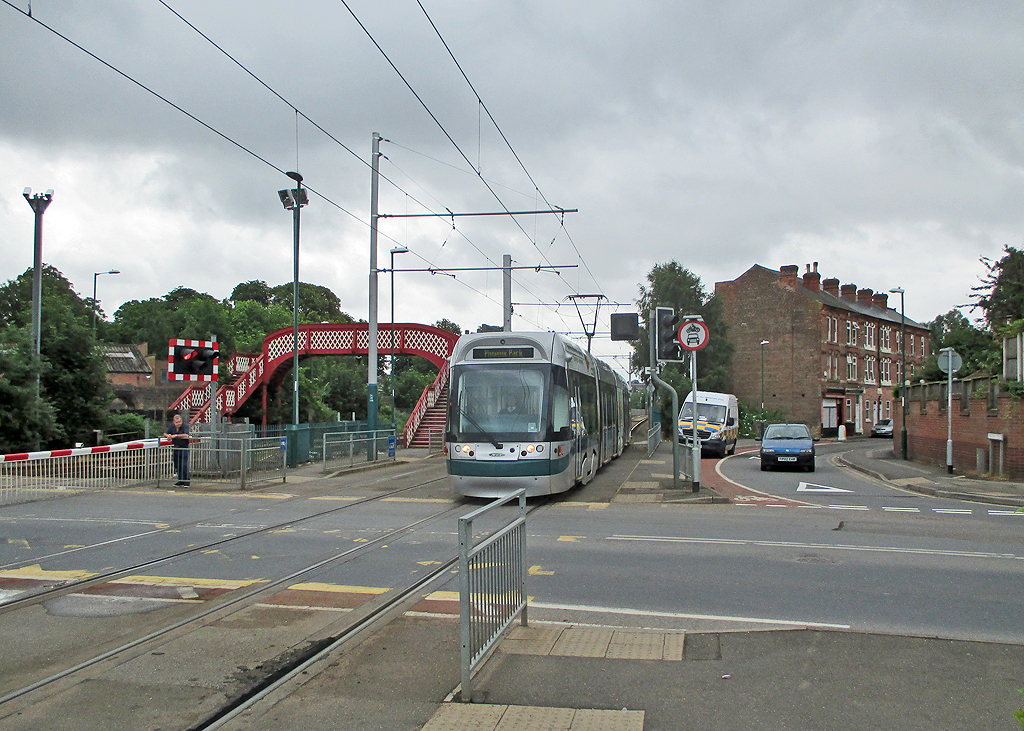

General information
- Location: Basford, City of Nottingham; England
- Coordinates: 52°59′23″N 1°11′24″W
- System: Nottingham Express Transit tram stop
- Owner: Nottingham Express Transit
- Operator: Nottingham Express Transit
- Line: 1 2
- Platforms: 2
- Tracks: 2

Construction
- Structure type: At grade; on private right of way
- Accessible: Step-free access to platform

Key dates
- 9 March 2004: Opened

Services
Preceding station	NET	Following station
Highbury Vale towards Hucknall	Line 1	Basford towards Toton Lane
Highbury Vale towards Phoenix Park	Line 2	Basford towards Clifton South
Location
- Location within Nottinghamshire

David Lane is a tram station on Nottingham Express Transit, in the city of Nottingham suburb of Basford. The tram lines here run parallel to the Robin Hood railway line that links Nottingham with Worksop, but there is no corresponding railway station. Both tram and railway lines have two tracks, and the resulting four tracks cross David Lane on a pair of parallel level crossings. The tram stop comprises a pair of side platforms on both sides of the tramway.

With the opening of NET's phase two, David Lane is now on the common section of the NET, where line 1, between Hucknall and Chilwell, and line 2, between Phoenix Park and Clifton, operate together. Trams on each line run at frequencies that vary between 4 and 8 trams per hour, depending on the day and time of day, combining to provide up to 16 trams per hour on the common section.

Nottingham Express Transit recommend using this stop to change between the Hucknall and Phoenix Park branches, rather than the next station (Highbury Vale) where the two branches diverge.

This is the closest tram stop to Basford United's football stadium, Greenwich Avenue.

== Gallery ==
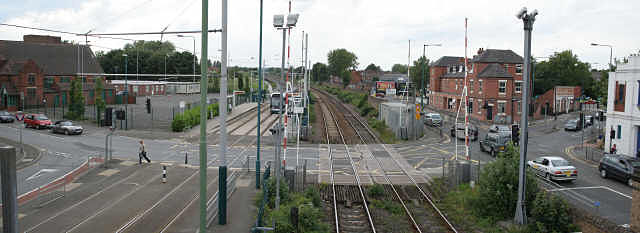
The level crossings seen from above; a tram is in the tram stop.

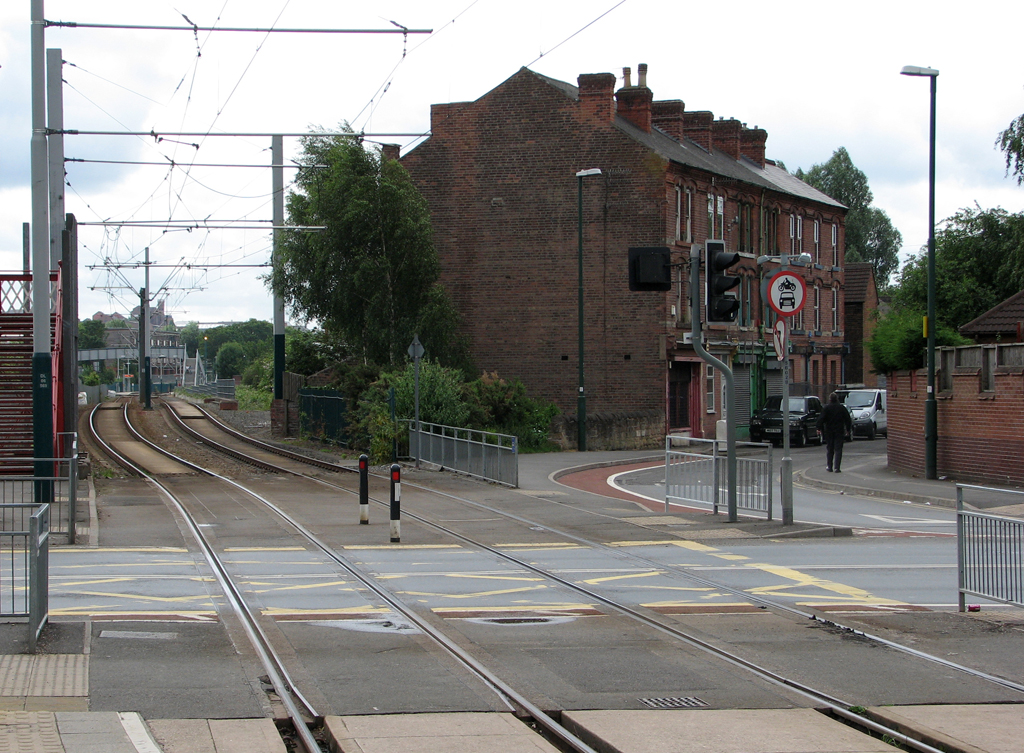
View from tram stop towards Basford

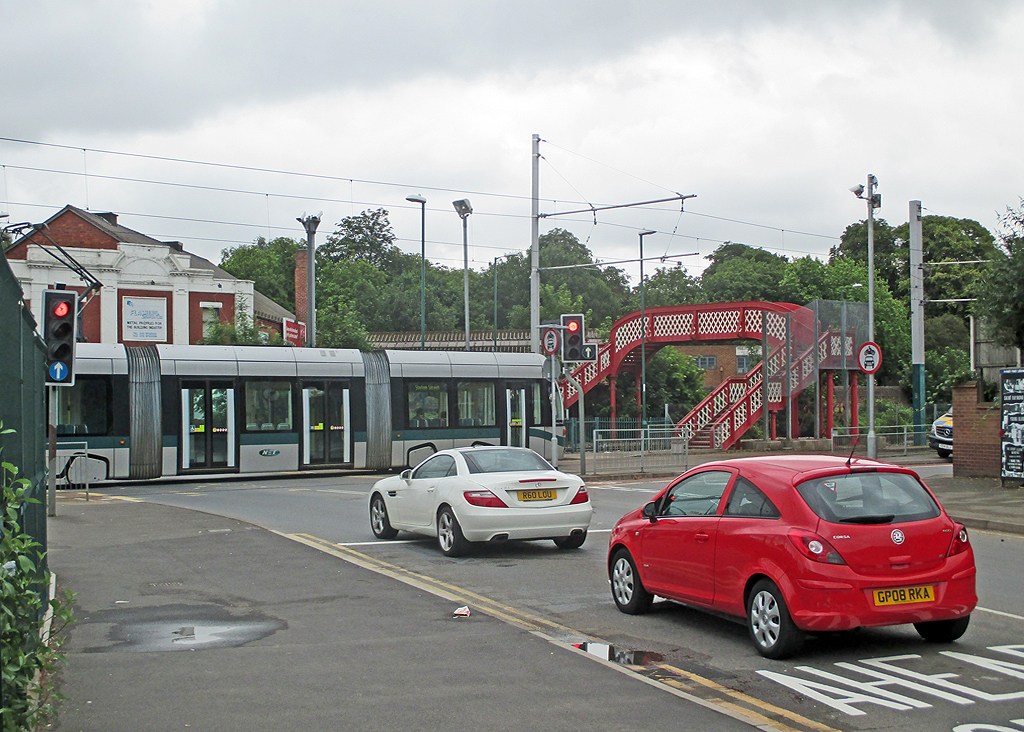
Traffic waiting for a tram to cross
