= Basford (surname) =

Basford is a surname. Notable people with the surname include:

- Bill Basford (1930–2022), American politician and lawyer
- Harry Elsworth Basford (1808–1974), American farmer and politician
- Jack Basford (1925–1998), English footballer
- Johanna Basford (b. 1983), Scottish illustrator
- Kathleen Basford (1916–1998), British botanist
- Kaye Basford (b. 1952), Australian statistician and plant geneticist
- Matthew Basford, guitarist for the band Yankee Grey
- Ron Basford (1932–2005), Canadian politician

== See also ==
- Bassford
