= Basford Vernon railway station =

Former railway station in Nottinghamshire, England

Basford Vernon
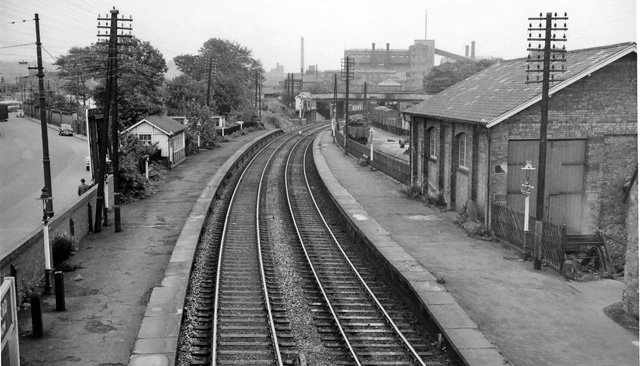
- Basford Vernon railway station in 1963

General information
- Location: Basford, City of Nottingham; England
- Coordinates: 52°58.8360′N 1°10.6691′W
- Platforms: 2

Other information
- Status: Disused

History
- Original company: Midland Railway
- Pre-grouping: Midland Railway
- Post-grouping: London, Midland and Scottish Railway

Key dates
- 2 October 1848: Opened as Basford
- 11 August 1952: Renamed Basford Vernon
- 4 January 1960: Station closed
Location

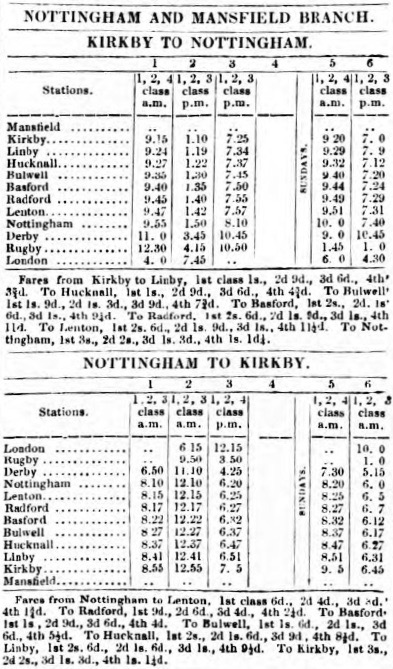
Midland Railway timetable from 1848 showing services between Nottingham and Kirkby

Basford Vernon railway station is a disused railway station that was located on the Robin Hood Line between Nottingham and Mansfield.

== History ==
The station was originally called Basford on the Midland Railway's Nottingham to Mansfield Line and opened on 2 October 1848. Three passenger trains a day in each direction were provided from Monday to Saturday with two on Sundays. The fare from Nottingham to Lenton was 1s. in first class, 9d in second class, and 6d in third class.

It was renamed in August 1952 and closed to passengers on 4 January 1960 and to goods on 2 October 1967.

In its place now stands the Nottingham Express Transit (NET) Basford tram stop which opened on 9 March 2004, along with the rest of NET's initial system. The tram stop is located on the site of the sidings and goods shed of the former Basford Vernon railway station.

== Stationmasters ==
- J. Shaw ca. 1860–1867
- John Salt 1867–1904
- C. Snell 1905–1910 (formerly station master at Sutton in Ashfield)
- J. Davies 1910–1922 (formerly stationmaster at Spondon afterwards stationmaster at Bath)
- S.J. Whitehead 1922 – (formerly station master at Butterley, also stationmaster of Radford and Bulwell)

Preceding station	Historical railways	Following station
Radford; Line open, station closed	Midland Railway; Nottingham to Mansfield line	Bulwell; Line open, station closed
	Disused railways	
Watnall; Line and station closed	Midland Railway; Bennerley and Bulwell Railway	Bulwell; Line open, station closed

|}
