= Listed buildings in Nottingham (Basford ward) =

Basford is an electoral ward in the city of Nottingham, England. The ward contains ten listed buildings that are recorded in the National Heritage List for England. Of these, one is listed at Grade II*, the middle of the three grades, and the others are at Grade II, the lowest grade. The ward is to the northwest of the centre of Nottingham, and is mainly residential. The listed buildings consist of a church, two tombs in the churchyard and the churchyard walls, two houses, later used for other purposes, and associated structures, a public house, a former brewery, and a former malt house.

== Key ==
Grade	Criteria
II*	Particularly important buildings of more than special interest
II	Buildings of national importance and special interest

== Buildings ==
Name and location	Photograph	Date	Notes	Grade
St Leodegarius Church and grave enclosure 52.97952°N 1.17787°W		c. 1180	The church has been altered and extended through the centuries, including alterations and a Victorian restoration in 1858–60, during which the tower fell and was rebuilt. The church is built in stone with slate roofs, and consists of a nave with a clerestory, north and south aisles, north and south porches, a chancel with a chapel and a vestry, and a west tower. The tower has three stages, angle buttresses, string courses, a corbel table, and a pierced balustrade with octagonal pinnacles. The south porch has a pointed arched entrance with a chamfered surround and a hood mould, and an inner doorway with a moulded surround. Attached to its east side is a stone table tomb with wrought iron spearhead railing.	II*
Chest tomb southwest of the porch, St Leodegarius Church; 52.97935°N 1.17798°W	—	Late 17th century	The chest tomb is in stone with a chamfered top and an illegible inscription. It has an incised wave pattern at the corners, crossed darts on the side panels, and a dove and a skull on the end panels.	II
Old Basford Health Centre; 52.97923°N 1.17936°W		Early 18th century	A house, later used for other purposes, in brick, roughcast on the front, on a rendered plinth, with a tile roof. There are two storeys and attics, and five bays. The central doorway has a fanlight with Gothic glazing and a hood on foliage brackets. To its right is a shallow bay window, and the other windows are sashes. To the left is a two-storey two-bay wing with quoins, a shallow bay window, and a pedimented gable.	II
Basford House; 52.98022°N 1.17900°W		c. 1739	The house, later divided and used for other purposes, is in red brick, partly rendered, on a stone plinth, with stone and brick dressings, a floor band, a coped parapet, and slate roofs with coped gables. There are three storeys, a double depth plan, and fronts of seven and three bays, the end bays on the main front projecting slightly. In the centre, steps with a curved wrought iron balustrade lead to a doorway with a plain surround and a fanlight. Most of the windows are sashes with flat brick arches. The windows in the upper floor of the right return have keystones.	II
Gate, piers, railings and wall, Basford House; 52.98005°N 1.17917°W		c. 1739	Running along the front of the forecourt is a dwarf rendered wall with stone coping and a wrought iron spearhead railing. In the centre is a pair of panelled stone piers with stepped pyramidal caps, wrought iron double gates and an overthrow, and to the left is a rendered pier with a cornice cap and double wrought iron gates.	II
Chest tomb adjoining the porch, St Leodegarius Church; 52.97938°N 1.17799°W	—	c. 1776	The chest tomb is to the memory of members of the Ward family. It is in stone, and has baluster corners, and moulded edges to the top.	II
Old Pear Tree public house and wall 52.98666°N 1.18145°W		c. 1800	A farmhouse, later a public house, in painted brick with pantile roofs. There are three storeys and four bays. On the front is a lean-to porch, and the windows are cross-casements with segmental heads. Attached to the front is a garden wall in Bulwell stone with ramped rounded coping and a wooden gateway, extending for about 20 metres (66 ft).	II
Churchyard wall and gateways, St Leodegarius Church; 52.97963°N 1.17808°W		c. 1858	The wall is in stone with gabled coping, and extends along the north and west sides of the churchyard. At the corner is a pair of square stone gate piers with pyramidal caps and wrought iron double gates. On the north sides is a similar smaller gateway with single gate.	II
J J Murphy and Sons Limited; 52.98128°N 1.18233°W		1891	A brewery designed by William Bradford and later used for other purposes. It is in red brick on a blue brick chamfered plinth, with dressings in stone and terracotta, a main cornice, an eaves cornice, and tile roofs with ornate ridge tiles and finials. The main front has ten bays with a central tower of five storeys. This contains a two-storey round-arched cart entrance with a moulded arch, imposts and a keystone, above which is a dentilled cornice on brackets. At the top is an ornate gable, and on the roof is a square louvred lantern with a lead ogee roof. To the left are four bays and five storeys, containing casement windows, some with segmental heads and some with keystones. To the right is a two-storey engine house and a tall octagonal chimney. At the rear is a four-storey range with an ornate wooden hoist tower.	II
Former maltings 52.98078°N 1.18208°W		1899	The former malt house, which has been converted for residential use, is in red brick with stone dressings. The front facing the street has five bays, and a coped gable with kneelers. It contains segmental-headed casement windows and oval windows above, all with keystones, in recessed panels. In the gable is a dated shield. The other front has three storeys and attics and seven bays, and contains segmental headed openings in recessed panels, an ornate two-storey hoist housing, and gabled dormers.	II
