= Hollinwell and Annesley railway station =

Former railway station in England

Coordinates: 53.0822°N 1.2267°W

Hollinwell and Annesley (previously Hollin Well and Annesley)
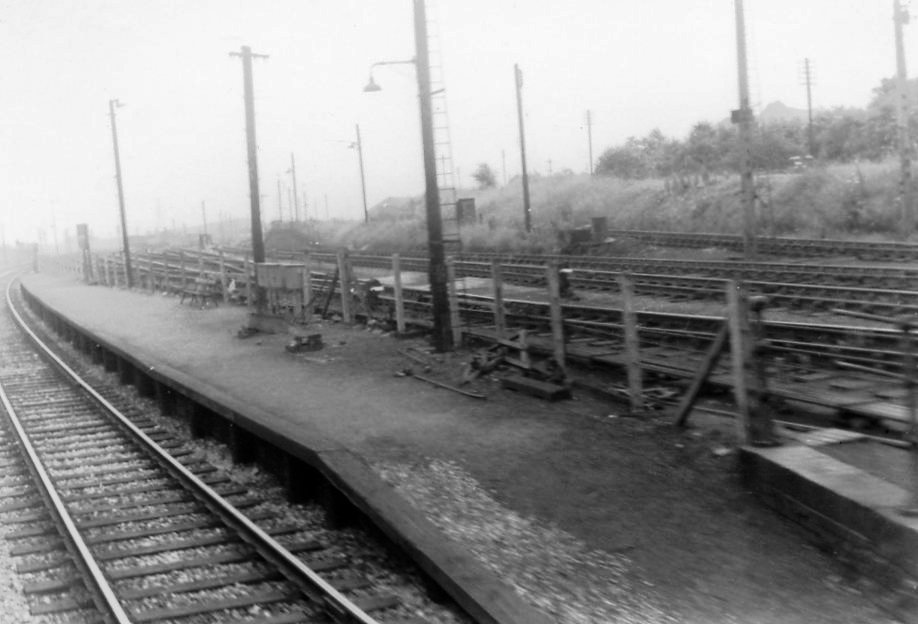

General information
- Location: Annesley, Ashfield District, Nottinghamshire; England
- Platforms: 2

Other information
- Status: Demolished

History
- Opened: 1 November 1901
- Closed: 10 September 1962
- Original company: Great Central Railway
- Pre-grouping: Great Central Railway
- Post-grouping: London and North Eastern Railway

Hollinwell and Annesley (previously Hollin Well and Annesley) is a former station on the Great Central Railway on the section between Nottingham Victoria and Sheffield Victoria. The station was opened in November 1901 and closed in September 1962, one of the earliest closures on the section from Nottingham to Sheffield.

== History ==
The halt initially known as Hollin Well and Annesley opened on the London extension of the Great Central Railway on 1 November 1901, serving Notts Golf Club's new Hollinwell golf course; the club had guaranteed £200 a year in receipts. The station had two wooden platforms and a wooden footbridge on the south edge of the golf course with no road access. Initially, two trains a day were timetabled in Bradshaw's Guide, but the station soon became excluded from timetables, presumably for private use. By 1941, the spelling had changed to Hollinwell. It closed on 10 September 1962.

The station has been demolished and no traces remain.

== Former services ==
| Preceding station | Disused railways | Following station |
|---|---|---|
| Annesley Junction South Halt; Line and station closed | Great Central Railway; London Extension | Kirkby Bentinck; Line and station closed |
