= Cinderhill tram stop =

Nottingham Express Transit tram stop

Cinderhill
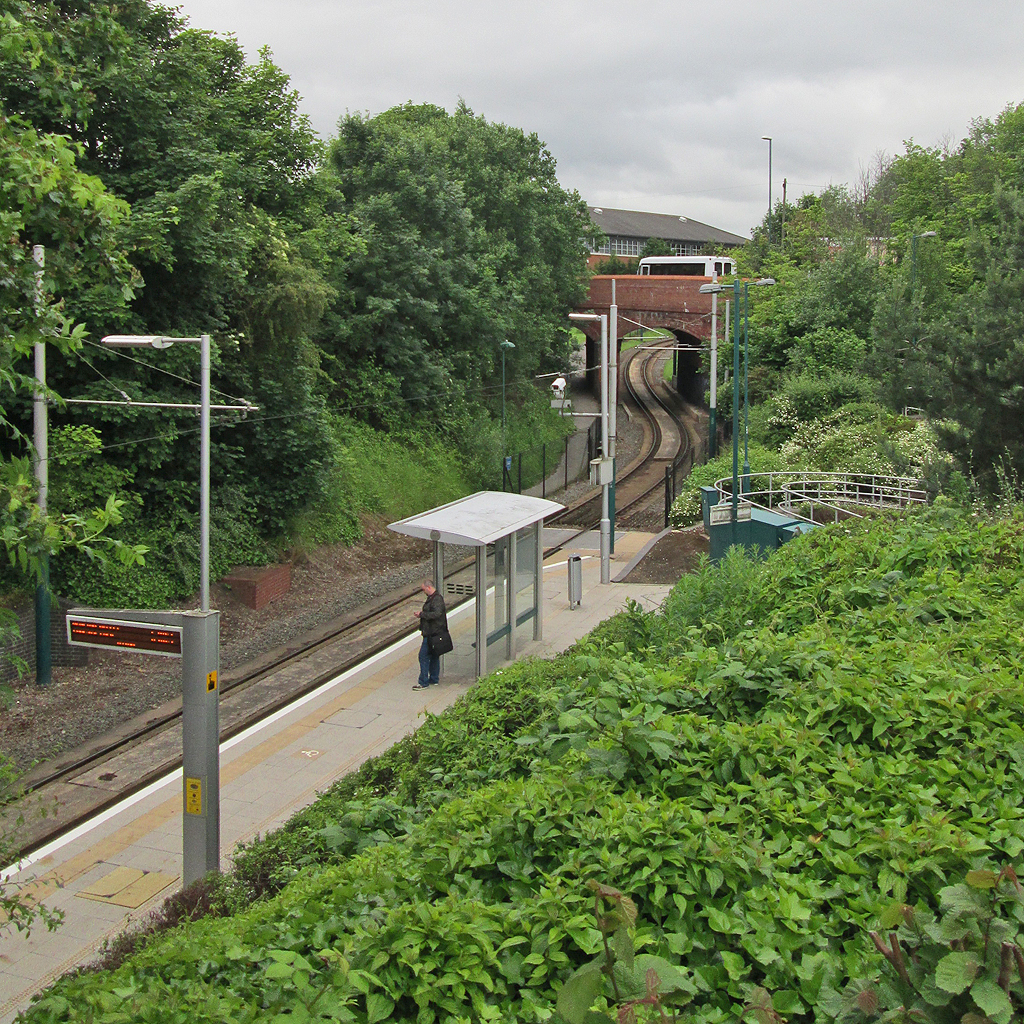

General information
- Location: Cinderhill, City of Nottingham; England
- Coordinates: 52°59′20″N 1°12′03″W
- System: Nottingham Express Transit tram stop
- Owner: Nottingham Express Transit
- Operator: Nottingham Express Transit
- Line: 2
- Platforms: 1
- Tracks: 1

Construction
- Structure type: In cutting; on private right of way
- Accessible: Step-free access to platform

Key dates
- 9 March 2004: Opened

Services
Preceding station	NET	Following station
Phoenix Park Terminus	Line 2	Highbury Vale towards Clifton South
Location
- Location within Nottinghamshire

Cinderhill is a tram stop on the Nottingham Express Transit (NET) light rail system in the city of Nottingham on the boundary between the suburbs of Basford and Bulwell. It was part of the NET's initial system, and is situated in the middle of the short single line branch between Highbury Vale and Phoenix Park tram stops. The stop comprises a single platform and track, situated in a cutting between two bridges and served by trams running in both directions.

With the opening of NET's phase two, Cinderhill is now on NET line 2, which runs from Phoenix Park through the city centre to a terminus in Clifton. Trams run at frequencies that vary between 4 and 8 trams per hour, depending on the day and time of day.

The stop is on the former alignment of the Cinderhill Colliery Railway to the old Babbington Colliery, which is now the site of Phoenix Park.

On 31 August 2021, a car hit a footbridge at the stop.

== Gallery ==
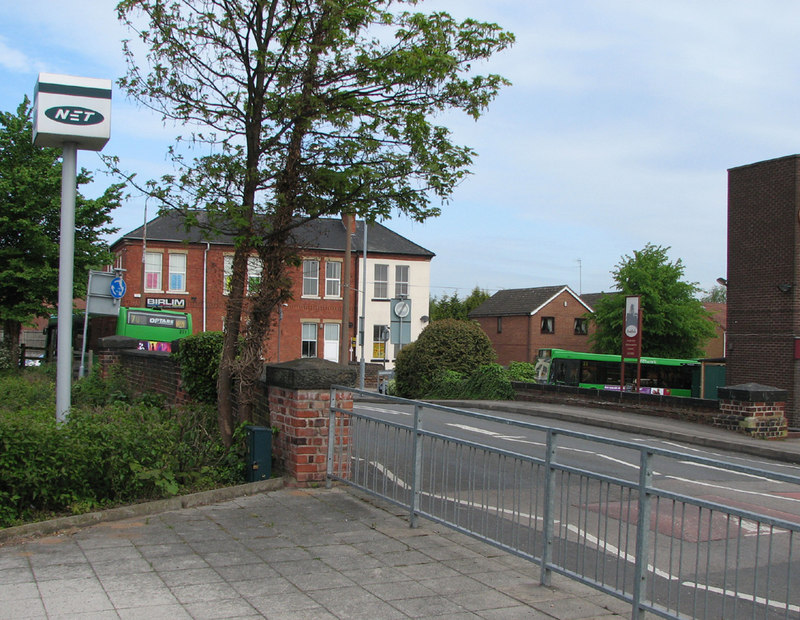
Street level entrance to the stop

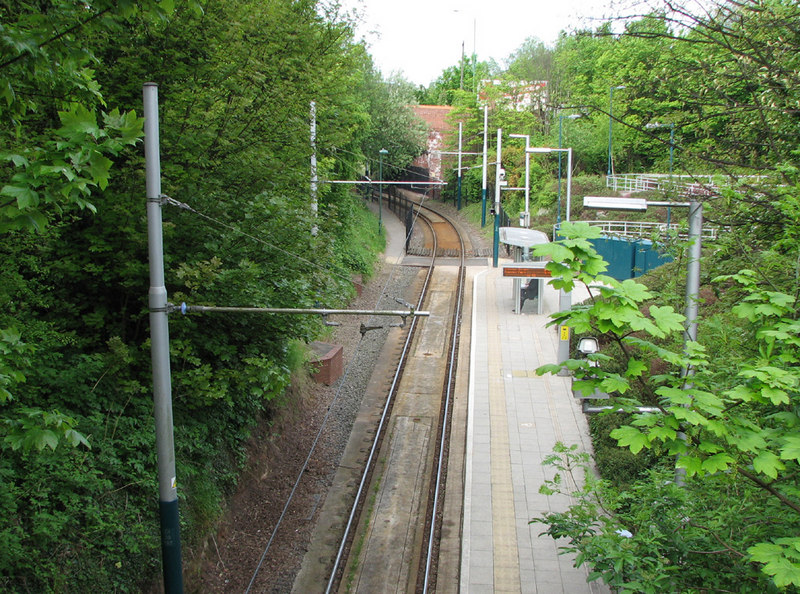
Looking towards Phoenix Park

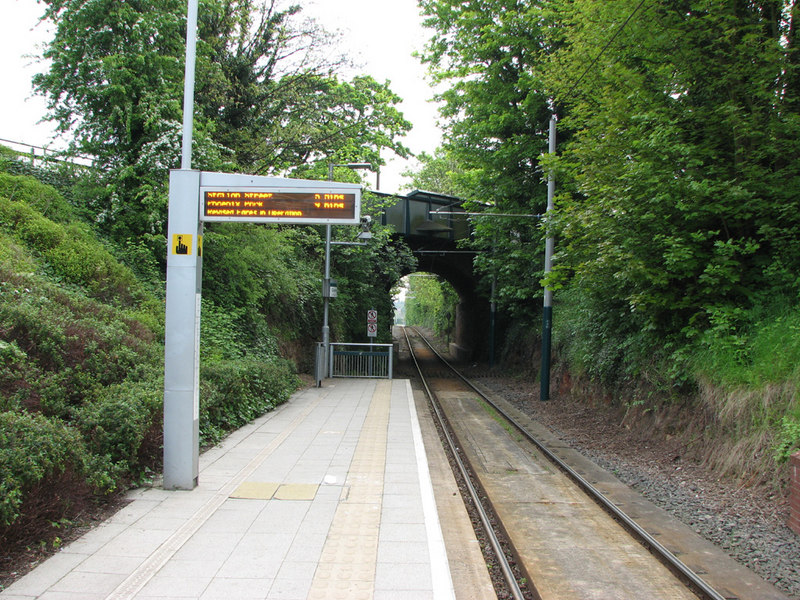
Looking towards Highbury Vale
