= New Basford railway station =

Former railway station in Nottinghamshire, England

Coordinates: 52.9782°N 1.1635°W

New Basford
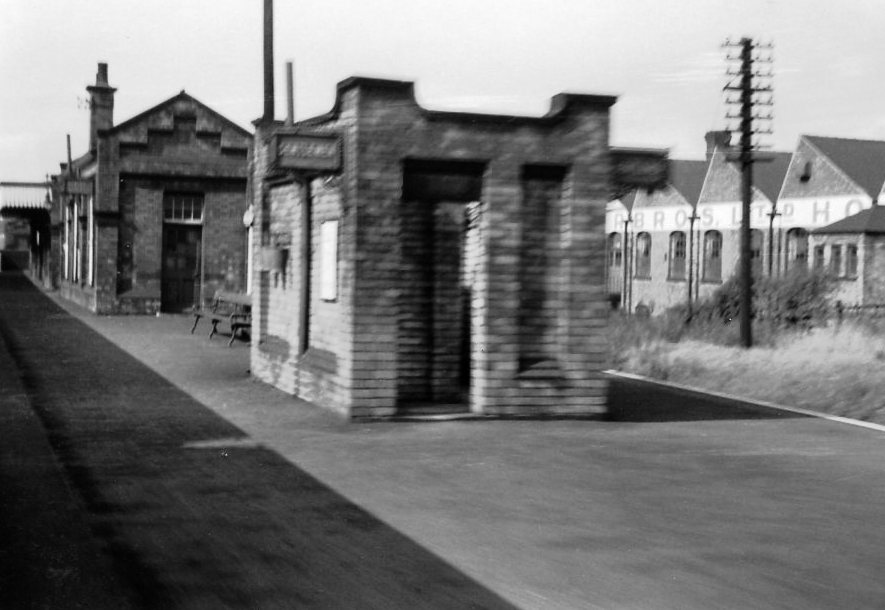

General information
- Location: Basford, Nottingham; England
- Platforms: 2

Other information
- Status: Disused

History
- Original company: Great Central Railway
- Pre-grouping: Great Central Railway
- Post-grouping: London and North Eastern Railway

Key dates
- 15 March 1899: Opened
- 7 September 1964: Closed
Location

New Basford railway station was a station in Nottingham on the Great Central Railway main line, the last main line to be built from the north of England to London. The station opened with the line on 15 March 1899.

== History ==
The station was one of the standard island platform design typical of the London Extension, though here it was the less common "embankment" type reached from a roadway (Haydn Road), that passed beneath the line. A short distance to the south was Sherwood Rise Tunnel.

As well as handling local train services on the Great Central line itself, it was also served by Great Northern Railway trains to Ilkeston, Derby, Uttoxeter and Stafford, on their Derbyshire and Staffordshire Extension, these trains branching off the Great Central about half a mile to the north at Bagthorpe Junction. Having running powers over this section of the Great Central line provided the Great Northern with the most direct route out of Nottingham for these trains, better than their own somewhat roundabout route via Daybrook.

Local passenger services on the Great Central line ceased on 4 March 1963 when most local stations closed, but New Basford remained open until 7 September 1964 as the former Great Northern services continued to run until then, although they had stopped operating beyond Derby Friargate railway station on 4 December 1939. Main line passenger traffic on the Great Central ceased on 5 September 1966; goods traffic to New Basford on 2 October 1967 and this section of the line closed completely on 25 March 1968.

Where New Basford station once stood is now a housing development, but the stationmaster's house still remains.

Preceding station	Disused railways	Following station
Carrington; Line and station closed	Great Central Railway; London Extension	Bulwell Common; Line and station closed
Carrington; Line and station closed	Great Northern Railway (Derby) Friargate Line	Basford & Bulwell; Line and station closed
