= Bassford =

Bassford is a surname. Notable people with the surname include:

- Christopher Bassford (born 1953), American military historian
- Edward Bassford (1837–1912), American architect
- Richard Bassford (born 1936), American illustrator

== See also ==
- Basford (disambiguation)
