= Ellis Guilford School =

Secondary school in Nottingham, England

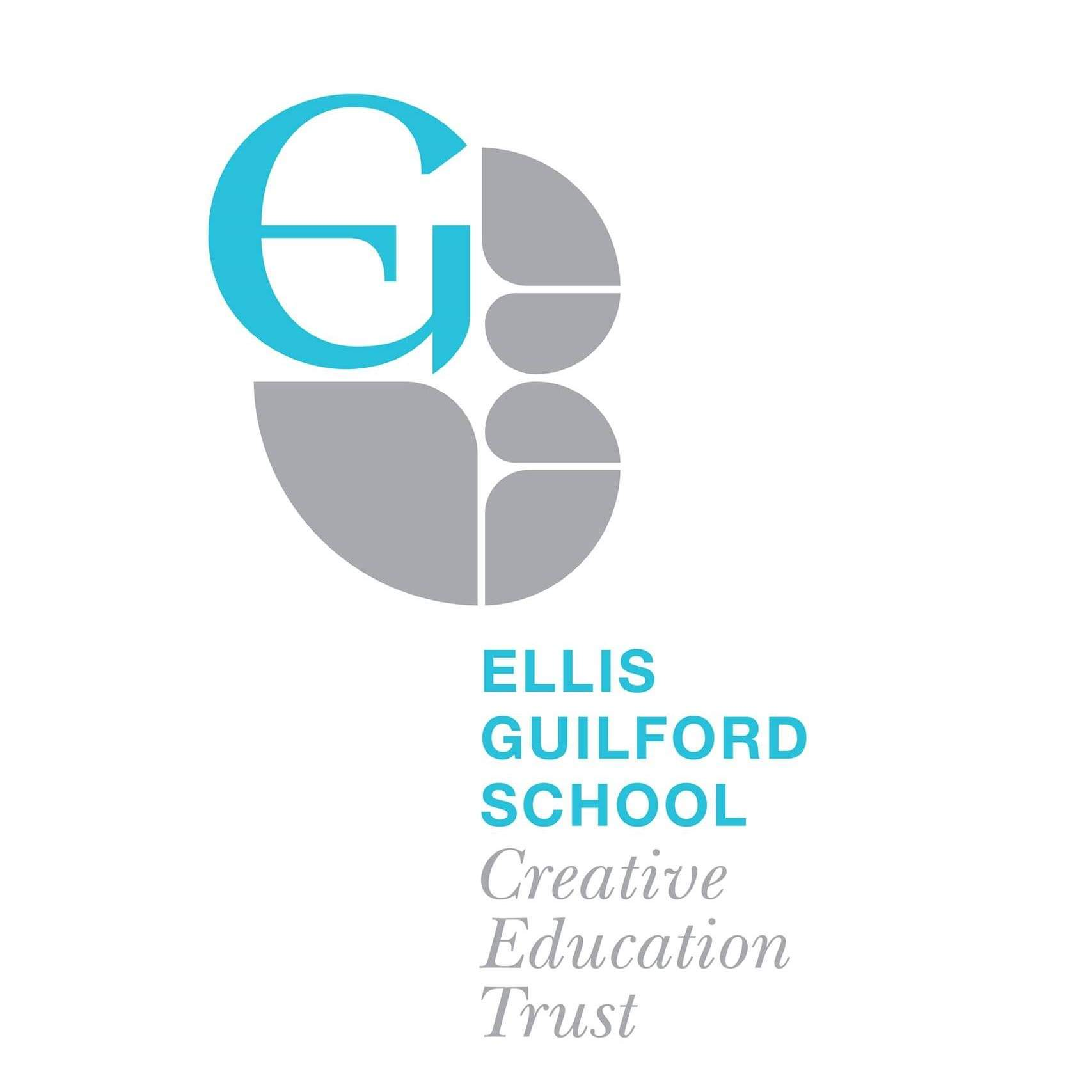
- New Ellis Guilford CET Logo

Location
- Bar Lane; Nottingham, Nottinghamshire, NG6 0HT; England
- Coordinates: 52°58′47″N 1°11′18″W

Information
- Type: Academy as of 1 November 2018
- Motto: Be Your Best
- Established: 1926
- Local authority: Nottingham
- Trust: Creative Education Trust
- Department for Education URN: 146539 Tables
- Ofsted: Reports
- Chair of Governors: Sara Gadzik
- Principal: Gemma Johnson
- Gender: Coeducational
- Age: 11 to 16
- Enrolment: 1350
- Houses: Elion (pink), Bocelli (Green), Chawla (red) and Turing (Purple)
- Website: http://www.ellisguilfordschool.co.uk

The Ellis Guilford School & Sports College is a secondary academy school in Bar Lane, Basford, Nottingham.

== History and performance ==
The school was established in 1926..

In 2001 it was inspected by Ofsted, with the finding that "Pupils’ attainment on entry is well below average overall ... Ellis Guilford School provides a sound education for its pupils within circumstances that are relatively challenging. Although standards in relation to schools nationally are below average, the majority of pupils make at least satisfactory progress". In 2006 and 2010 it was inspected again and judged Good. In 2013 inspection judged it Inadequate because of slow progress made by students and the lack of engaging teaching. In 2015 it was judged Good. In 2018 it was judged Inadequate: Special Measures Required on the grounds of poor teaching, poor outcomes, ineffective safeguarding, low attendance and poor strategic planning.

The school became an academy a month after this inspection, in November 2018. It is part of the Creative Education Trust.

The school was criticised in January 2018 after introducing a ban on pupils cycling to school unless they had passed safety training.
