= Annesley South Junction Halt railway station =

Former minor rail station in England

Coordinates: 53.071°N 1.215°W

Annesley South Junction Halt

General information
- Location: Newstead, Ashfield District; England
- Platforms: 2

Other information
- Status: Disused

History
- Opened: July 1923; 102 years ago
- Closed: September 1962; 63 years ago
- Original company: London and North Eastern Railway
Location

Annesley South Junction Halt is a former halt on the section of the Great Central Main Line between Nottingham Victoria and Sheffield Victoria. The halt was opened by July 1923 and closed on 10 September 1962. The station has been demolished and the former trackbed is a footpath with only the overgrown rear wall of the signal box remaining.

== Former services ==
Preceding station	Disused railways	Following station
Hucknall Central; Line and station closed	Great Central Railway; London Extension	Hollin Well and Annesley; Line and station closed
