= Hucknall Central railway station =

Former railway station in Nottinghamshire, England

Coordinates: 53.0319°N 1.2091°W

Hucknall Central
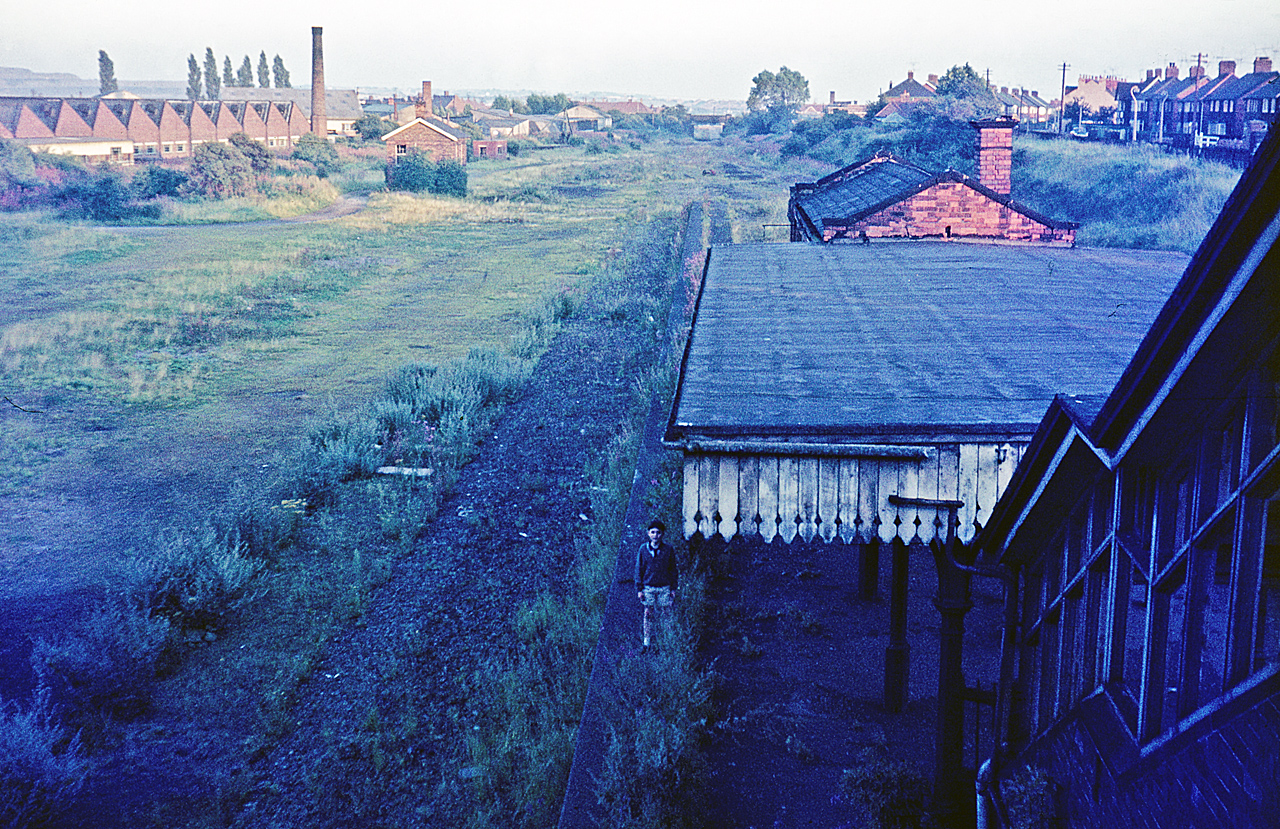

General information
- Location: England
- Platforms: 2

Other information
- Status: Disused

History
- Original company: Great Central Railway
- Pre-grouping: Great Central Railway
- Post-grouping: London and North Eastern Railway

Key dates
- 15 March 1899: Opened
- 4 March 1963: Closed
Location

Hucknall Central railway station, originally known as Hucknall Town, was a station in Hucknall on the Great Central Railway's main line from Manchester to London.

== Construction ==
Hucknall Central was of the larger 'town' variety of stations on the Great Central main line, with access to the island platform being via a footbridge from the booking hall which sat on the eastern side of the line. More comprehensive passenger facilities were provided at Hucknall, similar to Loughborough Central and Rugby Central stations, though not quite as lavish as in those cases. The station was constructed circa 1896–1898 by the contractors Logan and Hemmingway.

== History ==
The station opened as Hucknall Town on 15 March 1899 as part of the Great Central Railway's London extension. Soon after grouping as part of the London and North Eastern Railway, the station was renamed to Hucknall Central on 1 June 1923. The station was closed to both passengers and goods on 4 March 1963, along with most other local stations on the line.

== Present day ==
All that remains of the station is the Watnall Road overbridge between Farleys Lane and Sandy Lane. This road has had the spelling changed to Watnall Road. The cutting in which the station lay has been filled in on both sides of this bridge, with a housing development on the south side.

Preceding station	Disused railways	Following station
Bulwell Hall Halt; Line and station closed	Great Central Railway; London Extension	Annesley South Halt; Line and station closed
