= Bulwell Common railway station =

Former railway station in Nottinghamshire, England

Coordinates: 52.9998°N 1.1829°W

Bulwell Common
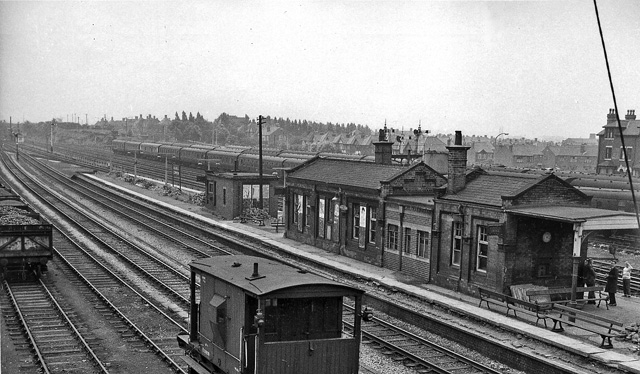
- Bulwell Common station in July 1963, four months after closure and already the platform edging slabs have been removed.

General information
- Location: Bulwell, City of Nottingham; England
- Grid reference: SK549450
- Platforms: 2

Other information
- Status: Disused

History
- Original company: Great Central Railway
- Post-grouping: London and North Eastern Railway

Key dates
- 15 March 1899: Opened
- 4 March 1963: Closed
Location

Bulwell Common railway station was a station in Nottingham on the Great Central Railway main line, the last main line to be built from the north of England to London. The station opened with the line on 15 March 1899.

== History ==
The station was the fourth to serve the northern Nottingham suburb of Bulwell, directly or indirectly, following the Midland Railway (later LMS) station later known as Bulwell Market on their line from Nottingham to Mansfield and Worksop, the Great Northern Railway (later LNER) station called Bulwell Forest on their own route up the Leen Valley and on up to Shirebrook, and that same company's Basford and Bulwell station (later renamed Basford North), on their Derbyshire and Staffordshire Extension to Ilkeston, Derby, Uttoxeter and Stafford. The choice of Bulwell Common as the name for the Great Central station is something of a puzzle, as Nottingham City Council have no record of any common land ever having been designated in the Bulwell area.

The station was one of the standard island platform design typical of the London Extension, and here it was the more common "cutting" type reached from a roadway (St. Albans Road), that crossed over the line. Just to the south, a west-to-north connecting curve from the GNR's Basford and Bulwell station joined the GCR at Bulwell South Junction, while to the north, a connecting spur to the GNR's Leen Valley line branched off north-eastwards at Bulwell North Junction; further north still was the lengthy Bulwell Viaduct which crossed over the Midland line and spanned the Leen Valley, while a short distance to the north of this was a fifth station to bear the name Bulwell - the relatively short-lived Bulwell Hall Halt.

Bulwell Common station was closed to passengers and goods on 4 March 1963, the line itself on 5 September 1966 to passengers and completely on 25 March 1968. Where the station once stood is now a housing development, but the stationmaster's house remains.

=== Station masters ===
- E. Williamson
- F.H. Stables 1945 -1949 (afterwards station master at Lutterworth)
- J.M. Mackness 1949 - ????

| Preceding station | Disused railways | Following station |
|---|---|---|
| New Basford; Line and station closed | Great Central Railway; London Extension | Bulwell Hall Halt; Line and station closed |
