= Witold Gracjan Kawalec =

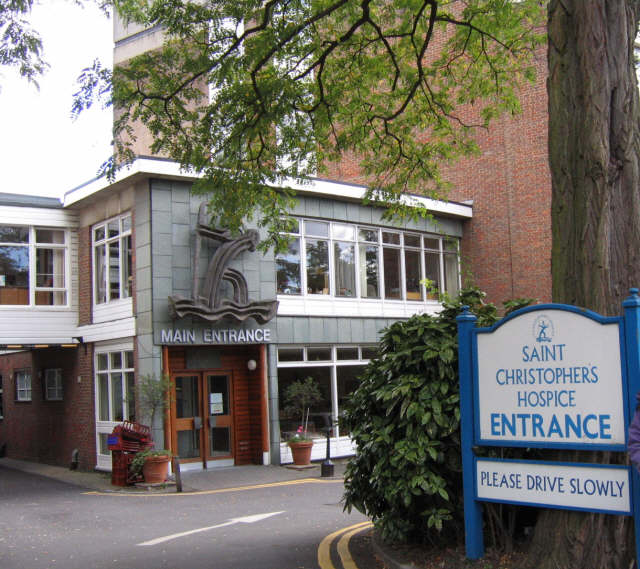
Sculpture over the entrance to St Christopher's Hospice Photo by Stephen Craven

Witold Gracjan Kawalec (17 November 1922 – 24 December 2003) was a Polish-born sculptor, who worked mainly in England.

== Early life ==
He was born in Wilno, Poland in 1922. Working for the Polish resistance movement during World War II, he was captured by Russian soldiers. Later he joined a Polish Army unit in Palestine. He took part in the bitter fighting at Tobruk during the North Africa campaign. From North Africa he joined the Royal Air Force in England.

In 1942 he was accepted for training in the Royal Air Force. While serving near Nottingham he married a fellow Pole in the WRAF, Danuta Banszel. He was then posted to No. 307 Polish Night Fighter Squadron at Exeter.

== Sculpture ==
After the war he moved to Nottingham and continued his studies in sculpture at Nottingham College of Art. In 1953 he opened his first studio and produced much of his work in alabaster. The themes of his abstract forms were influenced by his experiences during World War II. In 1959 he had a piece selected for the Royal Academy summer exhibition, and in 1963 his exhibition at the Drian Gallery led to his connection with the hospice movement. His best known work is the sculpture for Dame Cicely Saunders’s St Christopher's Hospice at Sydenham. It shows St Christopher carrying Christ across the water. The sculpture was unveiled by Princess Alexandra, The Honourable Lady Ogilvy.

In 1966 he created sculptures for Revd Kenneth Cook for the tops of the pillars in St. Aidan's Church, Basford, in Nottingham.

In 1976 he moved and established a sculpture garden in an orchard near Crediton. He created a statue of St Boniface for Crediton Parish Church.
