= St Aidan's Church, Basford =

Coordinates: 52°59′14″N 01°10′45″W

St. Aidan's Church, Basford
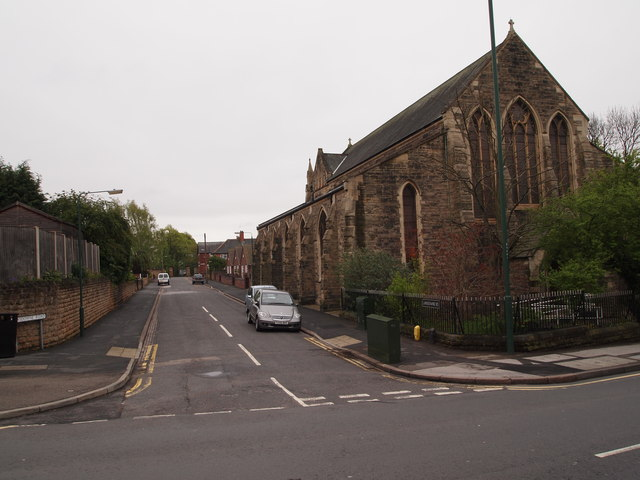
- St. Aidan's Church, Basford
- Denomination: Church of England
- Churchmanship: Broad Church

History
- Dedication: St. Aidan

Administration
- Province: York
- Diocese: Southwell and Nottingham
- Deanery: Deanery of Nottingham North
- Parish: Basford, Nottingham

Clergy
- Vicar: Rev Rich Atkinson (Vicar of Woven)

St. Aidan's Church, Basford is a parish church in the Church of England Diocese of Southwell in Basford, Nottingham.

== History ==
The church was built in 1905 by Robert Evans and Sons, as a chapel of ease to St. Leodegarius Church, Basford.

It was consecrated on 21 February 1905 by the Bishop of Southwell Edwyn Hoskyns.

The church is known for its 1966 carvings at the top of the pillars by the sculptor Witold Gracjan Kawalec, representing Work, Peace, Mercy, Hope, Life, Guidance, Humility, Justice, Grace and Music.
