= Watnall railway station =

Former railway station in Nottinghamshire, England

Coordinates: 53.0033°N 1.2472°W

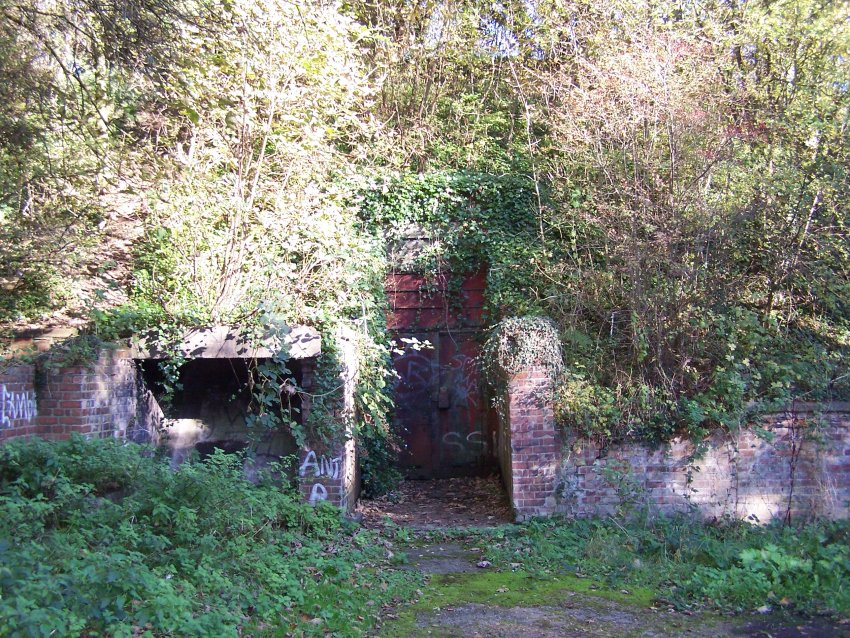
The overgrown entrance to No. 12 Group RAF Fighter Command's Second World War operations bunker.

Watnall railway station was a station serving the village of Watnall in Nottinghamshire, England. The station opened in 1882 and closed in 1917. It was sited at the eastern end of the railway cutting used to provide the Midland Railway with a route through to Kimberley.

The cutting still exists although it is heavily overgrown. Remnants of the platform can be found beneath the undergrowth, but the buildings are no longer in existence. A bunker was built on this site for RAF Watnall during the Second World War and used as an operations centre for No. 12 Group RAF. The headquarters moved to RAF Newton in 1946, but the bunker remained in use for the duration of the ROTOR program and was mothballed in 1961. The bunker was used as a rifle range by the Awsworth – Kimberley and District Rifle Club.

In May 2010, local police discovered a large cannabis factory inside the bunker.

Former services

Preceding station	Disused railways	Following station
Kimberley West; Line and station closed	Midland Railway; Bennerley and Bulwell Railway	Basford Vernon; Line and station closed

== See also ==
- Kimberley East railway station
- Kimberley West railway station
