= Bill Basford =

American politician (1930–2022)

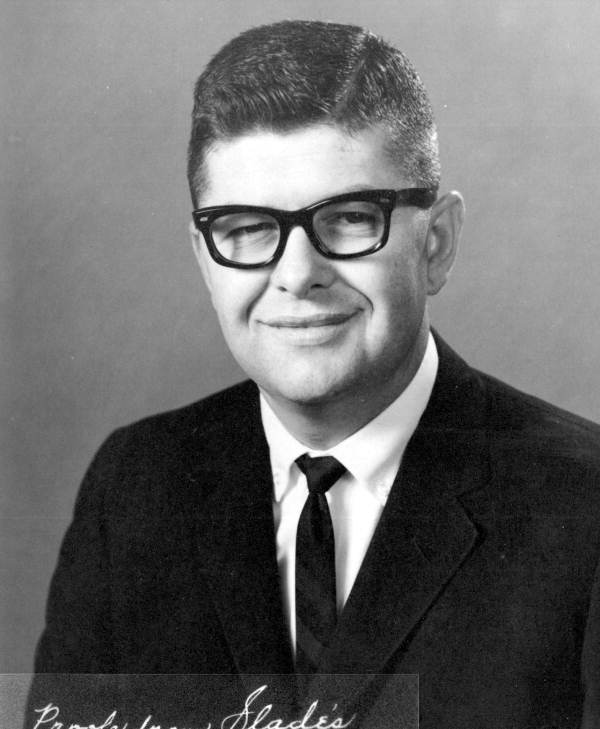

Member of the Florida House of Representatives
- In office 1963–1966

Personal details
- Born: August 28, 1930 Jacksonville, Florida, U.S.
- Died: September 30, 2022 (aged 92) Jacksonville, Florida, U.S.
- Party: Democratic
- Education: University of Florida
- Occupation: Attorney

William Theodore Basford Jr. (August 28, 1930 – September 30, 2022) was an American politician in the state of Florida.

Basford was born in Jacksonville, Florida and was an attorney. He served in the United States Navy and then received his bachelor's and law degrees from University of Florida. He served on the Jacksonville City Council. He served in the Florida House of Representatives from 1963 to 1966, as a Democrat.

Basford died in Jacksonville on September 30, 2022, at the age of 92.
