= Bulwell station =

Railway station and tram stop in Nottinghamshire, England

Bulwell
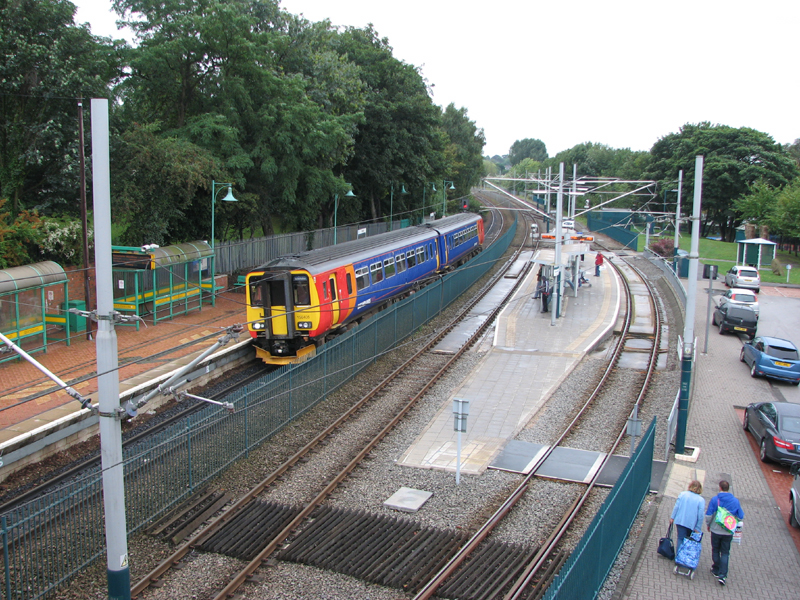

General information
- Location: Bulwell, City of Nottingham, England
- Coordinates: 52°59′58″N 1°11′43″W
- Grid reference: SK540450
- Owner: Network Rail, Nottingham Express Transit
- Operator: East Midlands Railway, Nottingham Express Transit
- Platforms: 3 (Note: Two platforms are used by Nottingham Express Transit services and one by National Rail services)
- Tracks: 3

Other information
- Station code: BLW
- Classification: DfT category F2

History
- Original company: Midland Railway
- Pre-grouping: Midland Railway
- Post-grouping: London, Midland and Scottish Railway; London Midland Region of British Railways

Key dates
- 2 October 1848: Opened as Bulwell
- 11 August 1952: Renamed Bulwell Market
- 12 October 1964: Closed
- 24 May 1994: Reopened as Bulwell
- 9 March 2004: Joined the Nottingham Express Transit network

Passengers
- 2020/21: ▼20,138
- 2021/22: ▲43,504
- 2022/23: ▲56,336
- 2023/24: ▲65,298
- 2024/25: ▲71,838
Location
Notes
- Passenger statistics from the Office of Rail and Road

Bulwell, previously known as Bulwell Market, is a railway station and tram stop serving the town of Bulwell, in Nottinghamshire, England. It is located on the Robin Hood Line and the Hucknall-Toton branch of the Nottingham Express Transit (NET).

== History ==
Bulwell station opened on 2 October 1848, with the opening of the Midland Railway's line from Nottingham to Mansfield. It was the first of several stations to serve the town, including Bulwell Common, Bulwell Forest and Basford and Bulwell. On 11 August 1952, it was renamed Bulwell Market, to distinguish it from the other stations.

It was closed to passenger traffic in 1964, along with all the other stations on the line, but the railway line itself was retained for goods traffic.

In 1993, this line was reopened by British Rail to passenger traffic as part of the new Robin Hood Line; on 24 May 1994, the station reopened under its original name, the other Bulwell stations having closed in the meantime.

In March 2004, the Nottingham Express Transit tram line opened, on an alignment alongside the railway line. The station used to have two platforms, but the down platform was removed to make way for the tram stop.

== Layout ==
The railway has a single line and platform through the station, with the platform on the opposite side of the railway track from the tram stop.

A footbridge links the railway platform with the tram stop, town centre and bus station, crossing both railway and tram tracks. To the south of the station, the line becomes double-track for the rest of its run towards Nottingham. To the north, only a single track is used as far as Kirkby-in-Ashfield station.

The tram stop has an island platform, flanked by twin tram tracks. To the south the twin tracks continue to Highbury Vale tram stop and beyond but, to the north, the line becomes single tracked as far as Bulwell Forest.

== Services ==
=== Railway ===
During the weekday off-peak and on Saturdays, the station is generally served by an hourly service northbound to Mansfield and Worksop, and southbound to Nottingham. During peak hours, the station is also served by an additional two trains per day between Nottingham and Mansfield Woodhouse.

On Sundays, the station is served by a two-hourly service between Nottingham and Mansfield Woodhouse; there is no service to Worksop, but this is due to recommence at during the life of this East Midlands franchise.

Preceding station	National Rail	Following station
Nottingham	East Midlands Railway Robin Hood Line	Hucknall
	Historical railways	
Basford	Midland Railway Robin Hood Line	Terminus

=== Tram ===
Bulwell
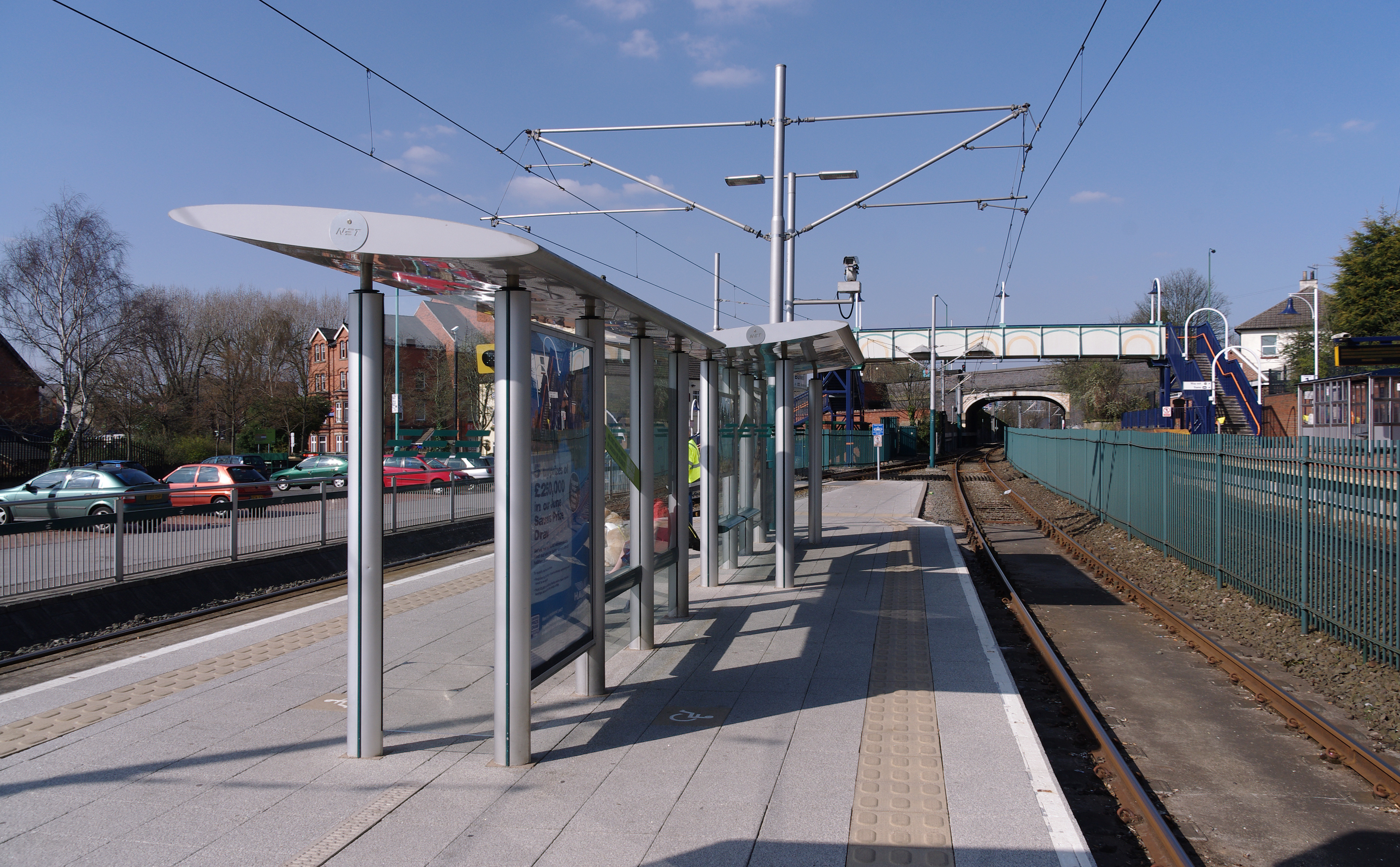

General information
- Location: Bulwell, City of Nottingham, England
- Coordinates: 52°59′57″N 1°11′44″W
- System: Nottingham Express Transit tram stop
- Owner: Nottingham Express Transit
- Operator: Nottingham Express Transit
- Line: 1
- Platforms: 2 (island)
- Tracks: 2

Construction
- Structure type: At grade; on private right of way
- Accessible: Step-free access to platform

Key dates
- 9 March 2004: Opened
Location

With the opening of NET's phase two, Bulwell is now on Line 1, which runs between Hucknall and Toton Lane, via Nottingham station and Beeston transport interchange. Trams run at frequencies that vary between 4 and 8 trams per hour, depending on the day and time of day.

Preceding station	NET	Following station
Bulwell Forest towards Hucknall	Line 1	Highbury Vale towards Toton Lane
