= Bulwell Hall Halt railway station =

Former railway station in Nottinghamshire, England

Coordinates: 53.01398°N 1.19489°W

Bulwell Hall Halt
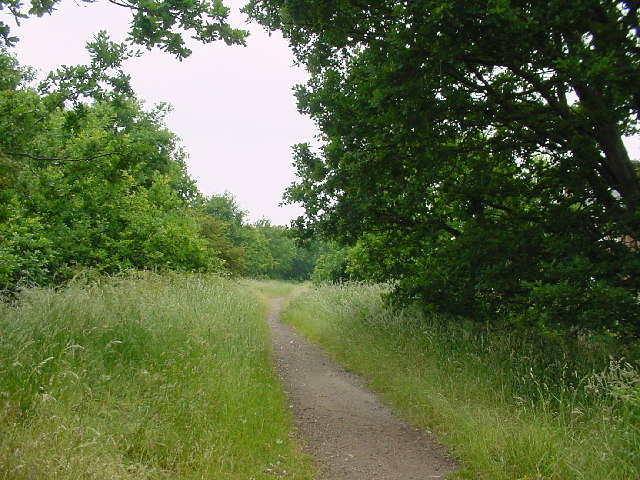

General information
- Location: Bulwell, City of Nottingham; England
- Platforms: 2

Other information
- Status: Disused

History
- Original company: Great Central Railway
- Pre-grouping: Great Central Railway
- Post-grouping: London and North Eastern Railway

Key dates
- 24 April 1909: Opened
- 5 May 1930: Closed
Location

Bulwell Hall Halt railway station was a halt between Nottingham and Hucknall on the Great Central Railway main line, the last main line to be built from the north of England to London, opened on 15 March 1899.

== History ==
Bulwell Hall Halt was opened on 24 April 1909, some 10 years after the line itself - the Great Central Railway's London Extension through Nottingham. The halt had two platforms constructed of timber, and was located approximately 100 yard north of Lawton Drive, or half a mile north of the lengthy Bulwell Viaduct which spanned the Leen Valley.

The halt's main purpose was to serve Nottingham City Golf Course, however during World War I it was also used by troops. It did not appear in public timetables until 1911. Low patronage led to its closure on 5 May 1930; the line itself closed on 5 September 1966.

== Present day ==
No trace of the halt remains today, however a footpath following the railway's trackbed through the site is extant.

Preceding station	Disused railways	Following station
Bulwell Common; Line and station closed	Great Central Railway; London Extension	Hucknall Central; Line and station closed
