= Kimberley West railway station =

Former railway station in Nottinghamshire, England

Coordinates: 52.9997°N 1.2601°W

Kimberley West
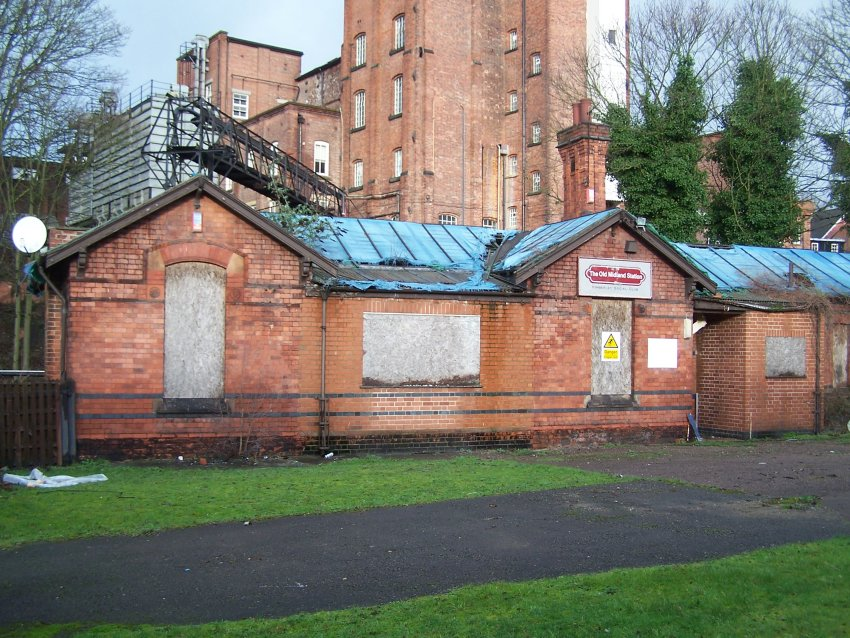
- The Midland Railway's Kimberley Railway Station in 2006

General information
- Location: Kimberley, Broxtowe; England
- Grid reference: SK496449
- Platforms: not known

Other information
- Status: Disused

History
- Original company: Midland Railway
- Pre-grouping: Midland Railway

Key dates
- 1 September 1882: Opened as Kimberley
- 1 January 1917: Closed
Location

Kimberley West railway station was a station serving the town of Kimberley in Nottinghamshire, England.

== History ==
It was built in 1882 for the Midland Railway's Basford to Bennerley Junction branch, at a cost of £2,495 15s 7d, designed by Charles Trubshaw who went on to become a major railway architect. It was designed according to the Arts and Crafts movement to resemble artisan cottages. The rails used in the building of this branch line were taken up from Kimberley station to Bennerley Junction in 1916 and presented to the War Department for use in the battle for the Dardanelles during the First World War. The line from Basford to Kimberley remained in place.

This line is now disused, the station is at one end of a railway cutting through which the branch line ran; this is now designated as a geological Site of Special Scientific Interest under the name of Kimberley Railway Cutting. This cutting is currently the private property of the brewers Greene King at its Kimberley end but a footpath follows its trackbed from Watnall as far as the M1 motorway.

It closed to passenger traffic in 1917 but remained open for goods until 1 January 1951. The station house was used for a while by Kimberley ex-Servicemen's Club and then Kimberley Social Club. The station house has since been restored and as of 2021 is used for private residence, with the properties named Midland Station House.

== Stationmasters ==
- William H. Clarke 1882 - 1889 (formerly station master at Shipley Gate)
- John Ross 1889 - 1894 (formerly station master at Whittington, afterwards station master at Hope)
- Albert C. East 1894 - 1905 (afterwards station master at Codnor Park and Ironville)
- G.H. Archer 1905 - 1908 (formerly station master at Staveley Town)
- H.C. Bryant 1908 - ca. 1914 (formerly station master at Whiteborough)
Former Services

Preceding station	Disused railways	Following station
Ilkeston Town; Line and station closed	Midland Railway; Bennerley and Bulwell Railway	Watnall; Line and station closed

== See also ==
- Kimberley East railway station
- Watnall railway station
