= Joerg Hasford =

German physician and epidemiologist (1950–2021)

Joerg Hasford (9 October 1950 – 10 June 2021) was a German physician, biometrician, and epidemiologist. He had been influential in the study of safety of drugs and pharmacoepidemiology. He was one of the first biostatisticians to look at reliably compiled drug dosing history data in light of pharmacometric consequences. He was the namesake of the Hasford Score, a prognostic score for chronic myeloid leukemia.

== Career ==
Joerg Hasford received his training as a physician at the Free University of Berlin and LMU Munich in Bavaria. He graduated in 1979 and received his Dr.med. with honors from the Free University of Berlin in 1980. From 1979 until 1990, he worked at the Biometric Centre for Therapeutic Studies, a nonprofit institution in Munich; from 1984 until 1990, he was its scientific director. In 1989, he received his Habilitation for Medical Biometry and Epidemiology at LMU Munich, where he was appointed full tenure professor in 1994. Hasford served as associate editor for Controlled Clinical Trials from 1995 to 2000; Editor for Europe of Pharmacoepidemiology and Drug Safety from 2008 to 2015. Upon departing this editorship in 2015, he was commended with the following statement: “Professor Hasford began processing European manuscripts in 2007 with founding editor Ronald Mann, and assumed the role of Regional Editor for all of Europe in 2008. The following year, submissions to Europe totaled 129 for the year, one-third of all submissions to Pharmacoepidemiology and Drug Safety. By 2014, he managed more than 200 manuscripts. Professor Hasford was awarded a certificate at the 31st International Conference on Pharmacoepidemiology and Therapeutic Risk Management in Boston, Massachusetts, in August 2015, in recognition of his dedication and commitment as Regional Editor for Europe.”

He was a founding member of the German Drug Utilization Research Group and of the International Society of Pharmacovigilance and was chairman of the Ethics Committee of the Physicians’ Chamber of the Free State of Bavaria and president of the Association of the Research Ethics Committees in Germany. He was a member of the Expert Group on Clinical Trials of the European Commission.

== Research ==
Since 1983, Hasford serves as the responsible biostatistician of the German Chronic Myeloid Leukemia Study Group which runs randomized long term clinical trials. He performs prognostic research and has published as the main author several properly validated prognostic scores for chronic myeloid leukemia and lymphoma including the Hasford Score. In pharmacoepidemiology, he specialized in drug utilization research, in particular with pregnant women and with pharmacy claims data, patients’ compliance and persistence. He was a member of the European Network of Centres for Pharmacoepidemiology and Pharmacovigilance which is coordinated by the European Medicines Agency.

== Awards ==
- Hasford and his coauthors received the Paul Martini Prize for the development and validation of a new prognostic score for patients with Chronic Myeloid Leukemia in 2000.
- Hasford with colleagues received the Felix Burda Preis for Medical Prevention in 2003.
- Hasford became a Fellow of the Society for Clinical Trials in 2008.

== Publications ==
Hasford has authored and coauthored over 200 Medline-listed publications
