= Basford North railway station =

Former railway station in Nottinghamshire, England

Coordinates: 52.99024°N 1.18342°W

Basford North
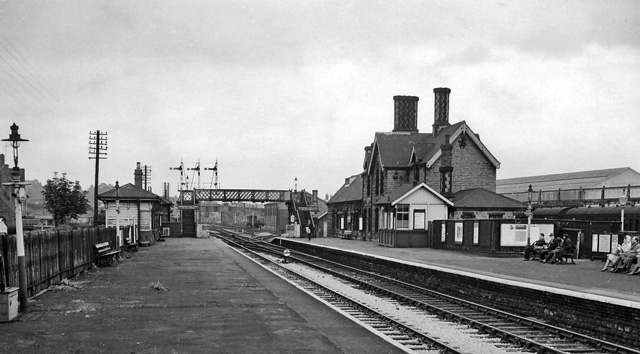
- Basford North Station on 21 August 1963

General information
- Location: Old Basford, Nottingham; England
- Grid reference: SK549439
- Platforms: 2

Other information
- Status: Disused

History
- Original company: Great Northern Railway
- Pre-grouping: Great Northern Railway
- Post-grouping: London and North Eastern Railway; London Midland Region of British Railways

Key dates
- 1 February 1876: Opened as New Basford
- 1 August 1876: Renamed Basford and Bulwell
- 21 September 1953: Renamed Basford North
- 7 September 1964: Closed to passengers
- 2 October 1967: Goods facilities withdrawn
Location

Basford North railway station was a railway station which served Basford and Bulwell in Nottinghamshire, England. It was close to the River Leen, which the line crossed on a nine-arch brick viaduct.

== History ==
Built by the Great Northern Railway on its Derbyshire Extension in 1875–6 the station was originally called Dob Park, as it was built on land belonging to that estate, but was quickly renamed to Basford and Bulwell and later renamed again to Basford North in order to avoid confusion with the nearby Midland Railway station originally named Basford which opened in 1848.

The station closed to passengers in 1964 and to goods three years later. There were further stations in Bulwell at Bulwell Common, Bulwell Forest and Bulwell Hall Halt.

=== Station masters ===
- Mr. Snell 1907 - 1910 (also station master at Basford)
- J. Davis 1910 - 1922 (formerly station master at Spondon)
- Louis B. Parley ???? - 1928 (afterwards station master at Spalding)
- T. Hibbert 1931 - ????
- W.W. Capon 1934 - 1936 (afterwards station master at Nottingham Victoria)
- A. Burton 1936 - ???? (formerly station master at Beighton and also Woodhouse. Also appointed station master of New Basford)
- W.H. Burton 1940 - ???? (formerly station master at Woodhouse)
- Herbert Bonner 1943 - 1945
- G.O. Smith 1946 - 1949 (formerly station master at Wrexham (Central), afterwards station master at Finsbury Park)
- A. Shepherd 1950 (formerly station master at Wrexham (Central))

Preceding station	Disused railways	Following station
Daybrook	London Midland Region of British Railways (Derby) Friargate Line	Kimberley

== Present day ==
An industrial estate and a housing development completed in 2019 occupy the former site of the station.
