= Kimberley East railway station =

Former railway station in Nottinghamshire, England

Coordinates: 52.9984°N 1.2582°W

Kimberley East
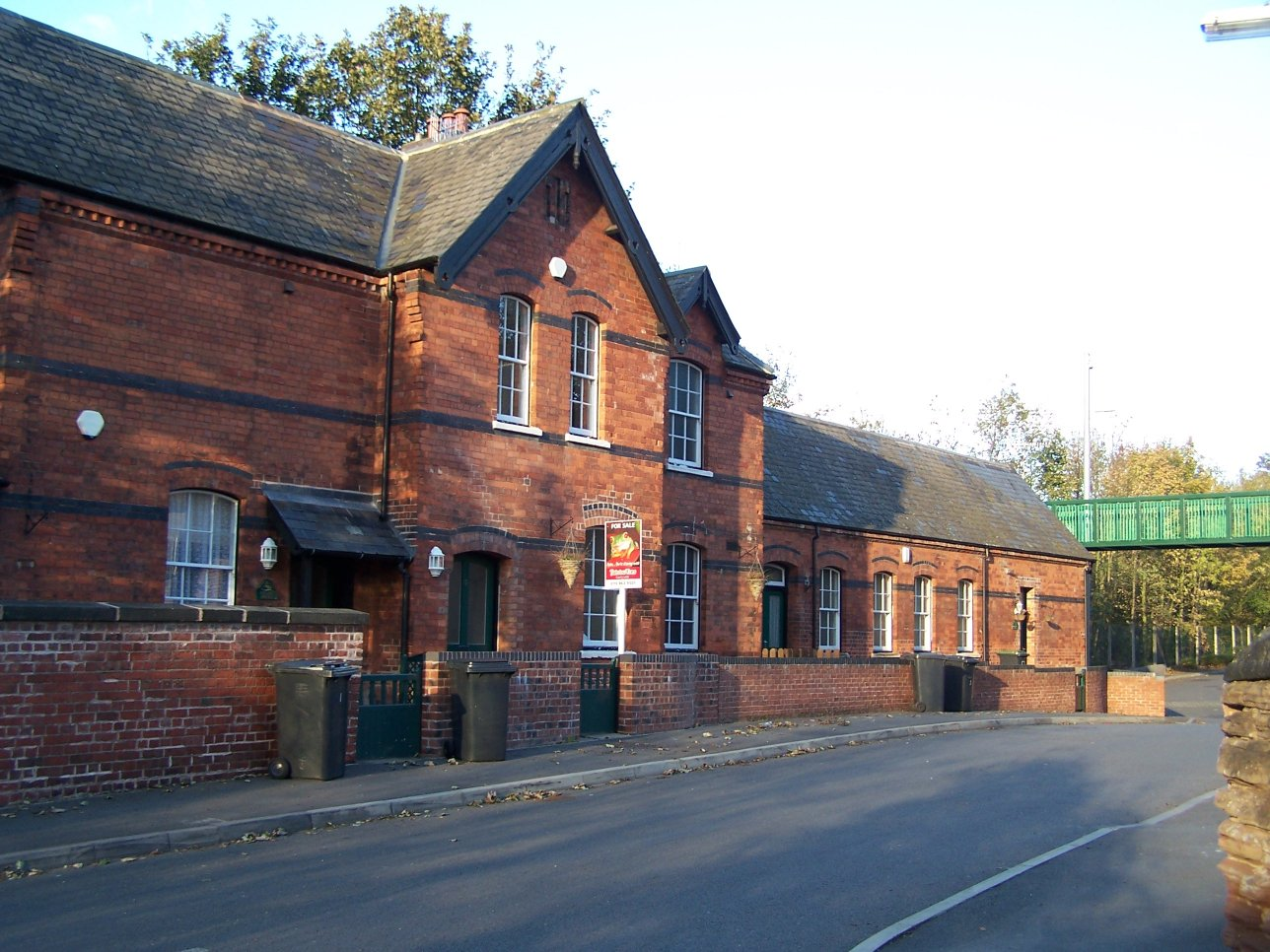
- The station in 2006.

General information
- Location: Kimberley, Broxtowe; England
- Grid reference: SK498448
- Platforms: 2

Other information
- Status: Disused

History
- Original company: Great Northern Railway
- Pre-grouping: Great Northern Railway
- Post-grouping: London and North Eastern Railway; London Midland Region of British Railways

Key dates
- 1 August 1876: Opened as Kimberley
- 13 June 1955: Renamed Kimberley East
- 7 September 1964: Closed to passengers
- 2 November 1964: Goods facilities withdrawn
Location

Kimberley East Railway Station was a station serving the town of Kimberley in Nottinghamshire, England.

== History ==
It was opened by the Great Northern Railway on its Derbyshire Extension in 1875–6

It was on the second summit on the climb through Watnall Tunnel from Basford and Bulwell of what was a hilly line, crossing, as it did, several river valleys. Passenger services finished in 1964 and the line finally closed in 1968.

Following the trackbed of this line takes you to the Bennerley Viaduct. This is a grade II listed structure which is still in place on the Nottinghamshire, Derbyshire border.

Kimberley's other station was on a line from the Midland Railway's Erewash Valley Line to Nottingham.

=== Stationmasters ===
- Samuel Packman ca. 1879
- Thomas Hutchinson ca. 1891 - 1893
- James Brook 1893 - 1908
- George Charles Pike 1908 - 1932
- Joseph Mills Reddish 1932 - 1940
- F.H. McArthur until 1944 (afterwards station master at Eastwood and Langley Mill)
- Joseph George Watts 1944 - ca. 1950 (formerly station master at Daybrook)
- H.H. Mather ca. 1953 (formerly station master at West Hallam)

| Preceding station | Disused railways | Following station |
|---|---|---|
| Basford North | London Midland Region of British Railways (Derby) Friargate Line | Awsworth |

== Present day ==
The line is now disused although it can still be traced and is used by walkers and horse riders from Kimberley as far as Hempshill Vale towards Nottingham where its trackbed has been used to accommodate Hempshill Hall Primary School.

The station buildings have been converted to residential accommodation. Part of the site of the station platforms is occupied by a car park and commercial workshop units. The former goods yard was occupied as a timber storage yard for many years but was subsequently redeveloped for housing. The rest of the station site and the trackbed towards Watnall (as far as the Newdigate Street road bridge where the cutting has been filled) has been preserved as a nature reserve.

== See also ==
- Kimberley West railway station
- Watnall railway station
