= Harry Elsworth Basford =

American politician

Harry Elsworth Basford (May 21, 1908 – June 18, 1974) was an American farmer, tool and die maker, and politician.

Basford was born in Deer River, Itasca County, Minnesota and went to the local public schools. He also went to vocational school and University of Minnesota. He lived in Wolf Lake, Becker County, Minnesota with his wife and family and was a dairy farmer and too and die maker. Basford served in the Minnesota House of Representatives from 1949 to 1962. He died at his home in Wolf River, Minnesota.
