= Snape Wood =

Area of Nottingham, England

Coordinates: 53.004°N 1.216°W

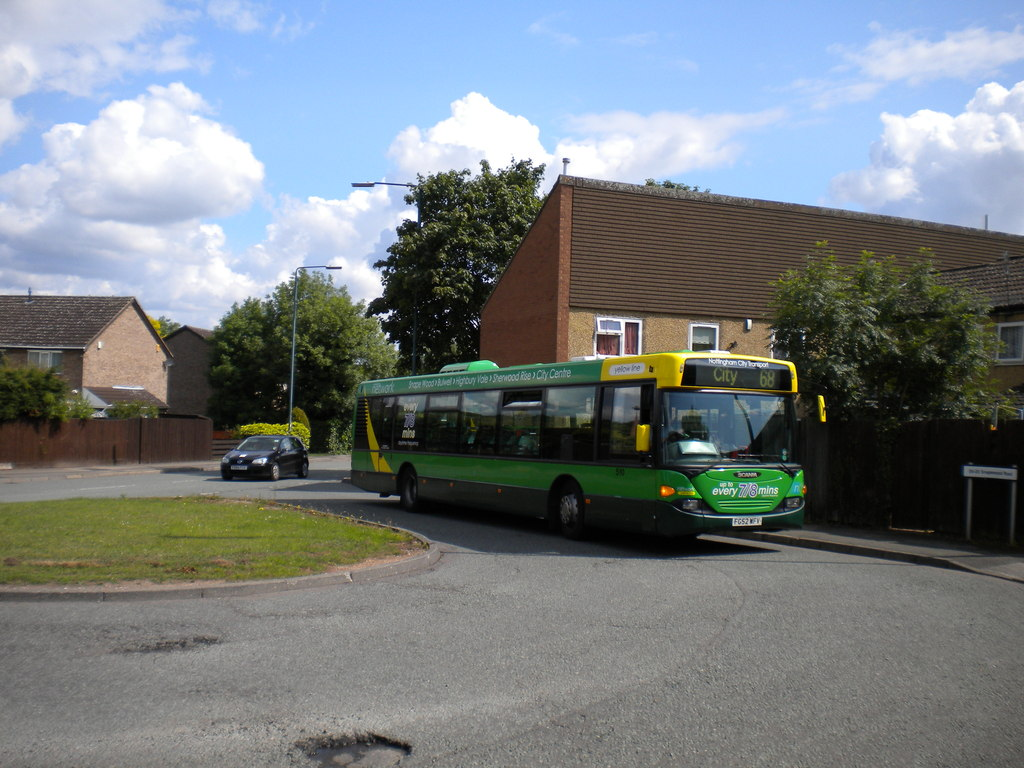
- Bus turning round at Snape Wood in June 2011

- Location within Nottinghamshire
- Population: 2,937
- OS grid reference: SK 52604 45508
- Unitary authority: Nottingham
- Ceremonial county: Nottinghamshire
- Region: East Midlands
- Country: England
- Sovereign state: United Kingdom
- Post town: NOTTINGHAM
- Postcode district: NG6
- Dialling code: 0115
- Police: Nottinghamshire
- Fire: Nottinghamshire
- Ambulance: East Midlands
- UK Parliament: Nottingham North

Snape Wood is a council estate located in Bulwell Ward in the City of Nottingham in Nottinghamshire, England. The estate is located 4.4 miles (7 km) from the City Centre, and lies west of Bulwell, north of Hempshill Vale, south of Hucknall and east of Nuthall. At the 2001 census, the estate had a population of 2,937.

== Facilities ==
Snape Wood has facilities located on Snape Wood Road including a community centre, a family centre, a driving school, and a small park next to the community centre, and there's also a primary school and a local newsagents located off Aspen Road.

== Demographics ==
According to the 2001 census data, the estate has a population of 2,937. A majority of the population is aged 25–44 who make up 32% of the population. The census also shows that 91.7% of the estate's population is White, 3.4% is Mixed Race, 1.4% is Asian or Asian British, and 3.3% is Black or Black British. Chinese people and other ethnic groups each make up 0.1% of the estate's population.

== Religion ==
The 2001 census shows that 59.6% of the population are Christian and 27.8% of the population have no religion. 1.1% of the population are Muslim, 0.3% of Hindu, 0.2% Sikh, and Buddhism and Judaism each score 0.1%. 10.7% of the population did not state their religion.

== Notable people ==
- Emily Campbell, Olympic weightlifter, grew up in Snape Wood.

== Bus services ==
Bus services in Snape Wood, Nottingham
Bus operator	Line	Destination(s)	Notes
Nottingham City Transport	68	Nottingham → Sherwood Rise → Basford → Highbury Vale → Bulwell → Hempshill Vale → Snape Wood	
Nottingham City Transport	68A	Nottingham → Sherwood Rise → Basford → Highbury Vale → Bulwell → Hempshill Vale → Blenheim Industrial Estate → Snape Wood	
Nottingham City Transport	68B	Snape Wood → Bulwell	
Nottingham City Transport	69	Nottingham → Sherwood Rise → Basford → Highbury Vale → Bulwell → Snape Wood → Hempshill Vale	
Nottingham City Transport	69A	Nottingham → Sherwood Rise → Basford → Highbury Vale → Bulwell → Blenheim Industrial Estate → Snape Wood	
Nottingham City Transport	69B	Snape Wood → Hempshill Vale → Bulwell	
