= St Leodegarius Church, Basford =

Coordinates: 52°58′21″N 01°10′50″W

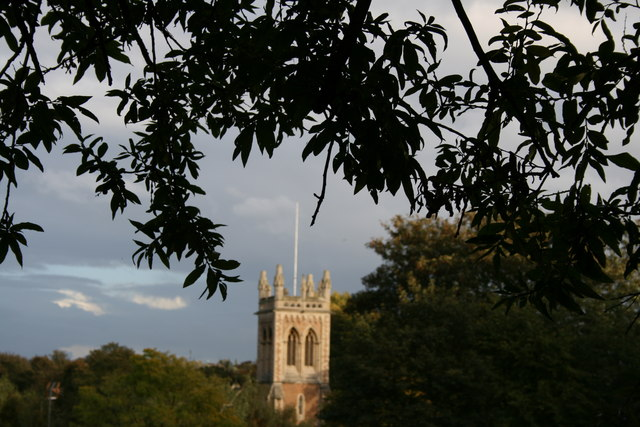
- St Leodegarius Church, Basford
- Denomination: Church of England
- Churchmanship: Broad Church
- Website: www.wearewoven.church/stleos

History
- Dedication: Leodegar

Administration
- Province: York
- Diocese: Southwell and Nottingham
- Deanery: Nottingham North
- Parish: St Leodegarius with St Aidan Old Basford

Clergy
- Vicar: Rev Lydia Corbett

St Leodegarius Church, Old Basford is a parish church in the Church of England.

The church is Grade II* listed by the Department for Digital, Culture, Media and Sport as it is a particularly significant building of more than local interest.

== History ==
The chancel dates from the 1180s and the south arcade from c1250. The south aisle and porch date from around 1340. However the church has been heavily restored and rebuilt between 1858 and 1859 by Arthur Wilson, and again when the tower collapsed in 1859, by Thomas Allom. In 1856 a new church of Christ Church, Cinderhill was created in the parish followed in 1905 by a new church of St. Aidan's Church, Basford.

It is one of only four churches in England named after St. Leodegarius. The other three are Ashby St Ledgers, Hunston, West Sussex and Wyberton.

A chest tomb in the church yard to the south dates from the 17th Century is grade II listed.

== Bells ==
The tower houses a peal of 8 bells from the firm of John Taylor and Co in Loughborough dating from 1921. They are the memorial to the fallen men of Basford for World War One.

== Organ ==
The church had an organ by Henry Jones installed in 1902. This was destroyed in an arson attack in 1974 and a replacement organ by J. W. Walker & Sons Ltd was installed in 1977.

== Services and events ==
- Sunday 10.30am Eucharist or Service of the Word.

== Contact ==
Church Office Tel 0115 929 8899

== See also ==
- Grade II* listed buildings in Nottinghamshire
- Listed buildings in Nottingham (Basford ward)

== Sources ==
Pevsner, Nikolaus (1979). Nottinghamshire (Pevsner Architectural Guides: Buildings of England). Harmondsworth, Middx. Penguin. ISBN 978-0300096361.
