= Basford, Nottingham =

Northerly suburb of Nottingham, England

Coordinates: 52.978°N 1.169°W

Basford
- Suburb
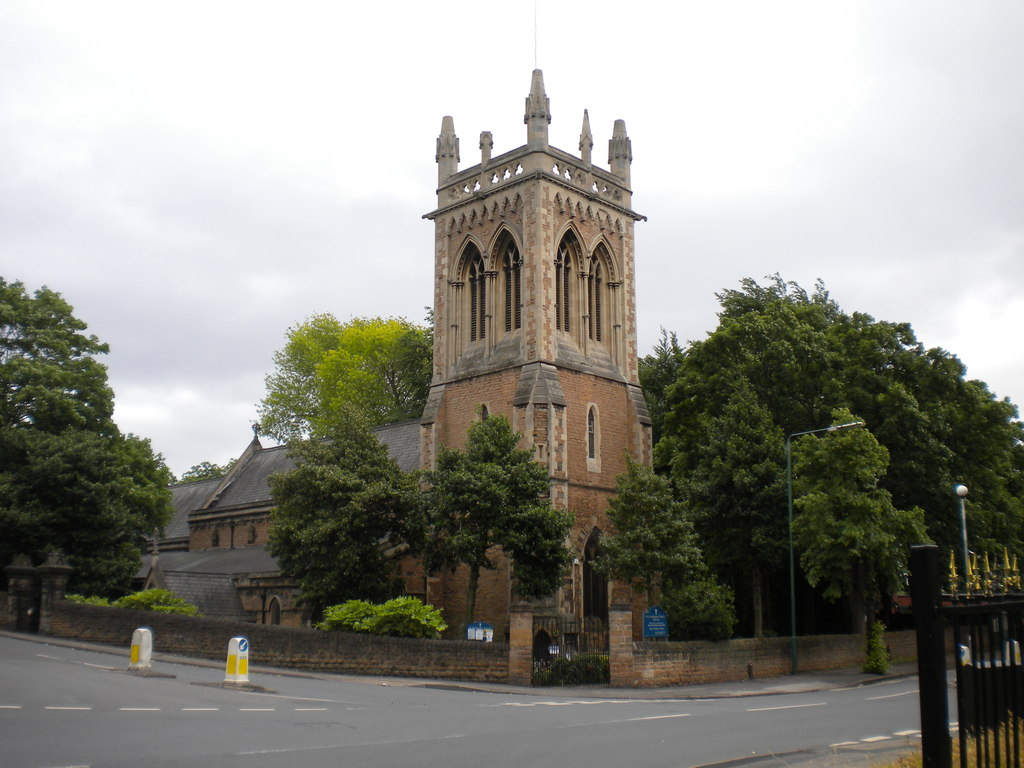
- St Leodegarius's church

- Location within Nottinghamshire
- Population: 16,207 (ward. 2011)
- OS grid reference: SK 55791 42652
- Unitary authority: Nottingham
- Ceremonial county: Nottinghamshire
- Region: East Midlands
- Country: England
- Sovereign state: United Kingdom
- Post town: NOTTINGHAM
- Postcode district: NG6 / NG7
- Dialling code: 0115
- Police: Nottinghamshire
- Fire: Nottinghamshire
- Ambulance: East Midlands
- UK Parliament: Nottingham North

Basford /ˈbeɪsfərd/ is a northerly suburb of Nottingham, in Nottinghamshire, England, incorporated into the city in 1877. It gave its name to Basford Rural District, which existed from 1894 to 1974. The ward population at the 2011 census was 16,207, estimated at 16,779 in 2019. Next to Old Basford is New Basford, which is mainly Victorian. Basford lies close to the River Leen, a tributary of the River Trent. It is linked to Nottingham City Centre to the south and Hucknall and Bulwell to the north by the Nottingham Express Transit tram service.

== Toponymy ==
The name appears as Baseford in the Domesday survey of 1086; Basford contains the Old English personal name Basa, + ford (Old English), 'a ford', so 'Basa's ford'.

== History ==
"Basford Parish lies principally in the vale of the Leen, where that river is augmented by two small streams called the Day Brook and White Moor Spring; but its eastern extremity rises to the lofty hills of Mapperley. It extends from one and a half to three miles north of Nottingham, and comprises 2270 acres of land, of which 1158 acres were enclosed in 1792, and several large tracts have since been covered with thriving plantations. It has generally a rich sandy soil, and lets for upwards of 30s per acre; but some small allotments are let for more than double that amount. It was anciently divided into several manors, and held of the fee of William Peverel, whose Honour Court was formerly held here. The Duke of Newcastle is lord of the manor, and owner of a large portion of the land. At Scottom, near the Leen, are three covered springs and a large reservoir, formed in 1827, for the purpose of supplying the Nottingham Old Water Works. It is to the lace and hosiery manufacturers and its contiguity to Nottingham, that Basford Parish owes its present wealth and consequence; and from which causes its population has increased during the last fifty years, from 2,124 to 10,093 souls in 1851; in consequence of which, several new villages have been built in the parish, which now contains eight bleaching establishments, a great number of stocking frames, and bobbin net machines."

Close to Basford Register Office is the site of a former workhouse. This was used for Basford and for neighbouring parishes. The workhouse later became a maternity hospital and then a psychiatric hospital.

Near Vernon Park there used to be a complex of high-rise flats which consisted of horizontal and vertical blocks connected by aerial concrete walkways. These were demolished in 1983.

Basford has a range of shops in its extensive area. Home to Vernon Park, Basford also has football teams who play there. The senior Football Club in the area is Basford United (formed 1900) who play home games at Greenwich Avenue and currently play in the Premier Division of the Northern Premier League. There is a Bulwell and Basford Rotary Club.

For many years one of the largest industries in Basford was soap manufacturing – a factory was established in the 1890s by Gerard Bros., which in 1955 was acquired by Cussons Sons & Co, manufacturer of Cussons Imperial Leather soap. In 2005 the factory was closed and production moved to Thailand.

Basford was well served by railways, with three stations bearing its name in one form or another. Basford Vernon was the earliest, on the Midland Railway's Nottingham to Mansfield Line. The next to be built was Basford North on the Great Northern Railway, which was originally called Dob Park from the land it was built on, then later Basford & Bulwell. Finally came New Basford on the Great Central Main Line. Basford North and New Basford closed along with the lines on which they were situated. Basford Vernon closed in 1964 but the line on which it stood remained open for freight and was subsequently reopened to passengers as the Robin Hood Line. The station itself did not reopen, but it is now the site of Basford tram stop on the Nottingham Express Transit.

The headquarters of the Nottinghamshire Miners' Association were in Basford for many years.

Basford had three breweries, of which Shipstones is most widely known. The other two were Basford Brewery (taken over via Shipstones) and the Prince of Wales Brewery in Old Basford, which is long closed, although its buildings remain much as built, now serving as Murphy's Chemical Works in Alpine Street.

In the late 19th century, grocer F. G. Garton established a pickles and sauce factory near his home in Sandon Street to prepare a brown sauce, registering its name, “HP Sauce”, in 1895 (it is now made by Heinz in the Netherlands).

In 1891 the civil parish had a population of 22,781. On 1 April 1899 the parish was abolished and merged with Nottingham.

== Demography ==
According to the 2011 census, Basford has a population of 17,277. The average household size is 2.20 people and the population density 42.80 people per hectare.

Basford is a multi-cultural area. Old Basford is predominantly white but New Basford is more diverse. Overall, according to the 2011 census, it has 70.1 per cent of White British and 29.9 per cent of other ethnicities, including 11.5 per cent Caribbean, 3.3 per cent Indian, 2.7 per cent Pakistani and 3.3 per cent other European. According to the survey, Basford includes people from 51 countries outside the UK.

The suburb includes a number of Sikh gurdwaras, Muslim mosques, Hindu, Taoist, Confucianist and Buddhist temples, Jewish synagogues, and churches of Asian, African, Arab, European, Caribbean and South American origin. The main Christian denominations have St Aidan's Church (Church of England), St Leodegarius Church (Church of England) and Basford Road Baptist Church. The nearest Roman Catholic church is Our Lady of Perpetual Succour in Brooklyn Road, Bulwell. The Nottingham Basford congregation of Jehovah's Witnesses also has a hall.

== Education ==
Children in the Basford area usually attend Southwark Primary and Infants School, Heathfield Primary School, Whitemoor Primary School or Old Basford School. The only secondary school in the area is the Ellis Guilford School and Sports College in Bar Lane. This has been refurbished with a new school building, changing rooms, sports hall, tennis courts and football pitches.

== Transport ==
=== Trams ===
Basford is served by several stops of the Nottingham Express Transit system including Shipstone Street, Wilkinson Street (inc Park & Ride), Basford, David Lane and Highbury Vale, which is the nearest stop to the Basford United stadium at Greenwich Avenue.

=== Buses ===
Basford is served by Bus Nos 68, 69, 70 and 71 on the NCT Yellow Line.

== Business parks ==
Basford has three business parks: Rani Drive, Bar Lane and Park Lane.

== Notable people ==
- Bomi Bulsara (1908–2003) and Jer Bulsara (1922–2016), parents of Freddie Mercury, lived in Basford

== See also ==
- Listed buildings in Nottingham (Basford ward)
