= Robin Hood Line =

Railway line in Nottinghamshire, England

Coordinates: 53.14207°N 1.19851°W

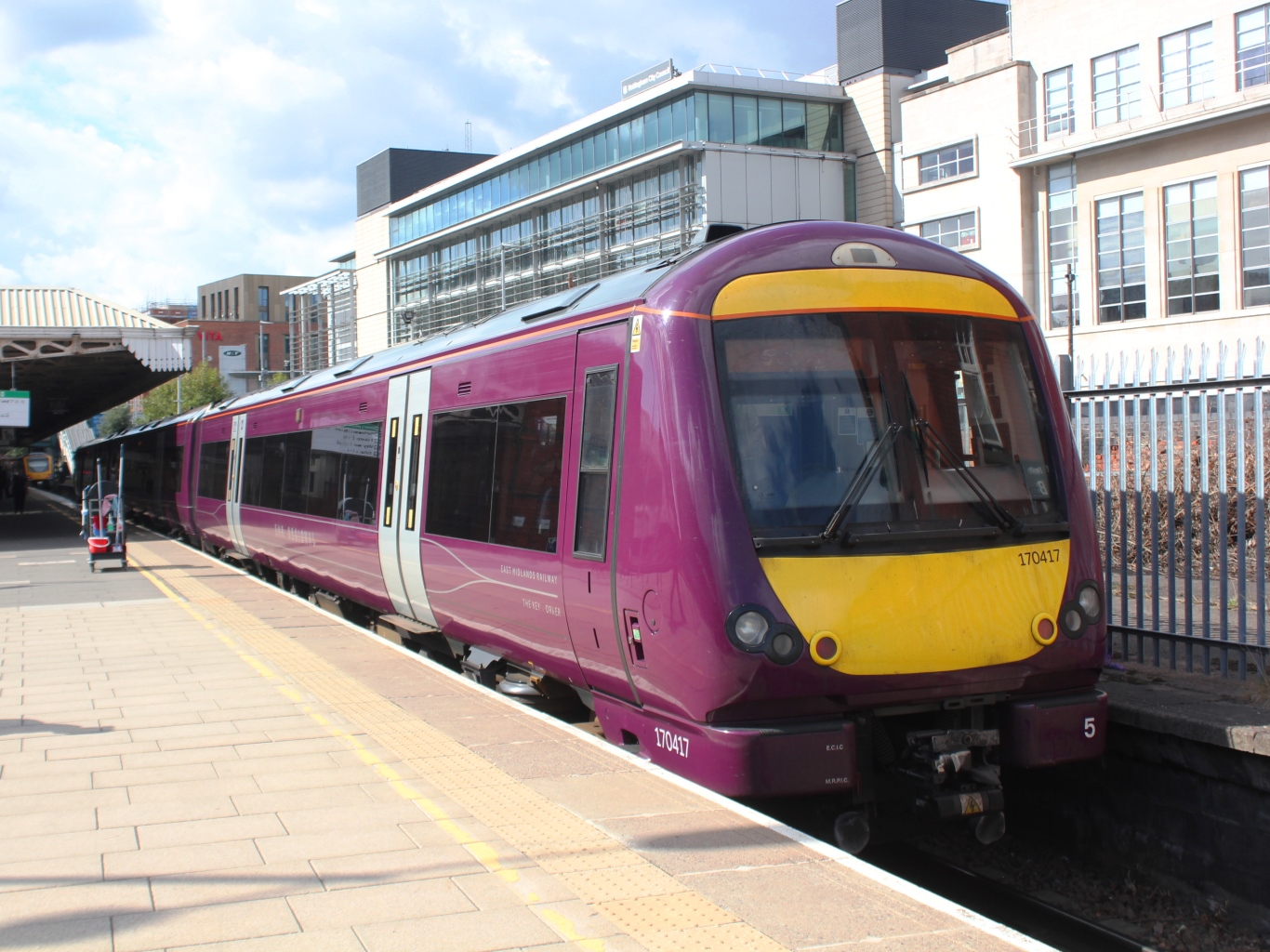
- East Midlands Railway Service to Worksop at Nottingham

Overview
- Status: Operational
- Owner: Network Rail
- Locale: Nottinghamshire; Derbyshire; East Midlands
- Termini: Worksop; Nottingham
- Stations: 13

Service
- Type: Heavy rail
- System: National Rail
- Operator: East Midlands Railway
- Rolling stock: Class 158 Express Sprinter; Class 170 Turbostar

History
- Opened: 1848
- Closed: 1960s
- Reopened: 1993–1998

Technical
- Number of tracks: Mostly Double Track, with a Single track section between Bulwell and Kirkby-in-Ashfield.
- Track gauge: 1,435 mm (4 ft 8 1/2 in) standard gauge
Route map
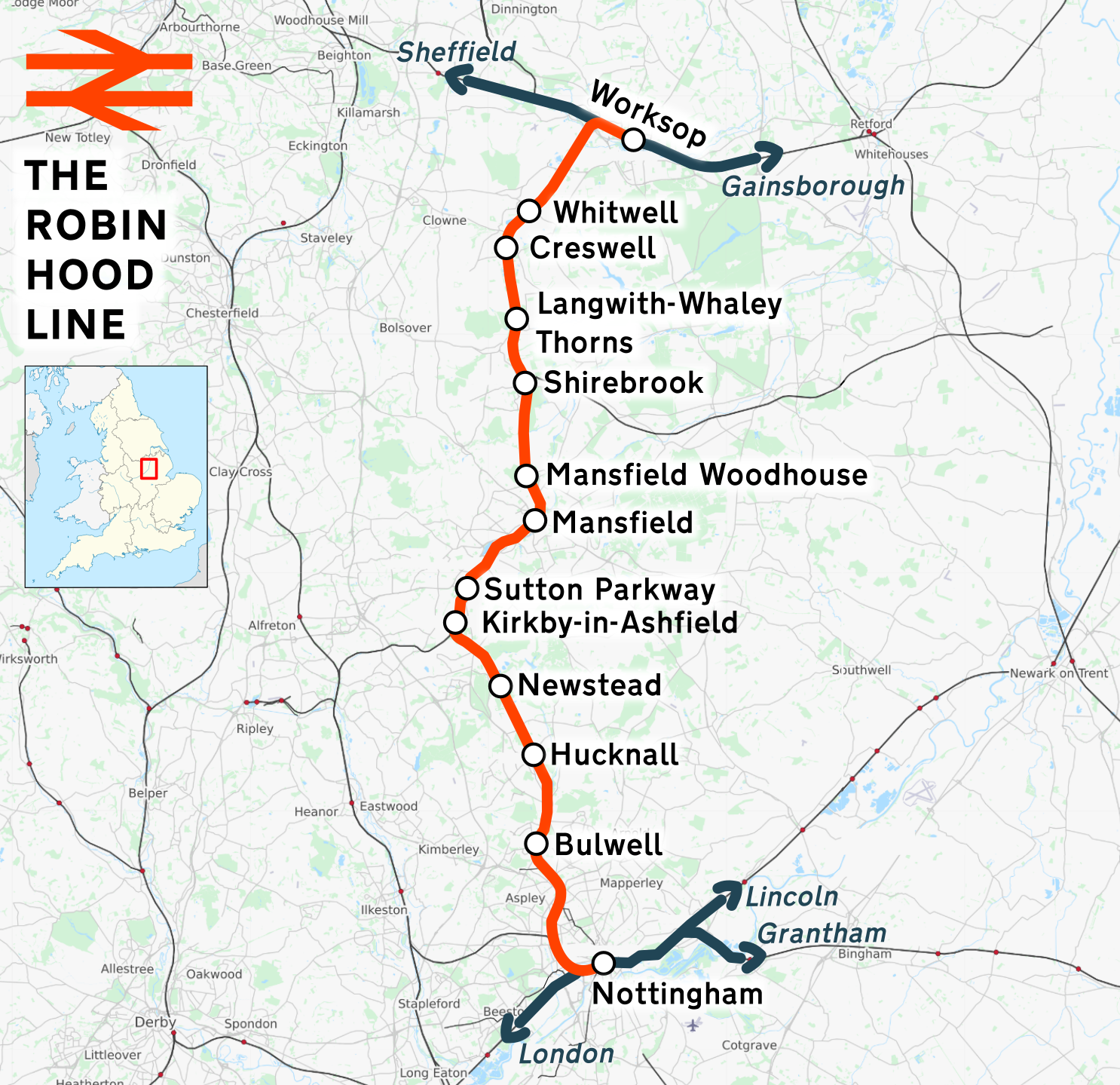
(Click to expand)

The Robin Hood Line is a railway line running from Nottingham to Worksop, Nottinghamshire, in England. The stations between Shirebrook and Whitwell (inclusive) are in the county of Derbyshire.

Passenger services are operated by East Midlands Railway. The line in its present form opened to passengers in stages between 1993 and 1998. Following the Beeching cuts of the 1960s, the line had been freight-only. The cuts had left Mansfield as one of the largest towns in Britain without a railway station.

== History ==
The majority of the current Robin Hood Line re-uses the former Midland Railway (MR) route from Nottingham to Worksop. However, due to rationalisation leading to track removal in order to save the costs of maintaining the tunnel north of Annesley, the through route was severed in the 1970s.

Northwards from Nottingham, the freight-only line remained intact as far as Newstead, where it had served the now closed Newstead Colliery.

Southwards from Worksop, the line followed the old MR route as far as Sutton-in-Ashfield. Between Sutton-in-Ashfield and Kirkby-in-Ashfield, the line was diverted in 1972 to take the former Great Northern Railway (GNR) route through the area. This allowed British Rail to sell land right in the centre of Kirkby-in-Ashfield whilst keeping a freight route through the town. After crossing the town on the GNR route, the line re-joined the old MR route to Pye Bridge, near Ironville but the connection between Kirkby-in-Ashfield and Newstead was closed and the tunnel filled in.

When plans for the Robin Hood Line were drawn up, it was vital in the interest of keeping costs down to make as much use of the existing infrastructure as possible so, rather than trying to buy back the land to rebuild the line through the centre of Kirkby-in-Ashfield, the existing GNR diversion was kept and a new partly single track stretch of railway built to re-create the missing link between Kirkby-in-Ashfield and Newstead.

North of Newstead, at Annesley, both the Great Central Railway (GCR) and the Midland Railway had driven tunnels through the picturesque Robin Hood Hills but, since both lines closed, both tunnels had been filled in. The GCR's tunnel had been at a lower level than the MR's and so was much longer but it had previously been shared with the GNR and the elevation was a good match for the route through Kirkby. In the end it proved cheaper to re-excavate the MR's tunnel, which was found to be in excellent condition and build the new connection on a gradient between the two levels.

The new service from Nottingham to Newstead opened in 1993, although Bulwell station opened only in 1994. It was extended to Mansfield Woodhouse in 1995, with Kirkby-in-Ashfield station opening in 1996. The through passenger route from Nottingham to Worksop opened in 1998.

In 2004 the section between Bulwell and Hucknall was singled to allow space for the new Nottingham Express Transit tramway, which follows the route as far north as Hucknall and opened in March 2004.

== Service ==
As of March 2020, the Robin Hood Line operates a Monday to Saturday service between 05:40 and 22:20. During the day, trains run at hourly intervals between Nottingham and Worksop, the full journey taking 67 minutes.

A Sunday service began on 7 December 2008, with ten trains running between Nottingham and Mansfield Woodhouse between 09:15 and 22:30. Four of those continued to Worksop. The Sunday service was funded by Derbyshire County Council and Nottinghamshire County Council. An understanding was made with the Department for Transport that, if the patronage reached an agreed threshold after two years, it would consider taking over the service and incorporate it within the East Midlands Trains franchise. However, this service was not a commercial success north of Mansfield Woodhouse, and Nottinghamshire County Council decided to reduce its funding and prioritise running a reduced Sunday service from 22 May 2011. The service runs eight times each Sunday between Nottingham and Mansfield Woodhouse and return.

== Proposed extension ==
Just north of Shirebrook station is a junction with a freight branch line that was used for coal traffic to High Marnham power station via Warsop, Edwinstowe and Ollerton. Following closure of the power station the line is disused but has been kept open and fully maintained as a test track for driver training. In mid-2009 Nottinghamshire County Council commissioned a feasibility study to consider a plan to extend the Robin Hood Line along this route by extending the current hourly service between Nottingham and Mansfield Woodhouse to Ollerton, calling at Shirebrook, Warsop and Edwinstowe.

Nottinghamshire CC remained keen on the idea, and met with the rail minister Claire Perry in March 2016 to press for the scheme to be adopted. The new line was anticipated to be 6 miles (9.7 km) long, but as much of it is used for driver training, only about 2 miles (3.2 km) of new track would be required, and the infrastructure is still in good condition. A report produced for Nottinghamshire CC in February 2016 suggested that the likely costs of reinstatement, including the rebuilding of the three stations, would be between £18.9M and £24.5M, with signalling accounting for more than half of that figure. Operating costs were estimated to be some £1.6M per year, with revenue from fares expected to be a little over half of that, and the rest to be found from subsidies. A condition of the awarding of a new East Midlands franchise for operating the line in 2019 was that the operator was required to produce a business case for the extension to Ollerton.

There were also plans to reinstate passenger trains over the freight-only line from Kirkby-in-Ashfield to the closed Pye Bridge railway station on the Erewash Valley line. The Executive Mayor of Mansfield, Tony Egginton, was involved in 2014 East Midlands Councils discussions hypothesising Robin Hood line links to Toton and HS2, and had a further "ambitious vision" of high speed links to Europe via an extended Eurostar service. In late 2016, Nottinghamshire County Council confirmed their backing.

The same line, which has been named the Maid Marian line, has been championed by Ashfield District Council, as it would greatly improve access to the proposed Toton HS2 station for residents in the area. In February 2020, they commissioned a public consultation on the idea, and in November 2020 submitted a bid for the second round of the government's Restoring Your Railway fund, to cover the cost of a feasibility study. The project was one of fifteen schemes which were successful in obtaining such funding.

== Bibliography ==
- David, Gareth (2017). Railway Renaissance: Britain's Railways After Beeching. Pen and Sword Transport. ISBN 978-1-4738-6200-5.
- Hodgson, Neil (11 February 2016). "Possible reopening of the Robin Hood Line to Ollerton". Nottinghamshire County Council. Archived from the original on 24 September 2022.
- Millar, John (15–28 February 1995). Kelly, Peter (ed.). "Robin Hood marches north". RAIL. No. 246. pp. 64–68. ISSN 0953-4563.
- "Robin Hood Line bridges the final 15-mile gap". RAIL. No. 325. EMAP Apex Publications. 25 February – 10 March 1998. p. 10. ISSN 0953-4563. OCLC 49953699.
- Sandeman, Kit (24 February 2020). "Plan to reopen Maid Marian train line takes step forward". Nottingham Post.
