= Mansfield Railway =

Former local railway service around Mansfield, Nottinghamshire

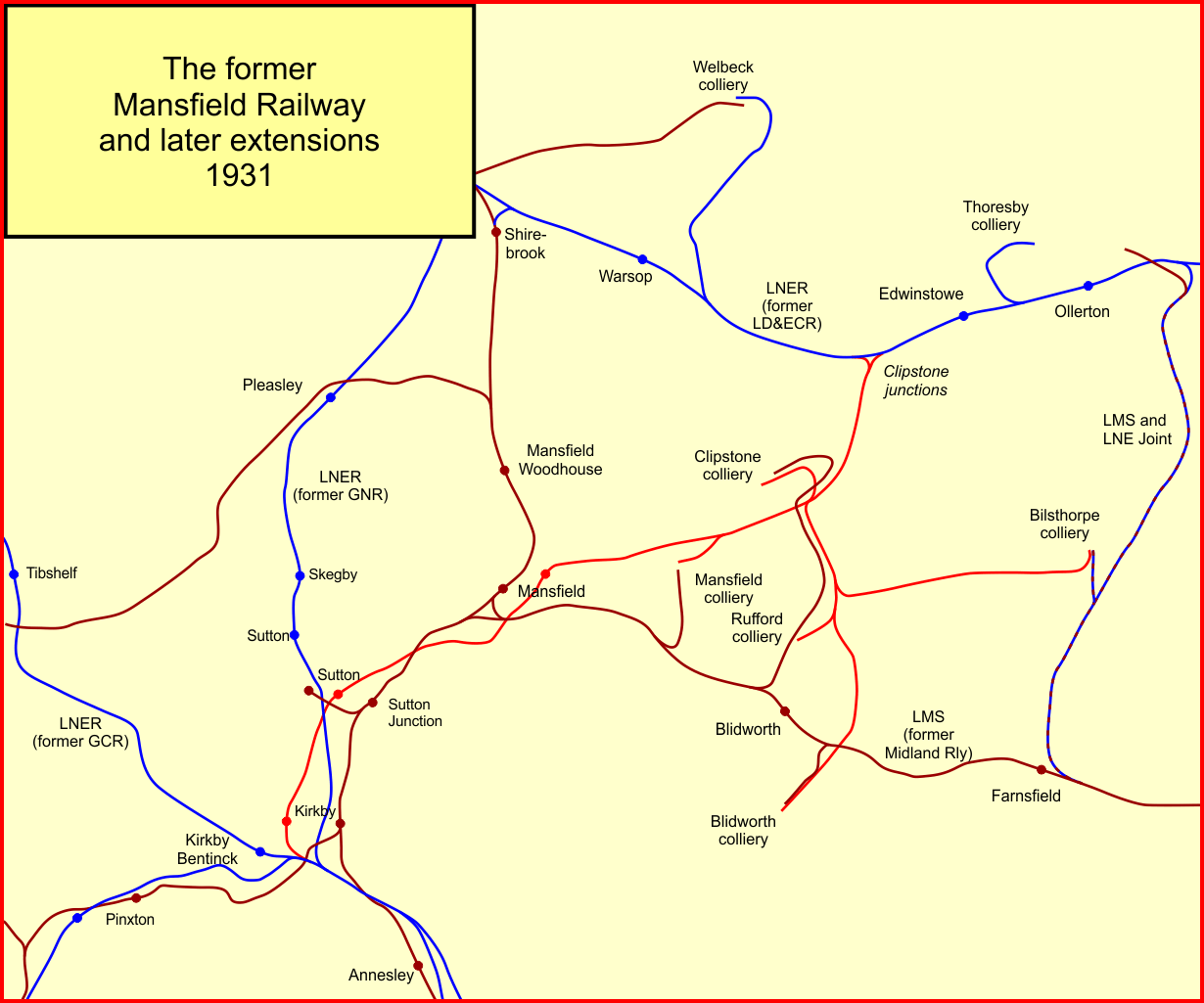
The Mansfield Railway and later connecting lines

The Mansfield Railway was an eleven-mile railway line in Nottinghamshire, England. It was built to serve collieries opening in the coalfield around Mansfield, and ran between junctions at Clipstone and Kirkby-in-Ashfield on the Great Central Railway (GCR). It opened in 1916 and was worked by the GCR. Passenger stations were opened on the line, although, at the date of opening, road bus competition was already dominant.

The passenger service was withdrawn in 1956 and the line closed in stages as collieries ceased work, completely ending operation in 2003.

== Prior railways ==
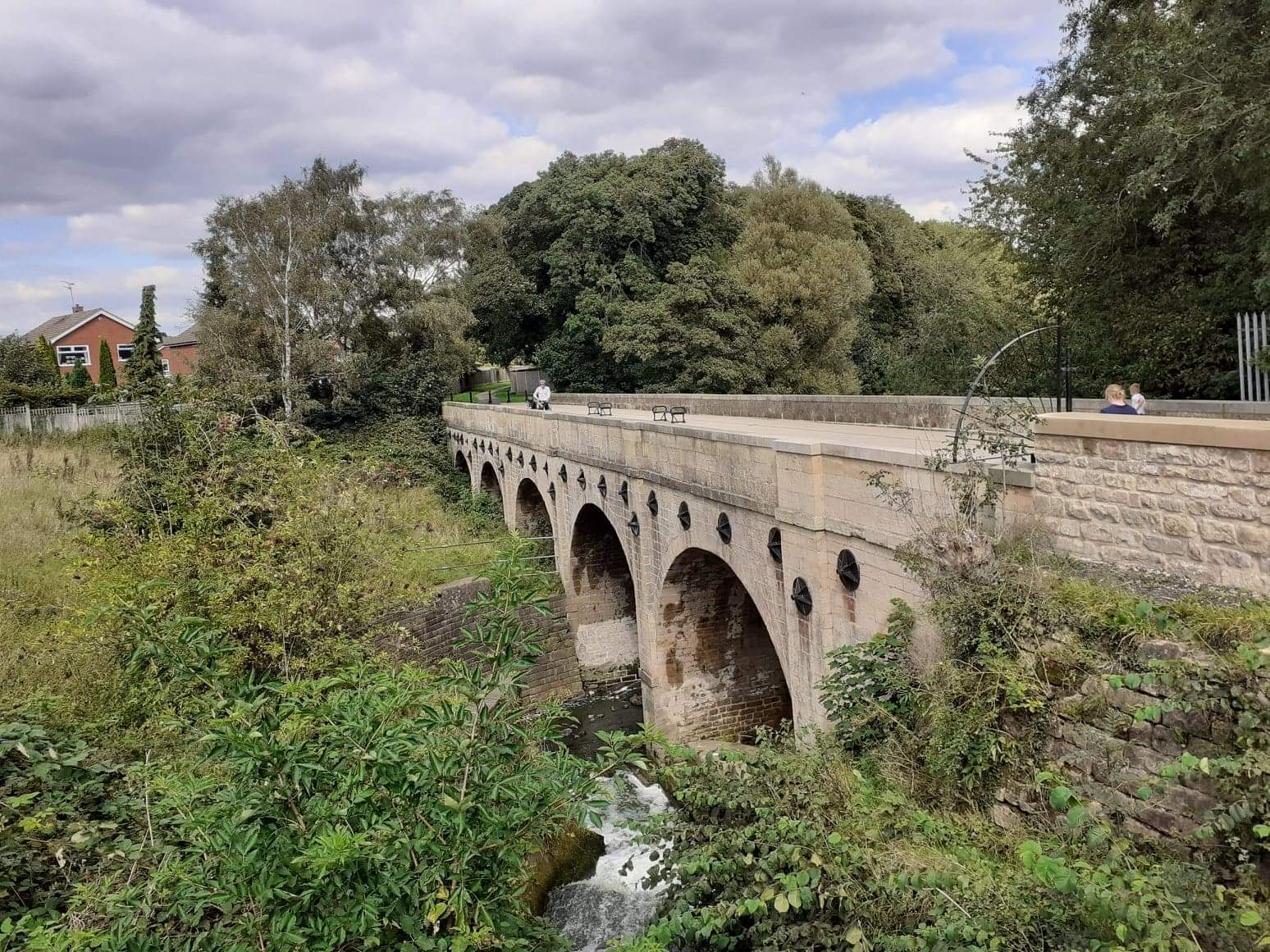
The Mansfield and Pinxton Railway viaduct (a Grade II listed structure) over the River Maun outfall from King's Mill reservoir on Mansfield's outer edge

Railways had existed in the immediate area of Mansfield for many years. The first proper railway had been the Mansfield and Pinxton Railway of 1819, built for the purpose of conveying coal from Pinxton Basin on the Cromford Canal. It was a horse-drawn edge railway.

The Midland Railway established a presence in Mansfield in 1849. The Midland company was widely believed to exploit its monopoly position in setting mineral traffic rates beyond what was reasonable, and considerable hostility developed on the part of coal-owners.

The Lancashire, Derbyshire and East Coast Railway (LD&ECR) obtained authorisation for a branch line to Mansfield, but the LD&ECR was perpetually in financial difficulty and abandoned the plan. In 1907 it was absorbed by the Great Central Railway but attempts to persuade the GCR and the Great Northern Railway at different times to build a line to, or through Mansfield met with failure.

In the early years of the twentieth century the coalfield was being developed and new pits with considerable promised output were being made ready. Local coal-owners decided the only course was to build a railway themselves.

== Mansfield colliery ==
The Mansfield colliery (Crown Farm) of the Bolsover Colliery Company was producing 1.2 million tons annually at the time of building of the line. Rufford colliery (at Rainworth) was producing 750,000 tons.

== Mansfield Railway opening ==
Mansfield Railway Act 1910
- Act of Parliament
- Parliament of the United Kingdom
- Long title: An Act for incorporating the Mansfield Railway Company and authorising them to construct railways in the county of Nottingham and for other purposes.
- Citation: 10 Edw. 7 & 1 Geo. 5. c. xli

Dates
- Royal assent: 26 July 1910

Text of statute as originally enacted

The result was the promotion of the Mansfield Railway, led by the Duke of Portland, who owned considerable coal-bearing estates in the district. Parliament authorised the route in the Mansfield Railway Act 1910 (10 Edw. 7 & 1 Geo. 5. c. xli) on 26 July 1910: it was to run from a junction with the Great Central Railway at Clipstone to another junction with the same company at Kirkby in Ashfield. The Great Central Railway agreed to work and maintain the line for 60% of gross receipts, on condition that it would have exclusive use of the line; this was ratified by an agreement of 28 October 1910. Construction began in 1911, between Mansfield Colliery and a junction with the LD&ECR at Clipstone. The first coal train left Mansfield for Immingham on 6 June 1913, and regular mineral traffic began ten days later.

The line was extended through Mansfield to a large goods depot constructed on the approach to Nottingham Road: the extension opened on 2 June 1914. A further act was obtained on 8 July 1914, authorising a west curve at Clipstone, as well as short branches to Clipstone and Rufford collieries. The Clipstone Colliery branch was opened on 13 June 1916, together with a half-mile spur to Clipstone Camp, an army depot. The Camp branch was built by the War Office; there was a platform for embarking troops, horses and stores. A passenger service operated between the camp and Mansfield. The Clipstone Camp branch was taken over by the Great Central Railway on 17 December 1917; it shared part of the route of the line to Clipstone Colliery. The GCR had begun operating the passenger service on 1 October 1917, but it was discontinued on 10 July 1920.

The remainder of the main line, from Mansfield to Kirkby South Junction, opened for goods on 4 September 1916. Clipstone west curve opened on 18 March 1918; a branch to Rufford Colliery, two miles in length, opened on 8 July 1918.

The route of the line posed engineering difficulties, due to difficult ground conditions and also the necessity of building through the expanding built-up area of Mansfield.

== In operation ==
Sidings at Clipstone were used to assemble coal trains for onward movement over the LD&ECR; coal trains from collieries to that location formed a heavy traffic on the line. Through trains conveying fish from Grimsby and steel from Scunthorpe were also prominent. The goods yard facilities at Mansfield were on a very large scale, occupying a broad swathe of land between Nottingham Road and Littleworth. Regular passenger services over the Mansfield Railway commenced seven months after the line had been completed: the first train from Nottingham to Ollerton via Mansfield ran on 2 April 1917. The area was already well provided with stations on the nearby Great Northern and Midland routes, and road bus competition was already making itself felt. There were three trains each way, and all of them made London Marylebone connections at Nottingham Victoria. Stations were built at Kirkby in Ashfield, Sutton in Ashfield and Mansfield Central, although the word Central never appeared on its nameboards.

== Grouping of the railways ==
In 1923 most of the main line railways of Great Britain were compulsorily reorganised into one or other of four new large companies, in a process known as the "grouping", mandated by the Railways Act 1921. The Mansfield Railway was absorbed by the new London and North Eastern Railway (LNER), and the Great Central Railway was a constituent of the LNER. The neighbouring Midland Railway was a constituent of the new London, Midland and Scottish Railway (LMS).

== New colliery lines ==
The development of the collieries in the district continued after 1923 and several new colliery connections were made. As the former Mansfield Railway (now LNER) and the former Midland Railway (now LMS) lines were close together here, but still in competitive ownership. Both companies wanted to make the connections, and collaborated in making some of them jointly as far as possible. Such a line was made to Bilsthorpe Colliery in 1928. The LMS got access to an area that was within the LNER area of influence, and the LMS may have benefitted far more from the construction. Mansfield had concentration sidings where coal wagons were formed into trains for the transit to Immingham and elsewhere; in 1927 they were considered to be overwhelmed and an additional reception road and fifteen new sidings were sanctioned, as well as new coaling and watering facilities.

== Trains and depots ==
Mansfield Central had fourteen passenger trains a day to Nottingham Victoria, and twelve return, in 1939, with extra trains on Saturdays. A Leeds–Bournemouth express was also routed this way during the 1930s. In the autumn of 1955 there were eight northbound and seven southbound passenger trains over the Mansfield Railway, but they had become increasingly loss-making and the decision was taken to withdraw them, on 2 January 1956. Kirkby and Sutton goods yards were to close at the same time. Scheduled summer Saturday holiday trains continued until 8 September 1956, and seasonal excursions to east coast resorts continued for several years. Nevertheless Mansfield goods depot closed on 13 June 1966 and the line south of Crown Farm Colliery (two miles east of Mansfield) closed on 7 January 1968. Virtually all traces of the route through Mansfield were eradicated in the 1970s. Crown Farm Colliery closed in March 1988, and Bilsthorpe in March 1997. Clipstone Colliery closed in 2003.

== Stations ==
Three stations were built on the line: Mansfield, Sutton-in-Ashfield and Kirkby-in-Ashfield. They all had "Central" added informally, to reduce confusion with neighbouring stations, though the word "Central" never appeared on station nameboards. A passenger service of three trains per day, calling at all stations between Nottingham Victoria and Ollerton began on 2 April 1917. By 1939 this had expanded to 14 trains per day between Nottingham Victoria and Mansfield Central, with some going on to Ollerton. There was even a Sunday service of four trains per day. By the time passenger services were withdrawn on 2 January 1956 the service had been reduced to seven trains per day between Nottingham Victoria to Mansfield Central, four of which went on to Edwinstowe.

Stations reopened for Summer weekend excursion traffic to Scarborough, Cleethorpes, Skegness and Mablethorpe for several more years.

== After 1960 ==
Long distance freight used the line into the 1960s, notably a Grimsby to Whitland express fish train.

Coal traffic remained the mainstay. Mansfield Concentration Sidings ("Con", locally) handled and distributed countless wagons of coal to all parts over the years.

The line South of Crown Farm Colliery, Mansfield closed on 7 January 1968. Mansfield Central Station and associated earthworks in Mansfield were removed in 1972.

The last use of any part of the line appears to have been in 2003.
