= Clipstone railway station =

Former railway station in Nottinghamshire, England

Coordinates: 53.15425°N 1.11858°W

General information
- Location: Clipstone, Nottinghamshire; England
- Platforms: N\A

Other information
- Status: Disused

History
- Original company: Lancashire, Derbyshire and East Coast Railway
- Pre-grouping: Great Central Railway
- Post-grouping: London and North Eastern Railway; British Railways

Key dates
- 1912: Opened to colliery workmen's trains
- 1914: Service suspended
- 1920: re-opened to colliery workmen's trains
- 1922: First coal trains
- 30 April 1993: Service suspended
- 24 January 1994: Officially closed to both freight traffic and colliery workers' trains
- 17 April 2003: Closed completely and at least partly demolished
Location

Clipstone Colliery Sidings railway station was a station in Clipstone, Nottinghamshire.

While primarily a goods station, there was an unadvertised halt used by workmen. It was on the former Lancashire, Derbyshire and East Coast Railway line and is listed in Butt as Clipstone Colliery Sidings.

A large concentration of sidings around Kings Clipstone and the worker's halt at New Clipstone village both served the Clipstone, Mansfield, Thoresby, Ollerton, Welbeck and Rainworth collieries for several decades.

Clipstone Sidings signalbox was existent on 21 October 1950 and was near Clipstone West Junction, heading towards Welbeck Junction.

Clipstone East signalbox was existent in the 1960s on the 'main-line' between Welbeck Junction and Thoresby Junction.

The Midland Loaded Sidings of Clipstone Colliery were still in regular use on 23 June 1972

Both Clipstone West junction and Clipstone colliery Junction and closed on 14 July 1986.

The pit closed in April 2003.

Clipstone Sidings signalbox, Clipstone West Junction and Welbeck Junction no longer exist

Former Services

Preceding station	Disused railways	Following station
Warsop	British Railways; LD&ECR	Edwinstowe
Warsop	British Railways; LD&ECR	Mansfield Central
