= Vicar Water =

River in Nottinghamshire, England

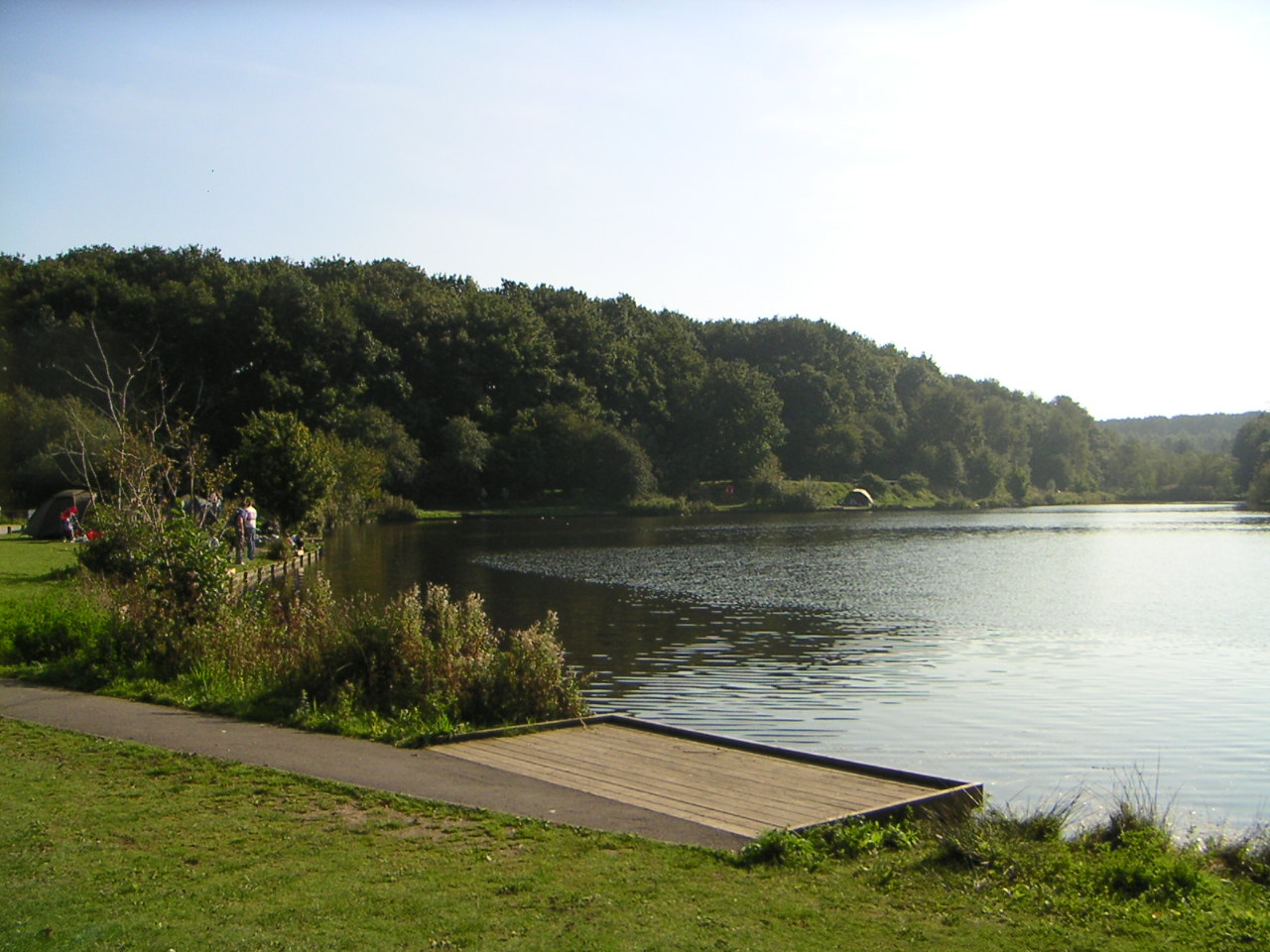
- Vicar Pond, which is fed by Vicar Water

Location
- Country: England
- County: Nottinghamshire

Physical characteristics
- Source
  - location: Clipstone Country Park
- Mouth: River Maun
  - location: Clipstone

Vicar Water is a small river in Nottinghamshire, England. It is a tributary of the River Maun, and runs through an area which was once the royal hunting ground of Clipstone Park. It gained its present name in the early nineteenth century, and was dammed in 1870, in order to make a trout fishery, which was used to stock the lakes at nearby Welbeck Abbey. Since the cessation of coal mining, much of it has been incorporated into a country park, and is a designated Local Nature Reserve.

== History ==
The river joins the River Maun near Clipstone where there is a hunting lodge, built in 1164 and known to have been used by King John. The ruins are grade II-listed and a scheduled ancient monument. The name of the river was Warmebroke at the time, and it was not called Vicar Water until the early nineteenth century. In the seventeenth century, large tracts of land were given to the Duke of Newcastle and the Duke of Portland, and the river and its surroundings became part of the estate of the Duke of Portland. The 5th Duke of Portland constructed a dam across the river in the 1870s, to impound the water and create a lake. This was used as a trout fishery, from which the lakes at Welbeck Abbey were stocked. Records show that 600 fish were transferred for this purpose in 1873.

Thirty years later, the pool was a popular location for swimming and boating. It continued to be so during the First World War, when it was used by some of the 20,000 soldiers stationed nearby, and after the opening of Clipstone Colliery in 1922, numbers using the facilities were swelled by some of the 2,000 residents who moved into the purpose-built village of New Clipstone. Fishing also became popular, with the Duke awarding the fishing rights to the Clipstone Colliery Angling Club. Spoil tips from the mine gradually surrounded the lake and river, until tipping ceased in 1976. Nottinghamshire County Council then initiated a reclamation scheme, to transform the area into a country park. 25 acres (10 ha) of woodland were planted, and the park opened in 1982. Ten years later, ownership was transferred to the Newark and Sherwood District Council, and improvements were made using grants from Nottinghamshire County Council and the European Regional Development Fund. A part-time ranger was employed to manage the site in 1993, and this became a permanent post in 1999, when funding was received from the owners of Clipstone Colliery, RJB Mining.

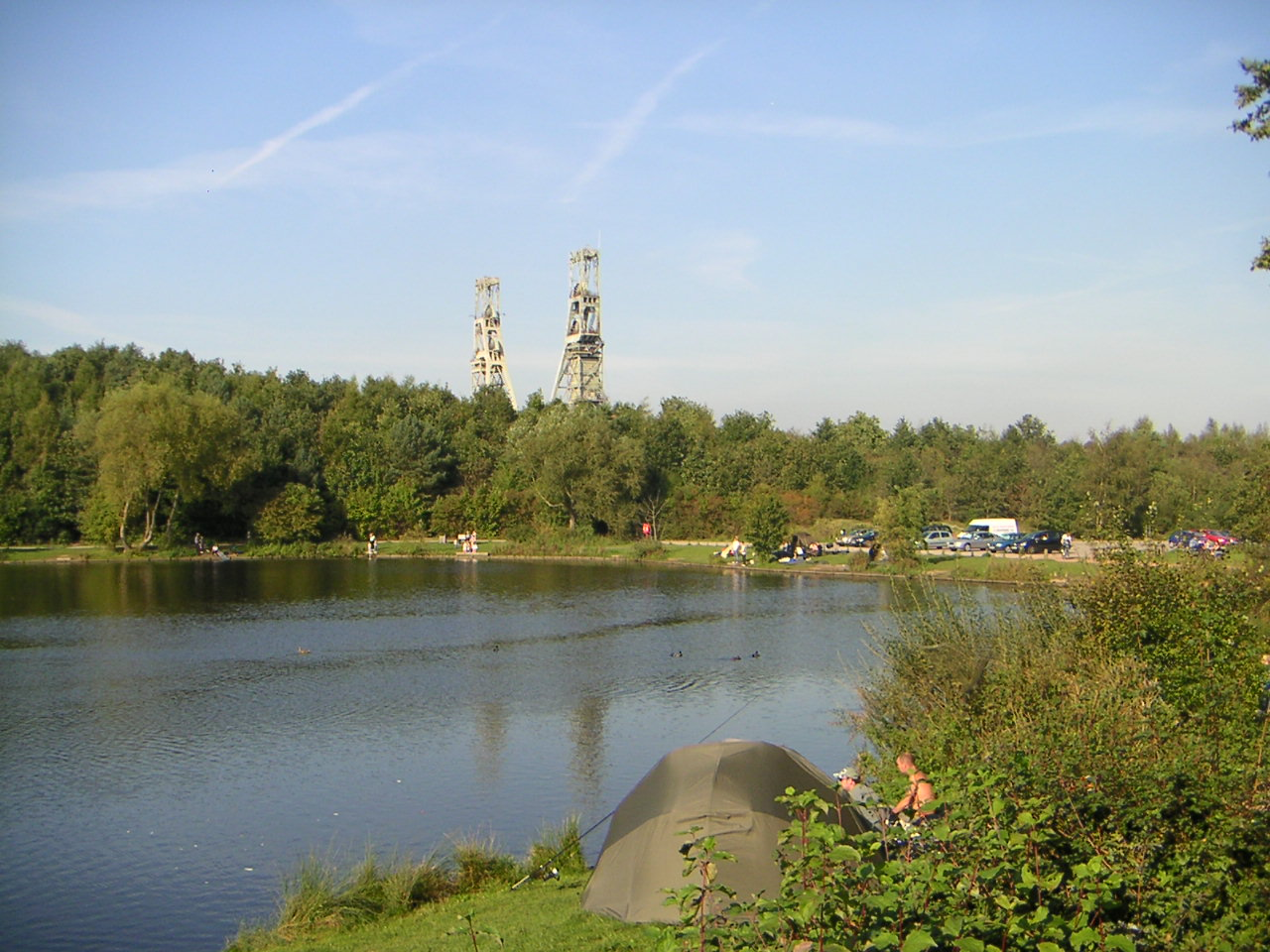
View towards the car parking area with Clipstone Colliery headstocks in background

Vicar water may have a bus service calling at the park in the future and a bus terminus.

== Course ==
The river starts at a series of small lakes, at the western edge of the country park. They occupy the site of a larger artificial lake, marked on the 1885 map as having three sluices into the main channel. The river used to start before the lake, but this area has been affected by railway construction, and a large settling pond was built as part of the mine workings, where the stream once was. The river continues along the southern edge of Clipstone and the northern edge of the country park, to reach the V-shaped Vicar Pond, which is now a coarse fishery. Below the pond, the course is crossed by several redundant railway bridges, once associated with the colliery, and the National Cycle Network Route 6 runs parallel to it. It runs northwards at this point, to reach King's Clipstone, and the remains of the hunting lodge, to pass under the B6030 Mansfield Road, and join the River Maun.

== Water Quality ==
The Environment Agency measure water quality of the river systems in England. Each is given an overall ecological status, which may be one of five levels: high, good, moderate, poor and bad. There are several components that are used to determine this, including biological status, which looks at the quantity and varieties of invertebrates, angiosperms and fish. Chemical status, which compares the concentrations of various chemicals against known safe concentrations, is rated good or fail.

The water quality of Vicar Water was as follows in 2019.

Section	Ecological Status	Chemical Status	Length	Catchment
Vicar Water from Source to Maun	Poor	Fail	2.8 miles (4.5 km)	6.10 square miles (15.8 km^{2})

Reasons for the ecological status being less than good include discharge from sewage treatment works, and the volumes of surface water and groundwater which are abstracted from the catchment. Like most rivers in the UK, the chemical status changed from good to fail in 2019, due to the presence of polybrominated diphenyl ethers (PBDE) and mercury compounds, neither of which had previously been included in the assessment.

== Points of interest ==
Point	Coordinates (Links to map resources)	OS Grid Ref	Notes
Jn with River Maun	53.1799°N 1.0973°W	SK604651	mouth
B6030 Mansfield Road bridge	53.1783°N 1.0953°W	SK605649	
Baulker Lane bridge	53.1648°N 1.1026°W	SK600634	
Vicar Pond	53.1598°N 1.1114°W	SK595628	
Pond at source	53.1545°N 1.1354°W	SK579622	
