= Kirkby-in-Ashfield Central railway station =

Former railway station in Nottinghamshire, England

Kirkby-in-Ashfield Central
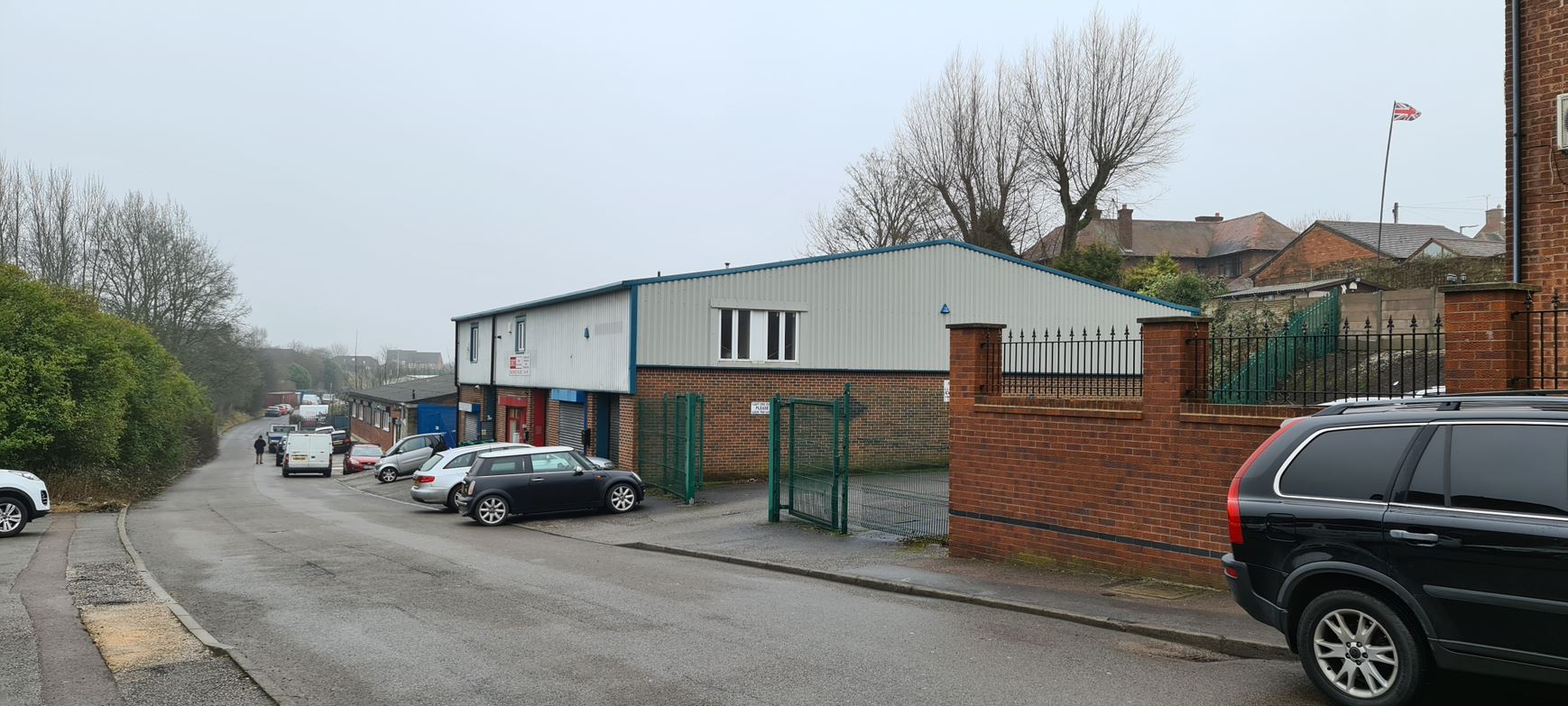
- Modern industrial units along alignment of former rail tracks

General information
- Location: Kirkby-in-Ashfield, Ashfield; England
- Coordinates: 53.1003°N 1.2629°W
- Grid reference: SK494561
- Platforms: 2

Other information
- Status: Disused

History
- Original company: Mansfield Railway
- Pre-grouping: Mansfield Railway
- Post-grouping: LNER; British Railways

Key dates
- 2 April 1917: Opened
- 6 January 1956: Closed to timetabled passenger traffic and to goods
- 8 September 1956: Closed to timetabled summer Saturday holiday trains
- September 1962: Seasonal excursions ended
- 7 January 1968: Line through station closed
Location

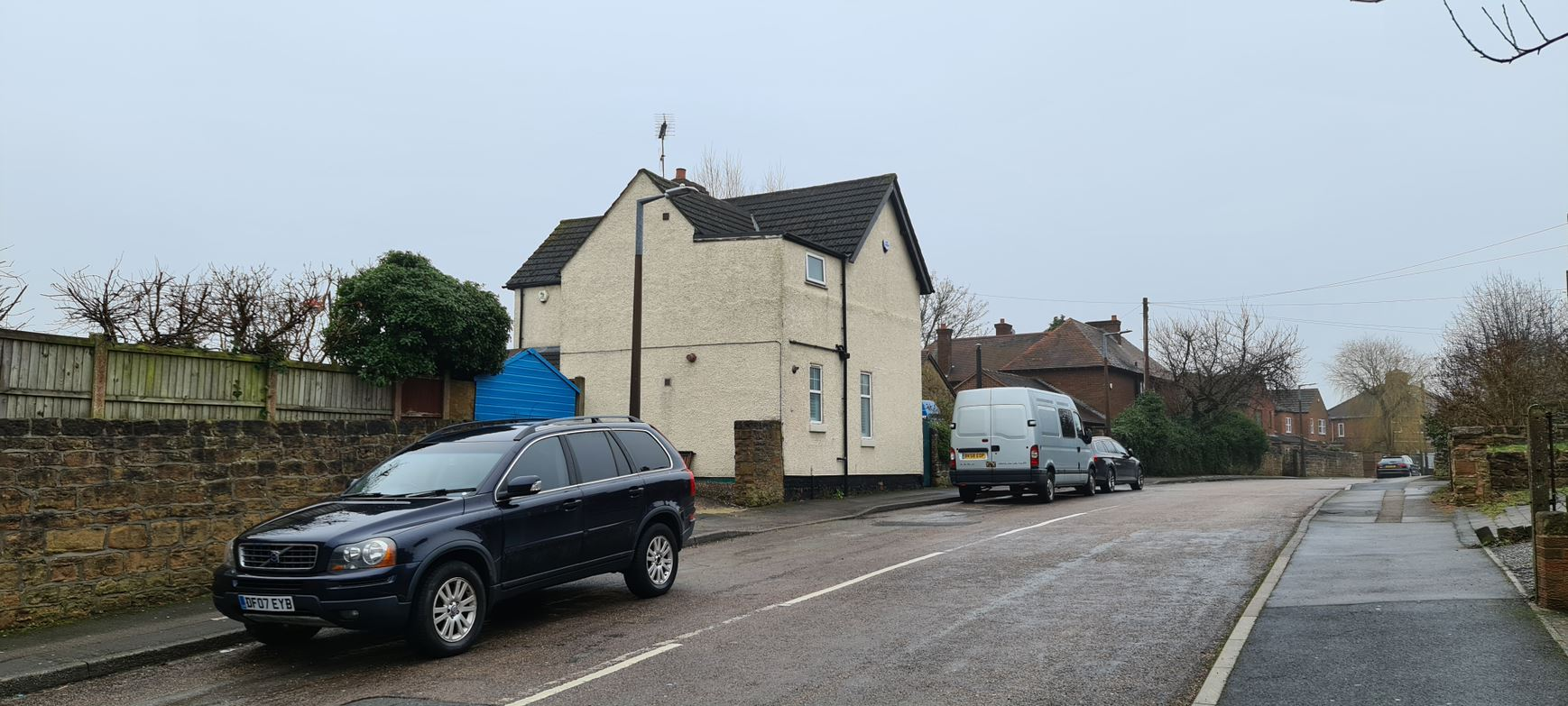
The former Station Master's house

Kirkby-in-Ashfield Central is a former railway station that served the town of Kirkby-in-Ashfield, Nottinghamshire.

== History ==
The station was opened in 1917 by the Mansfield Railway along with Mansfield Central and Sutton-in-Ashfield Central. The line, including its stations, was worked by the Great Central Railway and became part of the LNER in 1923 and subsequently British Railways in 1948.

The station was conventional and spacious.

Most passenger services plied between Nottingham Victoria and Mansfield Central, with some extending to Edwinstowe and Ollerton.

Goods and timetabled passenger services ceased on 3 January 1956, though Summer weekend excursion traffic to Scarborough, Cleethorpes, Skegness and Mablethorpe continued until 1962.

The line through the station was closed on 7 January 1968 and subsequently lifted.

Preceding station	Disused railways	Following station
Sutton-in-Ashfield Central	Great Central Railway; Mansfield Railway	Hollin Well and Annesley
