= Kings Mill Reservoir =

Reservoir in Nottinghamshire, England

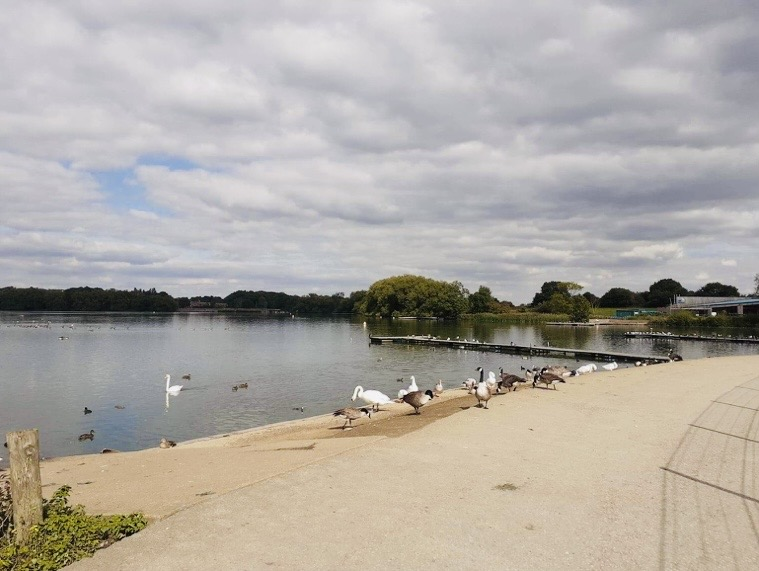
- The reservoir

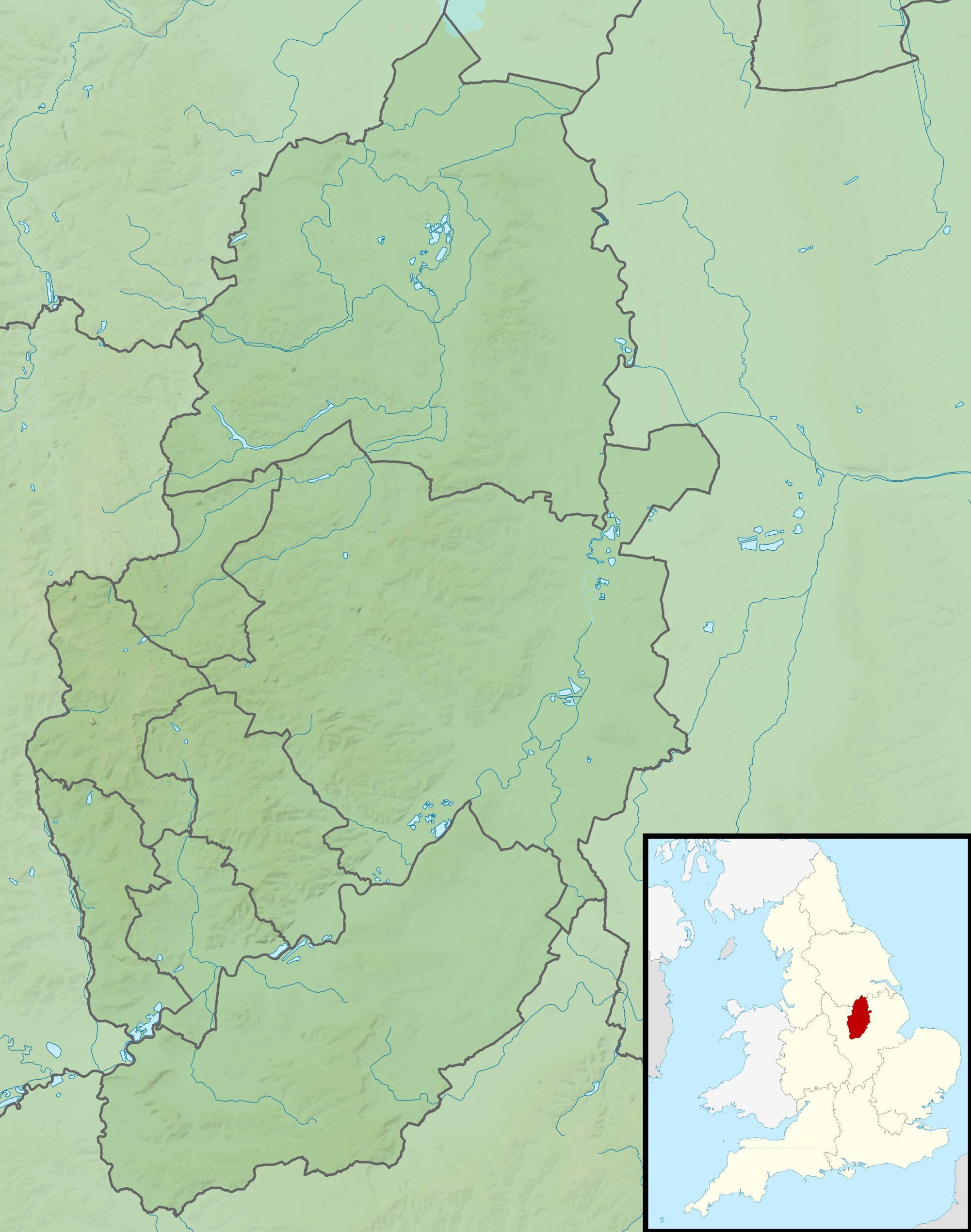
- Location within Nottinghamshire Location within England
- Location: Sherwood Way South, Sutton-in-Ashfield, NG17 4PA
- Coordinates: 53°7′53″N 1°13′50″W
- Type: Reservoir
- River sources: River Maun
- Basin countries: United Kingdom
- Managing agency: Ashfield District Council
- Built: 1839
- Website: Mill Waters

Kings Mill Reservoir is situated in Sutton-in-Ashfield, in the Ashfield District of Nottinghamshire, close to the boundary of Mansfield, and adjacent to Kings Mill Hospital. It forms part of the Maun from Source to Vicar Water water body.

== History ==
Kings Mill Reservoir, also known as Mill Waters, used to be part of the Welbeck Estate owned by the William Bentinck, 4th Duke of Portland, former Member of Parliament for Petersfield. The reservoir was created in 1839 after the Duke in 1837 commissioned the flooding of 72 acres of farmland and the ancient mill pond, with the aim of supplying water to the mills along the River Maun. An early record of the mill at Kings Mill can be seen in Domesday Book dating to 1086.

In the time of Henry II of England, the King visited what is now known as Kings Mill, staying at the home of Sir John Cockle for a night having been hunting in Sherwood Forest. Sir John Cockle was later known as the Miller of Mansfield.

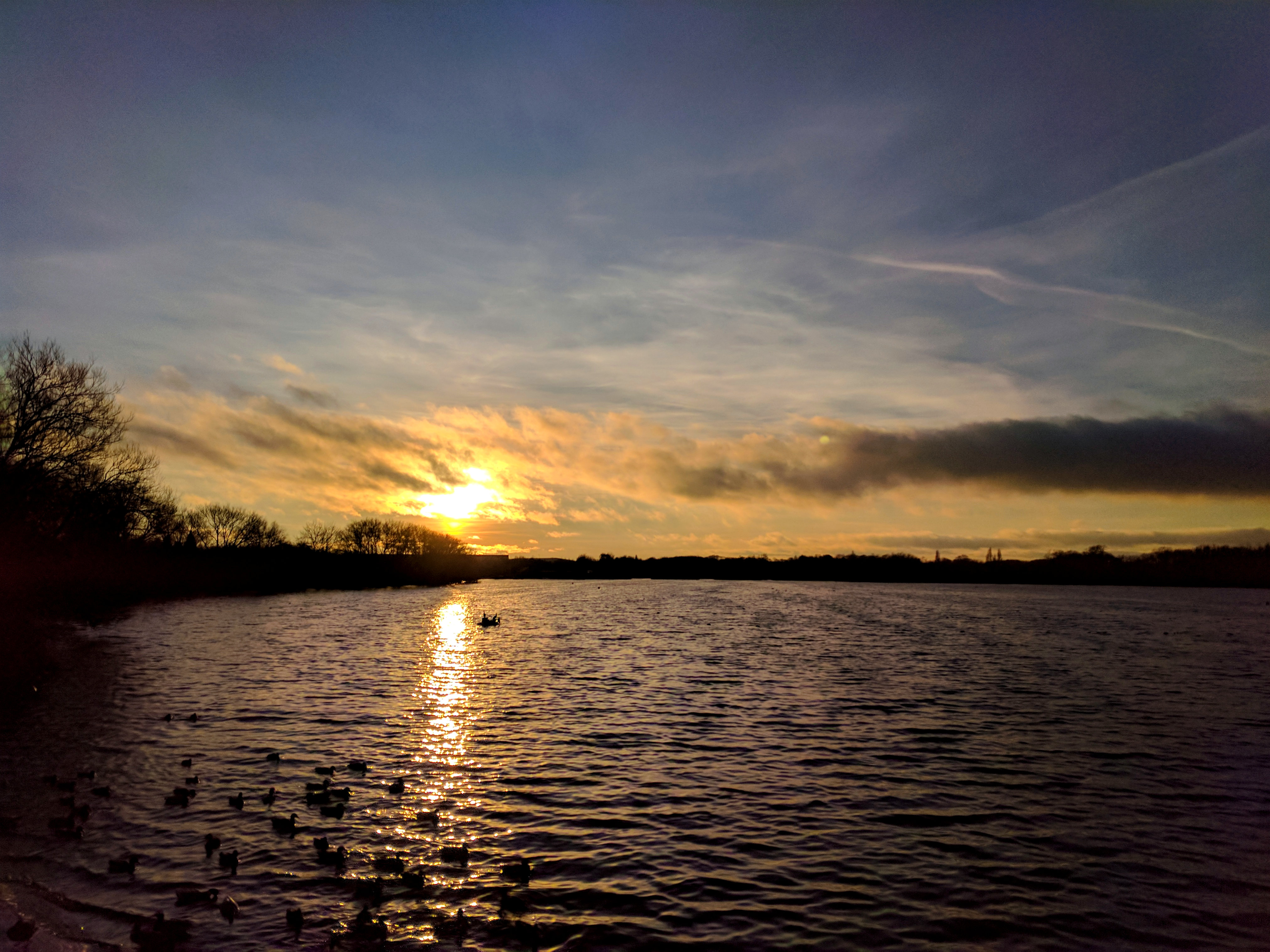
The reservoir at dusk

== The Mill Adventure Base ==
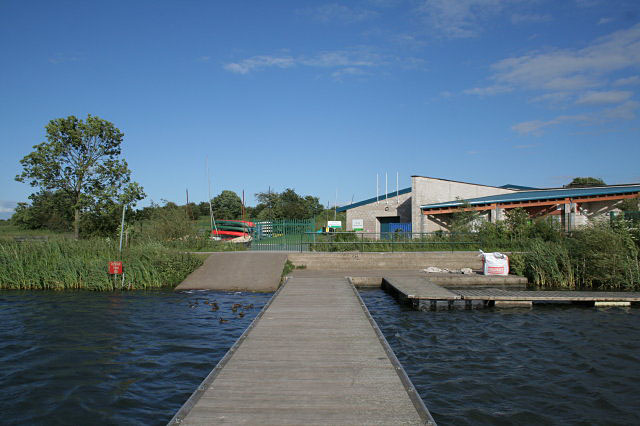
The Adventure Centre from the reservoir

The Mill Adventure Base at Kings Mill Reservoir is a purpose-built adventure centre designed to provide activities to young people of Nottinghamshire. Young people are able to stay in the camping pods or the tented village on site.

Some of the activities include archery, canoeing, high ropes, mountain biking, an outdoor climbing tower, raft building, zip wire and shelter building. The centre is run by Nottinghamshire County Council and also includes other sites Bestwood Environmental Education Centre and Hagg Farm Outdoor Education Centre in the Peak District. An open water swimming group have also operated from the base.

== Amenities ==
There is the Mill Waters cafe close to the Mill Adventure Centre.

== The Hermitage local nature reserve ==
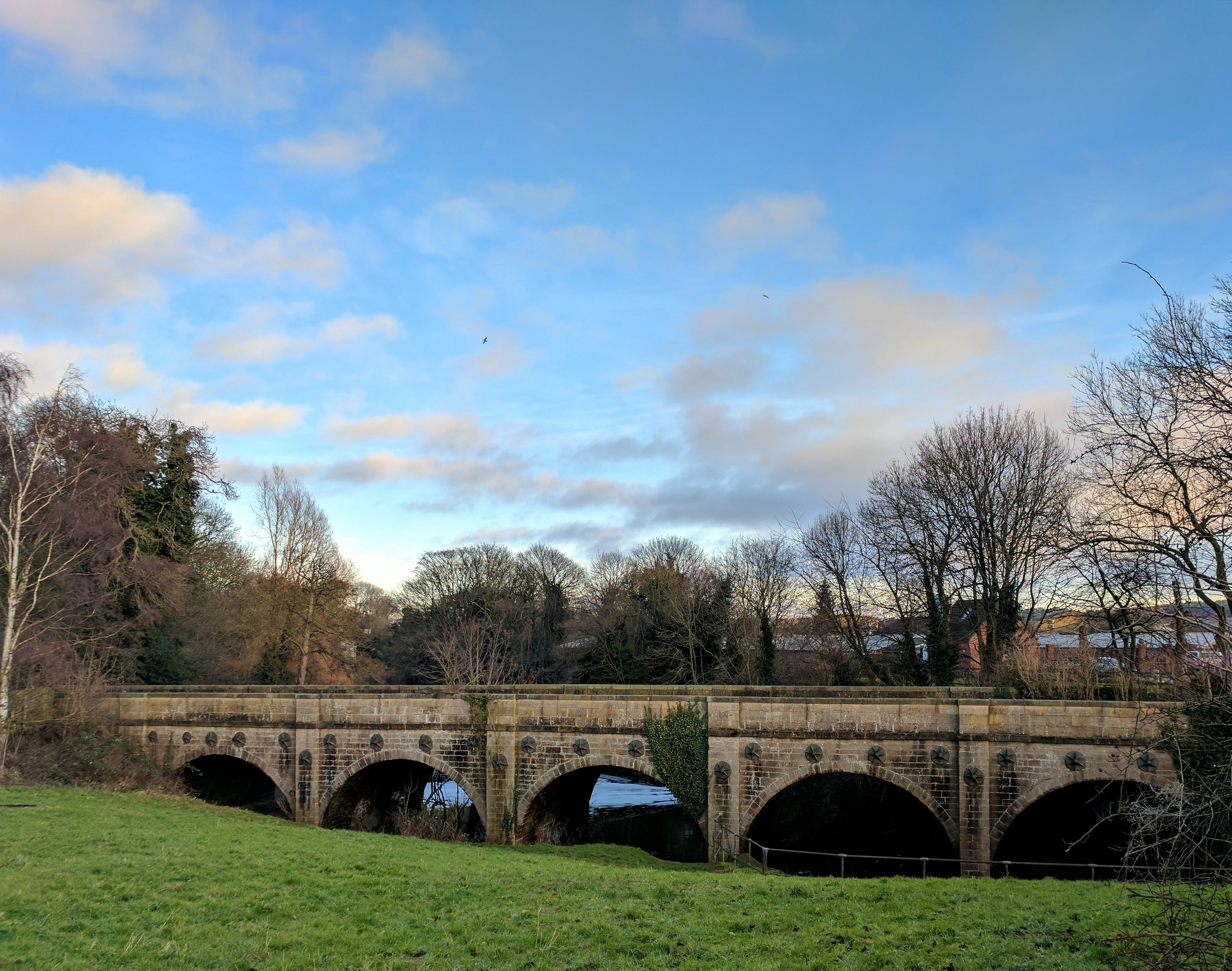
The Mansfield and Pinxton Railway viaduct over the River Maun outfall from the mill-pond originally powering the old Kings Mill, looking towards Mansfield

Situated directly downstream on the reservoir's outfall beneath the site of the old Kings Mill and overlooked by Kings Mill Viaduct, a listed structure and part of the historic Mansfield and Pinxton Railway, the reserve lies alongside a small section of the next mill pond along the route, originally powering Hermitage Mill.

The small wildlife haven was established on land bequeathed by former solicitor Col. J.N. Vallance, who lived at nearby Hermitage House, for the use and good of the local people. 46 species of birds have been recorded, including at an established Heronry. Several more local reserves provide a green wildlife corridor along the River Maun.

Owned by Mansfield District Council since 1986 and given Local Nature Reserve status in 2004, it has been closed-off to public since early December 2024, due to hazardous conditions including poor walkways and diseased trees. As of February 2026, the council had submitted a planning application to fell some trees protected by a Tree Preservation Order (TPO) and commissioned a specialist's report.

== Former sailing club ==
Sutton-in-Ashfield Sailing Club was for 63 years situated at the reservoir on land leased from Ashfield District Council, initially at a peppercorn rent of £75, with the club's 2018-19 lease expired in October 2019 costing £1,100.

Starting in 2020, the council wanted to halve the storage area used for small dingies and submitted a planning application to turn some land into a new facility including a chargeable public car park, prompting a club spokesperson to comment "We believe in the long term the council wants to get rid of us to introduce a commercial venture here of some type". New conditions were imposed including increased charges of £3,000 per annum, which the club, as a volunteer-run, non-profit organisation with a history of providing free and low cost sailing, decided was not feasible.

Using government monies allocated via the Towns Fund, the council developed a new facility intended to provide potential for greater public participation across a wider range of water-based activities. After delays following building-completion, an operator, who will "invest £316,000 over five years", was appointed in late 2025.
