= King's Mill Hospital =

Coordinates: 53°08′07″N 1°14′03″W

Kings Mill Hospital
- Sherwood Forest Hospitals NHS Foundation Trust
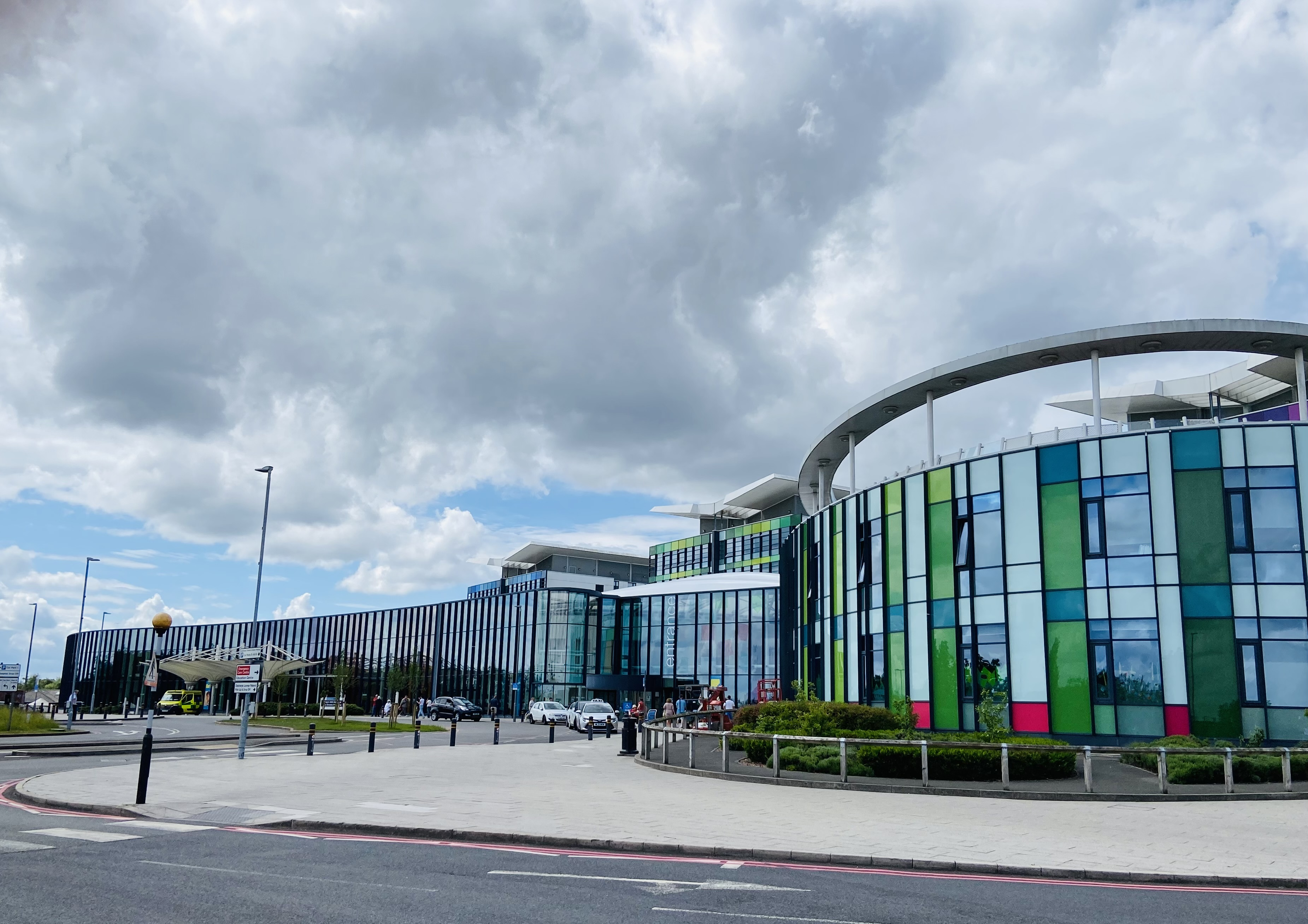
- The front entrance

- Shown in Nottinghamshire

Geography
- Location: Mansfield Road, Sutton-In-Ashfield, Nottinghamshire, NG17 4JL

Organisation
- Care system: NHS England
- Type: Teaching
- Affiliated university: University of Nottingham

Services
- Emergency department: Yes
- Beds: 600

Helipads
- Helipad: Yes

History
- Founded: 1942

Links
- Website: King's Mill Hospital

King's Mill Hospital is an acute district general hospital serving the population of north Nottinghamshire and parts of Derbyshire and Lincolnshire. It is managed by the Sherwood Forest Hospitals NHS Foundation Trust. The hospital is in Sutton-in-Ashfield.

== History ==
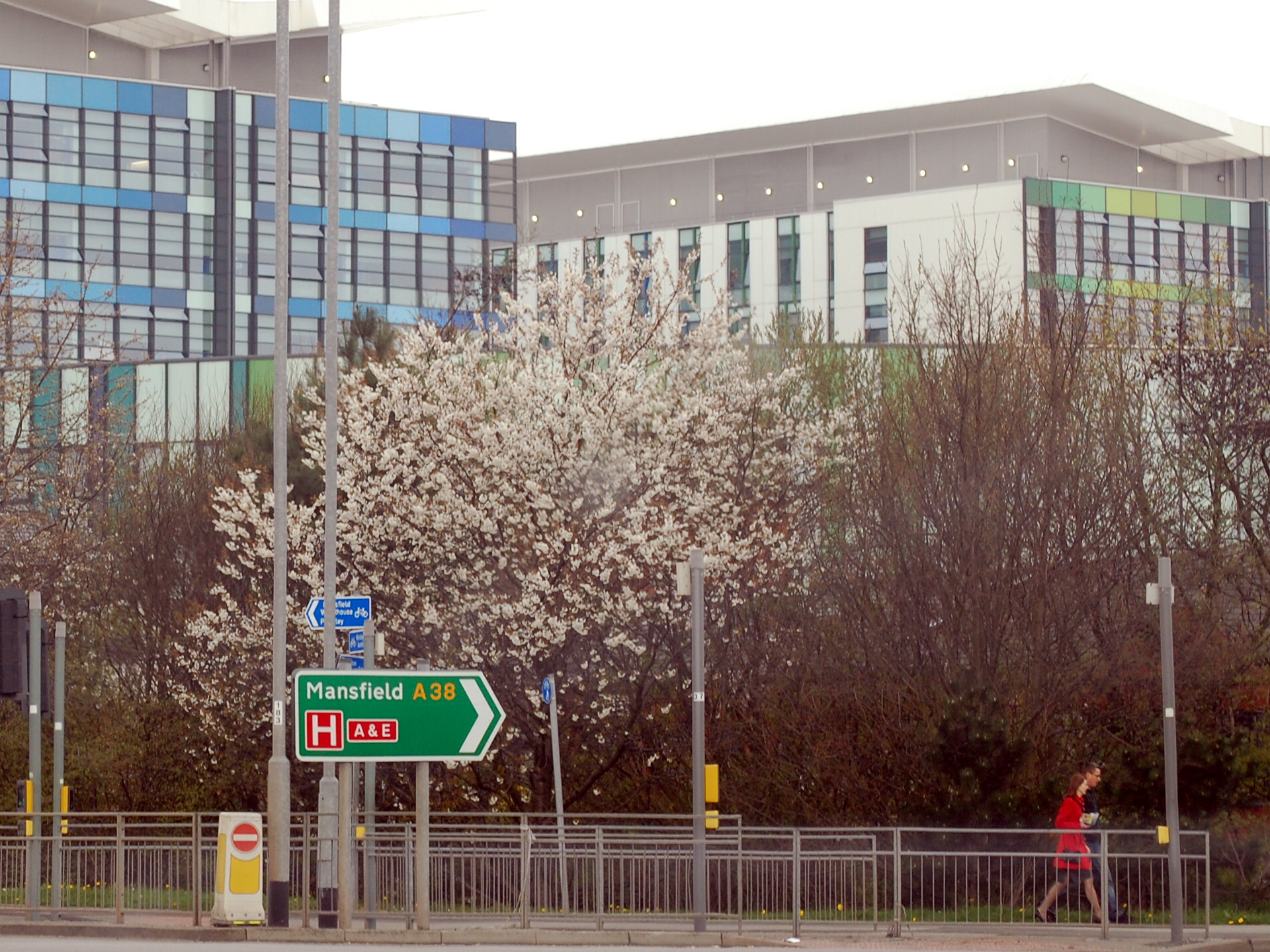
King's Mill Hospital from the A38/A617/MARR road junction

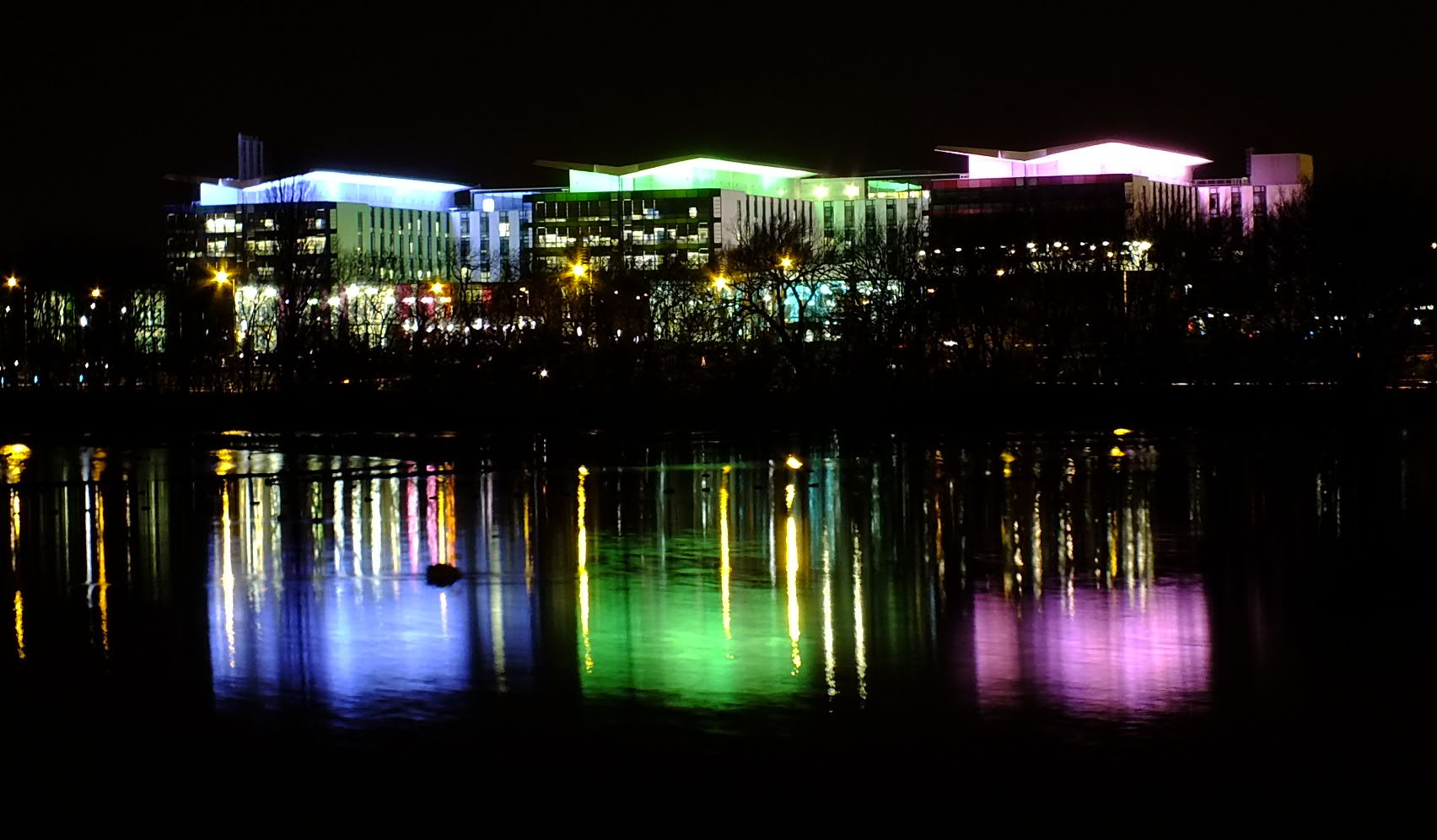
King's Mill Hospital with King's Mill Reservoir in the foreground

King's Mill was opened as the 30th General Hospital of California, a military hospital, in 1942. The hospital housed 400 injured American personnel as well as German prisoners of war.

Part of the site was used to accommodate Mansfield Secondary Technical School, taking students from 1945 housed in the Nissen huts that had been left by the US Army. It was officially opened by Sir Hubert Houldsworth, Chairman of the East Midlands Division of the National Coal Board on 22 June 1948. It later moved to new premises, becoming known as Sherwood Hall Secondary School.

Other areas of the site were used to create King's Mill Hospital. The hospital was officially opened by Hilary Marquand, the Minister of Health on 17 September 1951. The Dukeries Maternity Centre was opened by the Duchess of Devonshire on 14 January 1975.

New facilities were procured under a Private Finance Initiative contract in 2005. The works were carried out by Skanska at a cost of £300 million and opened in 2011. The design incorporated surface-solar energy heat recovery from an adjacent reservoir, which provides one-third of the heating and all of the cooling requirements for the complex. This involved submerging a grid of 140 stainless steel plates into the water at the deepest point, connected to the hospital via twin 350-millimetre (14 in) pipes laid under the A38 dual carriageway road.

After Maternity Services moved into a new Women and Children's Centre, the old Dukeries Maternity Centre was finally demolished in spring 2013.

== Facilities ==
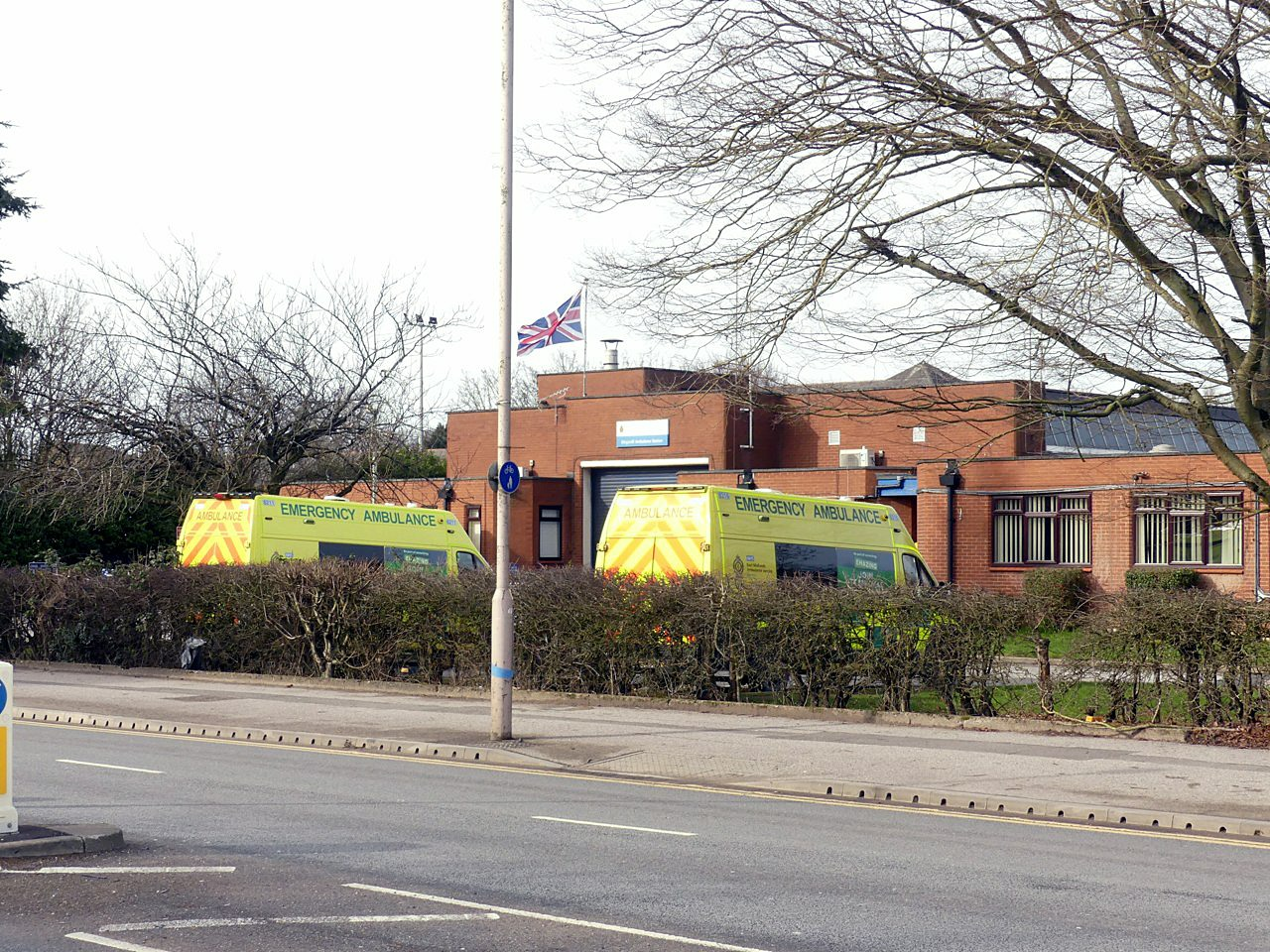
Ambulance station behind A38 road

Millside Radio provides entertainment for patients via a Hospedia wired network from in-house studios run by volunteers. Established during 1989 in an attic room at the old Dukeries Maternity Centre, the station was officially opened by Jeremy Beadle in 1990. The studios later moved into the Trust's administrative building.

The ambulance station, operated by the East Midlands Ambulance Service, opened in 1981 is located nearby on the A38 road.
