= Millside Radio =

Hospital Radio Station using wired system

Millside Hospital Radio
- England
- Broadcast area: King's Mill Hospital, Nottinghamshire

Programming
- Format: Variety

History
- First air date: 20 October 1989

Links
- Website: Millside Radio

Millside Radio provides hospital radio programmes 24 hours a day for people in King's Mill Hospital in Nottinghamshire, England, on the Mansfield and Ashfield border. It started in 1989 as a part-time service using studios at Queen's Medical Centre, Nottingham, before moving into former offices at King's Mill, where it was officially opened by Jeremy Beadle.

It broadcasts 24 hours a day in high-quality stereo using the hospital's WiFi network and via a distribution system that is free to patients for radio, but charges for other services, such as individual bedside wired telephone and television. It is also streamed free online via the website, smartphone and smart speakers.

Staffed entirely by volunteers, it is registered as a charity using the name Millside Hospital Radio.

It has live news and sports coverage broadcast on the hour. Sports updates are included in many live shows during the week. It broadcasts from outside locations, such as Asda Mansfield and B&Q Mansfield, and from events around the hospital.

The station's mascot is called Milly Bear.
