= River Maun =

River in Nottinghamshire, England

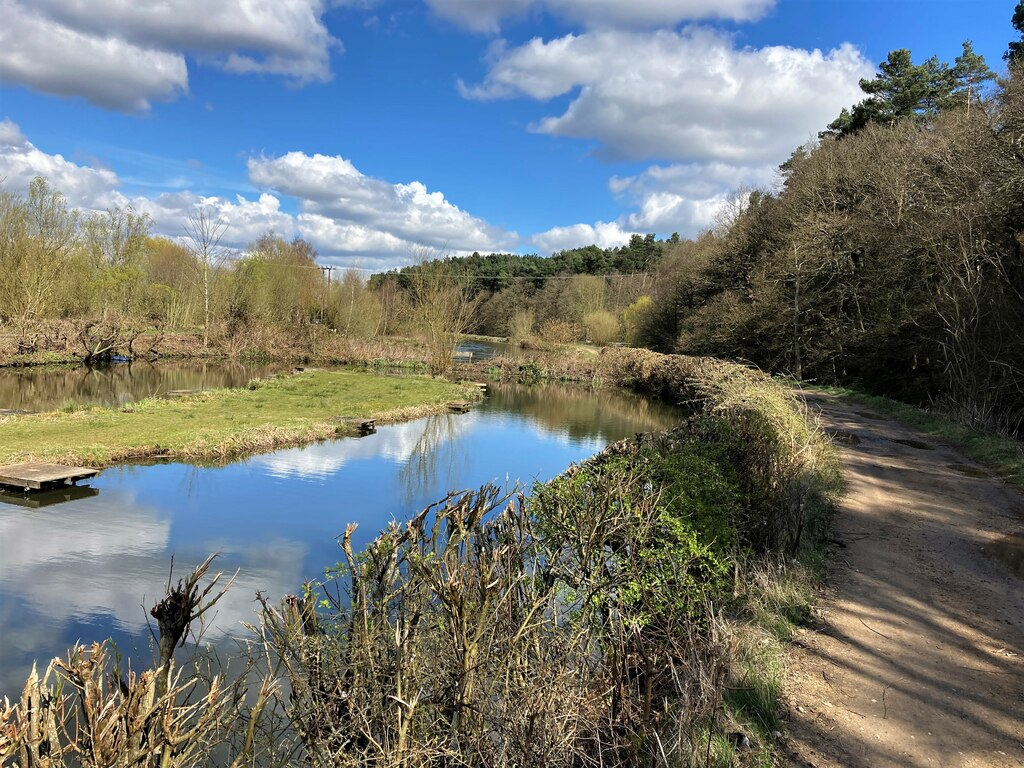
- The river by the bridleway.

Location
- Country: England
- County: Nottinghamshire

Physical characteristics
- Source
  - location: Kirkby in Ashfield
- Mouth: River Idle
  - location: Markham Moor

Basin features
- Tributaries
  - left: River Meden
  - right: Cauldwell Water, Vicar Water, Rainworth Water

The River Maun is a river in Nottinghamshire, England. Its source lies in Kirkby-in-Ashfield, and from there it flows north east through Mansfield (which takes its name from the river), Edwinstowe and Ollerton, these being the heart of the Sherwood Forest area. It becomes known as Whitewater near the village of Walesby and connects to the River Meden temporarily where the Robin Hood Way crosses them. They diverge, and near Markham Moor it merges again with the River Meden this time becoming the River Idle. Its main tributaries are Rainworth Water, Vicar Water and Cauldwell Water.

The river has been an important source of power, from at least 1086, when there was a watermill in Mansfield. A big increase in the number of mills began in the 1780s, when the frame knitting industry was decimated by the advent of Richard Arkwright's water-powered spinning frame. William Cavendish-Bentinck, 3rd Duke of Portland, encouraged the building of textile mills to relieve unemployment and poverty. Most were converted to do "cotton doubling", and several later became hosiery mills. The conversion of watermills which had formerly ground corn to textile mills led to the building of windmills to carry on milling corn. Although water power has largely ceased, there is still an operational water-mill at Ollerton.

== Course ==
The river rises on the north side of Kirkby-in-Ashfield, just to the south of Sutton Parkway railway station. It is a little above the 490-foot (150 m) contour at this point. It crosses under the railway line, and there are two short culverted sections as it crosses under the B6022 road, to emerge in the Maun Valley Industrial Park. Passing under the B6139 and the A617 roads, it feeds Kings Mill Reservoir.

The reservoir was once a medieval mill pond, but in 1837, William Bentinck, the fourth Duke of Portland agreed with the millers who leased mills further down the river that a large head of water was required to maintain the water supply throughout the year. He built a dam, and 72 acres (29 ha) of farmland were flooded, some of which he bought from the Unwin family. The work was completed by 1839, when rates to be paid by the millers were agreed, which were to be reduced after 20 years. A 1.5-mile (2.4 km) walk has been created around the lake, from where some of the waterfowl which live on it can be seen. It is also used for sailing.

At the exit from the reservoir, the river is crossed by Kings Mill viaduct, built around 1819 for the Mansfield and Pinxton Railway. The engineer for the project was Josias Jessop, and the bridge was the location for the opening ceremony of the railway. A local newspaper described it as "the beautiful five-arched bridge, constructed under the direction of Mr. Jessop, the engineer", when reporting the opening. The central arch carries the date 1817. It was adapted for locomotive traffic in 1847, was restored in 1990, and is a grade II listed structure. It is now used as a footpath, as the railway line was historically diverted around it.

The diverted railway line forms part of the Robin Hood Line, which crosses another millpond just below the reservoir. This supplied the late eighteenth century Hermitage Mill, originally a textile mill, which was then used as a building-materials depot, but has been disused for many years. After crossing under some minor roads and Sheepbridge Lane, where there was another eighteenth-century textile mill, repurposed as a joinery works, and then an internet gaming centre the river is spanned by the disused Drury Dam railway viaduct, this one built in 1875, and consisting of ten round arches, constructed of brick and rock-faced stone. At its west end, a cast-iron arch carries it over Quarry Lane. It is grade II listed, was restored in 1989, and is used as a footpath. Part of it spans the Quarry Lane local nature reserve, on the south bank of the river, where a sculpture created by Lewis Morgan was installed in December 2009. The river continues to weave through the east of Mansfield, where it has been culverted in places. At Bridge Street, the former Town Mill public house was originally the mill owner's house adjacent to the watermill, built around 1775, and restored in the late twentieth century. To the north of the B6033 Bath Lane, there is a disused textile mill, built between 1822 and 1831, which used water power. W. Goldie and Co. extended it in 1880, and altered it to work as a hosiery mill, which it continued to be until 1984. Part of it has been re-used as apartments. Next, the river passes through Carr Bank, with woodland to the east, and a large sewage treatment works to the west. The outflow from the works contributes a significant portion of the flow below this point.

After passing under the A6117 road, the river enters Maun Valley Park, a local nature reserve covering 42 acres (17 ha), which includes water meadows and other wetland habitats. New Mill Lane lies at its northern edge, after which the river passes through more rural scenery. Approaching Clipstone, Cavendish Woods lie to the south east, while extensive fish ponds are located on the other bank. Vicar Water, which flows northwards from Vicar Park, joins on the east bank, before the river is crossed by a railway at Clipstone Junction. It flows eastwards to the south of Edwinstowe, to be joined on the western edge of Ollerton by Rainworth Water, flowing northwards from Rufford Abbey. To the east of the A614 road is Ollerton Watermill, which is still operational, and is open to the public on Sundays in the summer. Passing to the west of New Ollerton, the river flows northwards through open countryside to join the River Meden. After a short distance, two channels are created by a weir, the southern one still called the River Maun, and both proceed eastwards, before turning northwards near Markham Moor roundabout on the A1 road, and joining again to form the River Idle. There are two disused water mills on this stretch, one at Haughton and one called Jacket Mill at Rockley. There were two water mills in Haughton in the reign of King Edward III, during the fourteenth century. Jacket Mill is of red brick construction, and much of it dates from the late eighteenth century, although parts were altered in the nineteenth century.

== Mills ==
The river has provided an important source of power in the past. The Domesday book, produced in 1086, mentions that Mansfield had a watermill, and there are many references to watermills thereafter. In 1292, a fulling mill is mentioned. This was situated to the north of the town, probably near to the later Stanton's Mill, and was part of the process for making woollen cloth.

Mansfield had a cottage industry, which by 1800 consisted of around 700 knitting frames. It operated as a social service, as most of the workers were either orphaned children, or children from families who would otherwise be destitute. Following the invention of the "water-frame", a spinning frame that was powered by a water wheel, which had been invented by Richard Arkwright in 1771 and used in his mills at Cromford, the cottage industry could not compete, and there was widespread unemployment and poverty in Mansfield. In an attempt to remedy the situation, William Cavendish-Bentinck, 3rd Duke of Portland, who was the landowner, and who later became Home Secretary, organised a programme of building water-powered spinning mills along the river. Hermitage Mill was the first to be built, in 1782, and still stands on Hermitage lane. Little Matlock Mill was built three years later on Sheepbridge Lane, and again still stands. Field Mill on Nottingham Road was converted to work with cotton in 1785. Immediately above it was Drury Mill, a corn mill run by Daniel Drury, but this had to be closed in 1791 when the water level in Field Mill Dam was raised, preventing Drury's wheel from working efficiently. Field Mill was in use as a leather works by 1916 and was demolished in 1925.

The next mill on the river was Town Mill, which had been built in 1744, and was used for grinding corn and malt. The miller, William Smith, negotiated with the Duke, and in 1785 he sold the corn milling equipment and refitted it for working with cotton. Having also refitted Field Mill in the autumn, he started a Sunday School in 1786, so that his young workers would be equipped with basic reading and mathematical skills, as well as moral instruction. The practice spread, and Mansfield became known for the good education of its young people. Town Mill became Old Town Mill in 1870, when a steam-powered mill was built to the east of the river, which became known as New Town Mill. Stantons Mill, the next downstream, was built in 1795. By 1900, it had been taken over by Luke Weatherall, who made workmen's boots there. The final textile mill on the river in Mansfield at the time was Bath Mill, on Bath Lane, which began operation in 1792 producing worsted cloth. Benjamin Bagshaw, John Radford and George Simes were the men behind the venture, but it was not a success, and the mill had become a cotton mill by 1800, when it also became one of the first locations in the vicinity to install a steam engine. One effect of the conversion of mills for cotton, rather than grinding corn, was that a number of windmills were built, since corn still had to be milled into flour. The number of windmills in Mansfield rose from three to thirteen between 1774 and 1824.

To the south of Mansfield, the Maun is joined by Cauldwell Water at Bleakhills. Charles and George Stanton chose Bleakhills as a suitable site for a new mill in 1795, and negotiated with the Duke of Portland for permission to build both the mill and cottages for the workers. The cost was about £300.

By 1887, most of the textile mills, including Bleakhills Mill, were marked on maps a being "cotton doubling" mills, a process in which multiple strands of cotton were wound together to form thicker threads. In 1899, only Field Mill and Bath Mill were still marked in this way. Most of the rest were then marked "Hosiery", although Stanton Mill was marked "Boot and Shoe".

There were other mills besides the textile mills. Between Field Mill and Town Mill, there was an iron foundry, called Meadow Foundry, which was built by William Bradshaw and John Sansom in 1852. The site had previously been occupied by a water-powered bark mill, and remained in the ownership of the Duke of Portland. In 1867, Bradshaw and Sansom negotiated a new 14-year lease with the Duke, which included the supply of water from King's Mill reservoir, but they became bankrupt during the following year. It was taken over by James Bownes, who formed a limited company to operate it, and it remained in use until 1960, when the firm moved to new premises, and the site was redeveloped by the Mansfield Brewery. Below the foundry was Borough Mills, which operated as a saw mill. Between Town Mills and Stanton Mill was the Rock Valley Mill, which was operated by Dickenson Ellis as a mustard mill in the early nineteenth century. It was taken over by David Cooper Barringer in 1839, who formed Barringer and Company to operate it. In 1873, they decided to pack the mustard in decorated tin boxes, instead of wooden ones, and made the boxes on site from pre-printed metal sheet. Soon they were making tin boxes for other companies, and the separate Rock Valley Tin Works was formed in 1889. Three years later, a printing works was established, to print the metal sheets, and it became a limited company in 1895. Following several takeovers, it remains in business as Carnaud Metal Box Engineering.

== Water Quality ==
The Environment Agency measure water quality of the river systems in England. Each is given an overall ecological status, which may be one of five levels: high, good, moderate, poor and bad. There are several components that are used to determine this, including biological status, which looks at the quantity and varieties of invertebrates, angiosperms and fish. Chemical status, which compares the concentrations of various chemicals against known safe concentrations, is rated good or fail. The Maun is designated as "heavily modified", which means that the channels have been altered by human activity, and the criteria for this designation are defined by the Water Framework Directive.

The water quality of the Maun and its tributaries was as follows in 2019.

Section	Ecological Status	Chemical Status	Length	Catchment	Channel
Maun from Source to Vicar Water	Moderate	Fail	11.3 miles (18.2 km)	14.61 square miles (37.8 km^{2})	heavily modified
Vicar Water from Source to Maun	Poor	Fail	2.8 miles (4.5 km)	14.61 square miles (37.8 km^{2})	
Maun from Vicar Water to Rainworth Water	Moderate	Fail	3.5 miles (5.6 km)	6.10 square miles (15.8 km^{2})	heavily modified
Rainworth Water from Gallow Hole Dyke to Maun	Poor	Fail	1.9 miles (3.1 km)	2.41 square miles (6.2 km^{2})	
Maun from Rainworth Water to Poulter	Moderate	Fail	10.0 miles (16.1 km)	10.84 square miles (28.1 km^{2})	heavily modified
Bevercotes Beck Catchment (trib of Maun)	Moderate	Fail	6.7 miles (10.8 km)	7.43 square miles (19.2 km^{2})	

Like most rivers in the UK, the chemical status changed from good to fail in 2019, due to the presence of polybrominated diphenyl ethers (PBDE), perfluorooctane sulphonate (PFOS) and mercury compounds, none of which had previously been included in the assessment.

== Points of interest ==
Point	Coordinates (Links to map resources)	OS Grid Ref	Notes
Maun and Meden form Idle	53.2685°N 0.9478°W	SK702751	mouth
A1 road bridge	53.2582°N 0.9326°W	SK713739	
Maun and Meden join and split	53.2410°N 1.0143°W	SK658720	
Jn with Rainworth Water	53.1981°N 1.0274°W	SK650672	Ollerton bridge
Edwinstowe bridge	53.1917°N 1.0633°W	SK626664	
Jn with Vicar Water	53.1799°N 1.0974°W	SK604651	Kings Clipstone
Cavendish Woods fish ponds	53.1720°N 1.1347°W	SK579642	
B6033 Bath Lane Bridge	53.1488°N 1.1844°W	SK546616	Mansfield
Kings Mill Reservoir	53.1310°N 1.2303°W	SK515595	
source near Sutton Parkway	53.1107°N 1.2461°W	SK505573	

== Bibliography ==
- Brown, Cornelius (1896). "A History of Nottinghamshire". Notts History. Archived from the original on 3 March 2016.
- CAMS (2006). The Idle and Torne Catchment Abstraction Management Strategy (PDF). Environment Agency. Archived from the original (PDF) on 15 January 2018.
- Morley, Don; Bradbury, David J (1996). From Mills to Mines. Old Mansfield Society. ISBN 978-0-9517948-1-4.
- Skempton, Sir Alec; et al. (2002). A Biographical Dictionary of Civil Engineers in Great Britain and Ireland: Vol 1: 1500 to 1830. Thomas Telford. ISBN 978-0-7277-2939-2.
