= Mansfield Central railway station =

Former railway station in Nottinghamshire, England

Mansfield Central
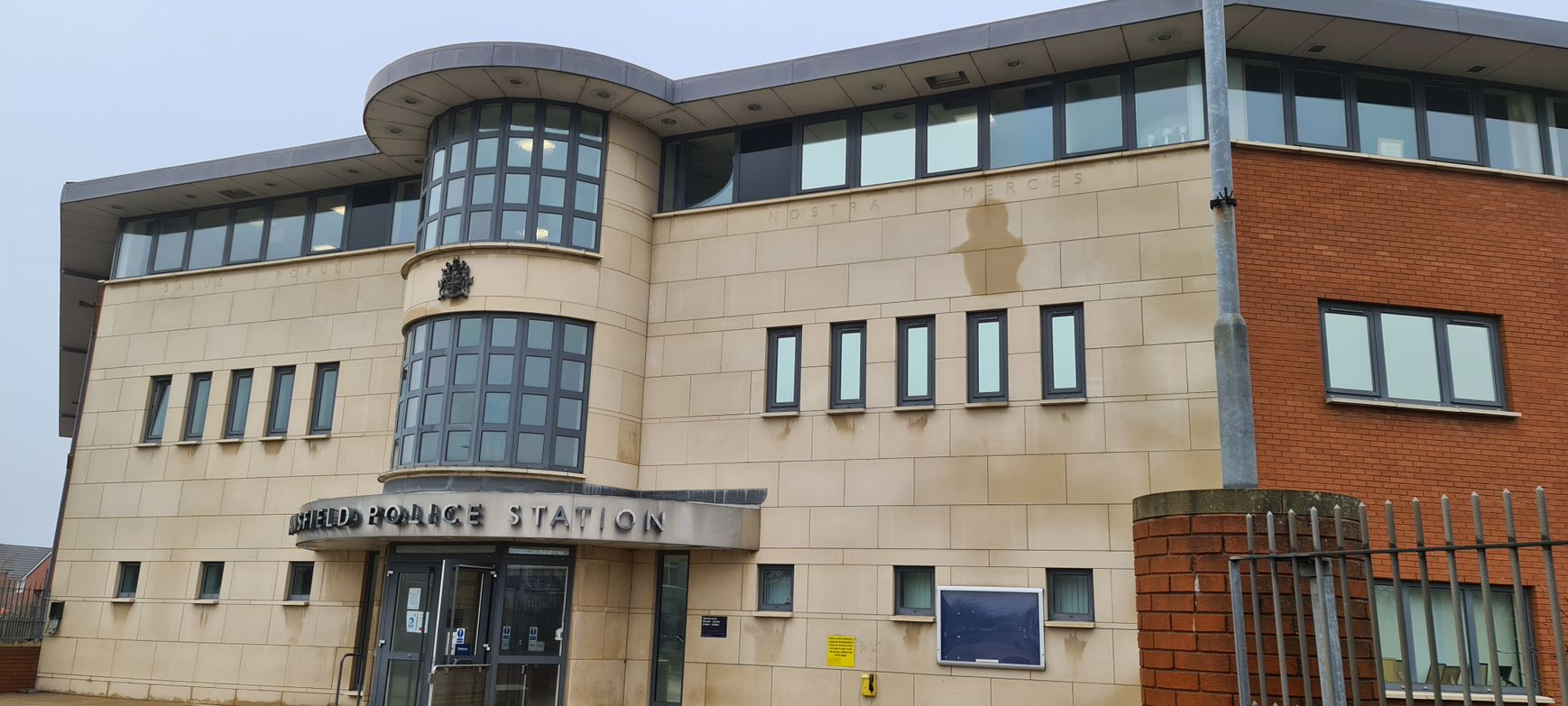
- The site of the former station is now occupied by Mansfield police station

General information
- Location: Mansfield, Mansfield District, England
- Coordinates: 53.1420°N 1.1904°W
- Grid reference: SK542608
- Platforms: 2, with an up bay

Other information
- Status: Disused

History
- Original company: Mansfield Railway
- Pre-grouping: Mansfield Railway
- Post-grouping: London and North Eastern Railway, British Railways

Key dates
- 2 April 1917: Opened
- 2 January 1956: Closed to timetabled passenger traffic
- 8 September 1956: Closed to timetabled summer Saturday holiday trains
- 8 September 1962: Seasonal excursions ended
- 13 June 1966: Closed to goods
- 7 January 1968: Line through station closed
- 1972: Station demolished
Location

Mansfield Central was a railway station that served the town of Mansfield, in Nottinghamshire, England, between 1917 and 1966.

== History ==
The station was opened in 1917 by the Mansfield Railway, along with Kirkby-in-Ashfield Central and Sutton-in-Ashfield Central. The line and its stations was worked by the Great Central Railway, which became part of the London and North Eastern Railway in 1923 and subsequently British Railways in 1948.

Most regular passenger trains plied between Nottingham Victoria and Mansfield Central, with some extending to Edwinstowe and Ollerton. In the station's early years, some services operated between Mansfield Central, Warsop and Chesterfield Market Place.

Timetabled services ceased on 2 January 1956, though summer weekend excursion traffic to Scarborough, Cleethorpes, Skegness and Mablethorpe continued until 8 September 1962.

The line through the station was closed on 7 January 1968 and subsequently lifted. The station and its associated earthworks were razed to the ground in 1972.

Preceding station	Disused railways	Following station
Warsop; Line and station closed	LNER; Mansfield Railway	Sutton-in-Ashfield Central; Line and station closed
Edwinstowe; Line and station closed	LNER; Mansfield Railway	Sutton-in-Ashfield Central; Line and station closed

== The site today ==
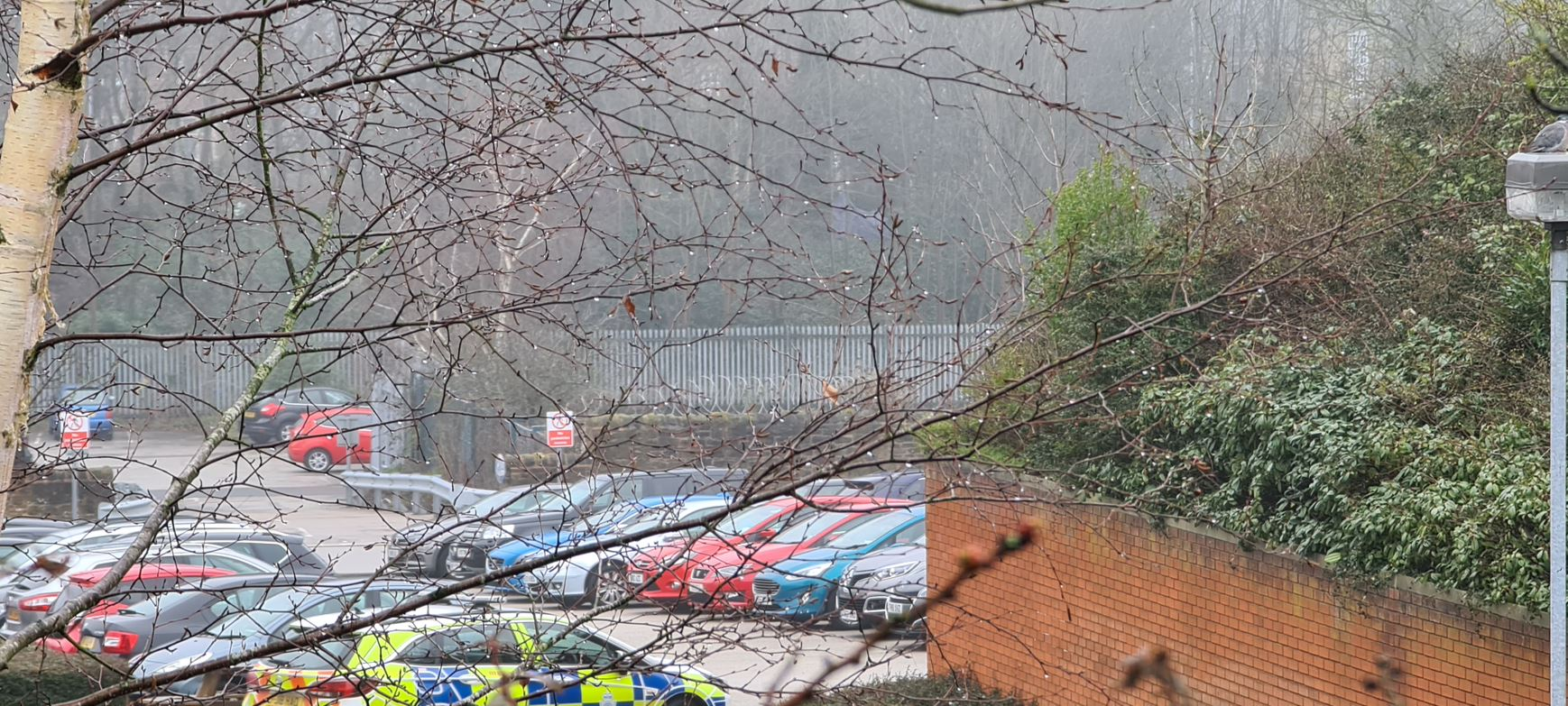
A car park now occupies part of the station site

The site of the former station is now occupied by Mansfield police station and a car park.
