= Clipstone =

Village and civil parish in Nottinghamshire, England

Coordinates: 53.1700°N 1.1073°W

- Village and civil parish
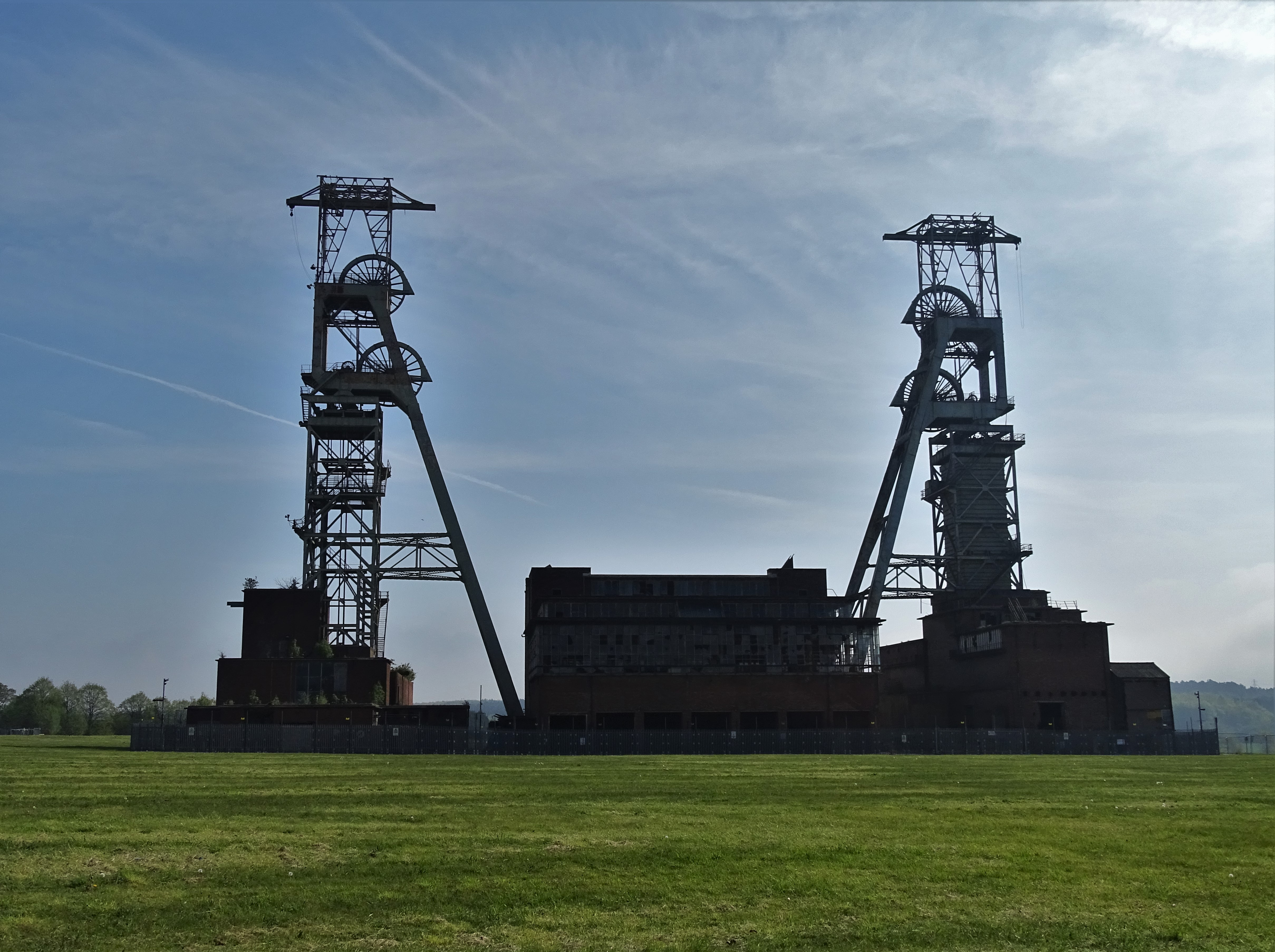
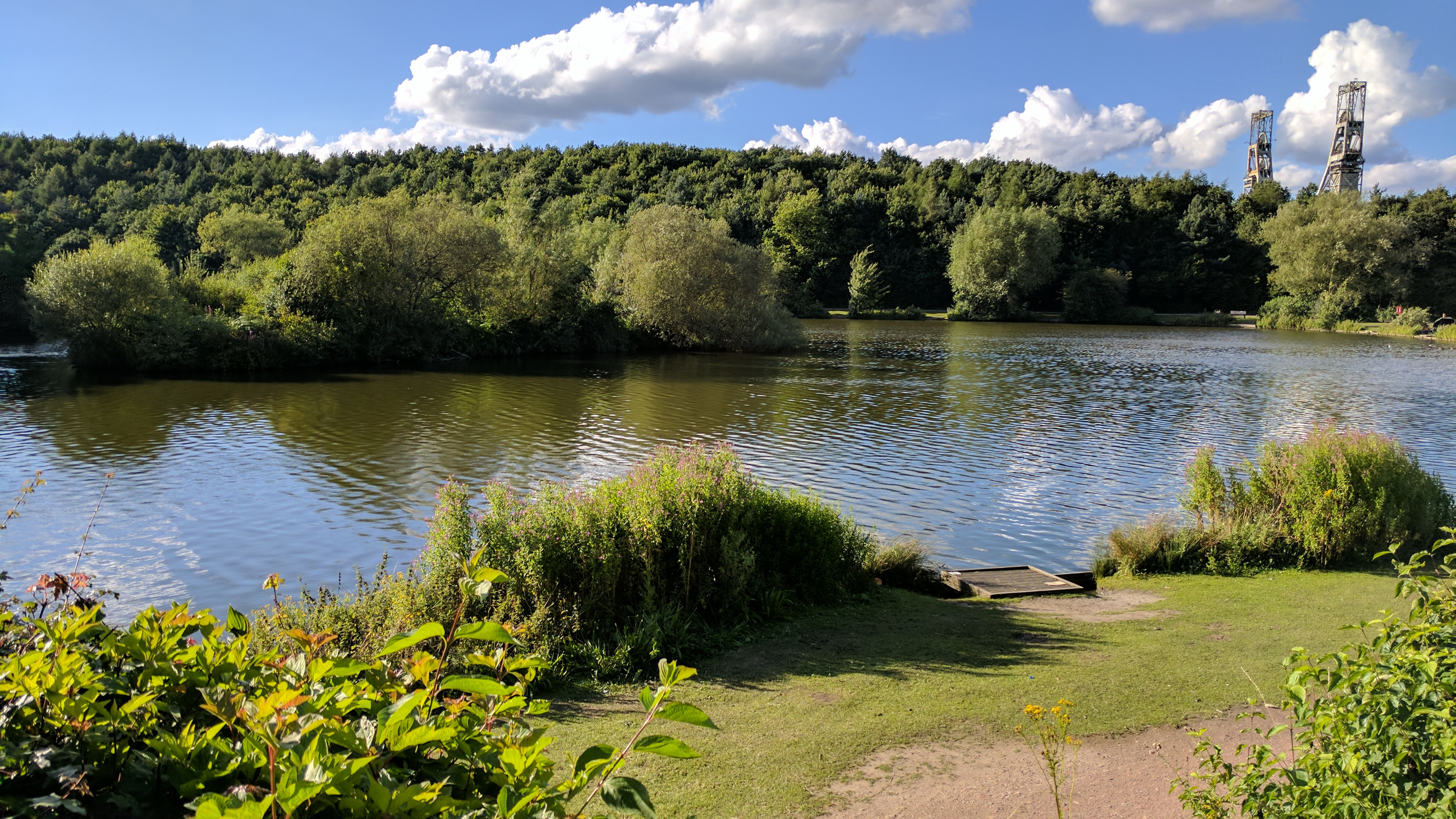
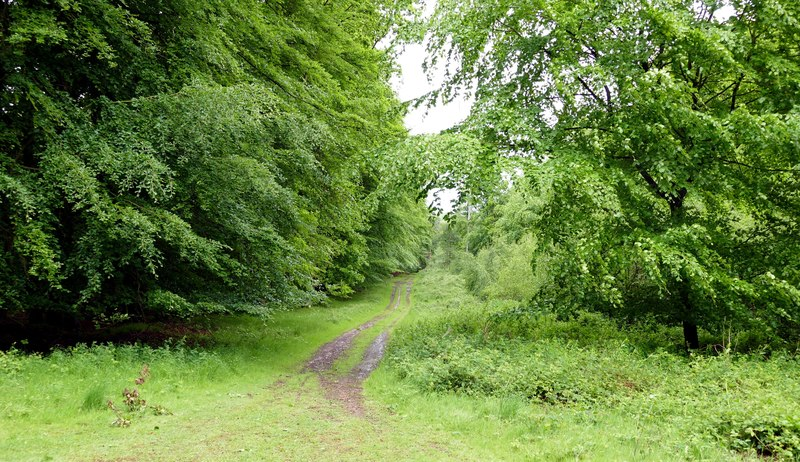
- Clipstone colliery headstocks Vicar Water The Forest

- Location within Nottinghamshire
- Interactive map of Clipstone
- Area: 1.39 sq mi (3.6 km^{2})
- Population: 6,185 (2021)
  - Density: 4,450/sq mi (1,720/km^{2})
- OS grid reference: SK 585635
  - London: 120 mi (190 km) SSE
- District: Newark and Sherwood
- Shire county: Nottinghamshire
- Region: East Midlands
- Country: England
- Sovereign state: United Kingdom
- Post town: MANSFIELD
- Postcode district: NG21
- Dialling code: 01623
- Police: Nottinghamshire
- Fire: Nottinghamshire
- Ambulance: East Midlands
- UK Parliament: Sherwood
- Website: clipstoneparishcouncil.org

Clipstone is a village in the Newark and Sherwood district of Nottinghamshire, England. The population of the civil parish was 3,469 at the 2001 census, increasing to 4,665 at the 2011 census, and substantially more so to 6,185 at the 2021 census. The village was formerly based on coal mining as part of the Industrial Revolution.

== Geography ==
Clipstone is the name of two related villages and associated civil parish areas – Clipstone, approximately four miles from Mansfield town, and Kings Clipstone slightly further away, formerly known as Clipstone and later Old Clipstone until 2003 when the ancient name of Kings Clipstone was resurrected and it was split off administratively. Both settlements lie alongside the B6030 road, with a small section known locally as the Rat Hole.

Kings Clipstone is the older village in a rural setting with some old stone buildings, noted for its relatively 'undeveloped' character. The local Dog and Duck pub is the only social place to meet.

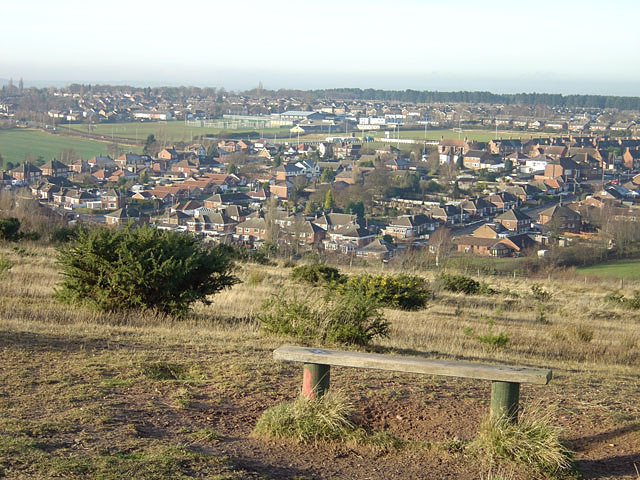
New Clipstone seen from the old colliery spoil heap

New Clipstone village (commonly known as just 'Clipstone') is the most diverse area with both old and new homes, a library, primary school and village hall as well as a few shops and pubs, including Clipstone Welfare, which was used for scenes in the 2007 film Control. The old Clipstone Colliery site lies within the New Clipstone area, still having tall prominent headstocks.

On the southern edge of Clipstone village is Vicar Water Country Park, developed from Vicar Water and the former spoil tips from the colliery, forming a landscape of hills and ponds with a controversial 'Golden Hand' sculpture, said to represent the village's mining heritage.

Most of Clipstone village is within Newark and Sherwood district council area, with a small section in the west near Forest Town in the Mansfield council area. The Garibaldi College is just inside Mansfield district. A large modern housing development close to Clipstone but previously considered as part of 'Old Clipstone'/Kings Clipstone was reclassified as being in Clipstone after a boundary realignment in late 2009.

== History ==
=== Toponymy ===
The earliest historical reference to the settlement is in the Domesday Book of 1086, where the village is mentioned as "Clipestune". Subsequent written sources use the forms "Clipestone", "Clippeston", "Clipiston". The place-name Clipstone seems to contain an Old Norse personal name, Klyppr, with tun (Old English), an enclosure or farmstead, so 'Klyppr's farm or settlement'.

=== Prehistoric period ===
The earliest date-able material from Clipstone is from the Bronze Age. These pieces of material were a spearhead and an arrowhead. There is also a suspected ring ditch in the vicinity of New Clipstone which is assumed to be a ploughed out round barrow.

The National Mapping Project data as provided by English Heritage shows a number of cropmarks recorded from aerial photography in the northern quarter of Clipstone parish, representing rectilinear field systems associated with smaller stock enclosures and perhaps domestic sites. Typologically, and from their orientation, it is assumed that these are part of the brickwork plan field system from the late Iron Age, which stretches across the Sherwood Sandstones.

=== Roman period ===
Pottery of the period is known from Clipstone due to Philip Rahtz's excavation in 1956 and Trent and Peak Archaeology's watching brief and fieldwalking in 1991, however the context of the finds has never been understood. There have also been metal detector finds within the parish of two Roman brooches and a small coin hoard and arrowhead. The adjacent parish of Mansield Woodhouse contains a suspected Roman road (Leeming Lane), with an associated marching camp at Roman Bank. Further to the north-west a small villa site was exposed in 1780 by the antiquarian Major Hayman Rooke.

=== Early Medieval period ===
Four pieces of late Saxon shelly ware pottery were recorded in 1991 during fieldwalking of Castlefield, although it is unlikely that these represent anything more than a background scatter associated with the manuring of the open fields. These four pieces of pottery are actually Potterhanworth Ware, dating to the 13th–15th century Prior to Domesday, the two manors of Clipstone were held by Osbern and Ulsi and the value was set at 60 shillings (£3). Ulsi in particular was a reasonably wealthy landowner and held manors at Greasley, Strelley, Sutton and Hodsock.

=== Domesday ===
The landowner in 1086 was Roger de Busli, one of the great Norman landowners who held 163 estates in Nottinghamshire, Derbyshire and south Yorkshire.

=== King John's Palace ===
King John's Palace is the ruined walls of a former medieval royal residence previously used for hunting trips into Sherwood Forest near to Kings Clipstone. While there is no conclusive proof of the medieval royal residence being built by King John, there were known to be 1400 acres of forested deer park (and 70 acres of rabbit warrens) next to the village, which were used by royal hunting parties. Moreover, it is said that King John held a parliament at the nearby Parliament Oak in 1212, and also Edward I in 1290. The ruin appeared on an episode of the archaeological TV show Time Team.

=== Industrial Revolution ===
Industrialisation efforts included George Sitwell, ironmaster mining iron locally and he built a furnace in the 17th century.

=== Clipstone riot ===
In 1767 much of the local forest was managed by the Duke of Portland for the production of timber. In the 1760s there were a number of prosecutions of local people for entering the forest park and causing disorders. In 1767 labourers from Warsop and Worksop were involved in the Clipstone Riot. As the Duke of Portland was at the time involved in making the place more profitable for himself, and so impacting on the timber rights of the commoners, this may have been the cause of the riots.

=== 1965 air accident ===
On November 12 1965 BAC Jet Provost XM406 crashed, from RAF Syerston. Pilot Officer I.G. Parfitt ejected.

=== Clipstone Camp ===
Located on what was to become Clipstone Colliery, Clipstone Camp was established when work on developing the mine, started in 1912, was abandoned following the outbreak of the First World War. The Duke of Portland offered the land for use as a military training camp, which was eventually opened in February, 1915. The first troops stationed there were the Royal Fusiliers. At its height the camp could accommodate 30,000 soldiers.

The camp had segregated 'lines' for whole individual battalions, self-contained with sleeping quarters, cook houses, mess rooms and parade grounds. Training facilities included mock-trenches, gunnery ranges and recreation with swimming in Vicar's Pond.

Following the armistice troops from the Queens Royal West Surrey 4th/5th Reserve Battalion and the York and Lancaster Regiment were involved in a mutinous riot at the camp, following disquiet at the slow rate of being demobilised.

Plans were started in 2013 to provide a memorial to those who trained in Clipstone.

=== Clipstone Colliery ===
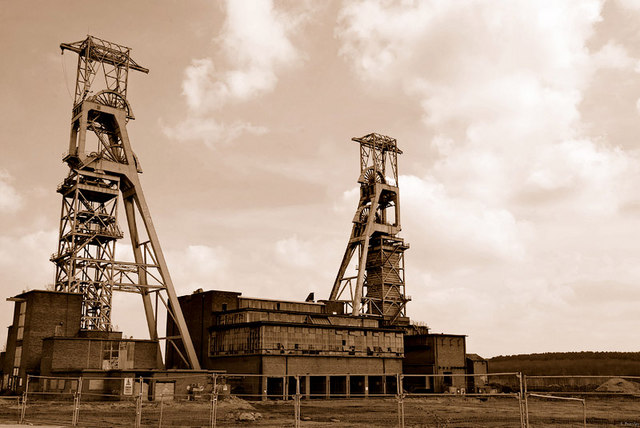
Clipstone colliery

The mine closed in April 2003. Since 1993 it had been owned by RJB Mining (later UK Coal). The present headstocks, Grade Two listed structures, were at the time of completion in 1953 the tallest in Europe. They can be seen from miles around. There were a number of attempts by then-owners, Welbeck Estates, to demolish due to the expense of the upkeep. During September 2014, an epetition was submitted to the British government, to raise public support and awareness, which ran until March 2015.

In December 2020 it was announced that the buildings, headstocks and surrounding land had been purchased by a Mansfield-based developer, with plans are to save the headstocks and redevelop the site as a "multi-purpose leisure facility." Clipstone Colliery Sidings railway station was the station that served the mine.

== Governance and demography ==
The area is managed at the first level of public administration by Clipstone Parish Council.

At district level, the wider area is managed by Newark and Sherwood District Council, and by Nottinghamshire County Council at its highest tier.

The parish had a population of 3,469 at the 2001 census, increasing to 4,665 at the 2011 census, and 6,185 at the 2021 census.

== Culture and community ==
The local football team is Clipstone Welfare. The village is close to Sherwood Forest. Nearby is the medium-wave transmitter for Radio Nottingham. There is also a slaughterhouse.

In 2022, ITVX show Without Sin, starring Nottinghamshire actress Vicky McClure, was partly filmed in Clipstone. Some scenes were filmed within the village, including a rave in the former colliery.
