= Clipstone Colliery =

Mine in Nottinghamshire, England

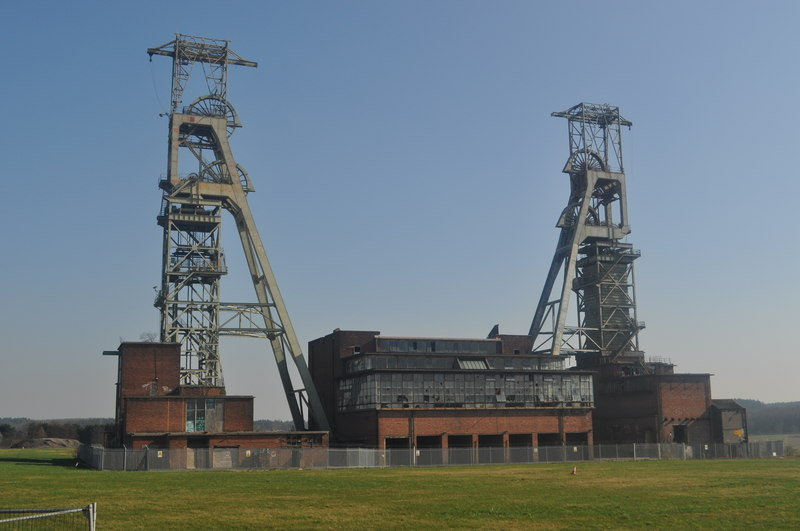
- The headstocks at Clipstone Colliery

- Location in Nottinghamshire
- Location: Nottinghamshire, Nottinghamshire, England; 53°09′47″N 1°06′36″W
- Products: Coal
- Production: 1 million tons (1986)
- Greatest depth: 920 m (3,020 ft)
- Opened: 1922
- Active: 1922 to 2003
- Closed: 2003
- Company: Bolsover Colliery Company; British Coal; RJB Mining

Clipstone Colliery was a coal mine in the village of Clipstone, Nottinghamshire. The colliery opened in 1922 and operated until 2003. It was built by the Bolsover Colliery Company, transferred to the National Coal Board in 1947, then operated by RJB Mining from 1994. The headstocks and powerhouse are grade II listed buildings so have been preserved.

== History ==
The colliery was opened in 1922 to exploit the Barnsley coal seam or Tophard, as it is known locally. By the late 1930s it was producing 4,000 tons of coal per day.

The nationalisation of the UK's coal mining industry in 1946, and the establishment of the National Coal Board, led to increased investment in new facilities. As part of this programme Clipstone colliery was expanded to access and exploit the Low Main Seam located about 800 feet (244 m) below the Top Hard seam. The shafts were deepened to over 1000 yards (920 m) to exploit these seams.

Two new headstocks and winding engines were constructed, and were commissioned in 1953. The headstocks, built by Head Wrightson Colliery Engineering were the tallest in Europe at the time. The winding engines, manufactured by Markham and Company, were Koepe friction winders which enabled deeper coal seams to be exploited. Drum winders had traditionally been used in British mines, but were designed to operate at a specific depth and had to be replaced if deeper shafts had to be sunk. The north or No.1 service shaft was used for personnel and transporting equipment, the south No.2 winding shaft was used to raise coal skips.

Clipstone colliery employed 1,300 people at its peak.

Clipstone colliery was connected to the national railway network via the colliery's four dedicated sidings off the Mansfield branch line. Prior to their closure Thorsby, Welbeck, Ollerton, Bevercotes, Mansfield, Rufford, Blidworth and Blisthorpe collieries and High Marnham power station were also connected to the Mansfield/High Marnham branch lines. The 1,000 MW High Marnham power station was the largest generating station in Europe when it was commissioned in October 1962, and burned around 10,000 tonnes of coal per day, consuming coal from 17 collieries. The branch to Clipstone colliery has since been lifted.

In 1986 Clipstone colliery produced a million tons of coal.

The colliery was closed and mothballed by British Coal, as the National Coal Board had become, in 1993. It was reopened by RJB Mining (now UK Coal) in April 1994, the licence to dig for coal being limited to the Yard seam which is located at a depth of 957 yards (870 m). The colliery was finally closed in April 2003.

== After mining ==
The headstocks and winding house were listed in April 2000. The remaining structures on the site became derelict and have been demolished.

In 2014, Welbeck Estates – then-owners of the headstocks – submitted a planning application mooting demolition, whilst local pressure group – Clipstone Colliery Regeneration Trust – was raising a petition to garner support.

The buildings, headstocks and surrounding land were purchased by a private developer in December 2020. Plans are to save the headstocks and redevelop the site as a "multi-purpose leisure facility", and museum.
