= Rainworth Water =

Tributary of the River Maun near Rainworth, Nottinghamshire, England

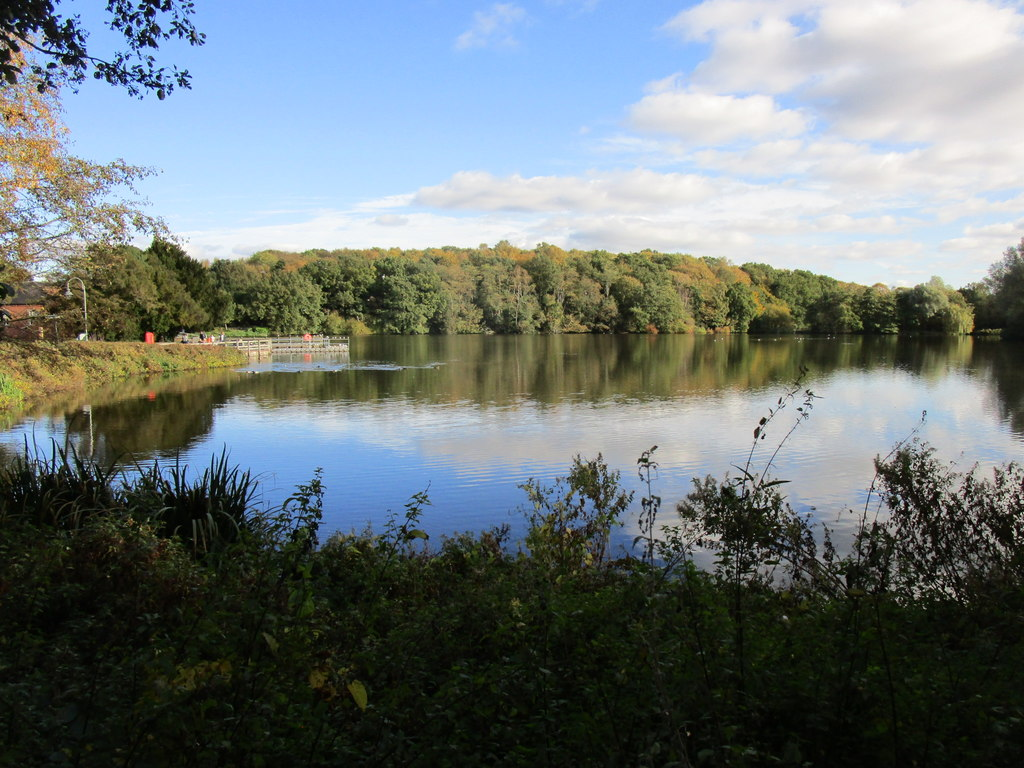
- Rufford Lake, which is fed by Rainworth Water

Location
- Country: England
- County: Nottinghamshire

Physical characteristics
- Source
  - location: Ravenshead
- Mouth: River Maun
  - location: Ollerton
- Length: 12.5 mi (20.1 km)

Basin features
- Tributaries
  - left: Foulevil Brook
  - right: Gallow Hole Dyke

Rainworth Water is a watercourse that is a tributary of the River Maun near Rainworth, Nottinghamshire, England. It is characterised by a number of lakes, including that which forms part of the country park at Rufford Abbey. L Lake at Rainworth forms part of the Rainworth Lakes Site of Special Scientific Interest. There are two designated Local Nature Reserves along its length, one of which is also known by the name Rainworth Water. The Rainworth Water LNR is owned and managed by Nottinghamshire County Council.

== River course ==
The river rises in Normanshill Wood, to the north-west of Ravenshead and flows eastwards, passing under the A60 road, and to the south of Portland Training College. There are two lakes created by dams, which were once fish ponds. To the north of the second lake is Fountain Dale moat, which is known to have existed in 1251, when there was a hunting lodge on the 52-by-38-yard (48 by 35 m) island, from which tolls were collected by the forester Raffe Clerc. There is a 46-foot (14 m) wide causeway across the north-eastern corner of the moat, which is around 39 feet (12 m) wide, with a substantial bank beyond that. The site has not been disturbed since it was abandoned, and so is better preserved than many residential moated sites in Britain. To the south of the lake is the Grade II listed Fountain Dale House, dating from the mid-eighteenth and nineteenth centuries. At the outlet of the lake is a Grade II listed well head constructed of ashlar and red brick, called Friar Tuck's well, after which the river turns to the north-east to reach another artificial lake called Cave Pond. Passing under Blidworth Lane on the outskirts of Rainworth, it enters an L-shaped lake, called "L Lake", the other branch of which is fed by Foulevil Brook. The main lake covers an area of 4.0 acres (1.62 ha) and is a private fishery, stocked with bream, carp, pike, roach and tench. It forms part of the Rainworth Lakes Site of Special Scientific Interest (SSSI), which covers an area of 36.2 acres (14.6 ha) and has been designated because of the variety of plant species which grow in the open water and adjacent marsh. The naturalist Joseph Whitaker lived by the lakes at Rainworth Lodge. The river passes through the centre of Rainworth village, under the B6020 and the A617 Rainworth bypass. Rainworth Sewage Treatment Works is located on its north-east bank, as is the Rainworth Water local nature reserve, after which it is culverted to pass under a railway embankment associated with Rufford Colliery. By Inkersall Manor there are ponds on both sides with earthworks at the eastern end, located in an area of woodland known as Damside Covert. It was at one time a large wetland, and possibly a lake.

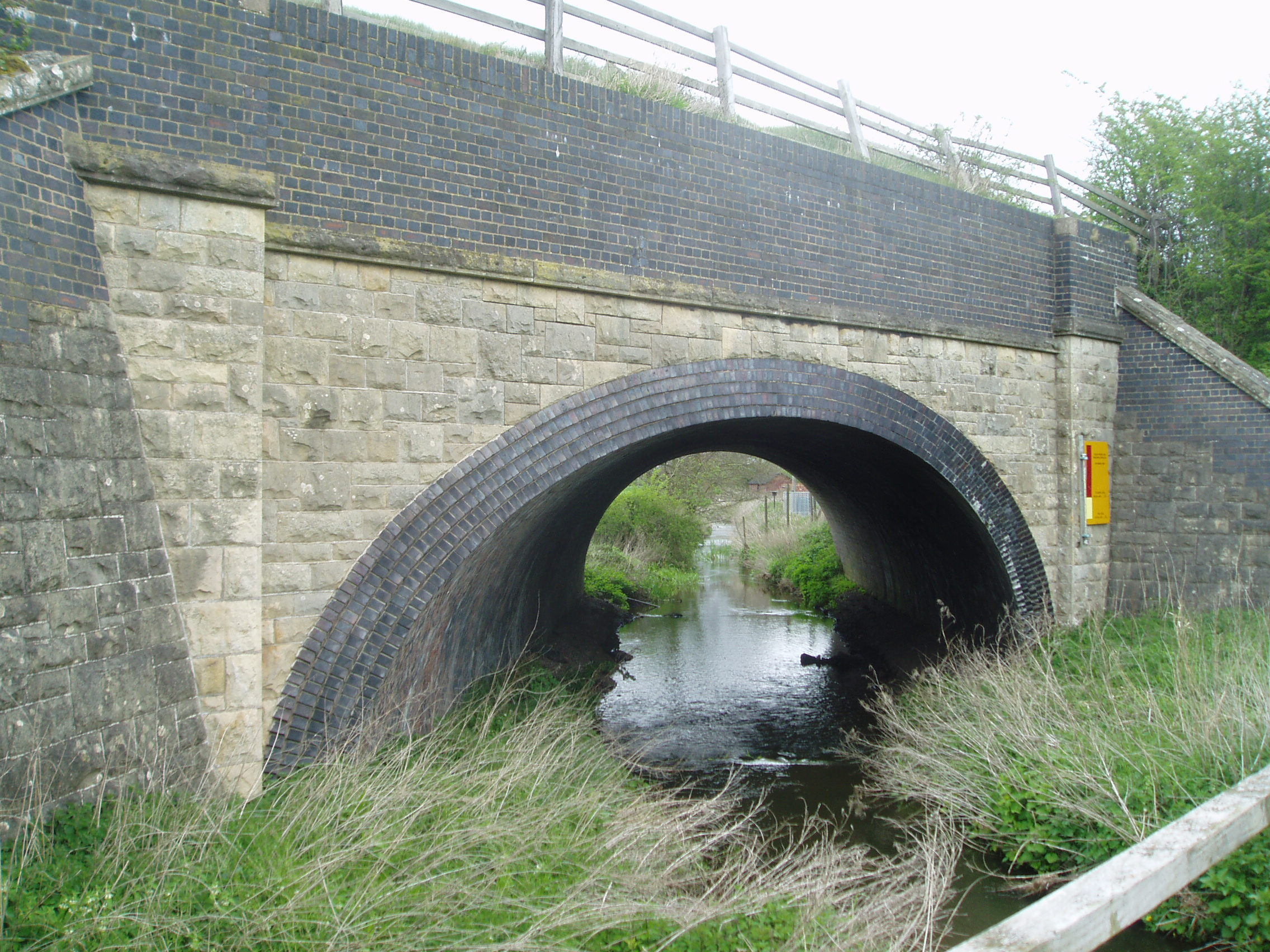
A skew bridge carries Rainworth Water through a railway embankment just before it joins the River Maun

Another lake is located to the east of the woodland, and then Red Bridge carries the A614 over the river. Beyond the road, it turns north, passing under a minor road and a disused railway embankment to the west of Bilsthorpe, with Bilsthorpe Sewage Works on its east bank. Robin Dam Bridge carries another minor road over it, after which the holiday complex of Center Parcs is located to its west. Although separated from the river by the A614 road, the complex has over 1000 villas, together with bars, shops and cafes, and is of sufficient size that it maintains its own private sewage treatment works, the outflow from which swells the flow of Gallow Hole Dyke before it joins Rainworth Water. The river then reaches the southern boundary of the country park at Rufford Abbey, where Gallow Hall Dyke joins it from the east. Parts of Gallow Hall Dyke and some ponds on the eastern edge of Rufford Lake form the Rufford Country Park Local Nature Reserve. In addition to supporting aquatic and marginal plants, it supports a population of water voles and breeding waterfowl. The Cistercian Abbey was founded in 1147 by Gilbert de Gant, but was partly demolished in 1560 and converted into a country house. After extensions were added in the eighteenth and nineteenth century, it was partly demolished again in 1959. It is a grade I listed structure and an ancient monument, managed by English Heritage. Beyond the ruins of the Abbey, a large lake has been created by a dam at the northern edge of the park, which supplied a water-powered saw-mill. The main building was erected around 1740, and an undershot waterwheel with its gearing is still in situ. The monks at Rufford Abbey are known to have had a water mill, but Sir George Savile chose the present site for his corn mill, where he built a three-storey building with a large dome on the roof. The building was constructed of brick and stone, in a classical style, and was powered by two waterwheels. In the 1860s, Captain Henry Savile began exploiting timber from the estate commercially, and built a saw mill to the east of the corn mill, in a similar style. By that time, one wheel had been removed, and the remaining wheel was refurbished. It only powered the saw mill, as corn milling ceased in 1865. The saw mill was still in working order when the estate was sold in 1938. Oates of Worksop bought it as a going concern, and used it until 1949. Much of the estate including the mill was bought by Nottinghamshire County Council in the 1950s, and became Rufford Country Park in 1969.

By the mid-1970s, the lake had become silted up, and a programme of dredging and landscaping was carried out by the council. Subsidence, caused by coal mining, created problems in the 1980s, and extensive repairs were needed to both the lake and the dam, which were completed in 1991. Below Rufford Lake, Rainworth Water crosses the road to Wellow by a ford. On the southern edge of Ollerton, the A614 road crosses again, and the river is carried through a railway embankment by a skew bridge. Just beyond, the river joins the River Maun close to another bridge carrying the A614 over the combined flow.

Most of the course of the river runs through the local government district of Newark and Sherwood, although the source is in Ashfield, and it then forms the boundary between Ashfield and Gedling for a short distance. At Rainworth, it briefly defines the border between Mansfield District and the district of Newark and Sherwood. The catchment is low-lying and largely rural, and although horses are kept on fields near the village of Rainworth, and pigs are kept between Rainworth and Bilsthorpe, most of the land use is arable, including several areas of forest managed by the Forestry Commission.

== Engineering ==
Rufford Lake is contained by a dam at its northern end which is some 660 feet (200 m) long and 13 feet (4 m) high. Because the volume of water it contains exceeds 880 thousand cubic feet (25,000 m^{3}), it has been subject to the conditions of the Reservoir (Safety Provisions) Act 1930. The lake is located over an area where deep coal mining has taken place for many years, and the resultant subsidence has caused the relative levels between the dam crest, the bed of the lake and the overflow spillway to alter. This has required significant engineering works to be carried out, which have been complicated by the presence of a listed mill building in the vicinity, and the fact that the site is a public amenity. In 1974, the dam had to be raised and sealed, the overflow works were reconstructed, and a retaining wall was built on the upstream side of the mill building. The outlet weir, which controls the level of the lake under normal conditions, is at the eastern end of the dam. Water is directed to it by a curved wall on the upstream side, and the outlet channel curves round to the front of the mill building before flowing across the road as a ford. Some 130 feet (40 m) of the curved wall was capped with concrete to create a level weir crest to the main spillway. Water running over the wall ran down a gentle slope, formed of interlocking hollow concrete blocks filled with earth and grassed over. This provided protection up to a 1 in 100 year flood event. More serious flood events discharged water over a low point in the dam nearer to the mill, onto an auxiliary spillway.

At the southern end of the lake, Rainworth Water is joined by Gallow Hole Dyke, and there was originally a single channel for the last 330 yards (300 m) down to the lake. In wet periods, this resulted in high water levels above that point, and to reduce the risk of flooding, a flood relief channel was constructed in 1986, running from the junction to the lake, and parallel with the natural course. Subsidence continued to affect the lake, and in 1988, the inspecting engineer decided that the lowering of the dam crest, particularly near the mill, required a wall to be built to protect the building from water overtopping the dam. Later that same year, the freeboard of the dam had become sufficiently small that the water level was reduced until a more permanent solution could be implemented. British Coal asked the engineering consultants Binnie and Partners to study the problem and advise on solutions in October 1989.

The level was lowered by raising the wooden overflow gates which were fitted to the top of the outlet weir. With the level of the lake lowered, much of the southern end of the lake was dry, and water only entered the lake through the flood relief channel, because the original channel had become clogged with silt as a result of subsidence. Continuing subsidence meant that the dam freeboard was reduced to a height below that required by the reservoir safety legislation, and any work carried out could not make flooding above the lake worse, as this had previously resulted in a High Court action. In order to reinstate the required freeboard, two options were considered. The first was to raise the crest of the dam by 1.6 feet (0.5 m), while the second was to lower the height of the main and auxiliary spillways by a similar amount. The second option was preferred, because of the impact on the aesthetics of the area of a larger wall in front of the mill building, and raising the crest of the dam would have required major strengthening of the existing concrete walls, which were cracked as a result of the subsidence.

The main spillway was lowered by 14 inches (0.35 m), and both it and the auxiliary spillway were made wider. The slope below the spillways had to be reprofiled, and the grassed appearance was maintained by the use of more hollow concrete blocks. The gates on the top of the outlet weir were positioned so that their tops were 6 inches (150 mm) below the spillway crest. In order to maintain wheelchair access across the path over the auxiliary spillway, ramps with a slope of 1 in 10 were constructed at either end of the spillway. The rest of the dam needed its freeboard wall to be raised by a small amount to ensure that it retained a freeboard of 1.3 feet (0.4 m) above the maximum expected flood level. This was achieved by removing the header course of bricks, adding an extra course of bricks, and finishing the wall with magnesian limestone coping, to match the detailing of the mill.

With the water level permanently lowered, some work was required at the southern end of the lake to rewater the dry sections. The bottom of the lake consists of a layer of black sediment, thought to have come from the nearby colliery, which provides an impervious lining, with sand and gravel below that. The silt was removed, the sand and gravel were then excavated, and the silt reinstated to re-seal the lake. This technique was also used on the channel between the lake and the junction of Gallow Hole Dyke and Rainworth Water. A contract for the work was awarded in late 1990, with work expected to take five months and be completed by Easter 1991. Public access to the park was maintained throughout, and the work was actually completed in May 1991, when a statutory inspection was carried out and refilling of the lake began. However, it had to be drained again later that year to allow British Coal to seal a fissure in the bed of the lake caused by mining subsidence. Refilling began in March 1992. In November 1992, high rainfall meant that water ran over the main spillway, and there was serious disruption of the downstream concrete blockwork and grass. This was replaced by textured concrete paving in a contract awarded in early 1993, and the spillway performed well subsequently.

== Nature Reserve ==
Rainworth Water LNR was once part of Rufford Colliery, which created the spoil heaps that form a bowl around the watercourse. The spoil heaps were restored after the colliery closure and the planting of thousands of broadleaved trees and other woodland species have stabilised the ground. The Water itself is a wetland habitat consisting of artificial pools, shallows and meanders that appear natural and support dragonflies and damselflies. Marshy areas have developed naturally alongside the watercourse since restoration, as have open grassland and dense scrubland. A colony of dingy skipper butterflies, which are rare within Nottinghamshire, inhabit the open grasslands. The area was declared a Local Nature Reserve in 2005. Most maintenance work on the reserve is conducted by Nottinghamshire County Council but some is undertaken by the Friends of Tippings Wood.

The Rainworth Lakes SSSI covers the main lake and its immediate environs from the point at which Rainworth Water passes under Blidworth Lane. To the west, it extends along the course of the Foulevil Brook, and includes an area to the west of the lane. The streams drain areas where the underlying rock consists of Bunter pebble beds from the Triassic period, and the sandstone results in the water being base poor and hence slightly acidic. The site is noted for some of the best base-poor marshland and open-water plant communities in Nottinghamshire. Both the marsh and the lakes contain species which are not common in most of the East Midlands.

Under the National Environment Programme, the Severn Trent Water company in collaboration with the Environment Agency has a scheme to maintain flows through the SSSI by pumping groundwater when those flows fall below a certain level. This was funded under the provisions of their AMP3 Asset Management Period, which ran from 2000 to 2005.

== Water quality ==
Since 2003, the Water Framework Directive has provided a legal framework for the protection and improvement of water quality for surface water and groundwater. This has been worked out locally by appointing the Nottinghamshire Wildlife Trust to act as Catchment Hosts for the River Idle Catchment, which includes Rainworth Water, in 2013. Their role has been to draw together all those who are affected by or can affect water quality, so that alterations that will improve water quality can be made. Initial discussions revealed that parts of both the River Ryton and Rainworth Water were failing to meet the water quality demanded by the Water Framework Directive, and were therefore given special consideration. Much of the river channel has been straightened over the years, to ensure that large quantities of water can be removed from the area during wet periods or flooding incidents. Such flows scour the channel, making it difficult for wildlife to establish itself, and during the summer months, there are issues with low flows, as water is abstracted to irrigate the sandy, well-drained arable land which borders the river.

The ecological status of the river system in 2013 failed because of the presence of pollutants, notably Triclosan in Rainworth Water and copper in Gallow Hole Dyke. Rainworth Water was also affected by nickel and its compounds, tributyltin compounds, and nonylphenol, while Gallow Hole Dyke was affected by compounds of nickel, cadmium and lead. These issues are exacerbated by low flows, run-off of surface water from roads which cross the catchment, diffuse pollution from agriculture and urban areas, and the discharges from sewage treatment works. The work undertaken on assessing the catchment resulted in proposals for eleven schemes which will produce benefits to the river system. They depend on funding being secured, and include several projects to create wetland habitats. Typical of such schemes is an area of wetland at Thieves Wood that would allow run-off from the A60 to deposit silt, and chemical contaminants to be removed before the water enters the main river. It would also create a head of water, which would be released into the river more slowly, levelling out the periods of high flow and low flow.

The Environment Agency are responsible for measuring water quality of the river systems in England. Each is given an overall ecological status, which may be one of five levels: high, good, moderate, poor and bad. There are several components that are used to determine this, including biological status, which looks at the quantity and varieties of invertebrates, angiosperms and fish. Chemical status, which compares the concentrations of various chemicals against known safe concentrations, is rated good or fail.

The water quality of Rainworth Water and its tributaries was as follows in 2019.

Section	Ecological Status	Chemical Status	Length	Catchment
Rainworth Water from Source to Gallow Hole Dyke	Moderate	Fail	6.8 miles (10.9 km)	22.99 square miles (59.5 km^{2})
Gallow Hole Dyke Catchment	Poor	Fail	2.4 miles (3.9 km)	6.42 square miles (16.6 km^{2})
Rainworth Water from Gallow Hole Dyke to Maun	Poor	Fail	1.9 miles (3.1 km)	2.41 square miles (6.2 km^{2})

Like most rivers in the UK, the chemical status changed from good to fail in 2019, due to the presence of polybrominated diphenyl ethers (PBDE) and mercury compounds, neither of which had previously been included in the assessment.

== Points of interest ==
Point	Coordinates (Links to map resources)	OS Grid Ref	Notes
Jn with River Maun	53.1980°N 1.0280°W	SK650672	
Rufford sawmill	53.1834°N 1.0325°W	SK647655	
Jn with Gallow Hole Dyke	53.1748°N 1.0303°W	SK649646	
Disused railway bridge	53.1440°N 1.0426°W	SK641611	
Inkersall Lakes	53.1377°N 1.0629°W	SK627604	
L Lake	53.1178°N 1.1258°W	SK586582	
Ponds	53.1059°N 1.1544°W	SK567568	
Source in Normanshill Wood	53.1007°N 1.1890°W	SK544562	

== Bibliography ==
- CAMS (2006). The Idle and Torne Catchment Abstraction Management Strategy (PDF). Environment Agency. Archived from the original (PDF) on 15 January 2018.
- De Lande Long, P G; Scott, C W (1998). "The restoration of Rufford Lake". The Prospect for Reservoirs in the 21st Century. British Dam Society (ICE). ISBN 9780727727046.
- ICP (2015). "Rainworth Water Masterplan 2014/2015" (PDF). Idle Catchment Partnership. Archived from the original (PDF) on 30 May 2018.
- Ofwat (2015). Financeability and financing the asset base – a discussion paper (PDF). Ofwat. Archived (PDF) from the original on 6 October 2015.
