= Lindhurst =

Coordinates: 53.114°N 1.157°W

- Civil parish
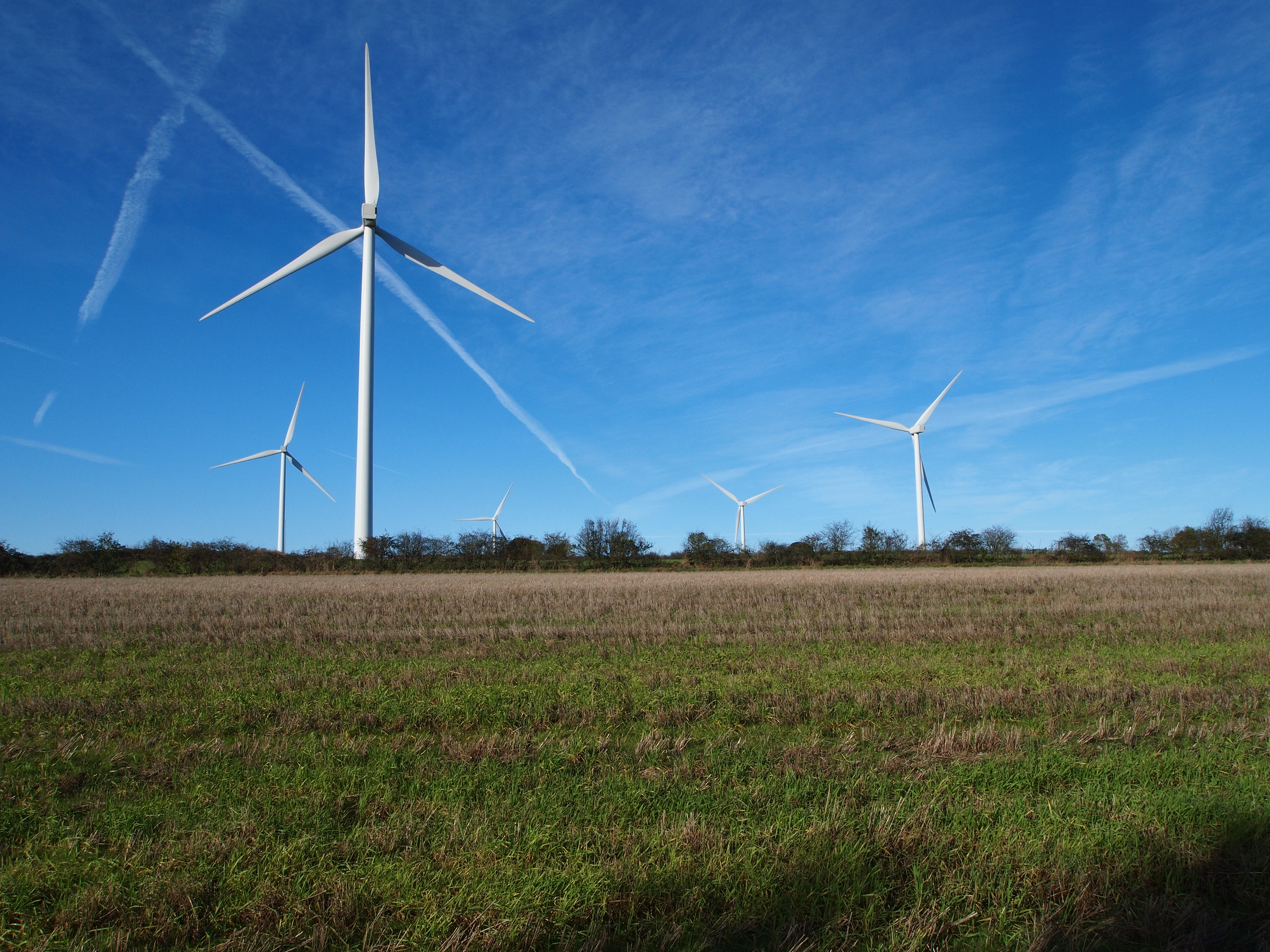
- Lindhurst Wind Farm

- Location within Nottinghamshire
- Interactive map of Lindhurst
- Area: 1.40 sq mi (3.6 km^{2})
- Population: 14 (2021)
  - Density: 10/sq mi (3.9/km^{2})
- OS grid reference: SK 564578
  - London: 120 mi (190 km) SE
- District: Newark and Sherwood
- Shire county: Nottinghamshire
- Region: East Midlands
- Country: England
- Sovereign state: United Kingdom
- Post town: MANSFIELD
- Postcode district: NG18
- Dialling code: 01623
- Police: Nottinghamshire
- Fire: Nottinghamshire
- Ambulance: East Midlands
- UK Parliament: Sherwood

Lindhurst is a civil parish and hamlet in the Newark and Sherwood district, is 120 miles (190 km) north west of London, 11 miles (18 km) north of Nottingham the county town, and 3 miles (4.8 km) south east of Mansfield, the nearest market town and bordering its district border. It sits within western Nottinghamshire county, England.

At the time of the 2011 census the population was less than 100 people and so actual numbers were not given, instead combined with neighbouring Rainworth for a total of 6,315 residents. In 2021 however, the population was given as 14 residents.

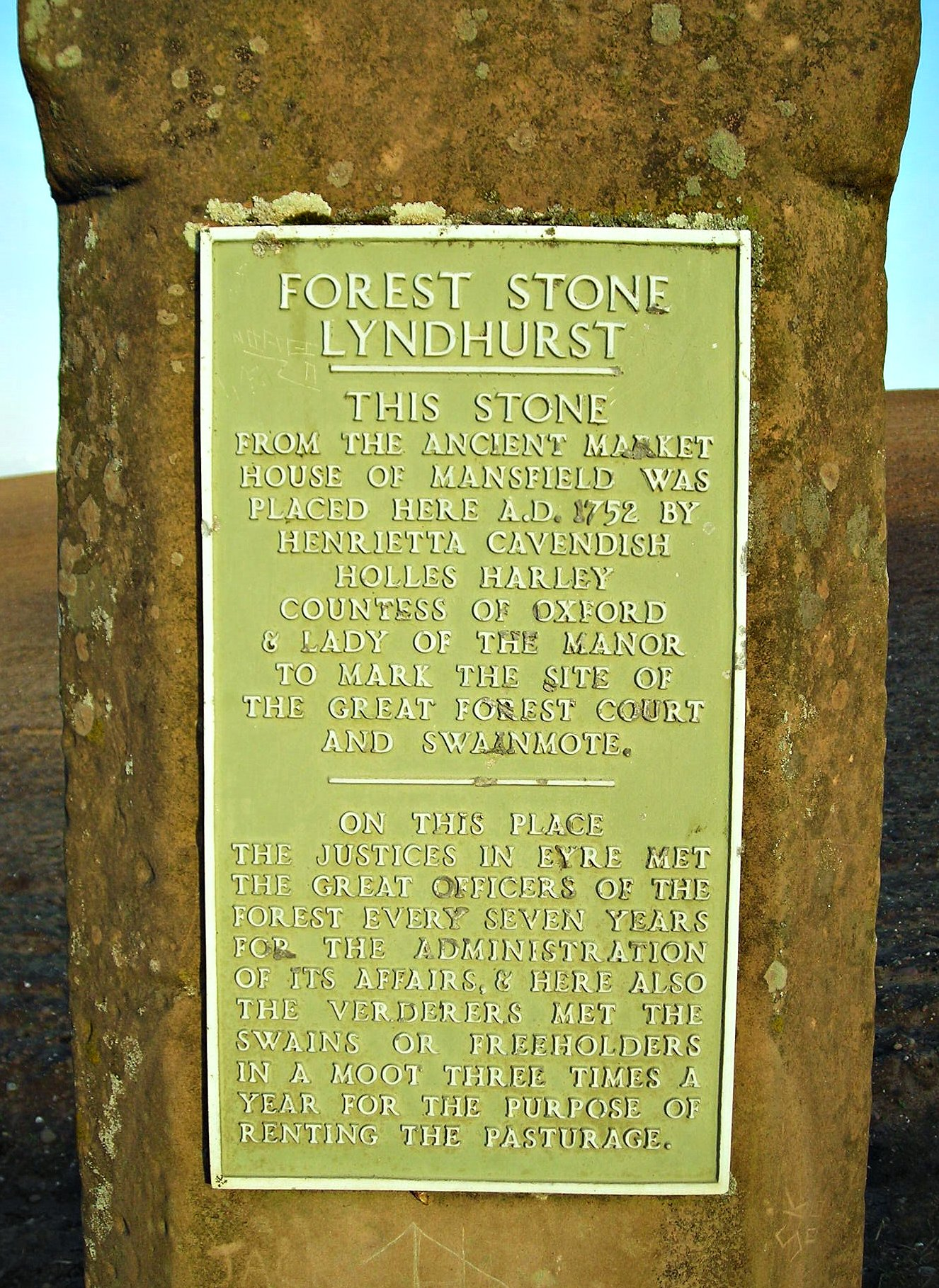
Plaque on Forest Stone, Black Scotch Lane

== Geography ==
Lindhurst parish is predominantly rural and roughly diamond shaped. The only paved route is the country lane Blidworth Road bypassing Rainworth in the east of the parish. The hamlet and other features are accessed via paths, tracks and bridleways.

The western end contains a portion of Harlow Wood, while the centre holds a small cluster of farmhouses, agricultural facilities along with a livery yard business and has the highest point in the parish at 155 metres (509 ft). It is bounded to the south with the Rainworth Water stream which flows into several ponds and lakes, and at the north by the Foulevil Brook, both of which flow into the 'L Lake' at the eastern corner, so named due to its shape.

Lindhurst abuts to its western edge the Harlow Wood village community in Ashfield, a small boundary of the Ravenshead parish in Gedling borough to the south, Blidworth is also south and Rainworth to the east. The Forest Stone, a listed monument along the north boundary, commemorates a medieval forest court.

Lindhurst Wind Farm has 5 turbines providing up to 9MW of power, and at 125 metres (410 ft) in height is visible for several miles around. One of the turbines, as well as the lower half of the parish lay within the Nottingham green belt boundary.

== History ==
=== Toponymy ===
The area was known originally as Lyndhurst Wood. The name meant ‘lime-tree hill’ suggesting lime trees were dominant in the area.

=== Heritage ===
Lyndhurst Wood, as the area was known originally had the status of the ‘chief wood of Sherwood' and anciently was part of Harlow Wood. Although lime trees were originally dominant in this area, by medieval times it mainly held oak trees, and these were used to repair Nottingham Castle between 1358 and 1368. The area also has a link to the Robin Hood legend, the site of an ancient moat across from Fountain Dale is alternatively called 'Friar Tuck Island' and is supposed to be where the two met and the friar was challenged to carry the outlaw over, but with Tuck eventually throwing him in. The moat was also the site of a toll house and medieval hunting lodge, and presently is listed as a scheduled monument.

Lindhurst was owned by The Crown, but in the 18th century, the area was claimed by the Duke of Portland as part of his existing holdings, the land was enclosed and a new hunting lodge was built c.1760. When the disputed area was followed up by government commissioners appointed to look at land ownership, the Duke maintained his right to the area, and this appears to not have been thoroughly investigated and possibly forgotten, or that a little documented sale agreement was eventually made. Later on, it was cleared and turned into farmland with the Rainworth Water dammed and the resulting ponds used as irrigation. The lodge was repurposed into Lyndhurst Farm, which is how it remains to this day.
