= Bilsthorpe Moor =

Hamlet in Nottinghamshire, England

Coordinates: 53°08′N 1°02′W

- Location within Nottinghamshire
- OS grid reference: SK 65136 59685
- Civil parish: Bilsthorpe
- District: Newark and Sherwood
- Shire county: Nottinghamshire
- Region: East Midlands
- Country: England
- Sovereign state: United Kingdom
- Post town: Newark
- Postcode district: NG22
- Dialling code: 01623
- Police: Nottinghamshire
- Fire: Nottinghamshire
- Ambulance: East Midlands
- UK Parliament: Sherwood

Bilsthorpe Moor is a hamlet in the civil parish of Bilsthorpe, in the Newark and Sherwood district of Nottinghamshire, England. It is 120 miles north of London, 13 miles north east of the city of Nottingham, five miles south of Ollerton and close to the junction of the A614 and A617 roads.

Map

== Toponymy ==
According to local placename studies the name "Bilsthorpe" means 'The þorp (village) of Bildr', also known in the form, Bildi. No knowledge of either person exists, although in Old Norse Bíldr meant 'axe' and was also commonly the name of a mythical Norse dwarf of tales. The moor portion of the placename refers to the settlement's development on elevated moorland, which rises to over 300ft.

== Geography ==
Bilsthorpe Moor is surrounded by the following local areas:

- Bilsthorpe village to the north
- Farnsfield to the south
- Eakring and Kirklington to the east
- Mansfield and Rainworth to the west.

This area lies to the southeast corner of the parish, where Kirklington Road meets Farnsfield Road. It is a suburb of Bilsthorpe village, and primarily residential, lying 1/3 mile (600 m) south of the traditional centre close to the church, and 3/4 mi (1.22 kilometres) from the newer village area. It also refers to the wider location south of built-up area, for which there are open fields to the east, west and south which is predominantly used as farmland, with some light and medium industry.

Around the built-up area, the land is approximately 70–75 metres (230–246 ft) with a nearby high point of 83 metres (272 ft) south of the village. The land peaks at 95 metres (312 ft) in the south west.

== Governance and demography ==
The parish level is managed by Bilsthorpe Parish Council. At this level, since the two settlements of Bilsthorpe village and Bilsthorpe Moor hamlet now effectively run into one another, Bilsthorpe is treated as one unified area together with its wider countryside. This parish currently reports a population of 3,375 residents.

The district level is managed by Newark and Sherwood District Council. The highest level 'strategic' services to the area are provided by Nottinghamshire County Council.

At the Parliamentary level, the residents elect an MP to serve in the House of Commons seat for Sherwood Forest. As of June 2024, the elected MP represents the Conservative Party.

== History ==
In 1066 during the time of the Norman Conquest, Ulf was recorded as local lord and landowner. By the time of Domesday (1086), Gilbert of Ghent was the primary landowner. Much of the surrounding area came into the ownership by the sixteenth century of Sir Brian Broughton, first in the line of Broughton baronets. It was later transferred to the Earl of Scarborough by the middle of the 19th century, who was recorded as Lord of the manor in 1853 as well as owner of all the parish land, except the glebe land associated to the village church. Bilsthorpe Moor was first recorded in 1840 within a tithe map as a discrete place.

Maps at the turn of the 20th century showed a cluster of residences as well as a small pool, the Sow Dam (by the modern day Oaktree Drive) as the northern extent of the hamlet, with some greenfield land before Bilsthorpe village. This gap began to be built over from the late 1950s into the 1970s mainly with housing, mirroring the building of miner's homes taking place in the main village, with a small retail area put in place along this section of Kirkington Road. The railway line to Bilsthorpe colliery ran to the left of the village, and was in use for transporting coal from the middle 1920s until 1997.

There was a school in the area for much of the 20th century. By the middle of the 1950s there was a medium-sized farm to the north east of the village, eventually becoming a factory for poultry products owned by Deans Foods, which was later bought out by the Noble Foods Group. It was closed in 2016, with production moved elsewhere in the country, and the facility subsequently demolished. The owners then made proposals to build houses on the site. Wicker (later Wycar) Leys was a large farmhouse on the southwest of the area, which was owned by the Rufford Abbey estate until 1938 when much of their local holdings were sold. It was later repurposed as a nursing home for disabled patients until the parent business closed the site in 2019.

== Economy ==
While much of the area surrounding the residential settlement is agricultural with nearby farms working the land, there is other industry locally based to the south of the village:

- Belle Eau Park is an industrial estate for small and medium businesses, with a small portion within the moor area.
- There is a wood manufacturer providing business furnishings.
- A solar farm is to the south west, feeding generated electricity into the national grid.

== Landmarks ==
- The Southwell Trail reuses the former railway trackbed to the Bilsthorpe colliery as a medium distance path.
- An activity centre is close to the junction of the A614 and A617 roads.
