= Bilsthorpe Colliery =

Coal mine in Nottinghamshire, England

- Location in Nottinghamshire
- Location: Nottinghamshire,, Nottinghamshire, England; 53°08′43″N 1°01′16″W
- Products: Coal
- Opened: 1927
- Closed: 1997
- Company: RJB Mining, British Coal

Bilsthorpe Colliery was a colliery in north Nottinghamshire. From when work started in 1925 to the pits closure in 1997, 77 people died at the pit.

== History ==
The pit began in July 1925 with two shafts. The mine was completed in 1928.

On 1 March 1927, fourteen miners were killed. On 26 July 1934, nine miners were killed.

=== 1993 disaster ===
On 18 August 1993, a roof collapsed killing 26-year old Bill McCulloch (from Rainworth), 50-year-old Peter Alcock and an under-manager, 31-year-old David Shelton (from Blyth). A team from the Mansfield-based Mines Rescue Service searched for survivors.

A 1994 report was produced by the HM Inspectorate of Mines. The disaster was caused by unsafe roof bolting.

=== Closure ===
It closed in 1997. A memorial was unveiled in October 2011.

The site is now Bilsthorpe Business park. A new energy centre is planned.

== Ownership ==
On 1 January 1947 it was taken over by the National Coal Board. From 1986 it was run by British Coal.
