= Bilsthorpe =

Village and civil parish in Nottinghamshire, England

Coordinates: 53°08′N 1°02′W

- Village and civil parish
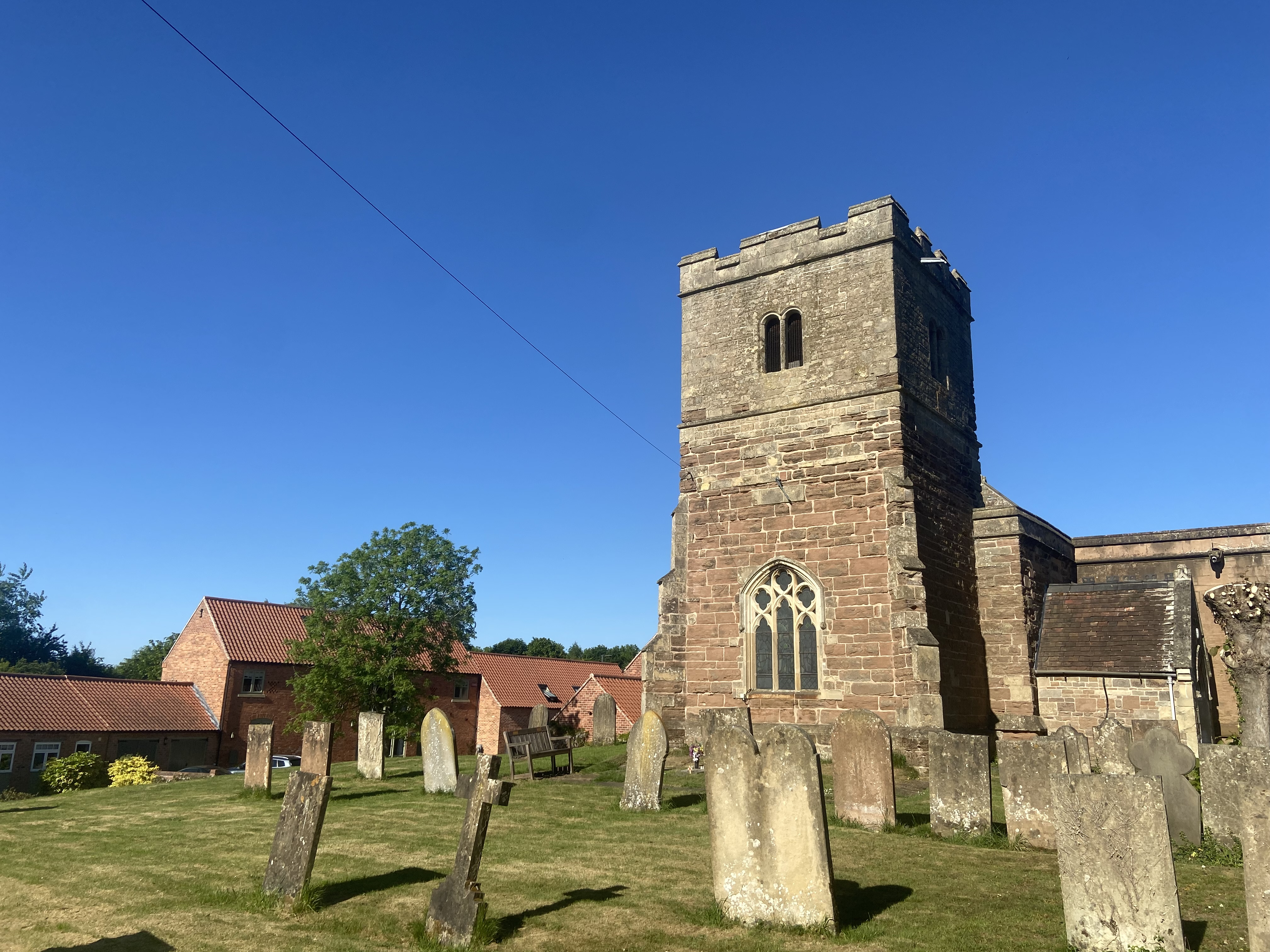
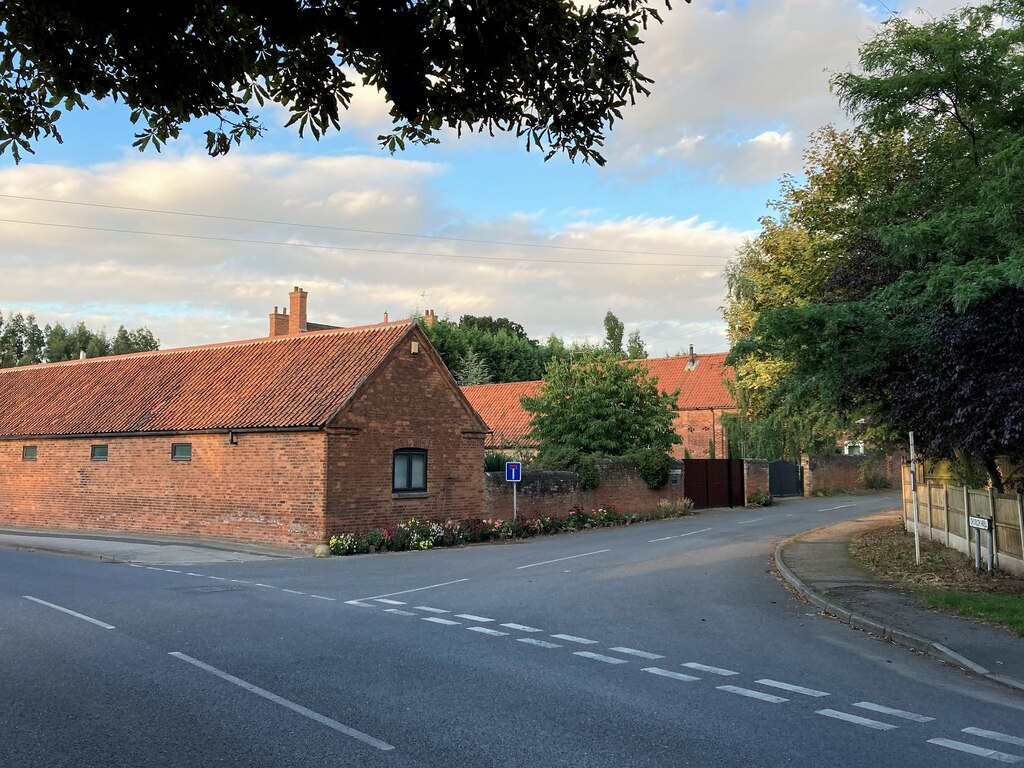
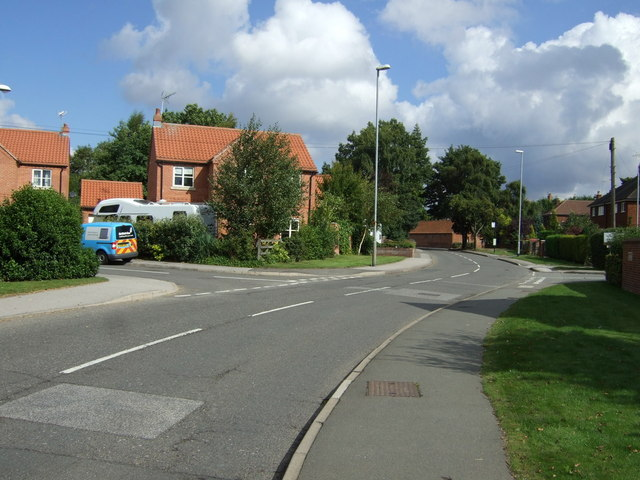
- St Margaret's Church Rectory Barn Kirklington Road

- Location within Nottinghamshire
- Interactive map of Bilsthorpe
- Area: 2.46 sq mi (6.4 km^{2})
- Population: 3,365 (2021)
  - Density: 1,368/sq mi (528/km^{2})
- OS grid reference: SK 644607
  - London: 115 mi (185 km) SSE
- District: Newark and Sherwood
- Shire county: Nottinghamshire
- Region: East Midlands
- Country: England
- Sovereign state: United Kingdom
- Settlements: Bilsthorpe; Bilsthorpe Moor
- Post town: Newark
- Postcode district: NG22
- Dialling code: 01623
- Police: Nottinghamshire
- Fire: Nottinghamshire
- Ambulance: East Midlands
- UK Parliament: Sherwood
- Website: www.hugofox.com/community/bilsthorpe-parish-council-13751/home

Bilsthorpe is a village and civil parish in the Newark and Sherwood district of Nottinghamshire, England. According to the 2001 census it had a population of 3,076, increasing to 3,375 at the 2011 census, and dropping slightly to 3,365 at the 2021 census. It is located near the junction of the A614 and A617, around five miles south of Ollerton, nine miles east of Mansfield and six miles north-west of Southwell.

== History ==
=== Etymology ===
There was originally a ‘d’ in Bilsthorpe’s name. The thorpe being a Scandinavian invader named Bildr who is believed to have founded the village before the Saxons and Danes. Bilsthorpe was mentioned in the Domesday Book in 1086 as ‘Bildesthorp’.

=== Industrial Revolution ===
The village's colliery closed in 1997 after 70 years in use. The colliery was the centre of national media and public attention on 18 August 1993 when a roof collapsed in the colliery, killing under-manager David Shelton and miners Bill McCulloch and Peter Alcock. David Shelton was posthumously awarded the George Medal for bravery on 11 October 1995 for aiding the rescue of other miners; survivor Ray Thompson also received the George Medal.

A memorial in the form of an 8 ft (2.4 m) miners lamp carved from sandstone bearing the names of 77 deceased workers dating back to 1927 was established in 2011.

A memorial to dead miners was also erected outside the colliery site.

== Facilities ==
The village has two children's play-parks as well as a small duck pond. It is the northern terminus of the Southwell Trail. It has also a members-only fishing lake created from the remains of the old colliery slag heap.

The village is known locally as being two areas, the 'old' and 'new'. The village has two public houses, The Copper Beech which is located in the old village, and the Stanton Arms which is located in the new village. There is still a local miners' welfare club which is also in the new village. Bilsthorpe parish church is the Grade I listed St Margaret's Church.

Bilsthorpe Moor is to the south of the village. It previously housed a supported-living home, LifeWays, for adults with learning disabilities and autism, which closed in 2019.

Bilsthorpe Flying High Academy is the local education facility for children with access to nursery and primary learning. Part of The Flying High Trust, a multi-school organisation based in Cotgrave, Nottinghamshire, it opened for the autumn term 2015 and was previously known as Crompton View Primary School.

There are three local comprehensive schools, the Joseph Whitaker School in Rainworth, Dukeries Academy in Ollerton and the Minster School, Southwell.

The village is home to the Bilsthorpe heritage museum, which is located in the new village.

== Sport ==
Bilsthorpe Welfare Youth Football Club won the Mansfield Youth Under 16s Division 2 football championship. BWYFC Bilsthorpe is also the home of non-league football club Nottingham United, one of the biggest semi-professional clubs in the county, currently playing at Step 7 of the National League System and based at Bilsthorpe Sports Ground on Eakring Road. NUFC

English footballer Mark Monington was born in Bilsthorpe.

== Transport ==
Stagecoach EastMidlands operates several bus routes in the area, including:

- The Sherwood Arrow which links Bilsthorpe with Nottingham, Ollerton, Worksop and Retford
- 27X and 28B to Mansfield and Eakring.

The nearest National Rail station is at Mansfield, for East Midlands Railway services to Nottingham.

The Southwell Trail is a shared-use path, which reuses the former railway trackbed to Bilsthorpe Colliery to link the village with Southwell.

== See also ==
- Listed buildings in Bilsthorpe
