= Listed buildings in Ravenshead =

Ravenshead is a civil parish in the Gedling district of Nottinghamshire, England. The parish contains eight listed buildings that are recorded in the National Heritage List for England. All the listed buildings are designated at Grade II, the lowest of the three grades, which is applied to "buildings of national importance and special interest". The parish includes the village of Ravenshead and the surrounding area. The listed buildings consist of a house, three boundary stones, and two lodges to Newstead Abbey and associated structures.

== Buildings ==
Name and location	Photograph	Date	Notes
Blidworth Dale; 53.07930°N 1.14487°W	—	Mid 18th century	The house was extended in 1835, and this part is in red brick on a painted plinth, with modillion eaves and a hipped slate roof. There are two storeys and three bays. In the centre is a porch with a parapet and decorative iron railings. The doorway has pilasters and a fanlight, the windows are sashes with moulded surrounds, and in the upper floor are initials and the date. The earlier wing to the rear left has three storeys and three bays. The ground floor is rendered, and the upper floors are tile hung. On the garden front is a canted bay window with a floor band and a parapet.
Boundary Stone North of Papplewick Pumping Station Reservoir; 53.06507°N 1.14414°W		1757	The boundary stone has a square plan and a pyramidal cap. The date and an initial are inscribed on the south front.
Boundary Stone North of Papplewick Pumping Station; 53.06390°N 1.13061°W	—	1757	The boundary stone has a square plan and a pyramidal cap. It is thought that the date and an initial are inscribed on the south front.
Boundary Stone North of Howe Plantation Obelisk; 53.06549°N 1.15266°W	—	1757	The boundary stone is in sandstone, and has a square plan and a pyramidal cap. The date and an initial are inscribed on the south front, and there is an initial on the north front.
East Lodge, Newstead Abbey; 53.08505°N 1.17177°W		1862	The lodge, designed by C. A. Buckler, is in stone on a chamfered plinth, and has a tile roof with coped gables, kneelers and finials. There is a single storey, a cruciform plan, and three bays. The windows are lancets with pointed or ogee heads, and most have hood moulds. The south front has a projecting gable and a square bay window, over which is a traceried frieze and a datestone with a coat of arms. To the right is a doorway with a four-centred arched head. There are bay windows on the east and west sides.
Gates, gate piers and walls, East Drive, Newstead Abbey; 53.08502°N 1.17159°W		1862	The buildings were designed by C. A. Buckler and are in stone. Flanking the entrance are octagonal gate piers with plinths and traceried ogee caps and spearhead gates, Outside these are smaller gates in four-centred arched openings, and similar corner piers. The flanking walls enclosing the grounds have moulded and ramped coping, and extend for about 200 metres (660 ft).
South Lodge, gate and wall, Newstead Abbey; 53.07282°N 1.18428°W		1862	The buildings were designed by C. A. Buckler. The lodge, later a private house, is in sandstone on a chamfered plinth, with quoins, and a tile roof with carved bargeboards. There is a single storey and an attic, and three bays. In the centre is a wooden gabled porch, flanked by two-light mullioned windows with four-centred arched heads, and above is a dormer. Outside, is a dwarf wall with spearhead railings and a gate. To the south are double gates and a wicket gate with spearhead railings, and square piers with pyramidal tops.
St Peter's Church; 53.08665°N 1.16905°W		1972	The church is in dark and pale brick, and has a timber hyperbolic paraboloid roof supported on circular columns, coated with a rubber based material with a metallic reflective coating. On the south front is a cantilevered tangential protrusion, which holds a dalle de verre window.
