= Ravenshead =

Village and civil parish in Nottinghamshire, England

- Village and civil parish
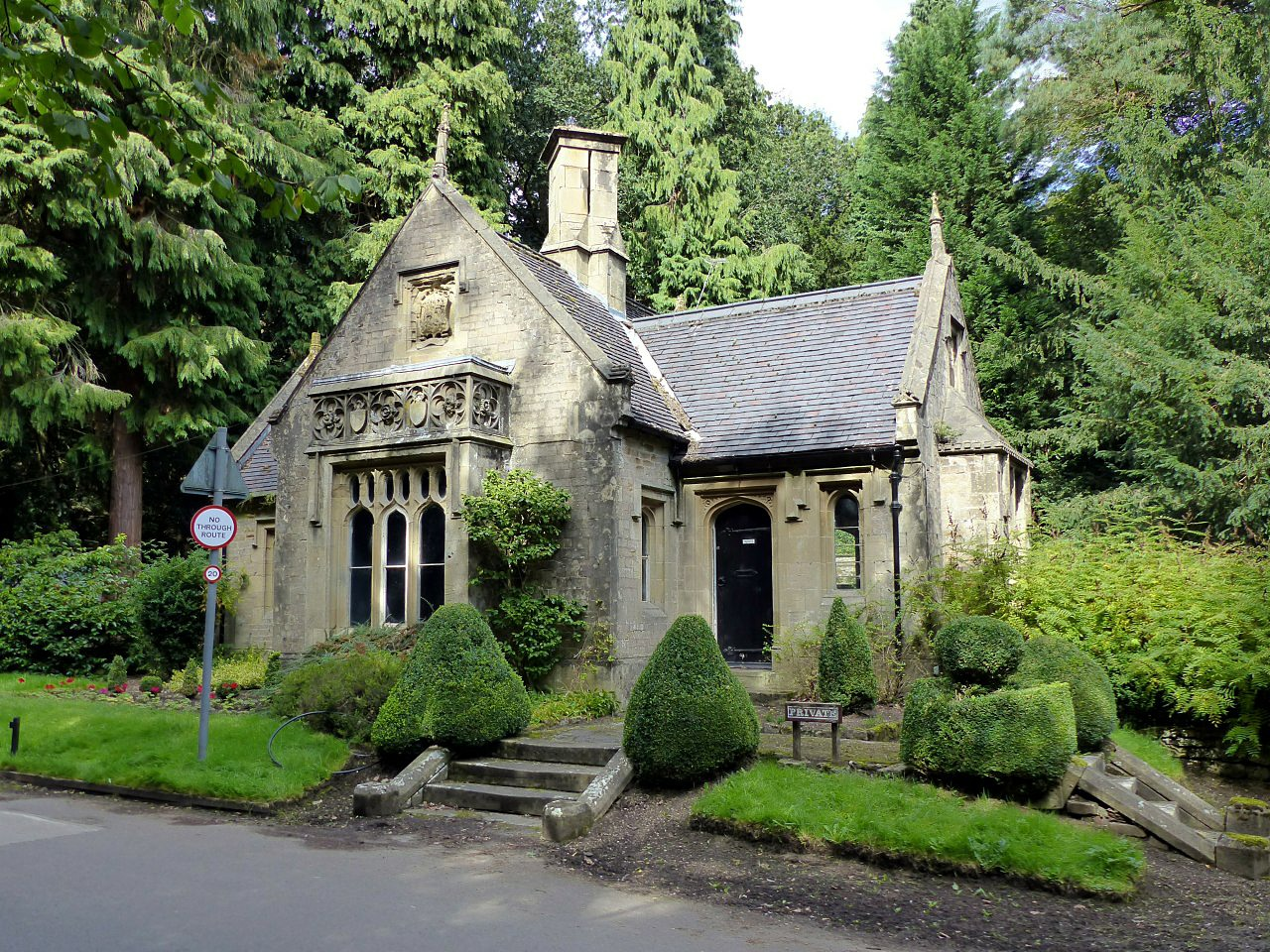
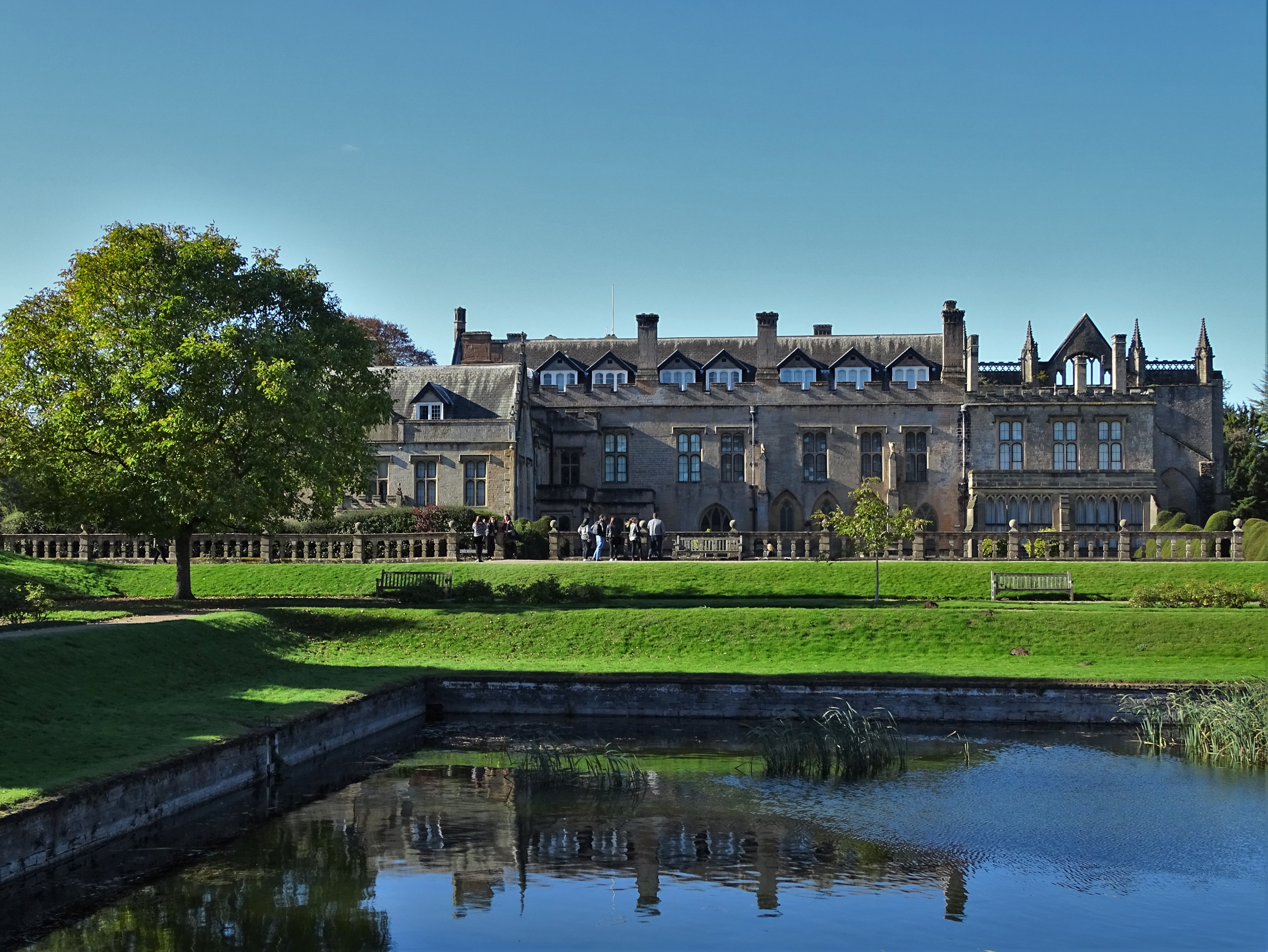
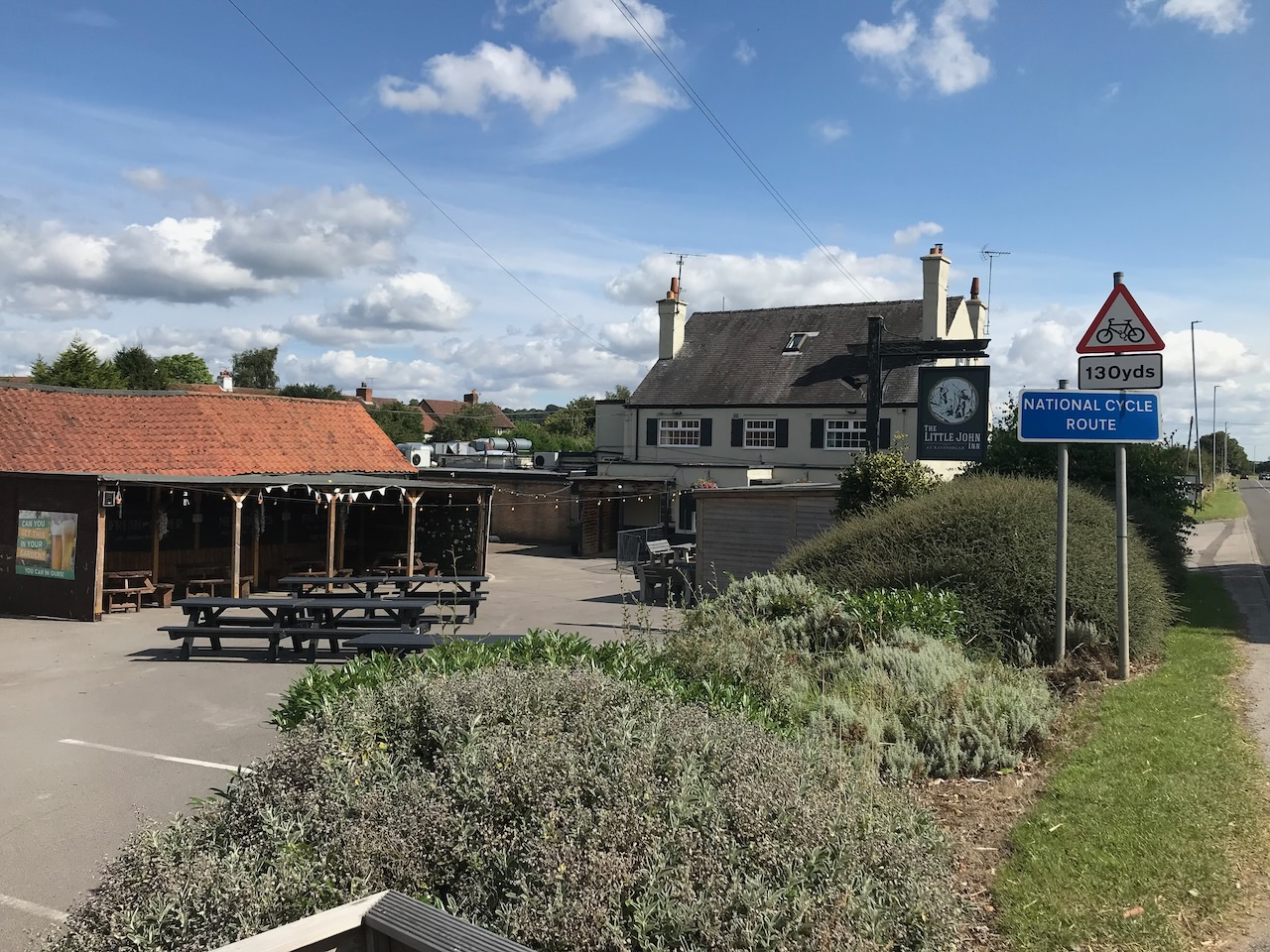
- East Lodge Newstead Abbey Little John Inn

- Location within Nottinghamshire
- Interactive map of Ravenshead
- Area: 5.51 sq mi (14.3 km^{2})
- Population: 5,891 (2021 Census)
  - Density: 1,069/sq mi (413/km^{2})
- OS grid reference: SK 560546
  - London: 115 mi (185 km) SSE
- District: Borough of Gedling
- Shire county: Nottinghamshire
- Region: East Midlands
- Country: England
- Sovereign state: United Kingdom
- Post town: NOTTINGHAM
- Postcode district: NG15
- Dialling code: 01623
- Police: Nottinghamshire
- Fire: Nottinghamshire
- Ambulance: East Midlands
- UK Parliament: Sherwood
- Website: www.ravensheadpc.org.uk

Ravenshead is a large village and civil parish in the Gedling district of Nottinghamshire, England. It borders Papplewick, Newstead Abbey and Blidworth, and is part of Nottinghamshire's Hidden Valleys area. According to the 2001 census, it had a population of 5,636, reducing marginally to 5,629 at the 2011 census, but increased to 5,891 at the 2021 census.

The area was previously known as Fishpool.

== History ==
Newstead Abbey, a 12th-century Grade I listed building and ancestral home of Lord Byron, although in Newstead parish, is accessed from Ravenshead. After the death of Thomas Becket, King Henry II supposedly, to make up for this terrible deed, gave the Canons of the Order of St Augustine the land at Ravenshead, where they set up a priory, the walls of which can still be seen today. It is here that the name Ravenshead is first encountered. "Ravenshede begins at the aforesaidway which lies from Papilwyke [Papplewick] to Blydeworthe, along the hollowroad eastward which is called Thefestyghe: and this leads to the King's highway which is called Nottinghamgate."

In the Middle Ages, the priory was a stopping place for pilgrims.

In 1349, the prior died of plague. The soil in the area is very sandy and unsuitable for growing crops. There is no evidence of a settlement in the area until the 15th century, when there was a hunting lodge called Langton Arbor, near present-day Blidworth Dale.

The legend of Robin Hood centres on the area of Sherwood Forest in which Ravenshead is located. Although a later addition to the legend, it is possible that one of Robin Hood's followers, Friar Tuck, was inspired by the priory. Will Scarlet is also supposed to be buried at nearby Blidworth Church.

In 1966, a hoard of gold coins and jewellery was discovered by workmen on a building site near present-day Cambourne Gardens. The coins were probably buried by someone fleeing south after the Battle of Hexham in May 1464. The "Fishpool Hoard", as it is known, is on display at The British Museum, London. Fishpool, Notts, is the name of the area where they were found, as the building site did not have the name Ravenshead then (see below).

On 17 July 1817, a young girl from Papplewick named Elizabeth Sheppard travelled to Mansfield in search of work. Early the next morning, her body was found in a ditch. The "Sheppard Stone" stands next to the A60, marking the spot on the roadside below Portland College and is still regularly maintained. Her ghost is said to appear if the stone is disturbed. Her killer was identified as Charles Rotherham, from Sheffield, who had tried to sell her newly bought shoes and an umbrella.

In nearby Thieves Wood, on 23 June 1883, gamekeeper Albert Spinks shot the first example of an Egyptian nightjar in England. He mentioned it to Joseph Whitaker, a naturalist, who recognised it as a rare bird species in Britain. He had the bird stuffed, and it is now kept in a museum in nearby Mansfield. No further examples were seen in Britain until 1984.

100 years ago, Ravenshead was centred on an area called Fishpool, this name appeared on a 15th-century map.

Most of Ravenshead parish was in the parish of Blidworth in the Newark and Sherwood district of Nottinghamshire prior to 1987, with part coming from the parish of Newstead, already in Gedling.

== Schools ==
The village has two primary (infant) schools, while the secondary school most commonly attended by pupils from Ravenshead is Joseph Whitaker School in the neighbouring village of Rainworth.

=== Abbey Gates Primary School ===
Abbey Gates Primary School, founded in 1967, is a mixed primary school in Ravenshead, which serves mainly the local village community, with about a third of the pupils coming from farther away.

The attainment of pupils on entry to the school is in line with that expected nationally for children of this age. The Foundation Unit is recognised as a centre of excellence. (Ofsted, 2006)

In 2006, Darren Powell, a teacher at Abbey Gates, produced a short film featuring members of his class titled "Body Image for Beginners," which was shown on Teacher's TV.

=== Ravenshead C of E Primary School ===
Ravenshead C of E Primary School was formed in September 1999 from an amalgamation of Pilgrim Oak County Infants' School and Martin Roe C of E (Controlled) Junior School. It is located on Swinton Rise, in Ravenshead, Nottinghamshire. In the Ofsted report of 2006, the school was categorised as "outstanding".

== Amenities ==
In the centre of the village, there are also several shops, including a newsagent, chemist, a fish and chip, a café, a shop and a Chinese takeaway.

The village has a petrol station, pubs, convenience stores and a large leisure centre with tennis courts and football pitches, but no swimming pool.

== Residents ==
Ravenshead has a diverse population of professional people, elderly people and skilled workers. It also serves as a commuter village to Nottingham.

Farming was the main occupation in the area until the arrival of the local shops and schools. The only other industry in Ravenshead was sand quarrying. The first quarry was opened in 1919 to provide building sand for Nottingham and Hucknall.

== See also ==
- Listed buildings in Ravenshead
