= Dawn House School =

Special school in Rainworth, Nottinghamshire, England

Location
- Helmsley Road; Rainworth, NG21 0DQ; United Kingdom; 53.12778°N 1.13333°W

Information
- Established: 1974
- Specialist: Speech and Language Difficulties
- Department for Education URN: 122956 Tables
- Principal: Jenny McConnell
- Deputy Principal: Mary Kirby
- Gender: Mixed
- Age: 5 to 19
- Enrolment: 70
- Colours: Blue,
- Website: http://www.dawnhouseschool.org.uk/

Dawn House School (commonly referred to as Dawn House) is a specialist school run by the charity Speech and Language UK for children with severe or complex speech and language challenges. It is located in Rainworth, Nottinghamshire in the United Kingdom.

It is a mixed school accommodating both residential and day pupils from ages of 5–19 years old.

== History ==
Dawn House was opened by the charity I CAN (now operating as Speech and Language UK) in 1974 to support children aged 5–11 years old with speech and language disorders. In 1988, the school opened a secondary department to accommodate for children between the ages of 11–16 years old. In 2006, Dawn House opened a further education department for sixth form students.

== Specialisms ==
Children with developmental speech and/or language disorder as their main barrier to learning can apply. Pupils are referred when they have severe and complex needs, which cannot be met in local mainstream schools, units for pupils with language impairments or other special schools.

Dawn House is also able cater for a number of other difficulties that are typically associated with speech and language challenges. These include: learning difficulties, behavioural modulation, problems with attention and memory, motor dyspraxia, sensory difficulties, autistic spectrum difficulties, emotional problems, difficulties with friendships and social relationships, poor self-image and low self-esteem.

== School ==
Dawn House has 96 places for boys and girls aged between 5–19 years old and has a mixture of day pupils and residential students that board on a weekly basis. The school has a range of on-site facilities including an art and design technology suite, a drama studio, ICT suites, a sports hall, indoor heated swimming pool and outdoor playing fields. The school has maintained an 'Outstanding' Ofsted rating since 2015.
