= Listed buildings in Bilsthorpe =

Bilsthorpe is a civil parish in the Newark and Sherwood district of Nottinghamshire, England. The parish contains four listed buildings that are recorded in the National Heritage List for England. Of these, one is listed at Grade I, the highest of the three grades, and the others are at Grade II, the lowest grade. The parish contains the village of Bilsthorpe and the surrounding countryside, and the listed buildings consist of a church with associated features, a house and a farmhouse.

== Key ==
Grade	Criteria
I	Buildings of exceptional interest, sometimes considered to be internationally important
II	Buildings of national importance and special interest

== Buildings ==
Name and location	Photograph	Date	Notes	Grade
St Margaret's Church; 53.13549°N 1.02308°W		13th century	The church has been altered and extended through the centuries, it was restored in 1973 by T. C. Hine, and in 1879 the south chapel was added and the east window was replaced by Robert Edis. The church is built in stone with tile roofs, and consists of a nave, a south porch, a south transept, a chancel with a vestry, and a west tower. The tower has two stages, a chamfered plinth, diagonal buttresses, a string course, a triple lancet window in the lower stage, paired round-headed bell openings and an inscribed tablet in the upper stage, and an embattled parapet.	I
Manor Farm House; 53.13543°N 1.02378°W	—	17th century	The farmhouse is timber framed and in brick, partly rendered, with a pantile roof. There are two storeys and attics, five unequal bays and a rear outshut, and to the right is a lower two-story two-bay service wing. On the front is a flat-roofed brick porch with moulded eaves, and the windows are casements, some with segmental heads.	II
56 Kirklington Road; 53.13342°N 1.02767°W	—	c. 1720	The house is in brick on a plinth, with cogged eaves and a pantile roof. There are two storeys and two bays, and a small gabled extension to the right with a single storey and a single bay. On the front are two doorways, one blocked, sash windows in the main part, and a casement window in the extension, and above are two gabled dormers.	II
Boundary wall and steps, St Margaret's Church; 53.13528°N 1.02355°W		19th century	At the southwest corner of the churchyard is a flight of steps, flanked by stone walls with rounded coping, which extend to enclose the churchyard. The walls extend for about 175 metres (574 ft), and on the south side contain a pair of round-headed chamfered gate piers.	II
