= Lindhurst Wind Farm =

Wind farm in Lindhurst near Mansfield, England

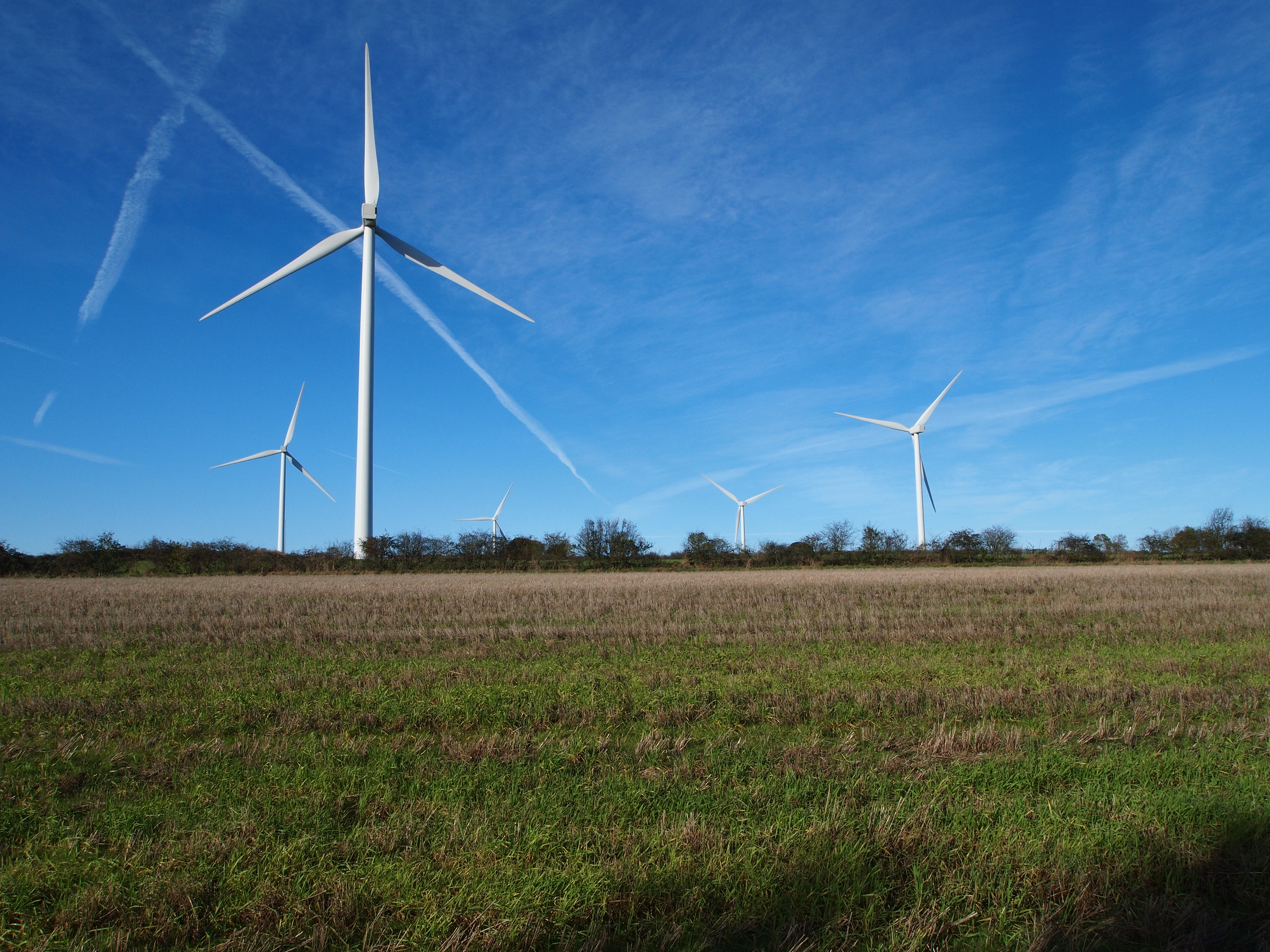
- Country: England, UK
- Location: Lindhurst, East Midlands, Nottinghamshire
- Coordinates: 53°06′58″N 01°08′48″W
- Status: Operational
- Commission date: 10 September 2010
- Owner: Npower Renewables

Wind farm
- Type: Onshore
- Hub height: 60 m (197 ft)
- Rotor diameter: 90 m
- Site elevation: 120 m

Power generation
- Units operational: Five
- Make and model: Vestas Wind Systems: Vestas V90
- Nameplate capacity: 9 MW

Lindhurst Wind Farm is a power-producing wind farm in Lindhurst parish near Mansfield, England. Built for Npower Renewables, it produces electricity from five wind turbines. It has a total nameplate capacity of 9 MW of electricity, providing enough power to serve the average needs of 5,400 homes.

The turbines stand 125 metres (410 ft) high to the rotor tip, making them the tallest in Nottinghamshire.

== History ==
Lindhurst Wind Farm was approved by the local planning committee at Newark and Sherwood District Council in September 2007. Local councillors voted 8–3 in favour of the application, which had been recommended for approval by the council's planning officer and supported by 3,300 local residents petition of support.

Preparatory work for the site began in 2008, with the wind turbines being erected in August 2010. The turbines went live on 10 September 2010.

== See also ==
- Energy in the United Kingdom
