= Joseph Whitaker (naturalist) =

English naturalist (1850-1932)

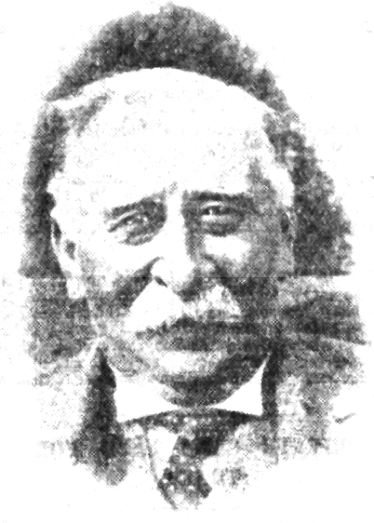
- Portrait of Joseph Whitaker
- Born: 12 July 1850; Arnold, Nottinghamshire, England
- Died: 27 May 1932 (aged 81); Rainworth, Nottinghamshire
- Known for: study of natural history and botany
- Spouse: Mary Edison
- Children: five

Joseph Whitaker, Esq., FZS (12 July 1850 – 27 May 1932) was an English naturalist who lived for most of his life at Rainworth, in Nottinghamshire, England. He was also a keen sportsman, botanist, fisherman and collected curios. He wrote several books, and some of his collection passed to the Mansfield Museum.

== Personal life ==
Whitaker was born at Ramsdale Farm, Arnold near Nottingham on 12 July 1850, the oldest son of another Joseph Whitaker. He received his education at Uppingham School, and loved the outdoors, a trait he learned from his father. For most of his life he lived at Rainworth Lodge, on Blidworth Lane at Rainworth. He married Mary Edison at Blidworth church on 16 April 1872, and they had five children. The first, Ethel Mary, died in infancy, while the fifth, Vera, married Sir Harold Bowden, 2nd Baronet, in 1908, but the marriage was short lived and they divorced in 1919. Among Whitaker's unusual traits was his habit of always walking on the road, and never on the pavement. He died on 27 May 1932 at Rainworth Lodge.

The Joseph Whitaker School in Rainworth was named after him.

== Professional life ==
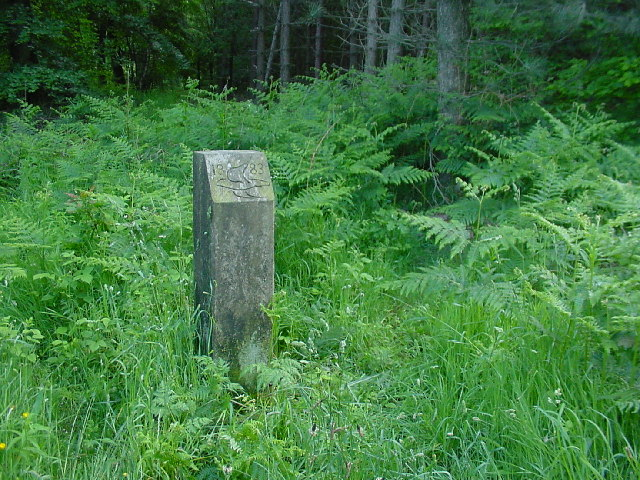
The replacement Bird Stone in Thieves Wood

Whitaker was a naturalist, and his home at Rainworth Lodge looked more like a museum, as it was full of cases of stuffed birds and other exhibits of natural life. One was an Egyptian nightjar, at the time the first known sighting of one in Britain, and only the second in Europe. It had been shot by a gamekeeper called Albert Spinks on 23 June 1883. Spinks knew of Whitaker's interest in birds, and having mentioned it, Whitaker retrieved the bird and had it stuffed. He erected a 'Bird Stone' to commemorate the event in Thieves Wood, to the west of Rainworth, but this was vandalised in the 1980s, and was replaced by a modern artifice. The nightjar, together with many other exhibits, was given to Mansfield Museum on his death. He became an authority on many kinds of wildlife, and especially British birds, although he was not averse to shooting them. On 10 October 1906 he and six others held a shooting party, which gained the record for the biggest bag in Nottinghamshire. The game killed that day included 1,504 partridges.

Whitaker was a keen botanist, fisherman and sportsman, and collected curios. He collected deer horns, aided by the fact that he had his own deer park, which he populated with Japanese deer. This was situated immediately to the south of his house, and is shown on the 1900 Ordnance Survey map, but not on the map from 1885/1891. In his own description of the park, Whitaker stated that it covered 22 acres (8.9 ha) and contained 21 fallow deer. Also in the enclosure were ten four-horned St Kilda sheep, three emus and two rheas.

As well as serving as a Justice of the Peace, he became a fellow of the Zoological Society of London, and vice-president of the Selborne Society. He also commissioned a window in Selborne church as a memorial to Revd. Gilbert White, a pioneer of birdwatching. The window has three lights, showing St Francis and a number of birds, all of which are mentioned in White's book The Natural History and Antiquities of Selborne. Whitaker wrote a number of books, including at least one volume of poems, and made contributions to the Victoria County History series of books. His collection included china, bric-a-brac, books and prints, and among the curios he amassed was possibly the first known circular saw, which was manufactured at the Barringer, Manners and Wallis factory in Rock Valley, Mansfield.

== Works ==
The following books written by Whitaker are listed in the British Library catalogue.

- Descriptive list of the Birds of Nottinghamshire. W. Gouk. 1879. (with W J Sterland)
- A Descriptive List of the Deer-Parks and Paddocks of England. London: Ballantyne, Hanson & Co. 1896. OCLC 6113552.
- Scribblings of a hedgerow naturalist. Walter Black. 1904.
- Notes on the Birds of Nottinghamshire. Walter Black. 1907.
- Nimrod, Ramrod, Fishing-Rod and Nature Tales. Henry B. Saxton. 1909.
- Jottings of a naturalist scraps of nature and sport on land and sea. Walter Black. 1912.
- British Duck Decoys of To-day, 1918, etc. Burlington Publishing. 1918.
- A Descriptive List of the Medieval Dovecotes in Nottinghamshire. Mansfield Reporter. 1927.

Whitaker also contributed to (scientific) journals, like for instance The Zoologist.

== Bibliography ==
- Mosley, Charles, ed. (2003). Burke's Peerage, Baronetage & Knightage (3 volumes) (107th ed.). Burke's Peerage (Genealogical Books). ISBN 978-0-9711966-2-9.
- Richards, W (1990). Blidworth in old picture postcards. Europese Bibliotheek. ISBN 978-90-288-3355-5.
- Shaw, Dr Tony (1998). Hidden Nottinghamshire. Sigma Leisure. ISBN 978-1-85058-624-1.
- Whitaker, Joseph (1896). A Descriptive List of the Deer-Parks and Paddocks of England. Ballantyne.
