= Rufford Colliery =

Defunct coal mine in Nottinghamshire, England

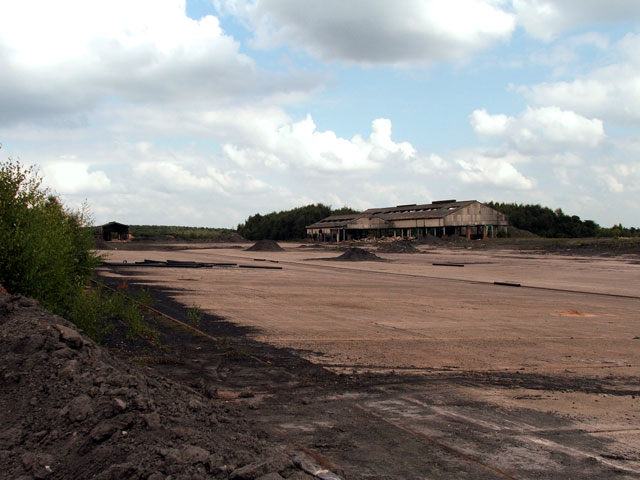
- Derelict buildings on old Rufford Colliery site, 2007
- Interactive map of Rufford Colliery
- Location: United Kingdom; 53.133°N 1.112°W
- Opened: 1911
- Active: 1911-1993
- Closed: 1993

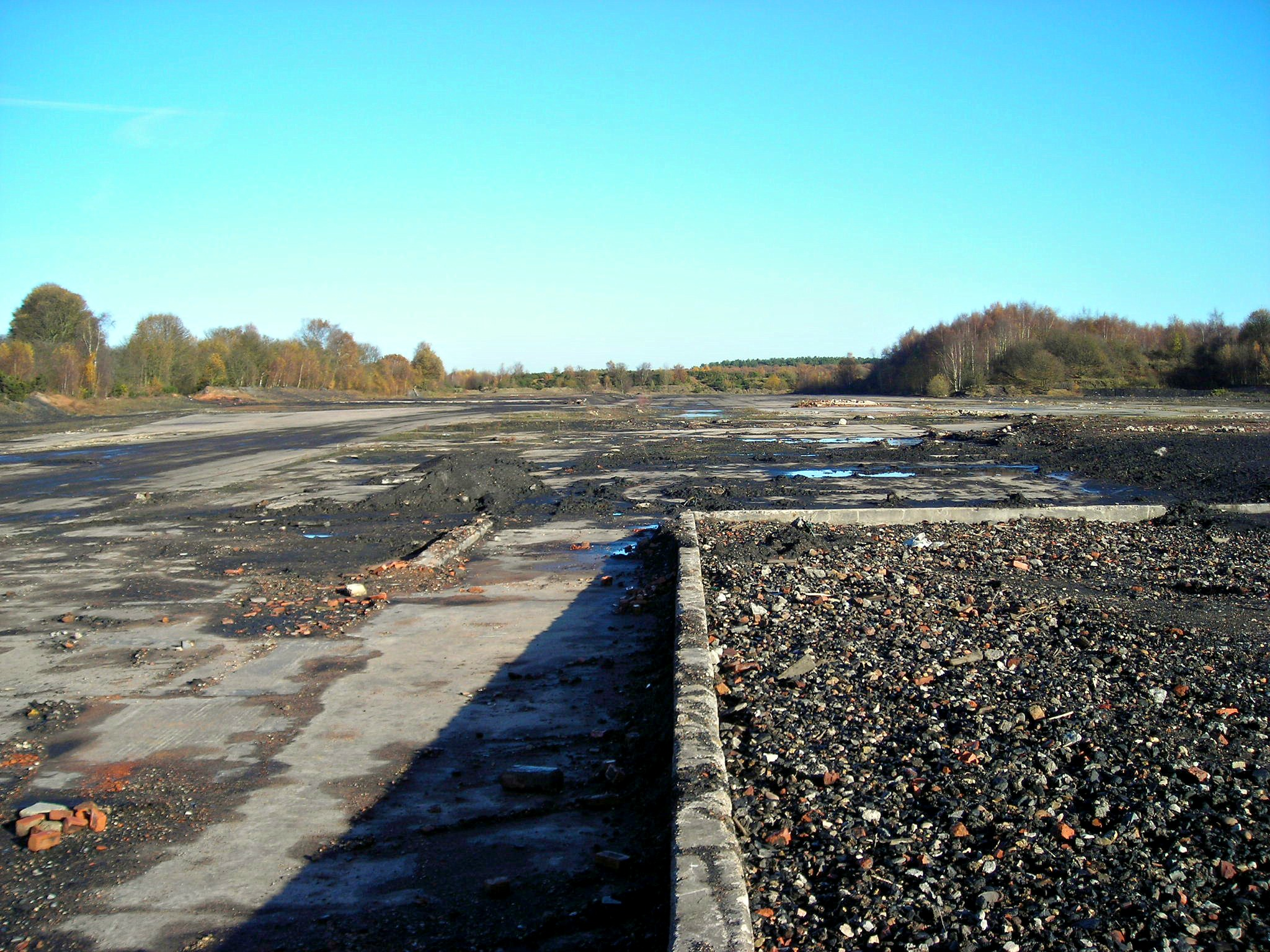
Cleared site in 2012

Rufford Colliery was a coal mine located near Rainworth, a village in Nottinghamshire, England. Its first shafts were sunk in 1911. In February 1913, fourteen workers at the mine died when a water barrel "containing some tons of water was precipitated down the shaft on to some men who were working at the bottom" of one of shafts. The mine was operated by Bolsover Colliery Company from 1915 to 1946, the National Coal Board from 1947 to 1987, and the British Coal Corporation from 1987 to 1993. The mine ceased operation in 1993.

== After mining ==
A waste incinerator to be built on the site of the former colliery was proposed in 2006 by Veolia Ltd., the preferred contractor for Nottinghamshire County Council. Previously, the Forest Town area of Mansfield was considered as a possible location. The Rufford proposal met with hostile views from many local residents, concerned with the environmental impact and the increased traffic around the village.

A planning permission application was made to Nottinghamshire County Council and to the Environment Agency, whose consultation ended in May 2008.

Opposition was from several local environmental groups, led by People Against Incineration (PAIN), who obtained the support of botanist David Bellamy.

The application was heard by Nottinghamshire County Council and they approved it despite heavy local opposition, but a public inquiry was put in place involving then-minister Eric Pickles. This inquiry sat in October 2009, only to be adjourned until April 2010 and yet again to September 2010, owing to the possibility of there being nationally important nesting sites for nightjars and woodlarks, among other disputed matters.

On 27 May 2011 the Secretary of State formally turned down the planning application.

Veolia then launched an appeal against the Secretary of State's decision but this was eventually withdrawn in October 2012.

The incinerator had been expected to process 180,000 tonnes (180,000 long tons; 200,000 short tons) a year, with the company claiming it had the potential to create electricity for heating, power and lighting for 15,000 homes and businesses.

The Harworth Group and the Nottinghamshire Wildlife Trust have worked together on restoration of the site. In 2021, Nottinghamshire County Council commenced a project to reclaim the land and plant trees on the site of the former colliery.

A small 9 MWh nickel manganese cobalt battery system, used for grid augmentation from 2018, caught fire in 2026 due to an internal fault.

== Natural amenity ==
Rainworth Heath is an adjacent, wider area of natural heathland overlying sandstone strata, known as Bunter, under improvement. It is one of the last remaining areas of heathland in Nottinghamshire, and has areas of both dry and wet heath.
