= Rainworth =

Village and civil parish in Nottinghamshire, England

Coordinates: 53.1197°N 1.1235°W

- Village and civil parish
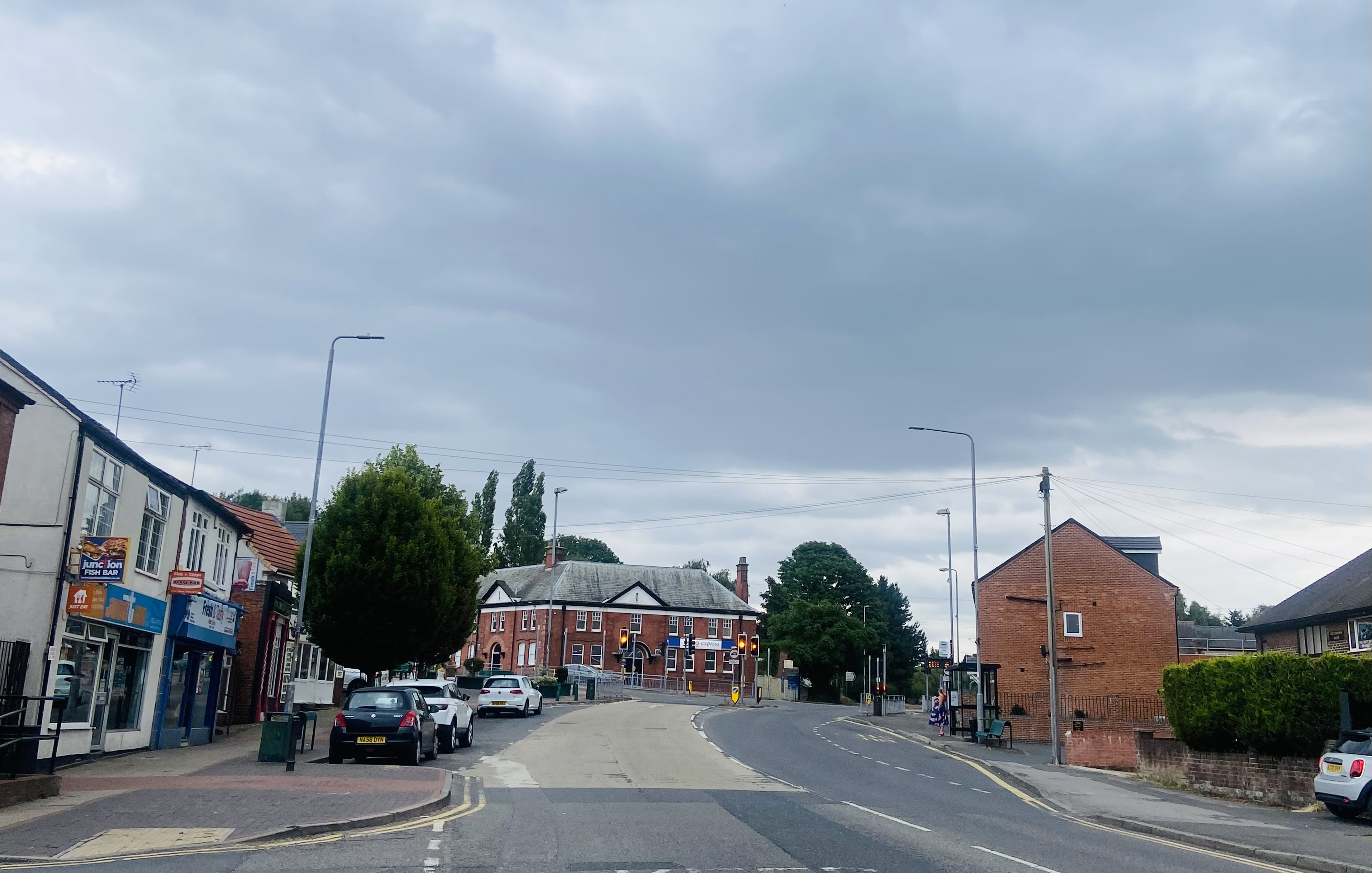
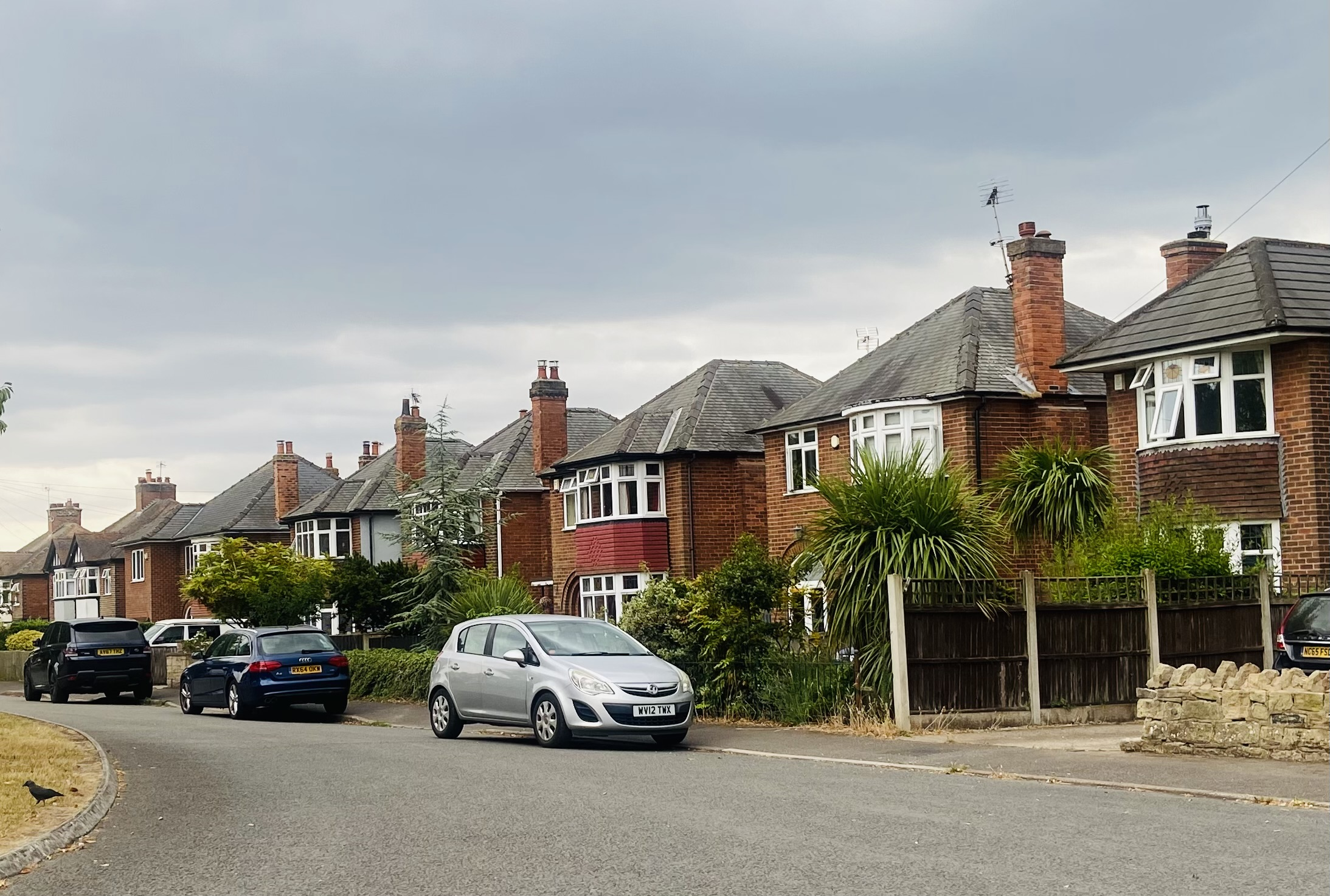
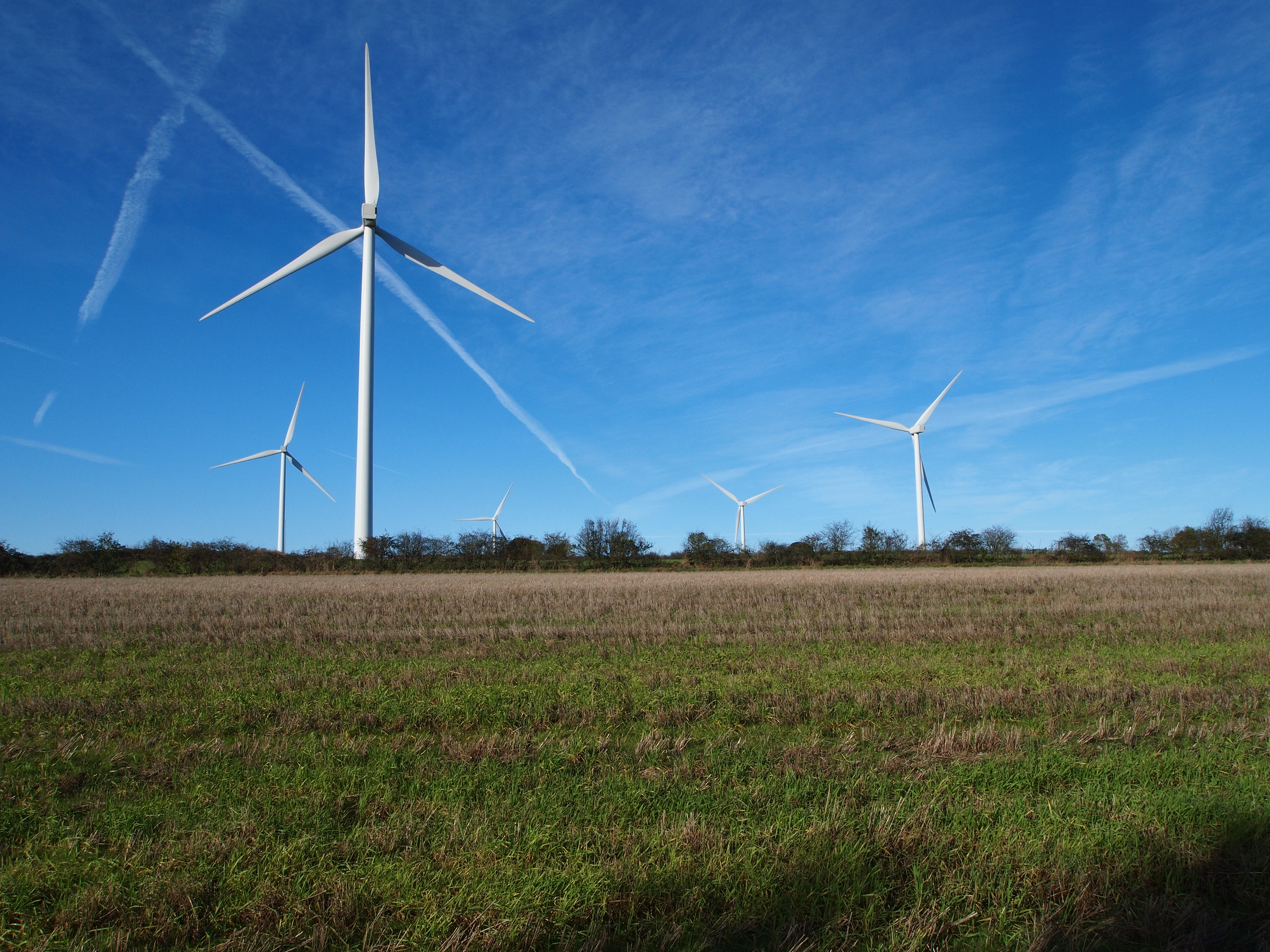
- Village Centre Southwell Road East Blidworth Lane

- Location within Nottinghamshire
- Interactive map of Rainworth
- Area: 3.24 sq mi (8.4 km^{2})
- Population: 7,058 (2021 - civil parish)
  - Density: 2,178/sq mi (841/km^{2})
- OS grid reference: SK 586584
  - London: 120 mi (190 km) SSE
- District: Newark and Sherwood & Mansfield
- Shire county: Nottinghamshire
- Region: East Midlands
- Country: England
- Sovereign state: United Kingdom
- Post town: MANSFIELD
- Postcode district: NG21
- Dialling code: 01623
- Police: Nottinghamshire
- Fire: Nottinghamshire
- Ambulance: East Midlands
- UK Parliament: Mansfield and Sherwood
- Website: www.rainworth-pc.gov.uk

Rainworth is a village in the ceremonial county of Nottinghamshire in the East Midlands of England. It is split between the local government districts of Newark and Sherwood and Mansfield. To the north of Rainworth is the village of Clipstone and to the east are the villages of Bilsthorpe and Farnsfield. Mansfield lies two miles (three kilometres) to the west and the village of Blidworth is one mile (one point five kilometres) to the south.

== Toponymy ==
The old Norse word for "clean" was hreinn with wath meaning ford.

Another theory is that c. 616 CE, the Saxon king of East Anglia, Rædwald, stayed at the site prior to Battle of the River Idle against Ethelfrith, King of Mercia. During the battle, Rædwald's son, Regehere, was slain, and from that day, the area was known as Regehere's Wath (Wath being a ford or crossing point over a river).

Over the years, many changes in the spelling of the name have been recorded, becoming Reynwath by 1268, then Raynwath, and further adapted to the present day name of Rainworth.

Locally, some pronounce the modern day spelling as "Renneth".

== History ==
Rainworth started as a settlement close to a Roman road that went through Mansfield and Newark, and provided access to the coalfields of Derbyshire for the Roman settlements in the area to the east of Nottinghamshire. The sheltered location and access to clean water from Rainworth Water, meant that the area was often used by travelling Romans as a camp site.

Around 616, a mighty Saxon warrior, Rædwald, stayed at the site prior to a battle with Ethelfrith, King of Mercia. During the battle, Rædwald's son, Regehere, was killed, and from that day, the area was known as Regehere's Wath, and has been further adapted to the present day spelling of Rainworth.

Rainworth Lodge was first built in 1190 as a hunting lodge. Rufus Clarke lived there in 1212 and was with King John's hunting parties in the forest. Little more is known about the village until the 16th century, when it is recorded that it was a peaceful hamlet with 13 dwellings:

- Three Thorn Hollow Farm;
- Six houses in the Old Square known as Ramsden Croft;
- The original Robin Hood Inn, then named the Sherwood Inn;
- The toll house, nicknamed The Inkpot; and
- Fve houses on the road leading to Mansfield.

The people who lived in Rainworth were farmers or nurserymen.

Until the opening of the railway line linking Mansfield to Southwell in 1871 there was no public transport and the only way to get from place to place was to walk. In 1879 an elm tree, later to be called the "Tree of Knowledge" was planted on the village green in front of the Robin Hood Inn. It became a favourite place for people to meet and talk. The tree eventually had to be cut down in 1962 when it became diseased. In 1890 Rainworth's first church, a wooden building was built. However it was later replaced by a brick building which was opened on the festival day of St Simon and St Jude in 1939.

A war memorial was established in the church grounds during 2010.

The building of the pumping station in 1895 meant that householders no longer had to get their water from wells and springs but from the pump outside the Robin Hood Inn. In 1911, two mineshafts were sunk marking the start of work at Rufford Colliery. Only two years later the colliery suffered its worst pit disaster when 13 men were killed in an accident. As the pit prospered so the need for housing grew and new housing was built along Kirklington Road. In 1914 the first primary school to be built in Rainworth, Heathlands, was opened. Python Hill School followed in 1924. It was not until 1963 that Joseph Whitaker School opened and Rainworth had its own secondary school. The school is named after the naturalist Joseph Whitaker, who lived for most of his life at Rainworth Lodge on Blidworth Lane.

As well as growth, Rainworth has also seen decline. The local railway service was stopped and the railway station closed in 1965. Also along with many other pits in the area, Rufford Colliery stopped producing coal in 1993. The colliery provided housing for approximately 400 families and leisure facilities such as a football ground and lido (which was in disuse by the end of the war), along with the Miners' Welfare. After over 80 years of service Rufford Colliery closed in 1993. Plans were drafted and planning applications submitted from 2006 onwards for the development of a waste incinerator on the colliery site, but eventually these proposals were withdrawn after much local public resistance (see Rufford Colliery#After mining). The site has now been restored to provide a natural woodland habitat.

The Miners' Welfare remains open, and has subsequent affiliations with the local football team and bowls club. In 1951, 40 council house had been completed, located on Kirklington Road, just beyond Python Hill School. A large housing estate was built in the 1950s, between Station Road and Warsop Lane (the Wimpey estate) and a further estate was built beyond the original council estate on Kirklington Road, sometime after 1965. This estate was built to accommodate families moved from mines in North East England – the estate became known as the Geordie Estate.

In 1975 killer Donald Neilson (the Black Panther) was caught by police officers helped by locals at the chip shop on Southwell Road East in the village.

== Demographics ==
The population for the civil parish of Rainworth was 6,532 at the 2001 census and the population for the Mansfield 012A (Rainworth) area was 1,289, which means a combined population of 7,821.

98% of Rainworth residents were White British. 153 people were from an ethnic minority.

The 2011 census showed:

- All residents: 6,879
- Number of households: 2,904
- Average household size: 2.40
- Residents in households: 6,828
- Residents in communal living: 51
- Area: 4,542 hectares (11,220 acres)
- Population density: 1.50 per hectare (0.61/acre)

For the civil parish area, there were 7,058 residents reported for the 2021 census.

== Governance ==
The Newark and Sherwood part of Rainworth is a parish in its own right, while the Mansfield part is unparished.

Rainworth is part of Newark and Sherwood and Mansfield councils with the boundary being near the bridge over Rainworth Water on Southwell Road East. The Mansfield area is part of the Ransom Wood ward and is represented by Labour's John Smart.

In the 2019 local elections to the Newark and Sherwood District Council (NSDC) – the Rainworth North & Rufford ward was won for the Conservatives. Dr Louis Brailsford and Tom Smith represented the ward from 2019–2023.

In 2023, Linda Tift and Claire Penny re-gained the ward for the Labour Party.

In the 2021 Nottinghamshire County Council elections, the Rainworth and Blidworth County Division was also won by Tom Smith for the Conservatives.

The Newark and Sherwood section is represented in Parliament by Michelle Welsh, MP. The Mansfield section is part of the Mansfield constituency, represented by Steve Yemm MP.

== Education ==
Joseph Whitaker School is on Warsop Lane.

Lake View Primary School is attached to Joseph Whitaker School.

Python Hill Junior and Infant School was an all ages to 15 school until the building of Joseph Whitaker School.

- Heathlands Primary School was built on a temporary basis at the start of the First World War on Southwell Road East but lasted until 2004 when a replacement was built on a nearby site in the village.

Dawn House School, a private school for children with speech and language difficulties, is also located in the village.

== Health ==
Rainworth lies in the Sherwood Forest Hospitals Foundation NHS trust area. Rainworth has its own GPs' surgery called Rainworth Primary Care Centre. The King's Mill Hospital in Sutton-in-Ashfield is the area's local hospital. It has an Accident and Emergency Department. Out of hours GP services are also based at King's Mill.

== Culture and recreation ==
Referred to as the childhood home of the orphaned Mrs Holroyd in The Widowing of Mrs Holroyd by D. H. Lawrence.

Pubs in Rainworth are the Lurcher on Westbrook Drive, Sherwood Inn on Kirklington Road, the Archer on Warsop Lane and the Robin Hood Inn on Southwell Road East (now a Tesco store) near the Co-op. There are no public houses in the Mansfield side of Rainworth.

Across from the Tesco on Kirklington Road is The Venue, a snooker club in the same building that used to house the old village cinema.

== Lindhurst Wind Farm ==
Rainworth is close to a five turbine wind farm called Lindhurst Wind Farm which was built in 2010, the wind farm was controversial at the time of building.

This wind farm is on Newark and Sherwood land in the nearby parish of Lindhurst, but is built within 400 m of the Mansfield District Council part of Rainworth village.

== Transport ==
The main road running through Rainworth is the B6020 Southwell Road East. The A617 dual-carriageway bypasses the village to the north; it opened in 2000.

Stagecoach East Midlands is the area's bus operator; routes connect Rainworth with Eakring, Bilsthorpe, Nottingham, Mansfield, Newark and Sutton-in-Ashfield.

The nearest National Rail station is at Mansfield, which is a stop on the Robin Hood line connecting Nottingham with Worksop; services are operated by East Midlands Railway. Blidworth and Rainworth railway station once served the area; it was a stop on the Rolleston Junction-Mansfield line and was closed in 1965.

The National Cycle Route 6 travels north to south from Keswick to London; from Worksop, it passes through Rainworth and into Sherwood Forest.

East Midlands Airport is located 28 miles (45 km) to the south-southeast in Castle Donington, Leicestershire.

== Media ==
The local paper covering the area is the Mansfield and Ashfield Chad, which has a separate edition for the Sherwood area.

Local for the area radio includes Mansfield 103.2 FM, BBC Radio Nottingham and 96-106 Capital FM. Rainworth receives BBC Radio 1, 2, 3 and 4 from either Holme Moss or Sutton Coldfield.

Rainworth is covered by the Central ITV and BBC East Midlands TV regions broadcast from the Waltham transmitting station.
