= Joseph Whitaker School =

School in Rainworth, Nottinghamshire, England

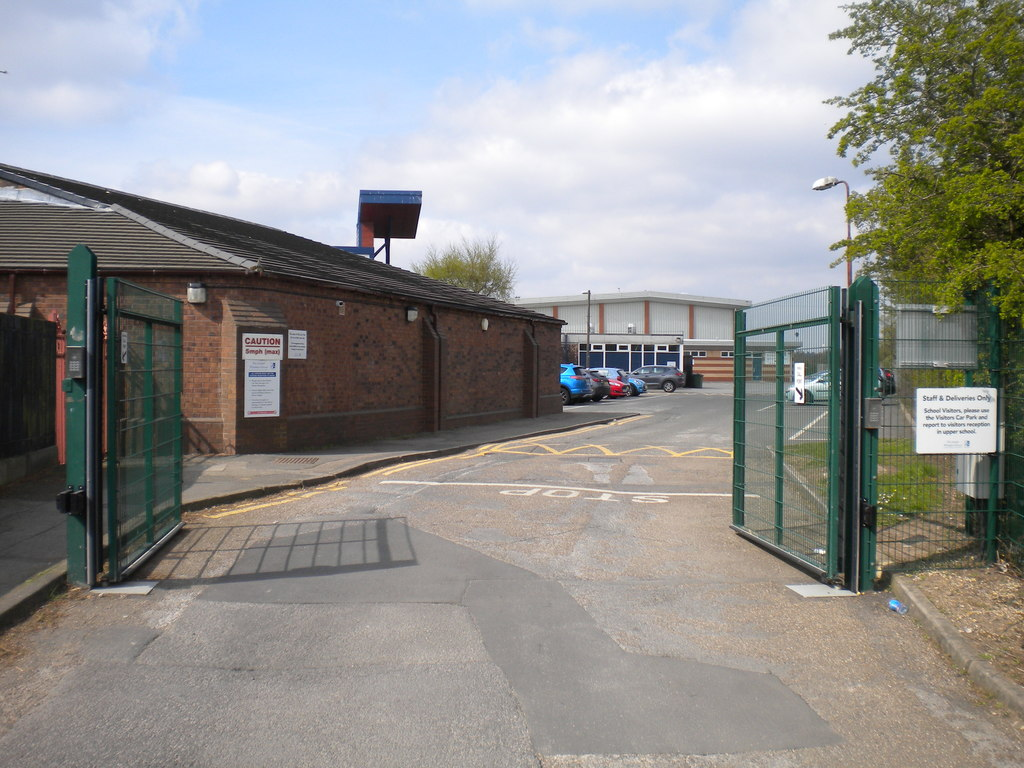
- Staff entrance

Location
- Warsop Lane; Rainworth, Nottinghamshire, NG21 0AG; England; 53°06′52″N 1°07′13″W

Information
- Type: Academy
- Motto: Spes et fides (Hope and faith)
- Established: 1963
- Department for Education URN: 137628 Tables
- Ofsted: Reports
- Head teacher: Carey Ayres
- Staff: 79 FTE teaching staff, ~30 support staff
- Gender: Mixed
- Age: 11 to 18
- Enrolment: 1,338 (as of 2024)
- Houses: Sherwood (Green), Rufford (Red), Clumber (Yellow), Newstead (Blue)
- Colours: Blazer: Navy Blue; Necktie: Navy Blue with Blue, Green, Red and Yellow stripes (according to students' house); Trousers: Middle Grey
- Website: www.josephwhitaker.org

Joseph Whitaker School is a secondary school with academy status in Rainworth near Mansfield, Nottinghamshire, in England. The school takes its name from Joseph Whitaker, a naturalist who lived in Rainworth at Rainworth Lodge.

== History ==
=== Secondary modern school ===
The school opened in 1963.

A large fire gutted the building on Monday 19 March 1973, with £250,000 in damage.

=== Comprehensive ===
An arson attack on the lunchtime of Monday 31 October 1994 caused £750,000 in damage, and destroyed the sports hall, laundry, gym, two squash courts, and changing rooms. The arson was featured in a Newsround documentary on arson in schools.

== Structure ==
Headeacher John Loughton started in 1991 when there were 980 pupils, and retired in 2010 after the school had achieved specialist sports college status with 1230 pupils.

The school is part of the East Midlands Educational Trust (EMET) which it joined in September 2016. The headteacher is Carey Ayres, who took over from Mr Bell in 2020.

The school has its own sixth form college for post-16 A-Level studies. In November 2012, the school's flagship £1,000,000 sixth form centre opened. It contains teaching rooms, a media suite, various study areas and a café. All post-16 students have access to the school's on-site fitness suite as part of their membership to the sixth form.
