= Nottingham =

City and council area in Nottinghamshire, England

- City and unitary authority
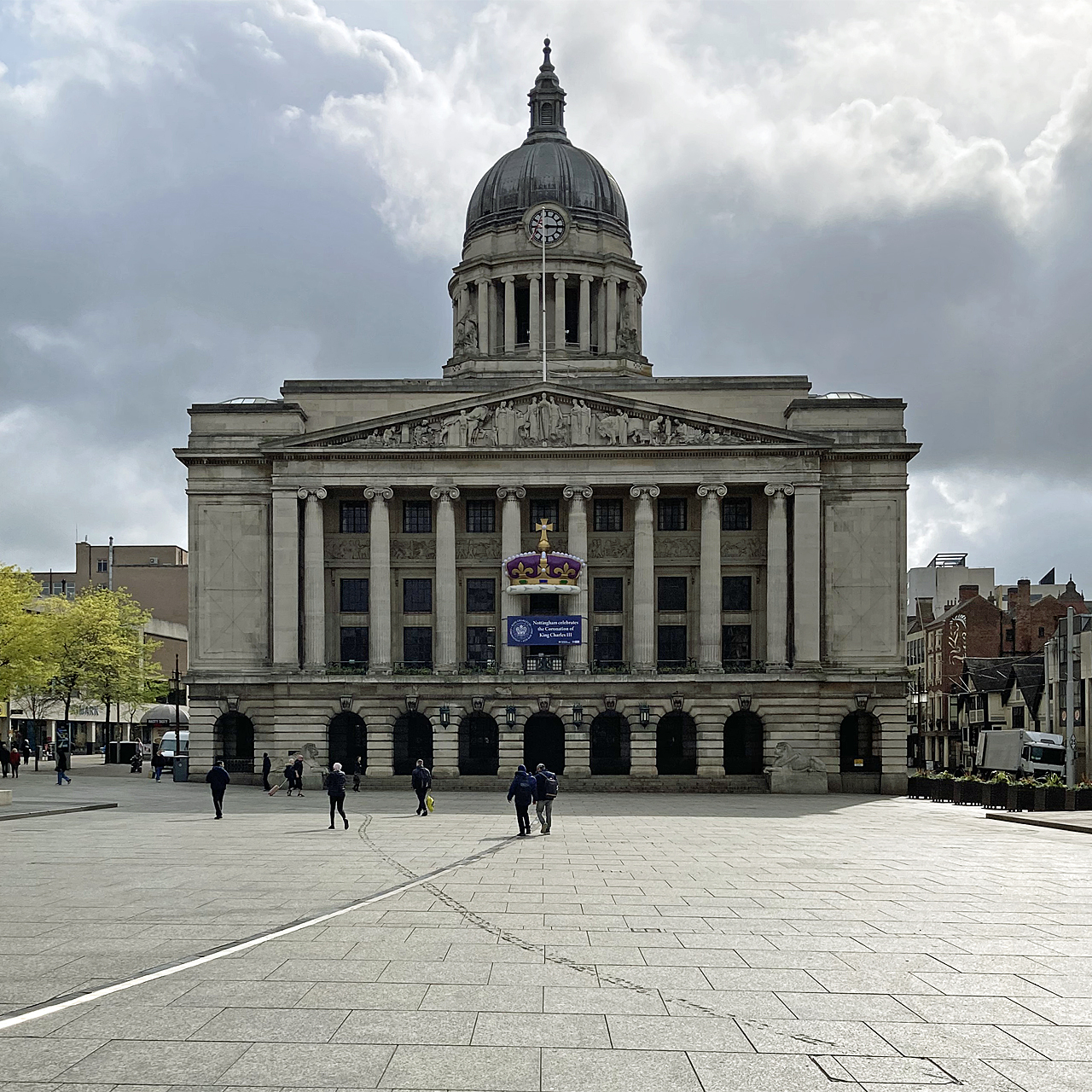
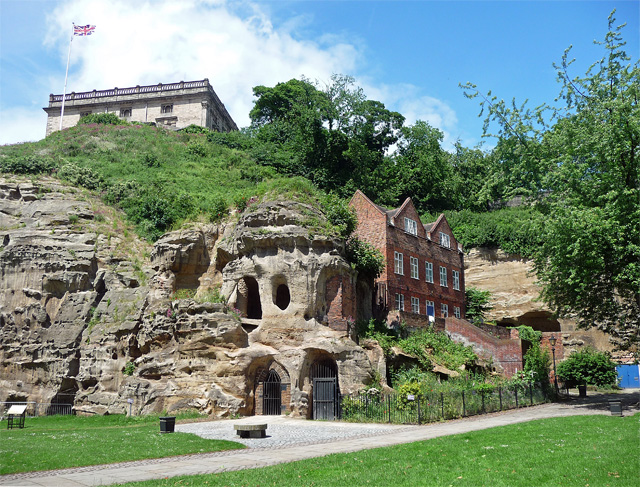
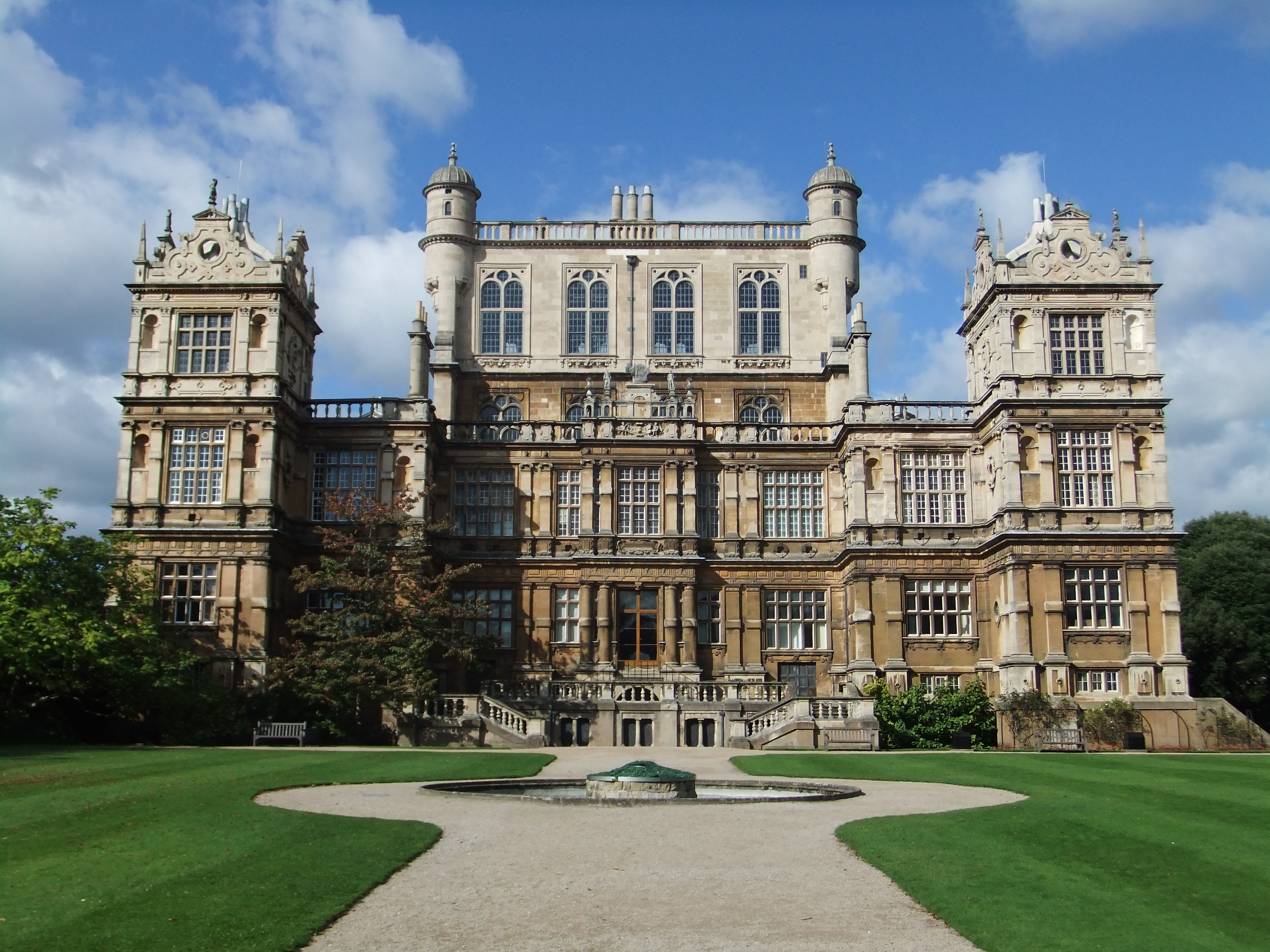
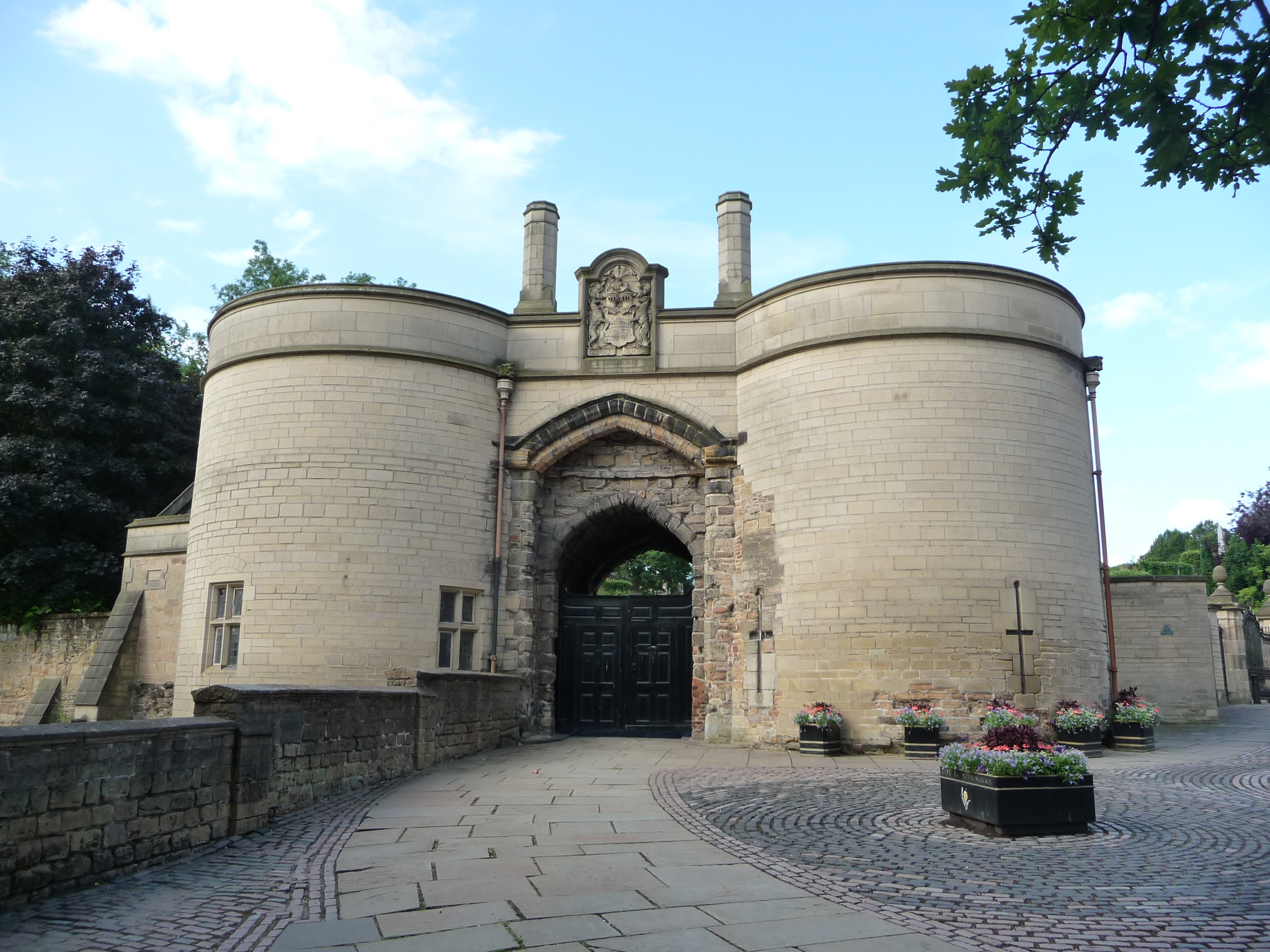
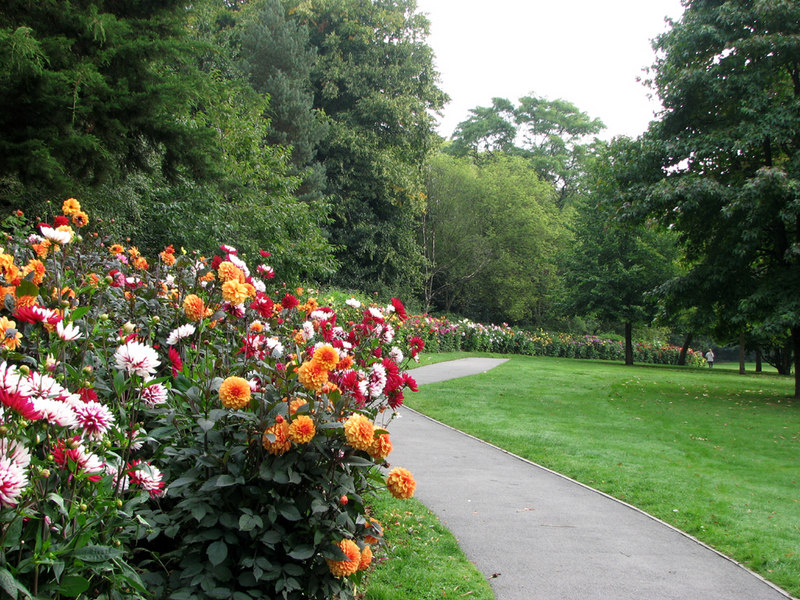
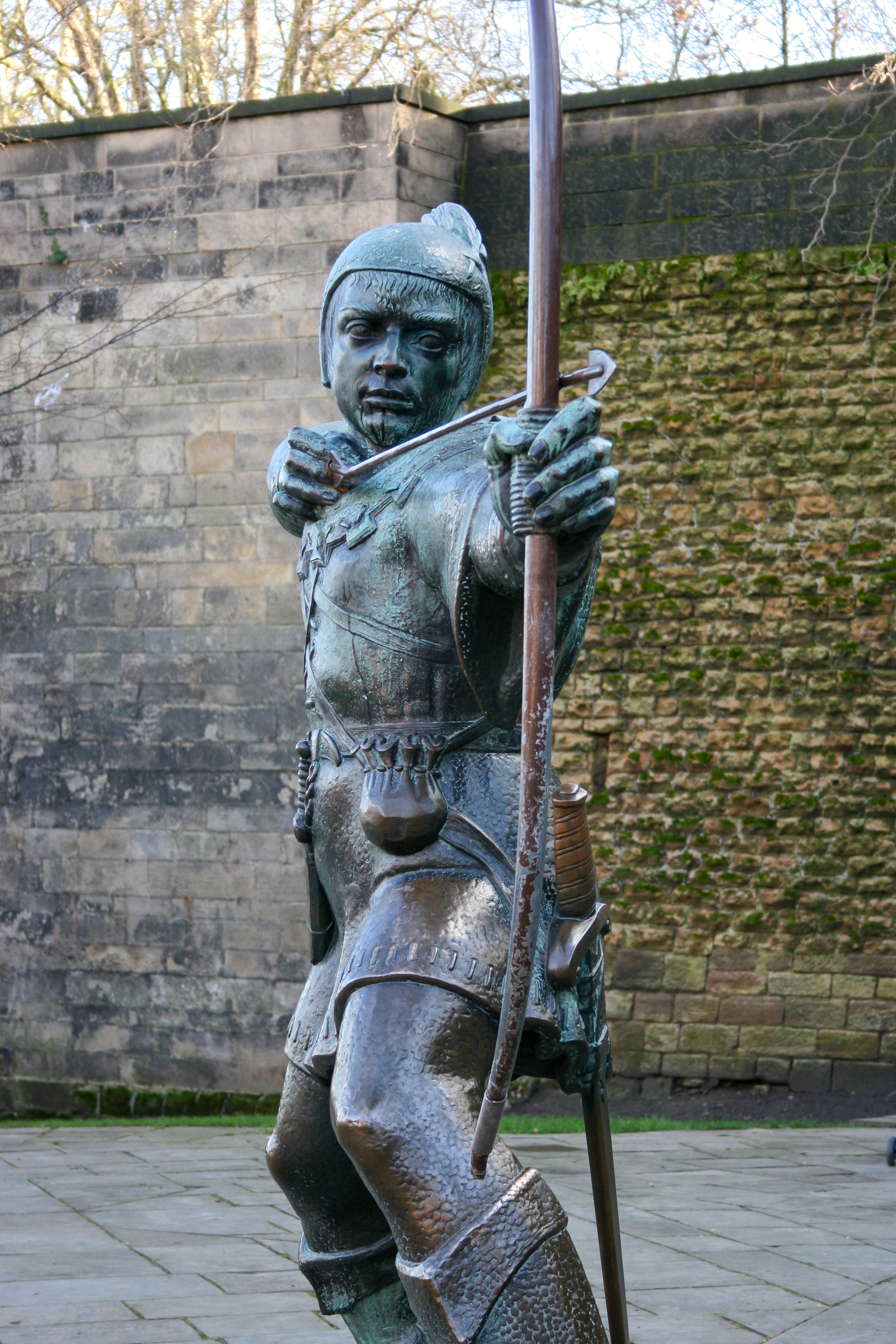
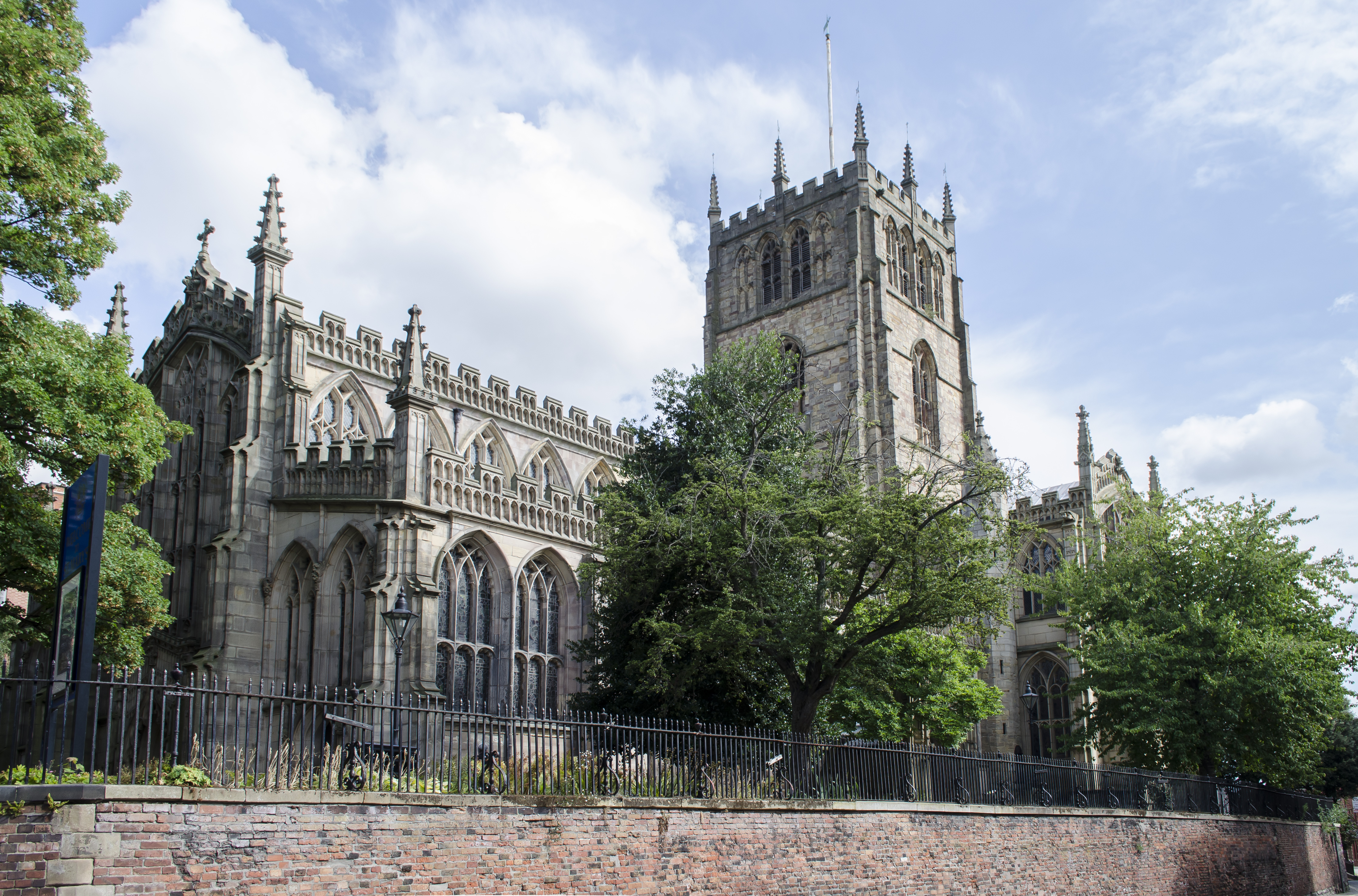
- Council House City of Caves Wollaton Hall The Castle The Arboretum Robin Hood St Mary's Church

- Coat of arms
- Nickname: "the Queen of the Midlands"
- Motto: Latin: Vivit Post Funera Virtus, lit. 'Virtue Outlives Death'
- Shown within Nottinghamshire
- Coordinates: 52.96°N 1.15°W
- OS grid reference: SK 5711 4020
- Sovereign state: United Kingdom
- Constituent country: England
- Region: East Midlands
- Shire county: Nottinghamshire
- Combined Authority: East Midlands
- Settled: 6th century
- City status: 1897
- Unitary authority: 1998
- Administrative HQ: Loxley House
- Civic suite: Nottingham Council House
- Areas of the city (2011 census BUASD): List: Aspley; Bakersfield; Basford; Bestwood; Bilborough; Broxtowe; Bulwell (Town); Carrington; Cinderhill; City Centre; Clifton (Village); Forest Fields; Highbury Vale; Hyson Green; Lace Market; Lenton; Mapperley; New Basford; Radford; Rise Park; Sherwood; Sneinton; St Ann's; Top Valley; The Park; Wilford; Wollaton

Government
  - Type: Unitary authority with leader and cabinet
  - Body: Nottingham City Council
  - Control: Labour
  - Leader: Neghat Khan (L)
  - Lord Mayor: Cheryl Barnard
  - Chief Executive: Sajeeda Rose
  - House of Commons: 3 MPs: Nadia Whittome (L); Alex Norris (L); Lilian Greenwood (L)

Area
  - Total: 75 km^{2} (29 sq mi)
  - Rank: 223rd

Population (2025)
  - Total: 325,765
  - Rank: 41st
  - Density: 4,365/km^{2} (11,310/sq mi)
- Demonym: Nottinghamian

Ethnicity (2021)
  - Ethnic groups: List: 65.9% White; 14.9% Asian; 10.0% Black; 5.9% Mixed; 3.3% other

Religion (2021)
  - Religion: List: 41.2% no religion; 34.7% Christianity; 12.2% Islam; 1.7% Hinduism; 1.3% Sikhism; 0.5% Buddhism; 0.3% Judaism; 0.7% other; 7.4% not stated
- Time zone: UTC+0 (GMT)
  - Summer (DST): UTC+1 (BST)
- Postcode area: NG
- Dialling code: 0115
- ISO 3166 code: GB-NGM
- GSS code: E06000018
- ITL code: TLF14
- GVA: 2021 estimate
  - Total: £10.8 billion
  - Per capita: £33,661
- GDP (nominal): 2021 estimate
  - Total: £11.8 billion
  - Per capita: £36,980
- Website: nottinghamcity.gov.uk

Nottingham (/ˈnɒtɪŋəm/ NOT-ing-əm) is a city and unitary authority area in Nottinghamshire, East Midlands, England. It is located 42 miles (68 km) south-east of Sheffield and 54 miles (87 km) north-east of Birmingham. Nottingham is the legendary home of Robin Hood's belligerent Sheriff of Nottingham, and is historically associated with the lace-making, bicycle and tobacco industries. The city is also the county town of Nottinghamshire and the settlement was granted its city charter in 1897, as part of Queen Victoria's Diamond Jubilee celebrations. Nottingham is a UNESCO "City of Literature".

In the 2021 census, Nottingham had a reported population of 323,632. The wider conurbation, which includes many of the city's suburbs (including Arnold and Carlton), has a population of 768,638. It is the largest urban area in the East Midlands and the second-largest in the Midlands. Its Functional Urban Area, the largest in the East Midlands, has a population of 919,484. The population of the Nottingham/Derby metropolitan area is estimated to be 1,610,000. The metropolitan economy of Nottingham is the seventh-largest in the United Kingdom with a GDP of $50.9 billion (2014). Aside from Birmingham, it is the only city in the Midlands to be ranked as a sufficiency-level world city by the Globalization and World Cities Research Network.

Nottingham is a major sporting centre and, in October 2015, was named "Home of English Sport". The National Ice Centre, Holme Pierrepont National Water Sports Centre and Trent Bridge international cricket ground are all based in or around the city, which is also the home of two professional football teams: Notts County, recognised as the world's oldest professional league club, and Nottingham Forest, two-time winners of the UEFA European Cup under Brian Clough in 1979 and 1980. The city has professional rugby, ice hockey and cricket teams; it also hosts the Nottingham Open, an international tennis tournament on the ATP and WTA tours. This accolade came just over a year after Nottingham was named as the UK's first City of Football.

The city is served by Nottingham railway station and the Nottingham Express Transit tram system; its bus company, Nottingham City Transport, is the largest publicly owned bus network in England. In December 2015, Nottingham was named a 'City of Literature' by UNESCO, joining a list of 20 Cities of Literature. The title reflects Nottingham's literary heritage, with Lord Byron, D. H. Lawrence and Alan Sillitoe having links to the city, as well as a contemporary literary community, a publishing industry and a poetry scene. The city is served by three universities: the University of Nottingham, Nottingham Trent University and the Nottingham campus of the University of Law; it hosts the highest concentration of higher education providers in the East Midlands.

== Toponymy ==
The name Nottingham comes from the Old English Snotingaham, meaning "homestead of the Snotingas" (that is, "the family or followers of a man called Snot"). The likely origin of the name Snot is an Old Norse word from the root “snotr,” meaning wise or clever. The Prose Edda documents the tale of a Norse goddess of wisdom, Snotra.

The loss of the initial S is due to Norman influence. In his Life of King Alfred, the Welsh cleric Asser refers to Nottingham as Tigguocobauc (modern Welsh Tŷ Gogofawg), meaning "cave house". It is unclear, however, whether this is a genuine Welsh name for Nottingham or an invention of Asser's.

== History ==
The written history of Nottingham dates back to 919 AD, when Edward the Elder captured the settlement, subsequently building a fortress on the south bank of the Trent. Following the Norman Conquest William the Conqueror built a castle in Nottingham, which he entrusted to William Peverel.

1707 engraving of Nottingham

The Anglo-Saxon settlement was originally confined to the area today known as the Lace Market and was surrounded by a substantial defensive ditch and rampart. The ditch had fallen out of use and been filled in by the time of Domesday Book (1086). Following the Norman Conquest,the Saxon settlement developed into the "English Borough" of Nottingham. A "French Borough" also developed around the castle on the hill opposite. Eventually the space between was built on as the town grew and the Old Market Square became the focus of Nottingham. Defences consisted initially of a ditch and bank in the early 12th century. The ditch was widened in the mid-13th century and a stone wall built around much of the perimeter of the town. A short length of the wall survives and is visible at the northern end of Maid Marian Way. It is protected as a Scheduled Monument.

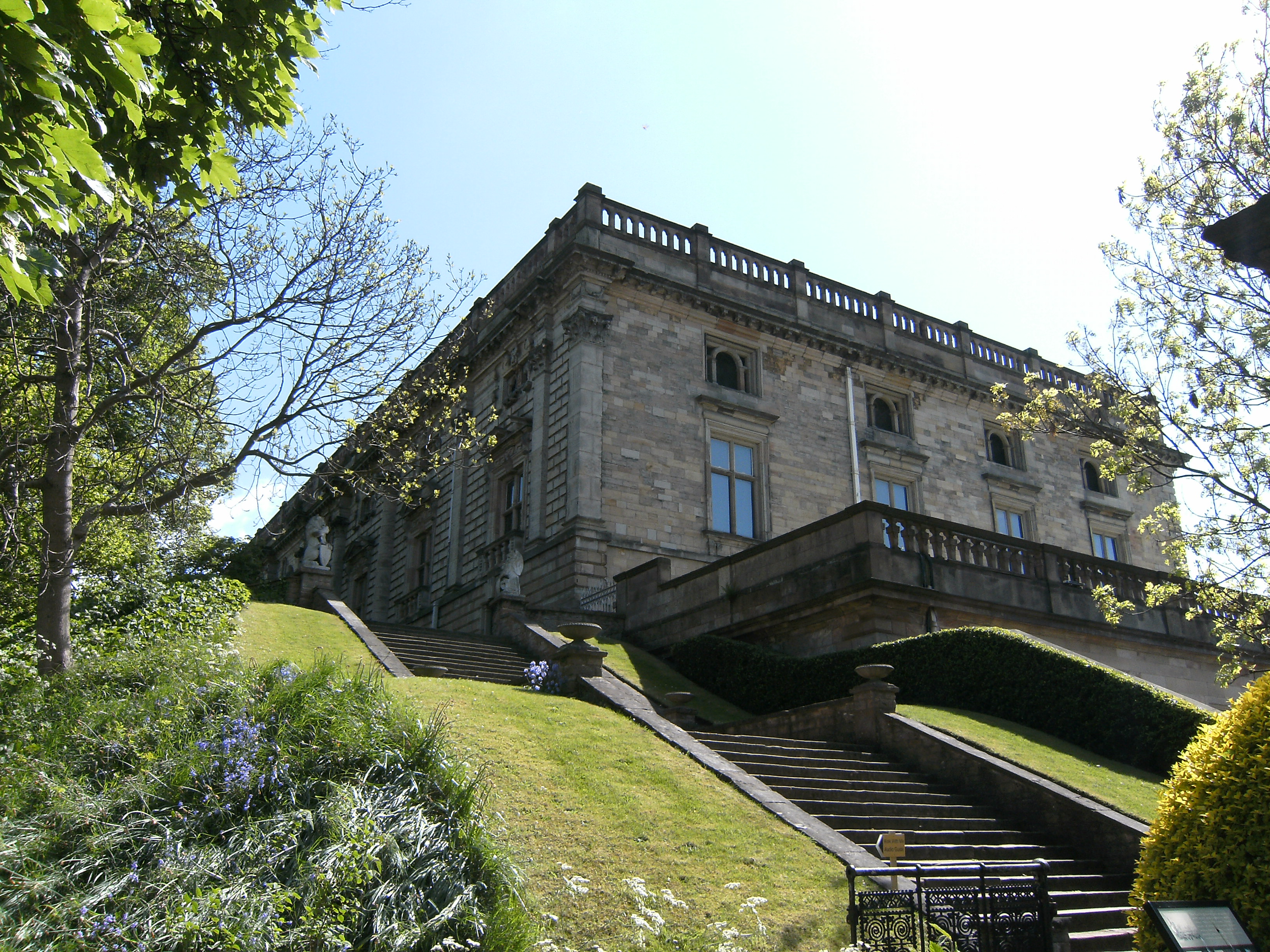
Nottingham Castle

On the return of Richard the Lionheart from the Crusades in 1194, the castle was occupied by supporters of Prince John, including the Sheriff of Nottingham. It was besieged by Richard and after a sharp conflict was captured.

It is believed that during the Black Death of 1349 approximately 60% of Nottingham's population died but that migration from other parts of England helped begin the process of population recovery.

By the 15th century Nottingham had established itself as the centre of a thriving export trade in religious sculpture made from Nottingham alabaster. During the late medieval period Nottingham alabasters were exported as far afield as Iceland and may be one reason why a small number of Icelandic immigrants lived in Nottingham during the 15th century. The town became a county corporate in 1449, giving it effective self-government, in the words of the charter, "for eternity". The Castle and Shire Hall were expressly excluded and remained as detached parishes of Nottinghamshire.

One of those highly impressed by Nottingham in the late 18th century was the German traveller C. P. Moritz, who wrote in 1782, "Of all the towns I have seen outside London, Nottingham is the loveliest and neatest. Everything had a modern look, and a large space in the centre was hardly less handsome than a London square. A charming footpath leads over the fields to the highway, where a bridge spans the Trent. … Nottingham … with its high houses, red roofs and church steeples, looks excellent from a distance."

During the Industrial Revolution much of Nottingham's prosperity was founded on the textile industry; in particular the city became an internationally important centre of lace manufacture. In 1831 citizens rioted in protest against the Duke of Newcastle's opposition to the Reform Act 1832, setting fire to his residence on the site of Nottingham Castle.

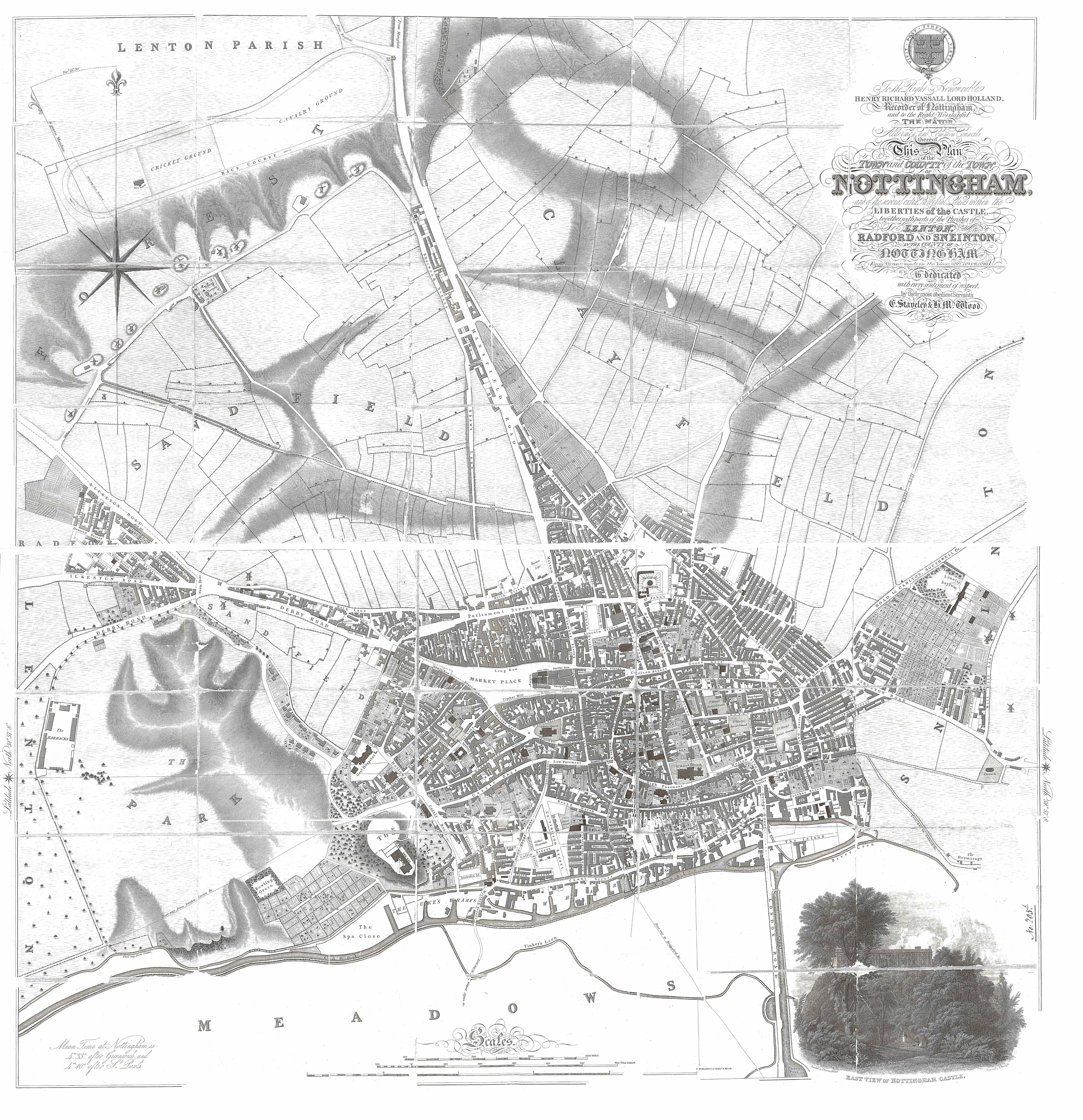
Nottingham in 1831

In common with the rest of the British textile industry Nottingham's textile sector fell into decline in the decades following the Second World War. Little textile manufacture now takes place in Nottingham; however many of the former industrial buildings in the Lace Market district have been restored and put to new uses.

Nottingham was one of the boroughs reformed by the Municipal Corporations Act 1835 and at that time consisted of the parishes of St Mary, St Nicholas and St Peter. It was expanded in 1877 by the addition of the parishes of Basford, Brewhouse Yard, Bulwell, Radford, Sneinton, Standard Hill and parts of the parishes of West Bridgford, Carlton and Wilford (North Wilford). In 1889 Nottingham became a county borough under the Local Government Act 1888. City status was awarded as part of Queen Victoria's Diamond Jubilee celebrations and conveyed in a letter dated 18 June 1897 from the prime minister, the Marquess of Salisbury, to the mayor.

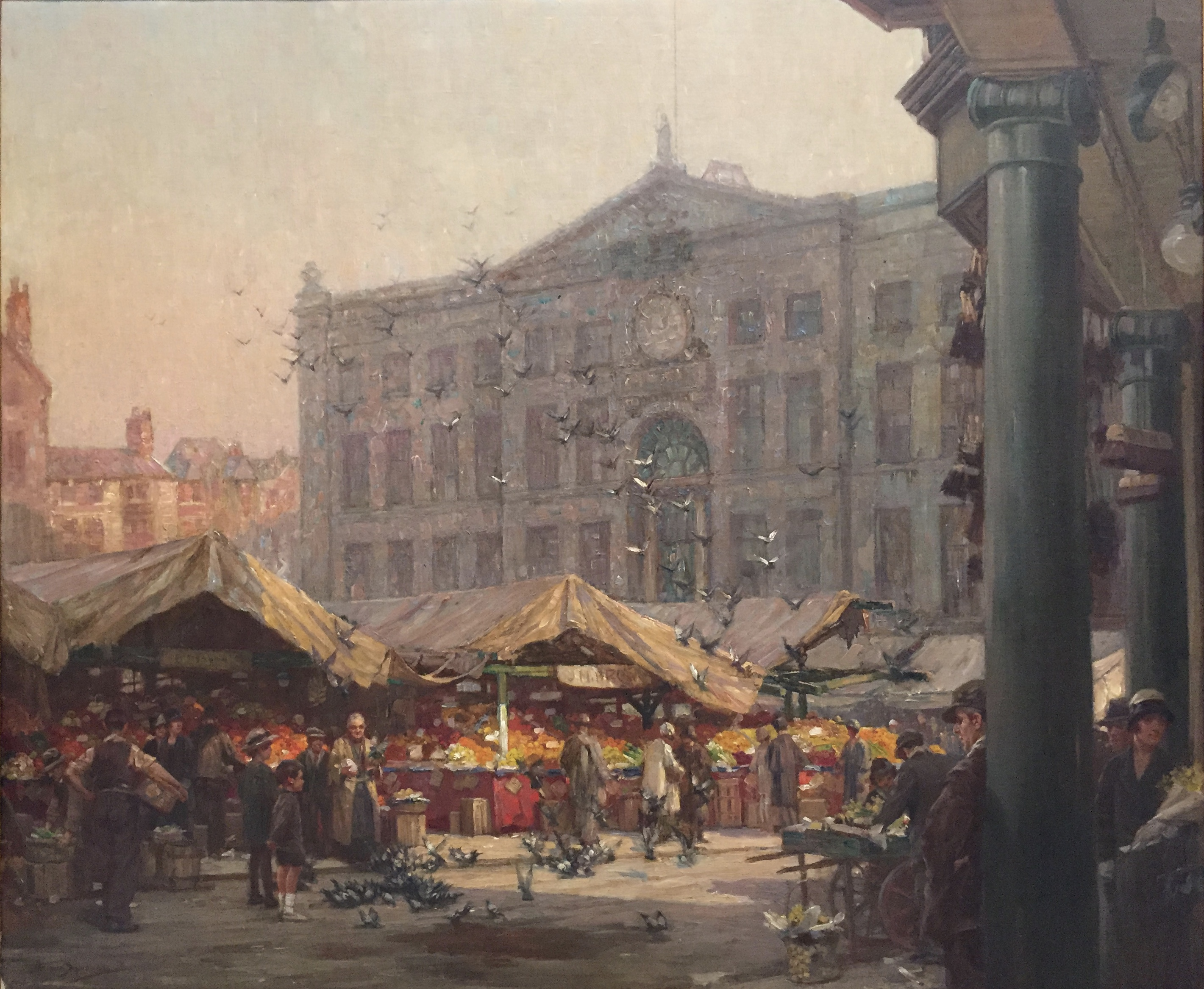
The Market Place in 1920

The city was enlarged in 1933 by the addition of Bilborough and Wollaton, parts of the parishes of Bestwood Park and Colwick and a recently developed part of the Beeston Urban District. A further boundary extension occurred in 1951 when Clifton and Wilford (south of the River Trent) were incorporated into the city.

Demographic evolution of Nottingham

Year	Pop.
4th century	<37
10th century	<1,000
11th century	1,500

Year	Pop.
14th century	3,000
Early 17th century	4,000
Late 17th century	5,000

Year	Pop.	±%
1801	29,000	—
1811	34,000	+17.2%
1821	40,000	+17.6%
1831	51,000	+27.5%
1841	53,000	+3.9%
1851	58,000	+9.4%
1861	76,000	+31.0%

Year	Pop.	±%
1871	87,000	+14.5%
1881	159,000	+82.8%
1901	240,000	+50.9%
1911	260,000	+8.3%
1921	269,000	+3.5%
1931	265,000	−1.5%
1951	306,000	+15.5%

Year	Pop.	±%
1961	312,000	+2.0%
1971	301,000	−3.5%
1981	278,000	−7.6%
1991	273,000	−1.8%
2001	275,000	+0.7%
2011	306,000	+11.3%
2021	324,000	+5.9%

Electric trams were introduced to the city in 1901; they served the city for 35 years until 1936. Trams were reintroduced after 68 years when a new network opened in 2004.

In the sporting world, Nottingham is home to the world's oldest professional football club, Notts County, which was formed in 1862. The town's other football club, Nottingham Forest, had a period of success between 1977 and 1993 under manager Brian Clough, winning the First Division, four League Cups, a UEFA Super Cup and two European Cups. During this time Forest signed Trevor Francis, Britain's first £1 million footballer, who joined the club in February 1979 from Birmingham City.

The city was the site of race riots in 1958, centred on the St Ann's neighbourhood.

During the second half of the 20th century Nottingham saw urban growth with the development of new public and private housing estates and new urban centres, which have engulfed former rural villages such as Bilborough, Wollaton, Gedling and Bramcote. South of the river there has also been expansion with new areas such as Edwalton and West Bridgford, adding to Nottingham's urban sprawl. Although this growth slowed towards the end of the century the modern pressures for more affordable and council housing are back on the political agenda and there is now pressure on the green belt that surrounds the city.

== Governance ==
=== Local government ===
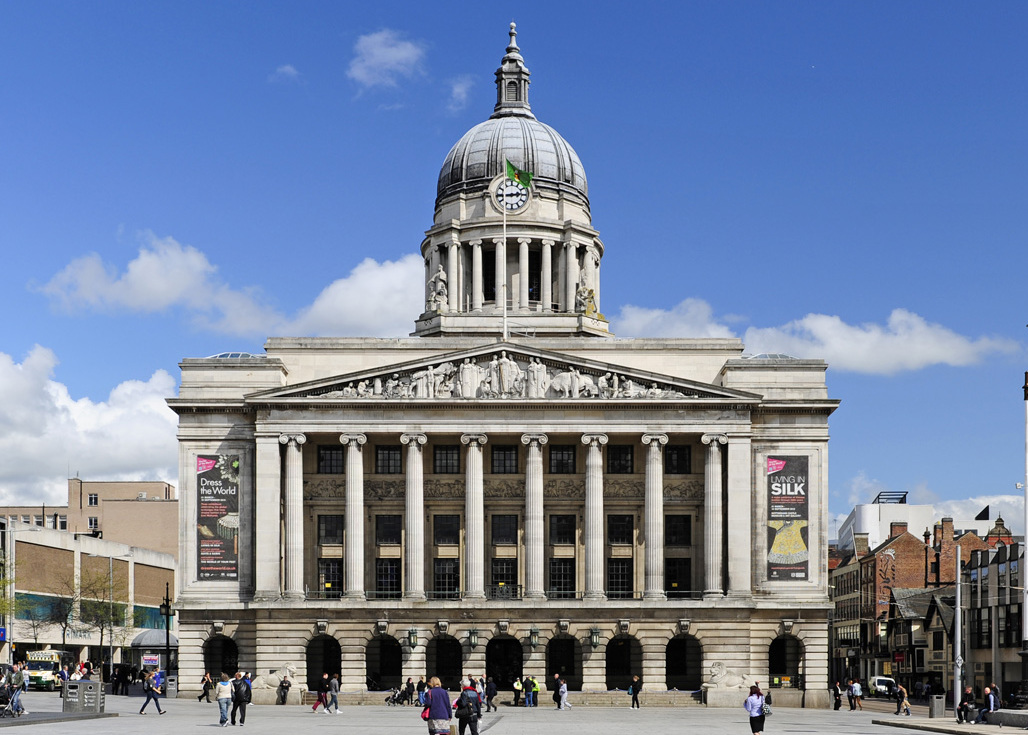
Nottingham Council House

Nottingham City Council is a unitary authority and is based at Loxley House on Station Street. It consists of 55 councillors, representing 20 wards, who are elected every four years; the last elections were held on 4 May 2023. The council is independent of Nottinghamshire County Council but works with them for local developments and other matters. Nottingham remains the county town of Nottinghamshire, even though the county hall is in the neighbouring town of West Bridgford, where the county council is based. Since May 2024, the city has been a constituent member of the East Midlands Combined County Authority with a regional mayor.

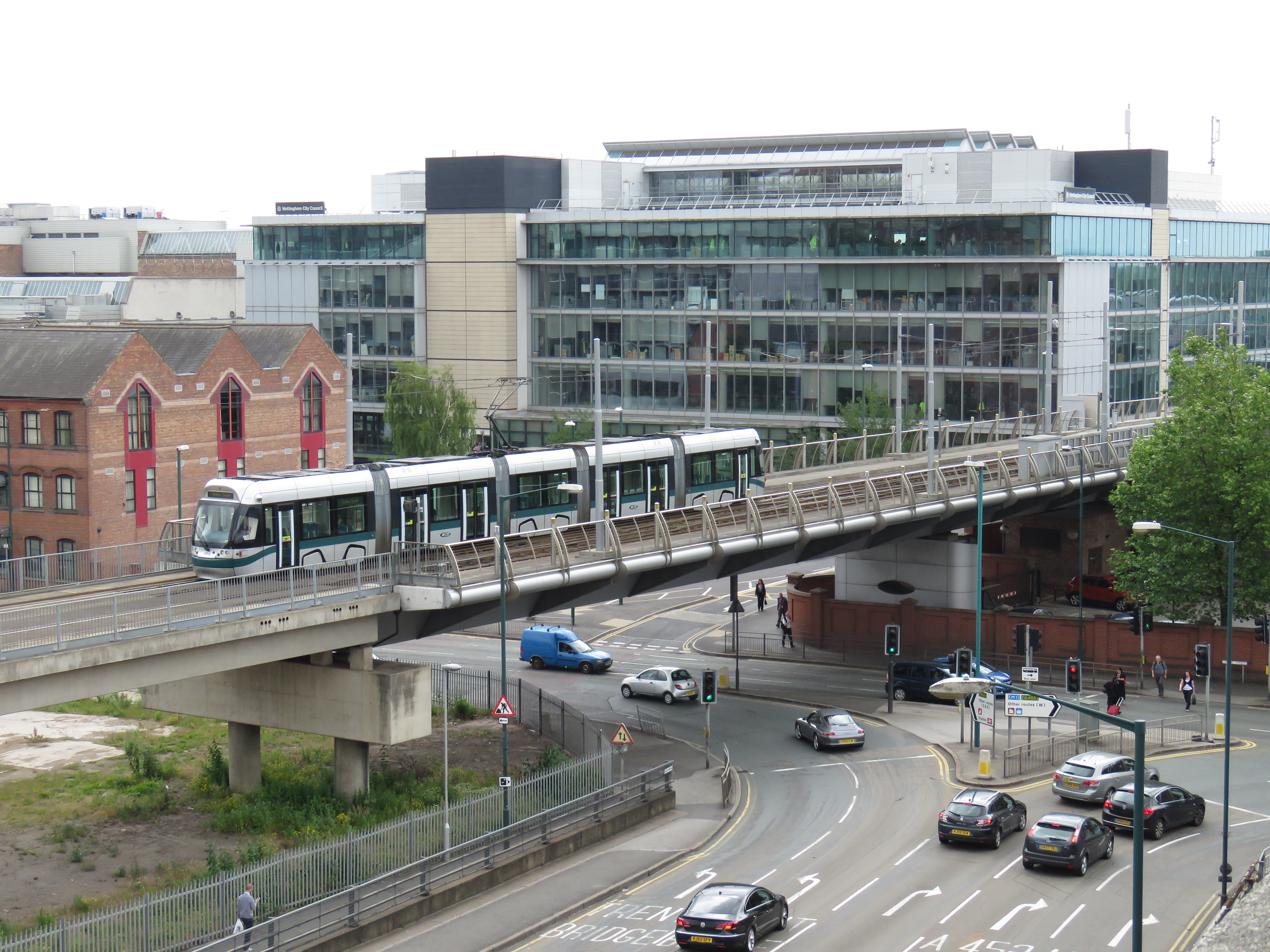
Loxley House, Nottingham

The city also has a Lord Mayor who is selected by city councillors from among themselves. The position is largely ceremonial but the Lord Mayor also acts as Chair of Full Council meetings.

The City of Nottingham's boundaries are tightly drawn and exclude several suburbs and towns that are usually considered part of the larger Greater Nottingham. Unlike the city, these areas are governed by a two tier system of local government. Nottinghamshire County Council is based at the county hall. It provides the upper tier of local government whilst the lower tier is split into several district or borough councils. The County Council are responsible for Health, Social Care, Education, Highways, Transport, Libraries and Trading Standards, whilst the lower tier councils are responsible for local planning, neighbourhood services, housing, licensing, environmental health and leisure facilities. The towns of Beeston, Stapleford and Eastwood are administered by Broxtowe Borough Council. Further west still, the Nottingham urban district extends into Derbyshire where Ilkeston and Long Eaton are administered by Erewash Borough Council, and Ripley by Amber Valley. To the north, Hucknall is governed by Ashfield District Council, while in the east Arnold and Carlton form part of the Borough of Gedling. South of the river, the town of West Bridgford lies in Rushcliffe, as do the outlying villages of Ruddington and Tollerton and the town of Bingham.

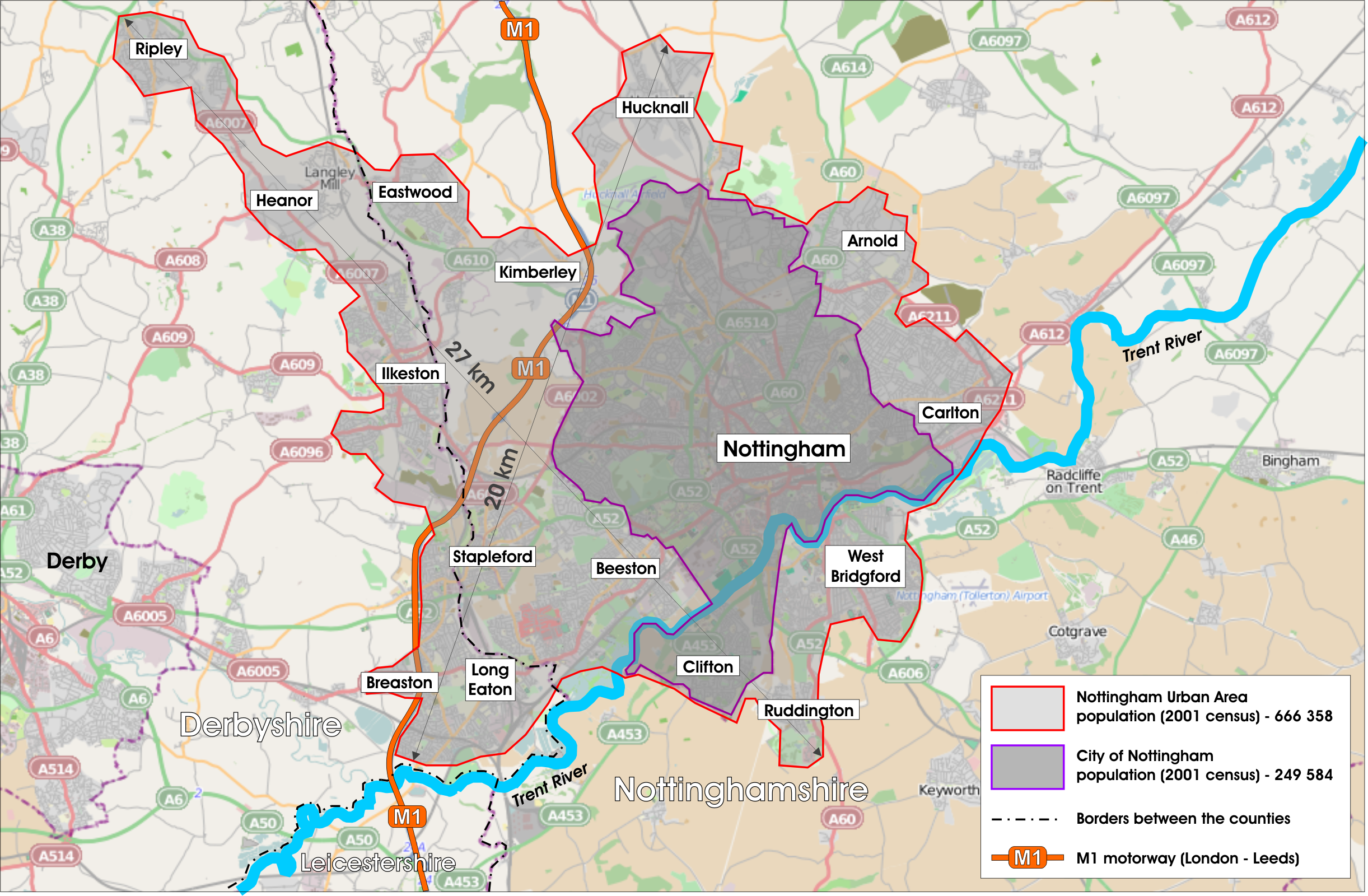
Map illustrating the boundaries of the city and the wider Greater Nottingham area

Under current local government reorganisaion plants, most of the urban area will become part of a Greater Nottingham unitary authority from 2028, with elections to a shadow Greater Nottingham Council taking place in 2027.

=== UK Parliament ===
Nottingham has three UK parliamentary constituency seats within its boundaries. Nottingham North has been represented since 2017 by Labour Member of Parliament (MP) Alex Norris, Nottingham East since 2019 by Labour MP Nadia Whittome and Nottingham South since 2010 by Labour MP Lilian Greenwood. Each of the outer districts (Broxtowe, Ashfield, Gedling and Rushcliffe) are also parliamentary constituencies in their own right although the parliamentary constituency boundaries do not align with the boundaries of the council districts of which they share their name.

Nottingham East	Nottingham North	Nottingham South
Nadia Whittome	Alex Norris	Lilian Greenwood
Labour Party	Labour Party	Labour Party

== Geography ==
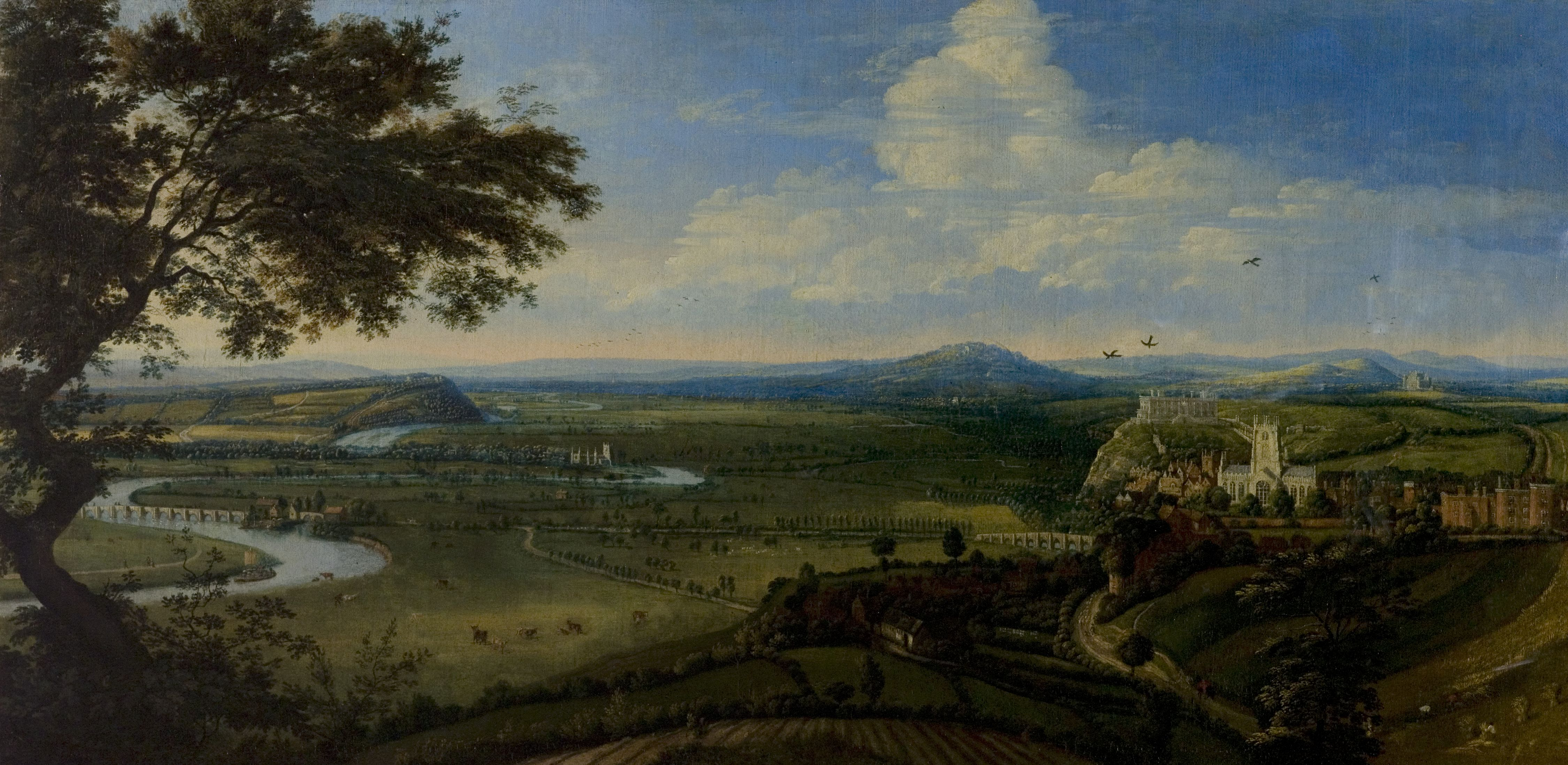
Nottingham from the east, c. 1695, painted by Jan Siberechts

Nottingham is situated on an area of low hills along the lower valley of the River Trent, and is surrounded by the Sherwood Forest in the north, the Nottinghamshire, Derbyshire and Yorkshire Coalfield in the west, and the Trent and Belvoir Vales in the east and south.

Within the city native wildlife includes red fox, peregrine falcon and common kingfisher. Notable nature reserves around the city include Attenborough Nature Reserve SSSI, Sherwood Forest National Nature Reserve, Holme Pit SSSI, Fairham Brook Local Wildlife Site and Wollaton Park. Owing to its position as a central city with strong transport links, Nottingham has become home to invasive animal and plant species including rose-ringed parakeet, Japanese knotweed and Himalayan balsam.

In 2017, it was reported that Nottingham was one of a number of UK cities that broke WHO air pollution guidelines for the maximum concentration of small particulate matter, the pollution in part being caused by wood-burning stoves.

Nottingham is bounded by a green belt, provisionally drawn up from the 1950s. Completely encircling the city, it extends for several miles into the surrounding districts as well as towards Derby.

=== Within the city ===
Map of Nottingham showing the city boundary
- Alexandra Park
- The Arboretum
- Aspley
- Bakersfield
- Basford
- Beechdale
- Bestwood
- Bestwood Park
- Bilborough
- Broxtowe
- Bulwell town
- Bulwell Hall
- Carrington
- Cinderhill
- Clifton
- Dunkirk
- Forest Fields
- Highbury Vale
- Hockley
- Hyson Green
- Lace Market
- Lenton
- Lenton Abbey
- Mapperley
- Mapperley Park
- The Meadows
- New Basford
- Nottingham city centre
- Old Basford
- The Park
- Radford
- Rise Park
- Sherwood
- Sherwood Rise
- Silverdale
- Snape Wood
- Sneinton
- St Anns
- Strelley
- Thorneywood
- Top Valley
- Whitemoor
- Wilford
- Wollaton

=== Around the city ===
- Arnold
- Attenborough
- Beeston
- Bestwood Village
- Bingham
- Bramcote
- Bulcote
- Burton Joyce
- Calverton
- Carlton
- Chilwell (Beeston)
- Colwick
- Cotgrave
- Daybrook (Arnold)
- Eastwood
- East Leake
- Edwalton
- Fairham
- Gamston
- Gedling
- Giltbrook
- Gotham
- Holme Pierrepont
- Hucknall
- Ilkeston (Derbyshire)
- Keyworth
- Killisick (Arnold)
- Kimberley
- Lady Bay
- Langley Mill (Derbyshire)
- Lambley
- Long Eaton (Derbyshire)
- Lowdham
- Netherfield
- Nuthall
- Radcliffe-on-Trent
- Redhill (Arnold)
- Ruddington
- Sandiacre (Derbyshire)
- Sawley (Derbyshire)
- Stapleford
- Strelley Village
- Toton
- Trowell
- Warren Hill (Arnold)
- West Bridgford
- Woodthorpe (Arnold)

=== Climate ===
Like most of the United Kingdom, Nottingham has a temperate oceanic climate (Köppen: Cfb) and experiences warm mild summers and mild to cool winters with abundant precipitation throughout the year. There are two weather-reporting stations close to Nottingham: the former "Nottingham Weather Centre", at Watnall, about 6 miles (10 km) northwest of the city centre; and the University of Nottingham's agricultural campus at Sutton Bonington, about 10 miles (16 km) southwest of the city centre. The highest temperature recorded in Nottingham (Watnall) stands at 39.8 °C (103.6 °F), whilst Sutton Bonington recorded a temperature of 39.4 °C (102.9 °F), both recorded on 19 July 2022, and the record-high minimum temperature is 21.3 °C (70.3 °F) recorded on 24 June 2026. On average, a temperature of 25 °C (77 °F) or above is recorded on 11 days per year, whilst a temperature of 30 °C (86 °F) is recorded at least 1 day per year at Watnall for the period of 1991–2020, and the warmest day of the year reaches an average of 30.0 °C (86.0 °F).

For the period 1991–2020 Nottingham (Watnall) recorded on average 36.9 days of air frost per year, and Sutton Bonington 42.2. The lowest recorded temperature in Nottingham (Watnall) is −13.3 °C (8.1 °F) recorded on 23 January 1963 and 13 January 1987, whilst a temperature of −17.8 °C (0.0 °F) was recorded in Sutton Bonington on 24 February 1947. The record-low maximum temperature is −6.3 °C (20.7 °F) recorded in January 1963. For the period of 1991–2020, the coldest temperature of the year reaches an average of −5.5 °C (22.1 °F) in Nottingham (Watnall).

Climate data for Nottingham Watnall (Note: Weather station is located 5.6 miles (9.0 km) from the Nottingham city centre.) WMO ID: 03354; coordinates: 53°00′20″N 1°15′04″W; elevation: 117 m (384 ft); 1991–2020 normals, extremes 1957–present
Month	Jan	Feb	Mar	Apr	May	Jun	Jul	Aug	Sep	Oct	Nov	Dec	Year
Record high °C (°F)	14.5 (58.1)	18.6 (65.5)	22.8 (73.0)	25.9 (78.6)	32.4 (90.3)	34.8 (94.6)	39.8 (103.6)	36.9 (98.4)	30.8 (87.4)	28.4 (83.1)	17.9 (64.2)	15.0 (59.0)	39.8 (103.6)
Mean daily maximum °C (°F)	6.9 (44.4)	7.7 (45.9)	10.1 (50.2)	13.2 (55.8)	16.4 (61.5)	19.2 (66.6)	21.5 (70.7)	21.1 (70.0)	18.1 (64.6)	13.9 (57.0)	9.8 (49.6)	7.2 (45.0)	13.8 (56.8)
Daily mean °C (°F)	4.3 (39.7)	4.7 (40.5)	6.5 (43.7)	9.0 (48.2)	11.9 (53.4)	14.8 (58.6)	16.9 (62.4)	16.7 (62.1)	14.2 (57.6)	10.7 (51.3)	7.0 (44.6)	4.6 (40.3)	10.1 (50.2)
Mean daily minimum °C (°F)	1.7 (35.1)	1.7 (35.1)	3.0 (37.4)	4.8 (40.6)	7.5 (45.5)	10.4 (50.7)	12.4 (54.3)	12.3 (54.1)	10.2 (50.4)	7.4 (45.3)	4.2 (39.6)	2.0 (35.6)	6.5 (43.7)
Record low °C (°F)	−13.3 (8.1)	−11.1 (12.0)	−10.6 (12.9)	−4.6 (23.7)	−2.1 (28.2)	1.0 (33.8)	4.4 (39.9)	4.5 (40.1)	0.9 (33.6)	−3.1 (26.4)	−9.2 (15.4)	−12.0 (10.4)	−13.3 (8.1)
Average precipitation mm (inches)	59.1 (2.33)	49.8 (1.96)	45.5 (1.79)	47.6 (1.87)	49.8 (1.96)	66.7 (2.63)	65.2 (2.57)	63.7 (2.51)	57.4 (2.26)	71.7 (2.82)	69.5 (2.74)	69.6 (2.74)	715.6 (28.17)
Average snowfall mm (inches)	10 (0.4)	19 (0.7)	5 (0.2)	1 (0.0)	0 (0)	0 (0)	0 (0)	0 (0)	0 (0)	0 (0)	2 (0.1)	5 (0.2)	42 (1.6)
Average precipitation days (≥ 1.0 mm)	11.6	10.9	10.1	9.4	9.0	9.8	9.4	9.5	9.8	11.2	12.7	12.3	125.9
Average snowy days	2.7	3.8	1.3	0.2	0.0	0.0	0.0	0.0	0.0	0.0	0.3	1.5	9.8
Average relative humidity (%)	89	86	82	81	81	83	79	78	81	85	88	90	84
Mean monthly sunshine hours	56.0	77.7	116.2	152.3	191.5	170.5	191.5	177.6	137.5	96.9	64.1	55.3	1,487
Mean daily daylight hours	8.2	9.9	11.9	14.0	15.9	16.8	16.3	14.7	12.7	10.6	8.7	7.7	12.3
Average ultraviolet index	2	2	3	3	4	4	4	4	4	3	2	2	3
Source 1: Met Office ECA&D
Source 2: CEDA Archive WeatherAtlas

Climate data for Sutton Bonington (Note: Weather station is located 9.0 miles (14.5 km) from the Nottingham city centre, and 11.1 miles (17.9 km) from the Derby city centre.) CDL ID: 99025; coordinates: 52°50′11″N 1°15′04″W; elevation: 48 m (157 ft); 1991–2020 normals, extremes 1924–present
Month	Jan	Feb	Mar	Apr	May	Jun	Jul	Aug	Sep	Oct	Nov	Dec	Year
Record high °C (°F)	15.8 (60.4)	17.9 (64.2)	22.9 (73.2)	26.5 (79.7)	32.3 (90.1)	34.8 (94.6)	39.4 (102.9)	36.1 (97.0)	30.9 (87.6)	28.8 (83.8)	20.0 (68.0)	15.9 (60.6)	39.4 (102.9)
Mean daily maximum °C (°F)	7.5 (45.5)	8.1 (46.6)	10.5 (50.9)	13.6 (56.5)	16.7 (62.1)	19.6 (67.3)	22.0 (71.6)	21.8 (71.2)	18.7 (65.7)	14.5 (58.1)	10.4 (50.7)	7.8 (46.0)	14.3 (57.7)
Daily mean °C (°F)	4.7 (40.5)	5.0 (41.0)	6.8 (44.2)	9.1 (48.4)	11.9 (53.4)	14.9 (58.8)	17.1 (62.8)	17.0 (62.6)	14.4 (57.9)	11.0 (51.8)	7.4 (45.3)	4.9 (40.8)	10.3 (50.5)
Mean daily minimum °C (°F)	1.9 (35.4)	1.9 (35.4)	3.0 (37.4)	4.6 (40.3)	7.2 (45.0)	10.1 (50.2)	12.1 (53.8)	12.2 (54.0)	10.1 (50.2)	7.5 (45.5)	4.4 (39.9)	2.1 (35.8)	6.5 (43.7)
Record low °C (°F)	−16.7 (1.9)	−17.8 (0.0)	−13.3 (8.1)	−6.7 (19.9)	−4.4 (24.1)	−1.1 (30.0)	1.7 (35.1)	1.1 (34.0)	−1.8 (28.8)	−6.7 (19.9)	−9.9 (14.2)	−15.3 (4.5)	−17.8 (0.0)
Average precipitation mm (inches)	50.7 (2.00)	41.2 (1.62)	40.6 (1.60)	44.3 (1.74)	46.3 (1.82)	63.7 (2.51)	61.8 (2.43)	54.6 (2.15)	49.2 (1.94)	62.7 (2.47)	56.9 (2.24)	58.1 (2.29)	630.0 (24.80)
Average precipitation days (≥ 1.0 mm)	10.9	9.6	9.6	9.6	8.9	9.5	9.6	8.6	8.9	10.4	11.0	11.7	118.3
Mean monthly sunshine hours	51.6	76.1	115.6	152.0	182.9	161.8	190.1	175.6	136.7	100.8	61.5	47.7	1,452.4
Source 1: Met Office
Source 2: CEDA Archive Starlings Roost Weather

== City centre ==
The city centre of Nottingham is usually defined as the Old Market Square. The square is dominated by the Council House, which was built in the 1920s to replace the Nottingham Exchange. The Council House has baroque columns and two stone lion statues in the front to stand watch over the square. The Exchange Arcade, on the ground floor, is a shopping centre.

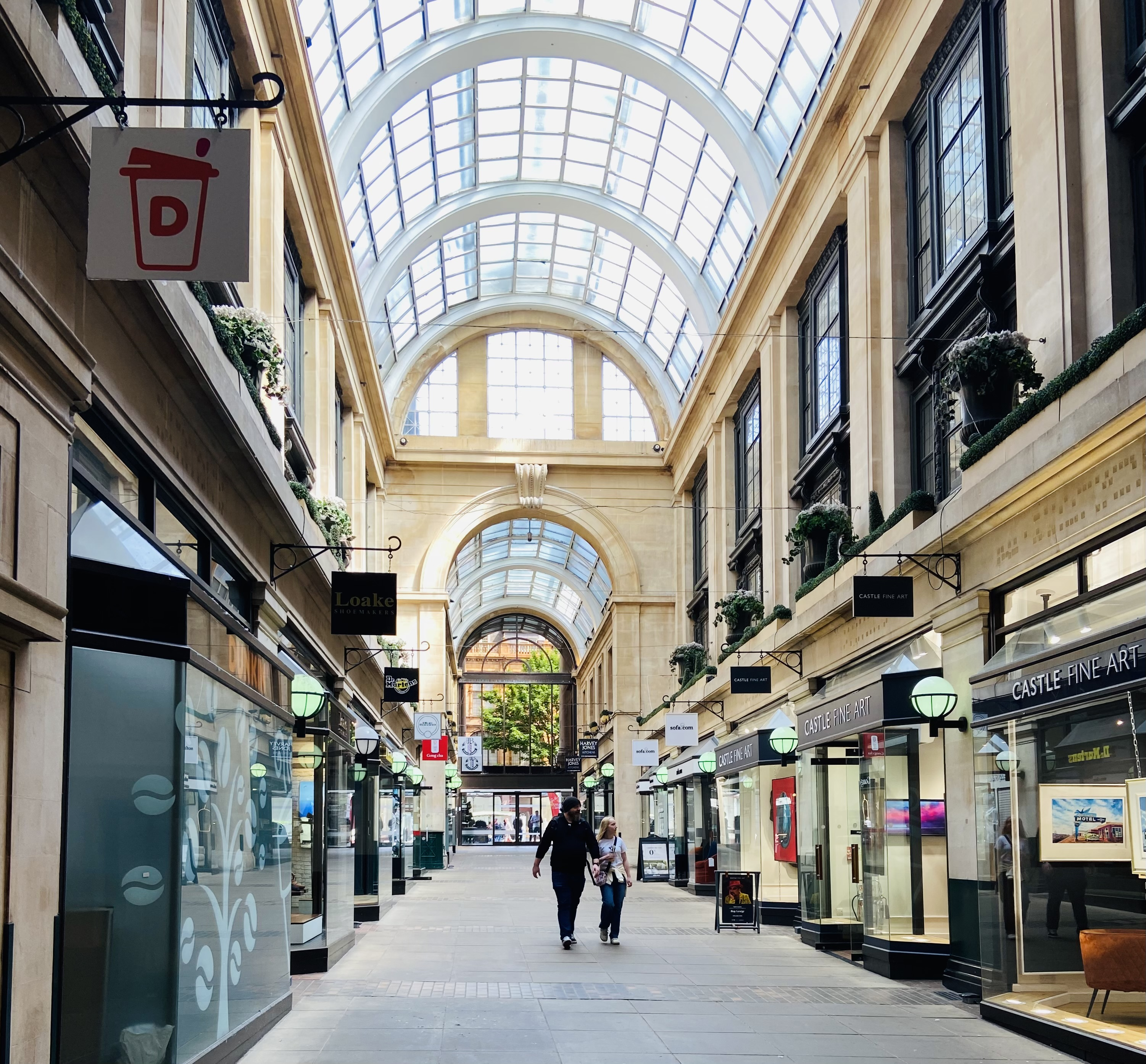
Exchange Arcade, Nottingham Council House

Tall office buildings line Maid Marian Way. The Georgian area around Oxford and Regent Streets is dominated by small professional firms. The Albert Hall faces the Gothic revival St Barnabas' Roman Catholic Cathedral by Pugin. Nottingham Castle and its grounds are located further south in the western third of the city. The central third descends from the university district in the north, past Nottingham Trent University's Gothic revival Arkwright Building. The university also owns many other buildings in this area.

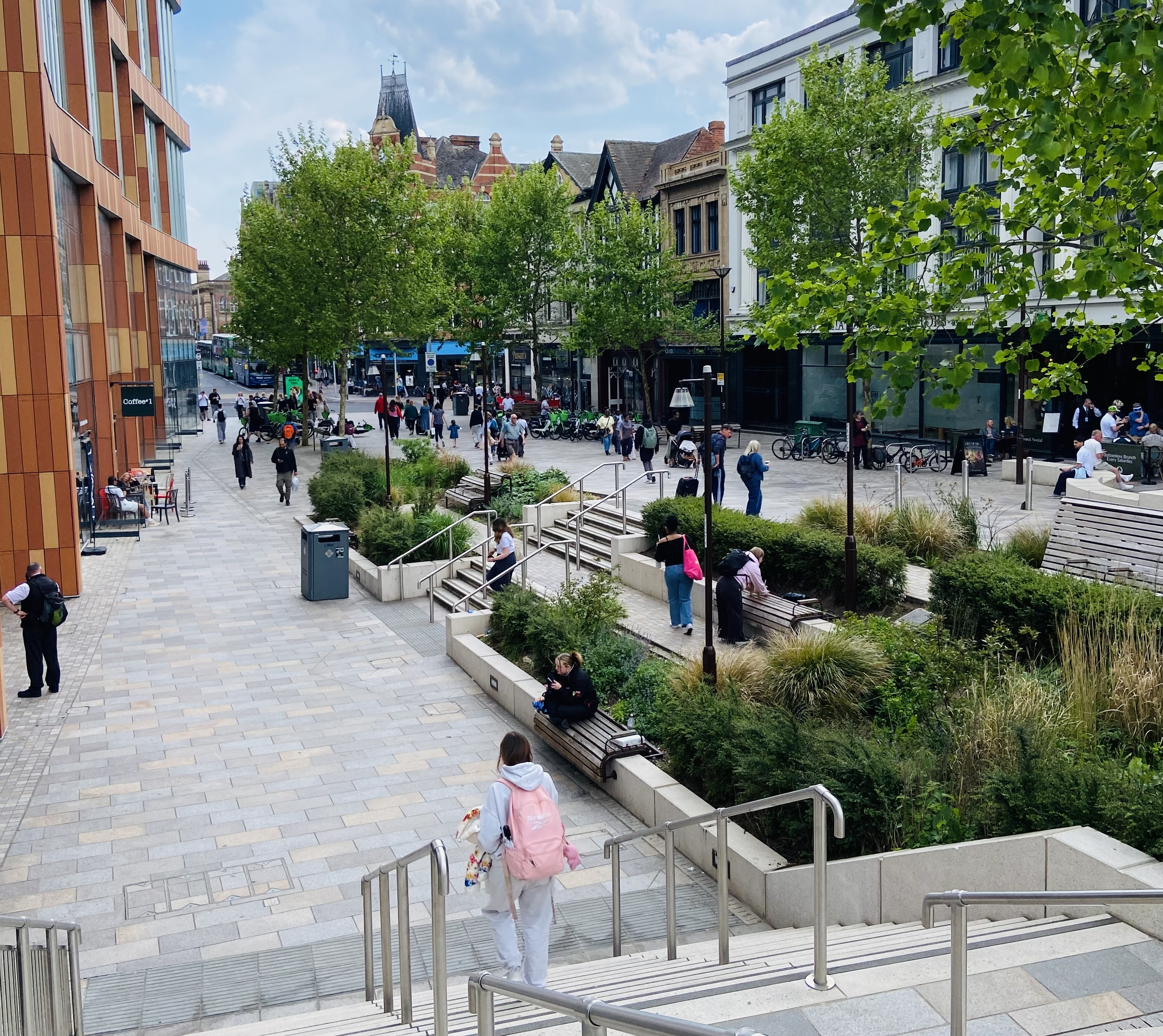
Carrington Street

The Theatre Royal on Theatre Square, with its pillared façade, was built in 1865. King and Queen Streets are home to striking Victorian buildings designed by such architects as Alfred Waterhouse and Watson Fothergill.

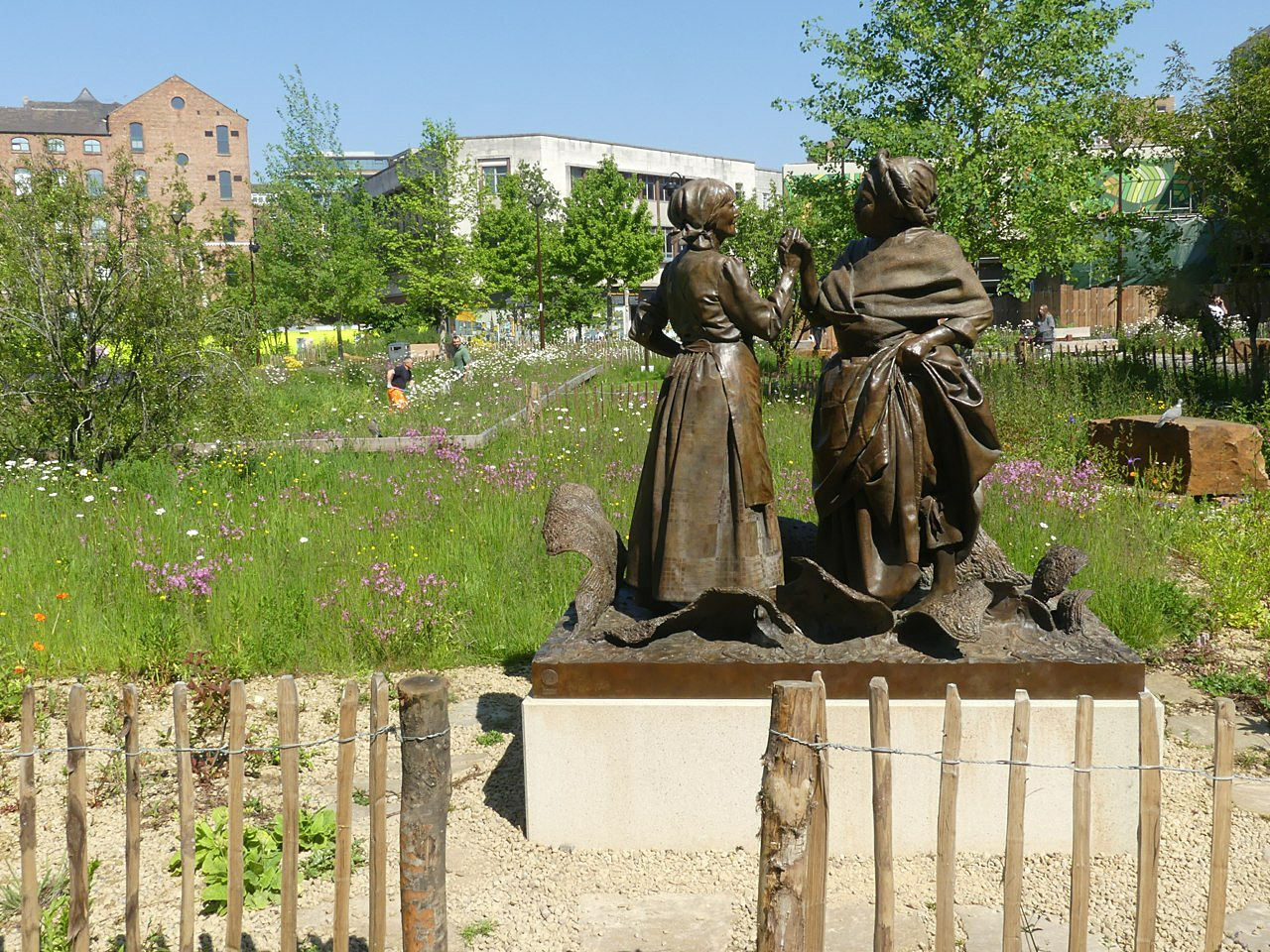
An African-Caribbean farm worker and British mill worker clasping hands in greeting statue in the green heart.

The eastern third of the city contains Hockley Village, with specialist and independent shops. The Victoria Centre is also in the area; it was built in the 1970s on the demolished Victoria railway station site. All that remains of the old station is the station hotel and clock tower. The 250-foot-high Victoria Centre flats stand above the shopping centre and are the tallest buildings in the city.

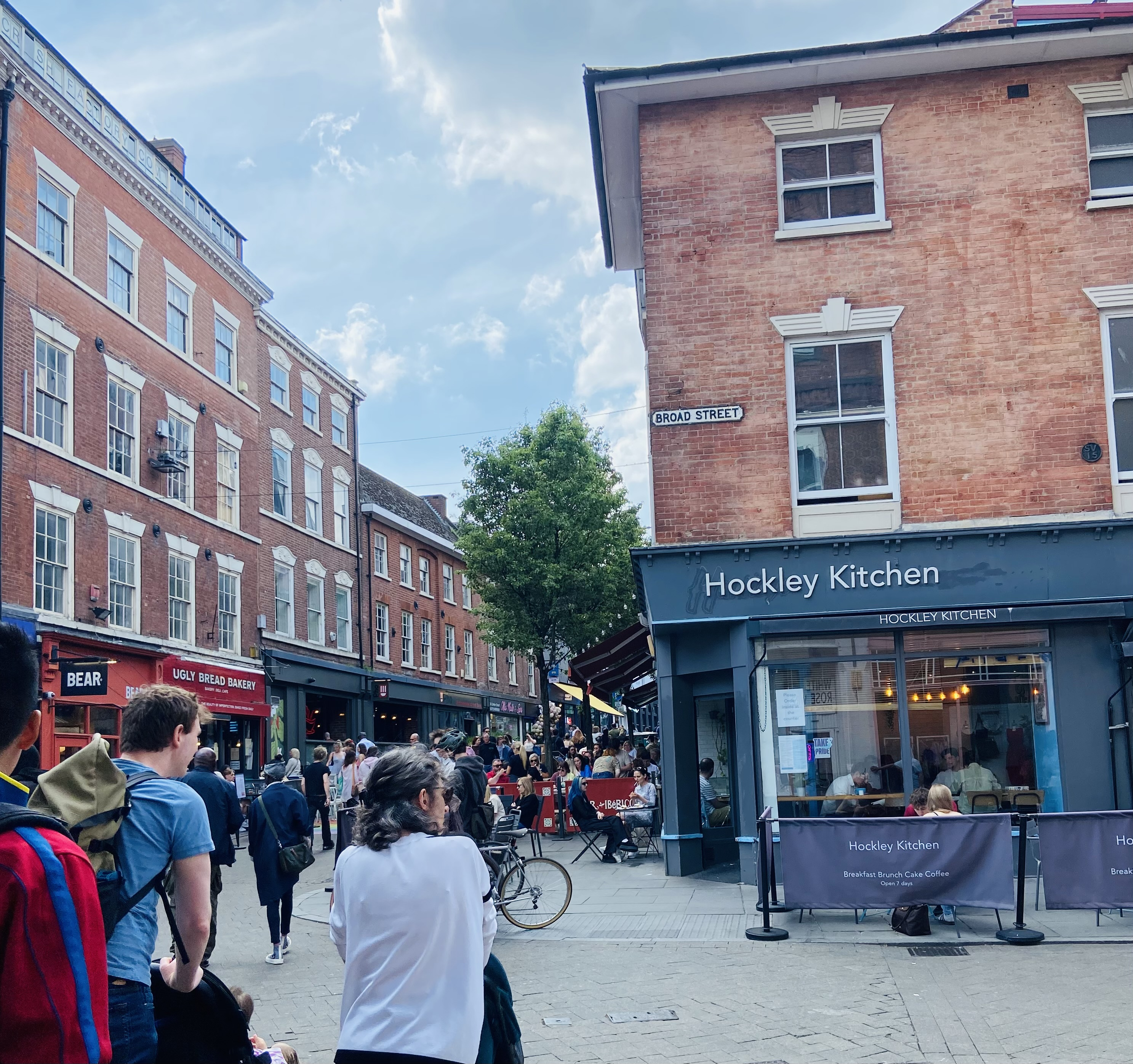
Broad Street, Hockley

The canal-side to the south of the city is adjacent to Nottingham railway station and home to multiple repurposed (as bars and restaurants) 19th-century industrial buildings.

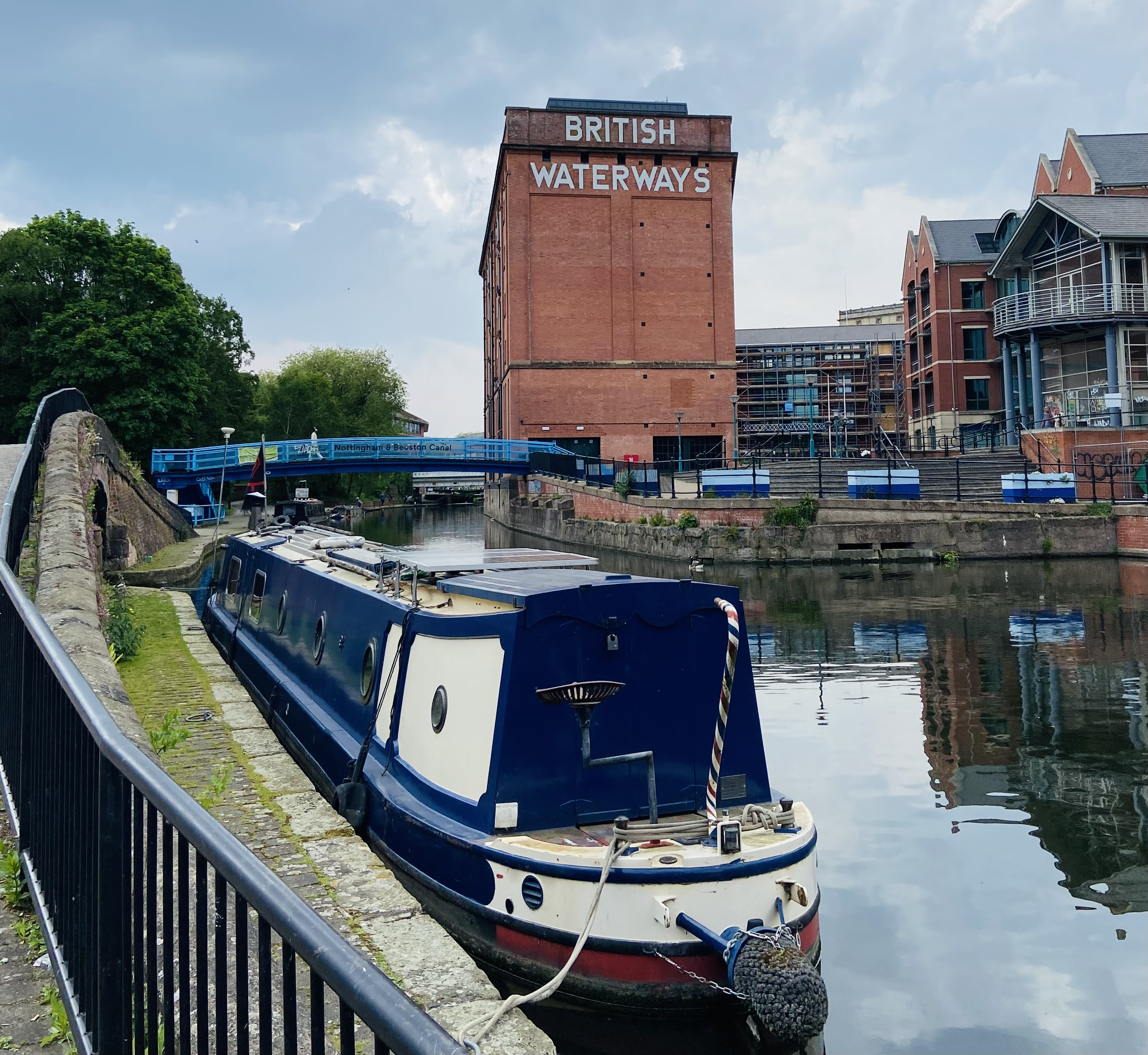
Canal-Side, Nottingham

=== Lace Market ===
The Lace Market area just south of Hockley has streets with four- to seven-storey red brick warehouses, iron railings and red phone boxes.

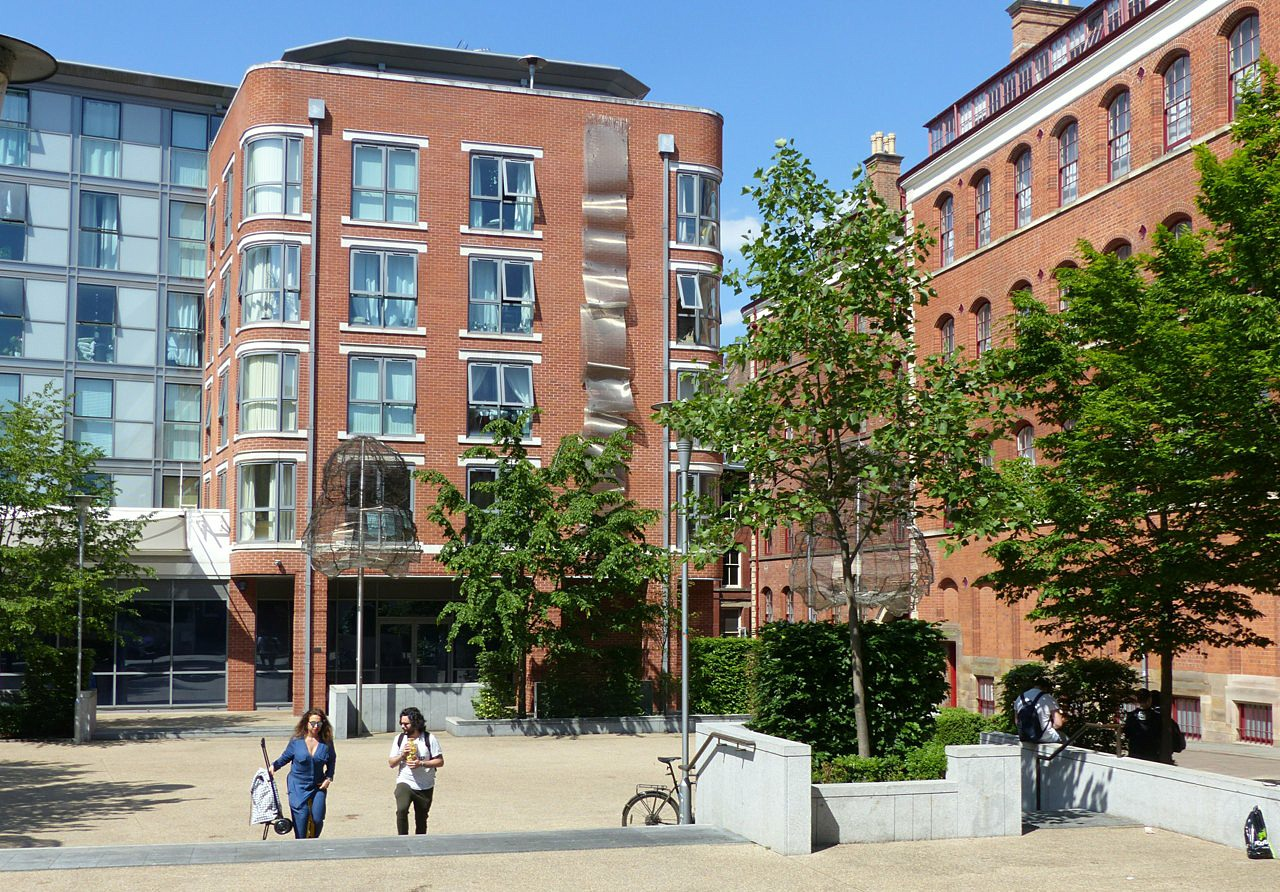
Lace Market Square

Many of the buildings have been converted into apartments, bars and restaurants. The largest building in the Lace Market is the Adams Building, built by Thomas Chambers Hine for Thomas Adams (1807–1873), and currently used by Nottingham College. The Georgian-built Shire Hall, which was once Nottingham's main court and prison building, is now home to the National Justice Museum (formerly the "Galleries of Justice").

=== Public houses ===
Ye Olde Trip To Jerusalem (the Trip), partially built into the cave system beneath Nottingham Castle, is a contender for the title of England's Oldest Pub, as it is supposed to have been established in 1189.

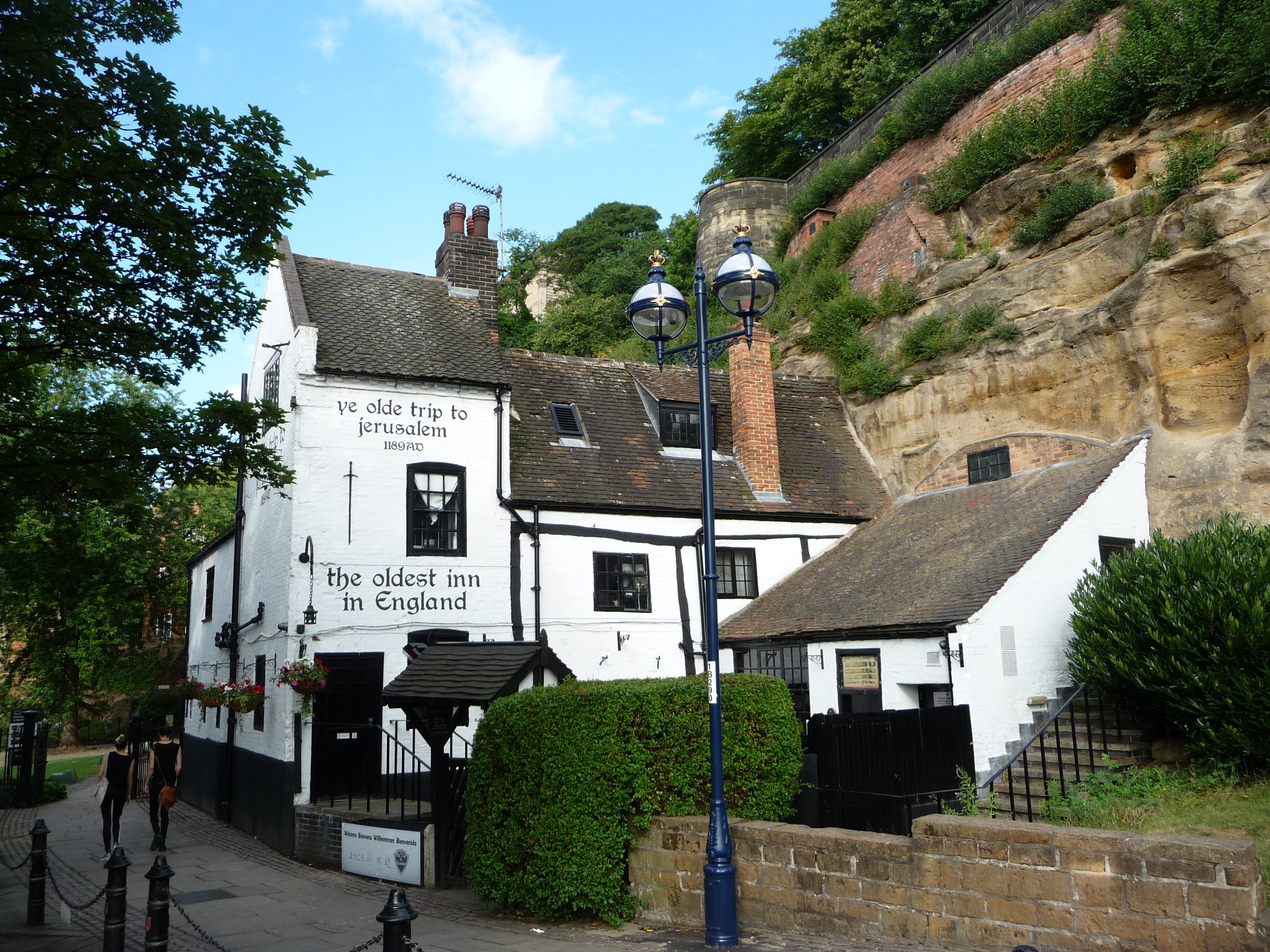
Ye Olde Trip to Jerusalem

The Bell Inn in the Old Market Square and Ye Olde Salutation Inn (the Salutation) in Maid Marian Way have both disputed this claim. The Trip's current timber building probably dates back to the 17th or 18th century but the caves are certainly older and may have been used to store beer and water for the castle during medieval times. There are also caves beneath the Salutation that date back to the medieval period, although they are no longer used as beer cellars. The Bell Inn is probably the oldest of the three pub buildings still standing, according to dendrochronology, and has medieval cellars that are still used to store beer.

== Education ==
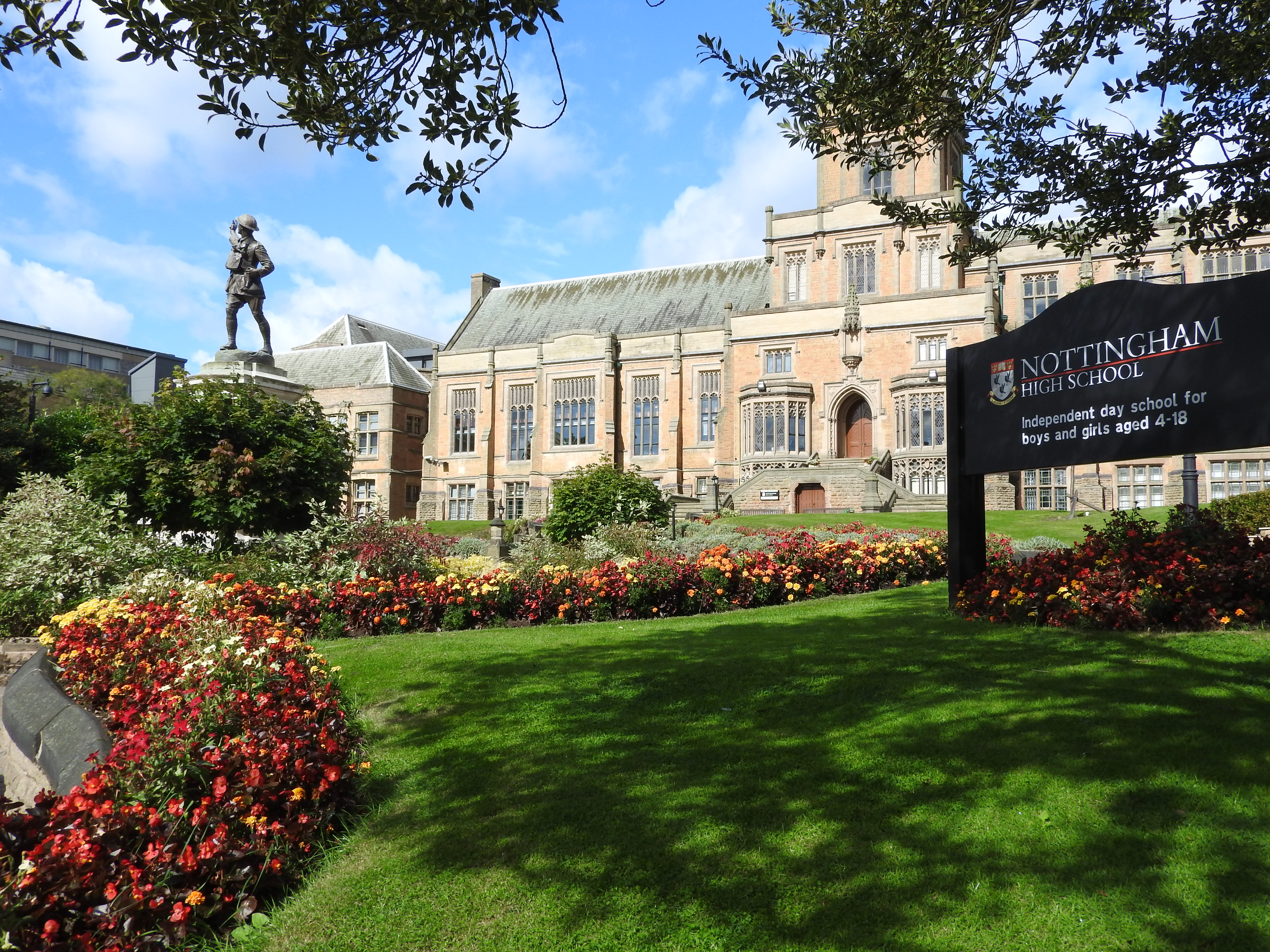
Nottingham High School

Almost 62,000 students attend the city's three universities, Nottingham Trent University, the University of Law and the University of Nottingham; in the 2016/17 academic year, Trent University was attended by 29,370 students and Nottingham University by 32,515. The University of Nottingham Medical School is part of the Queen's Medical Centre.

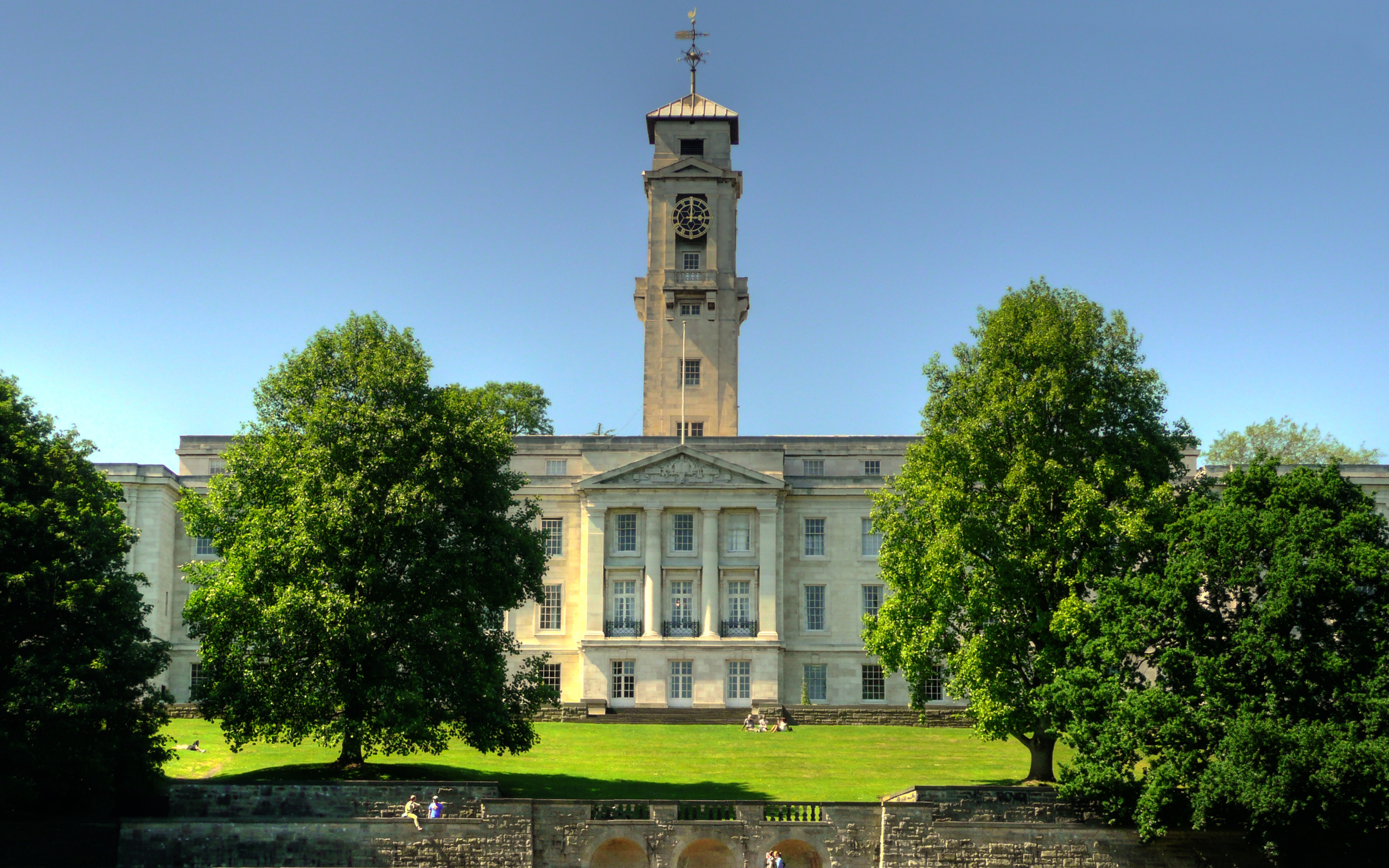
The Trent Building University of Nottingham

There are three colleges of further education in Nottingham: Bilborough College is solely a sixth form college; Nottingham College was formed in 2017 by the amalgamation of Central College Nottingham and New College Nottingham (which had both previously formed from the merger of smaller FE colleges); and the Confetti Institute of Creative Technologies, owned by Nottingham Trent University, is a further-education college that specialises in media. The city has dozens of sixth-form colleges and academies, providing education and training for adults aged over sixteen.

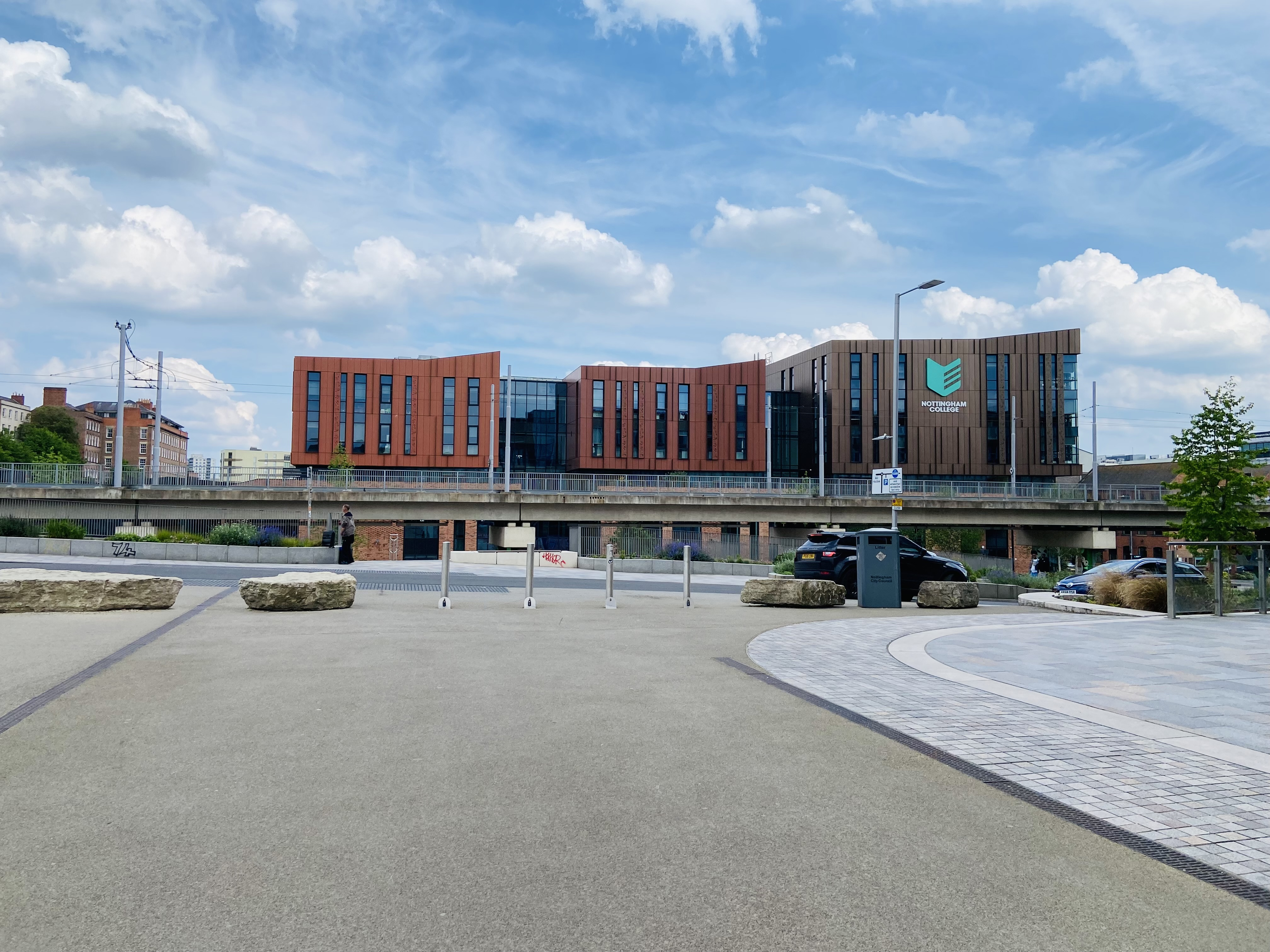
Nottingham College

Nottingham also has a number of independent schools. The city's oldest educational establishment is Nottingham High School, a day school founded in 1513. The school used to be for boys only but became coeducational in 2015. Nottingham Girls' High School is another independent school but for girls only. Founded in 1875, it is now part of the Girls' Day School Trust (GDST).

=== Museums ===
The city contains several notable museums including:

- National Justice Museum – Museum of Law, Crime and Punishment through the ages, based at the Shire Hall in the Lace Market.
- City of Caves – A visitor attraction consisting of a network of man-made caves, carved out of sandstone, beneath the Broadmarsh.

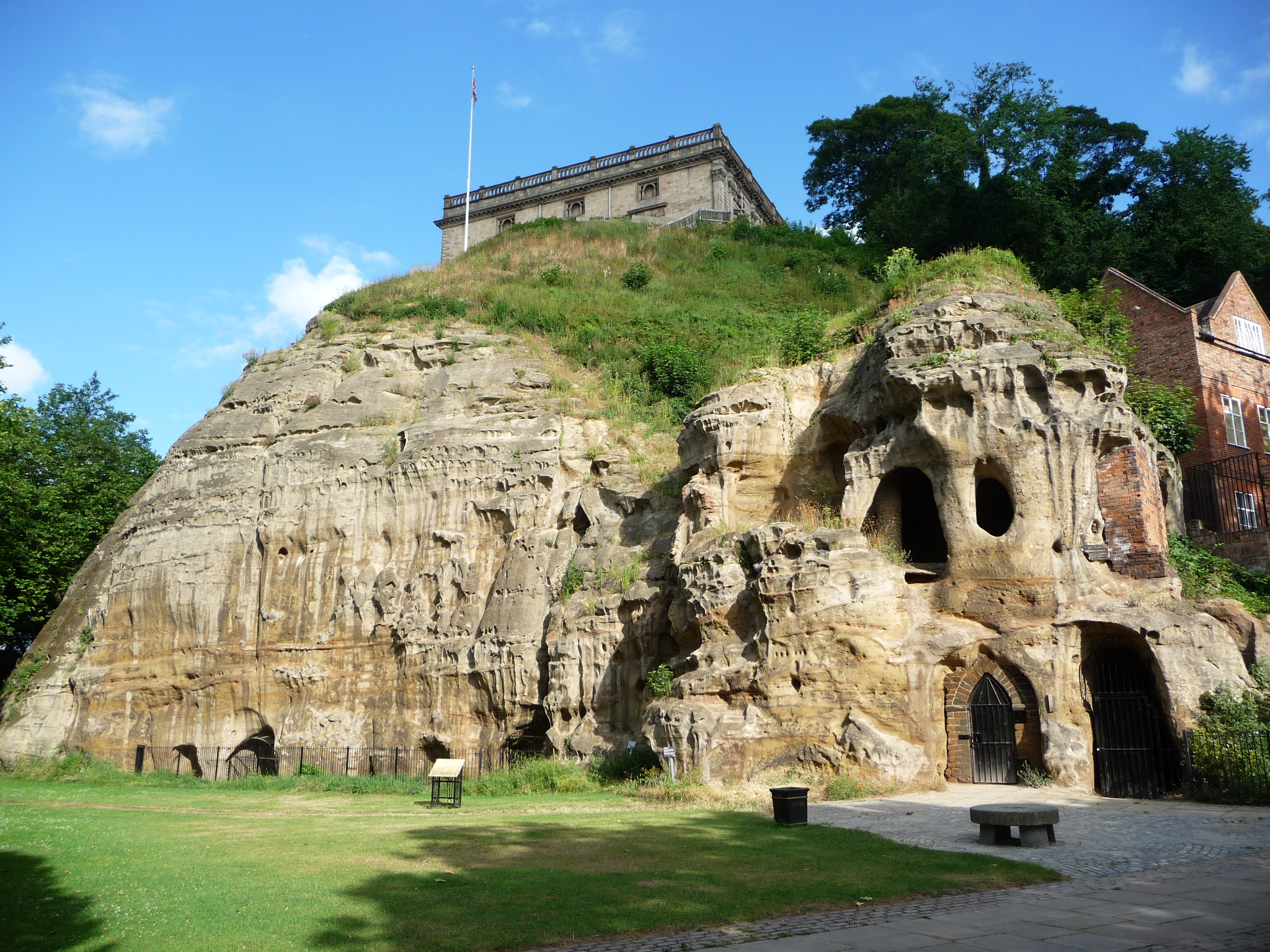
City of Caves

- Green's Mill, Sneinton and Science Centre – A unique working windmill in the heart of the city, which was home to the 19th-century mathematical physicist and miller George Green.
- William Booth Birthplace Museum, also in Sneinton, birthplace of William Booth, cofounder of the Salvation Army, open by appointment.

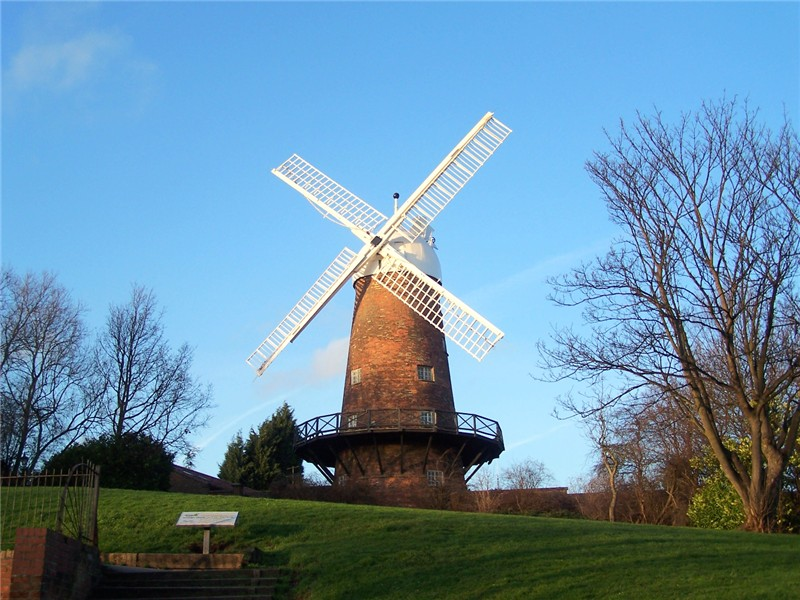
Green's Mill, Sneinton

- Nottingham Castle Museum – Home to the city's fine and decorative art collections, along with the Story of Nottingham galleries and the Sherwood Foresters Regimental Museum.
- Nottingham Industrial Museum – Housed in Wollaton Park, collections relating to textiles, transport, communications, mining and steam.
- Nottingham Natural History Museum – Based at Wollaton Hall, contains zoology, geology and botany collections.

In 2015 the National Videogame Arcade was opened in the Hockley area of the city; being "the UK's first cultural centre for videogames". It was announced in June 2018 that the arcade was soon to close and relocate to Sheffield city centre, where it reopened in November 2018 as the National Videogame Museum.

== Economy ==
Nottingham is the East Midlands' largest economy. Although not within the Nottingham city boundary, areas around the city are affluent and commuter belt for the city. Rushcliffe in 2025 out of 543 parliamentary constituencies came out at 538, making the area one of the most affluent constituencies in England.

The headquarters of several large companies are based in the city: these include Alliance Boots (formerly Boots the Chemists); Chinook Sciences; GM (cricket bats); Pedigree Petfoods; VF Corporation (American clothing); Changan Automobile (Chinese-made automobiles); the credit reference agency Experian; energy company E.ON Energy UK; betting company Gala Bingo; amusement and gambling machine manufacturer Bell-Fruit-Games; engineering company Siemens; sportswear manufacturers Speedo; high-street opticians Vision Express and Specsavers; games and publishing company Games Workshop; PC software developer Serif Europe (publisher of PagePlus and other titles); web hosting provider Heart Internet; the American credit card company Capital One.

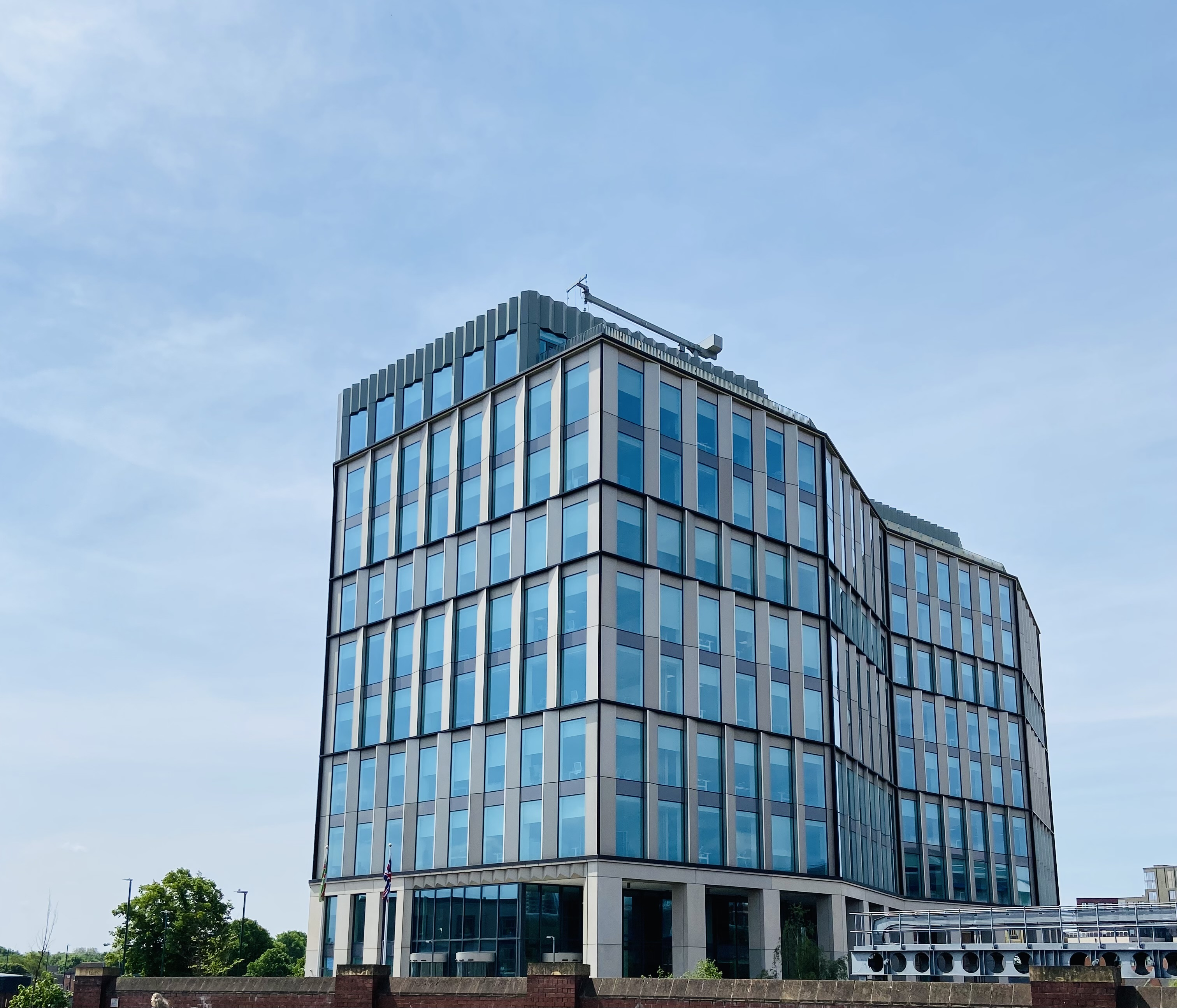
Unity Square

Other companies based in Nottingham include the national law firm Browne Jacobson; and Earache Records, an independent music company founded by local resident Digby Pearson, based on Handel Street in Sneinton. Nottingham also has offices of Nottingham Building Society (established 1849); HM Revenue & Customs; the Driving Standards Agency; Ofsted; the Care Quality Commission and BBC East Midlands. The schools and aerial photographers, H Tempest Ltd, were Nottingham-based for many years, until relocating to St Ives, Cornwall January 1959.

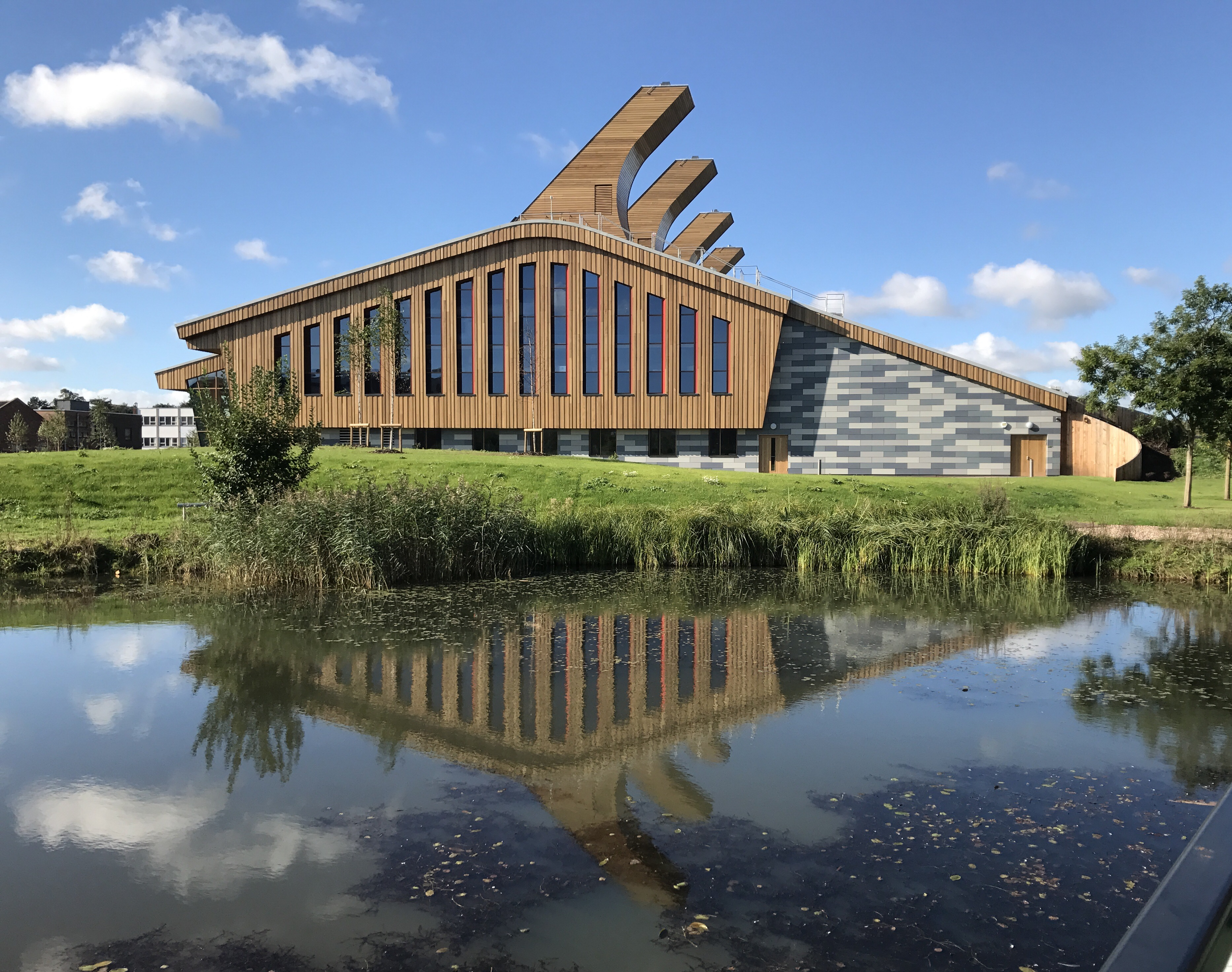
GlaxoSmithKline carbon neutral building at the Jubilee Campus, University of Nottingham

Nottingham was named one of the UK's six science cities in 2005 by the then Chancellor of the Exchequer Gordon Brown. Among the science-based industries within the city is BioCity. Founded as a joint venture between Nottingham Trent University and the University of Nottingham, it is the UK's biggest bioscience innovation and incubation centre, housing around 80 science-based companies. In 2010, Nottingham City Council announced that the target sectors of their economic development strategy would include low-carbon technologies; digital media; life sciences; financial and business services; and retail and leisure.

Economic trends
Year	Regional gross value added (£M)	Agriculture (£M)	Industry (£M)	Services (£M)
1995	4,149	2	1,292	2,855
2000	5,048	1	912	4,135
2003	5,796	–	967	4,828
Source: Office for National Statistics

The city formerly had a major bicycle manufacturing industry sector. Raleigh Bicycle Company was established in 1886 and Sturmey-Archer, the developer of three-speed hub gears, was also founded in the city. Raleigh's factory on Triumph Road, famous as the filming location of Saturday Night and Sunday Morning, was demolished in 2003 to make way for the University of Nottingham Jubilee Campus's expansion.

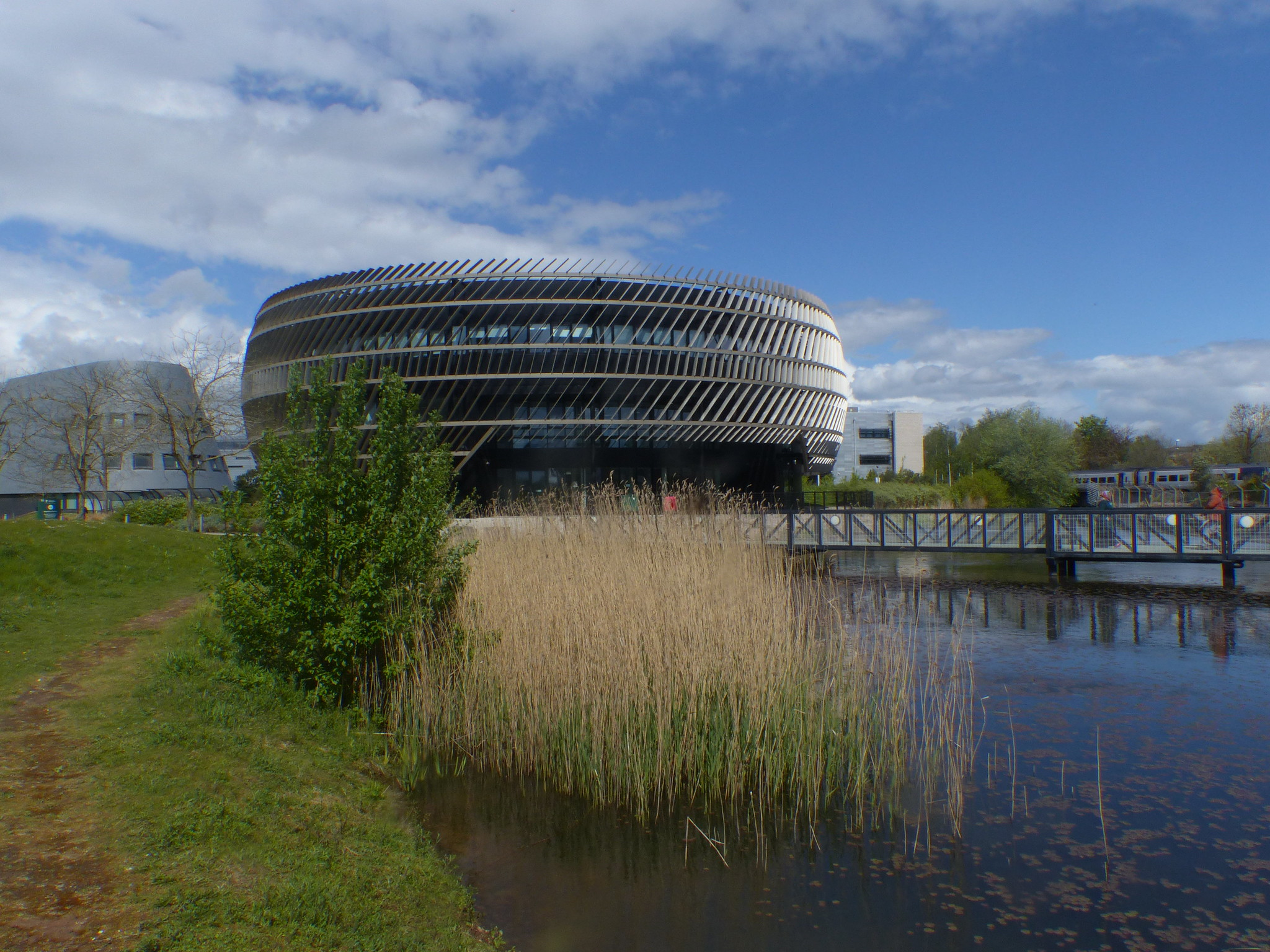
Ingenuity Centre, Jubilee Campus

In 2015, Nottingham was ranked in the top 10 UK cities for job growth (from 2004 to 2013), in the public and private sectors. and in the same year, it was revealed that more new companies were started in Nottingham in 2014–15 than in any other UK city, with a 68% year-on-year increase. In 2017, Nottingham came seventh in Harper Dennis Hobbes's Top 50 British Centres, behind the West End of London, Glasgow, Birmingham, Manchester, Leeds and Liverpool.

=== Retail ===
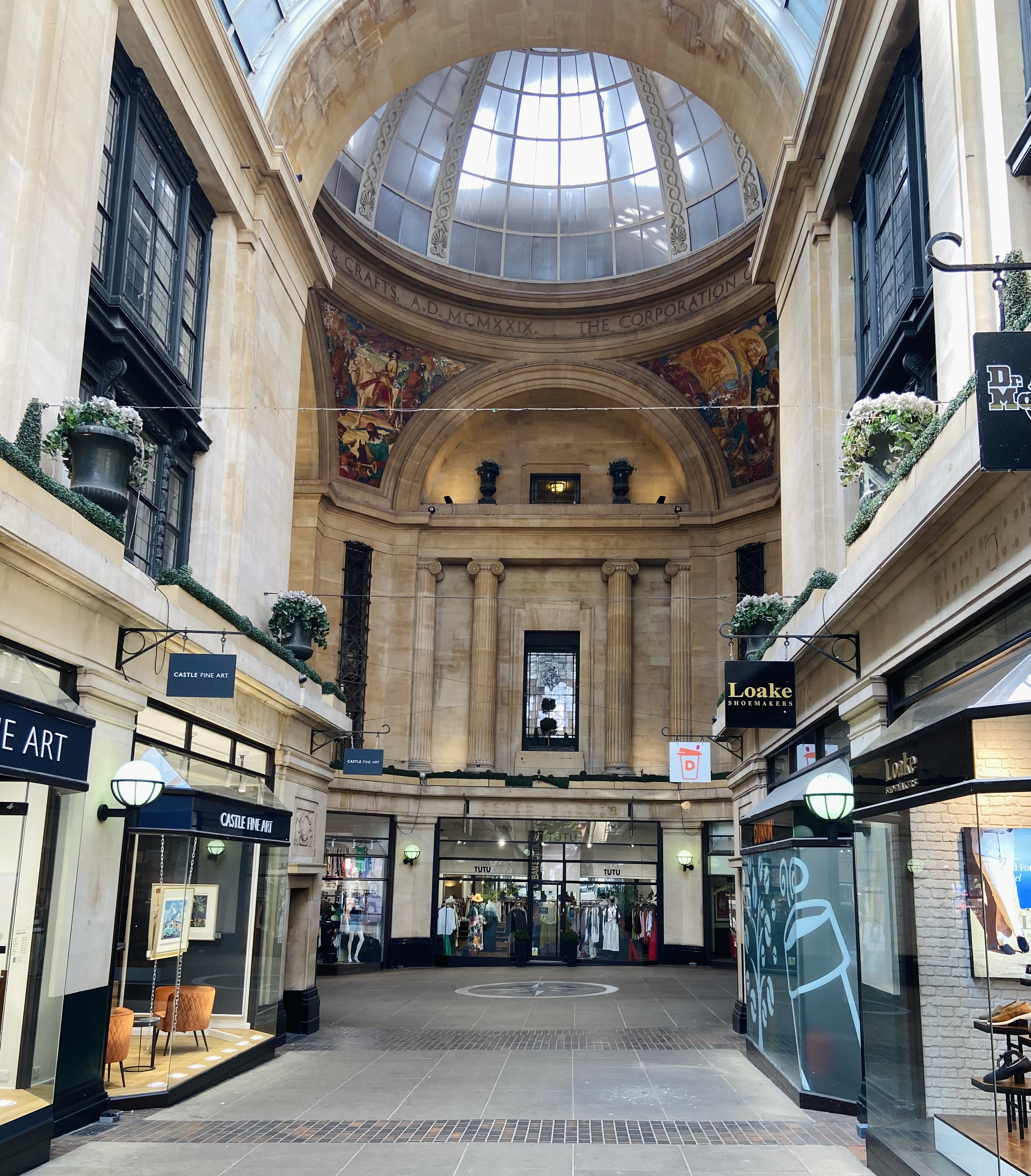
The Exchange Arcade inside the Council House

The Bridlesmith Gate area has numerous designer shops, one being the original Paul Smith boutique. There are various specialist shops and small businesses in side streets and alleys: notable streets include Poultry Walk, West End Arcade and Hurts Yard and Derby Road (the latter once known for antiques). Smaller shopping areas in the city are the older Flying Horse Walk, The Exchange Arcade, Hockley and newer Trinity Square and The Pod.

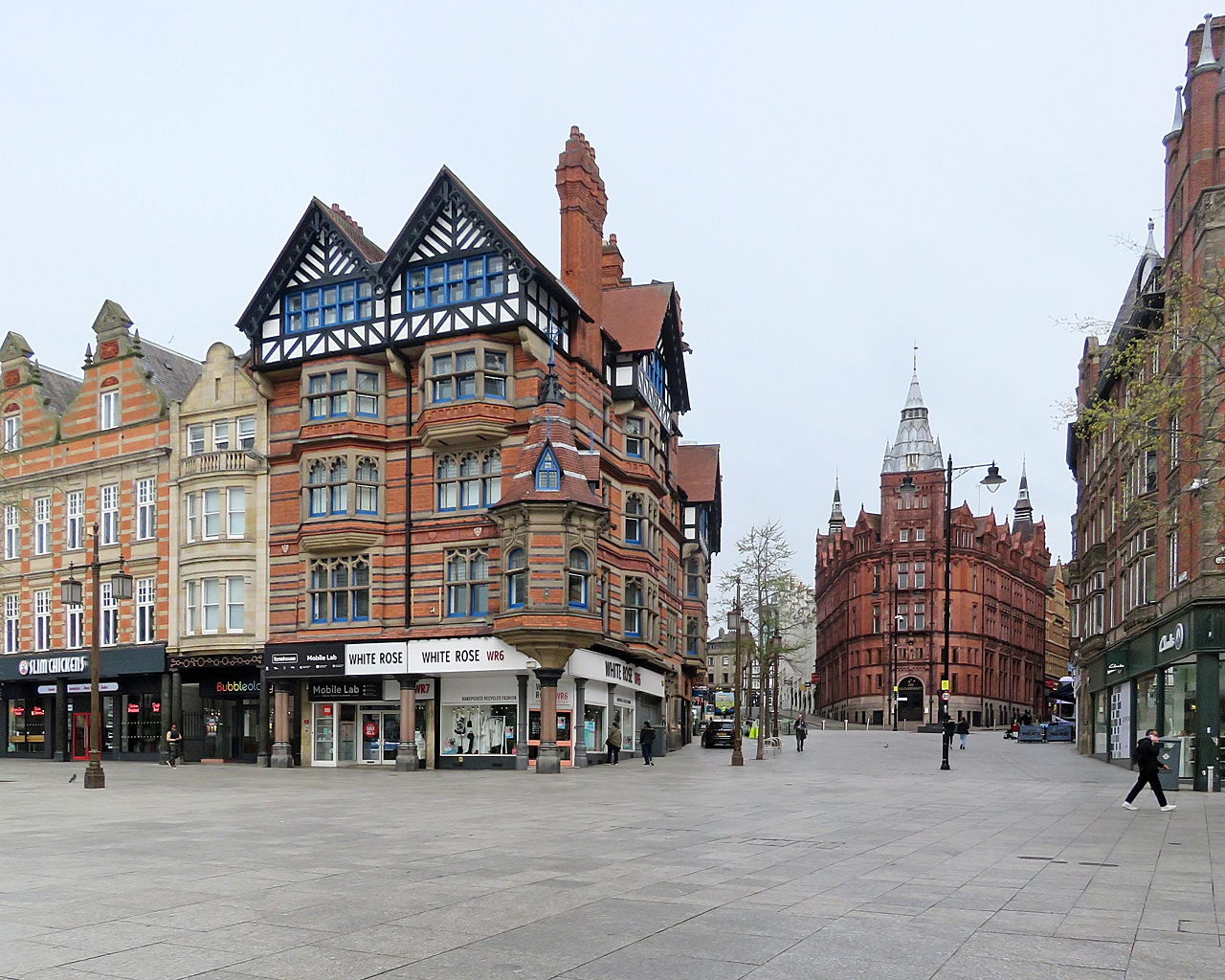
Looking towards King Street

Nottingham's Victoria Centre is the city's main retail shopping centre: it was the first to be built in the city and was developed on the site of the former Nottingham Victoria railway station.

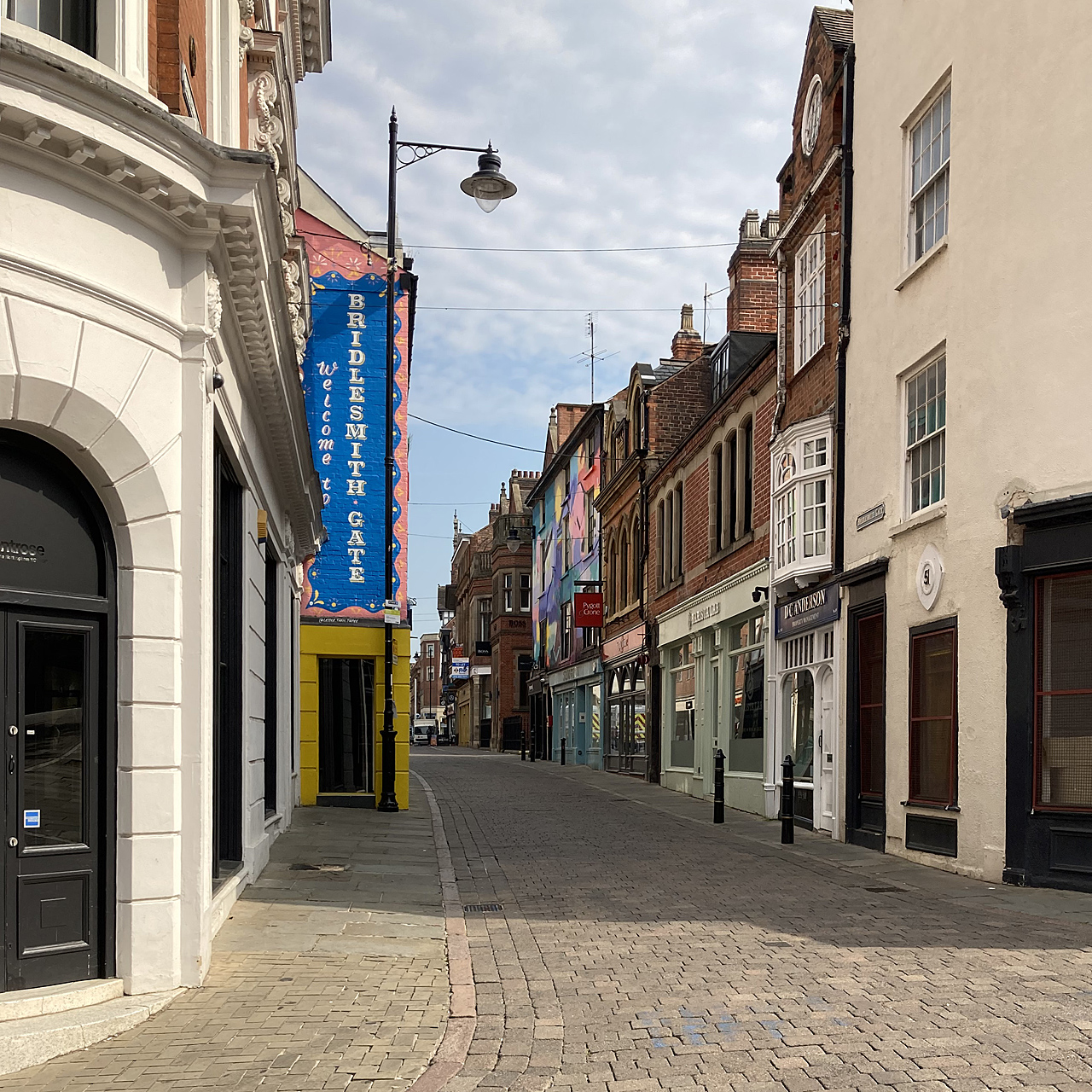
Bridlesmith Gate

=== Enterprise zone ===
In March 2011, the government announced the creation of Nottingham Enterprise Zone, an enterprise zone sited on part of the Boots Estate. In March 2012, Nottingham Science Park, Beeston Business Park and Nottingham Medipark were added to the zone. In December 2014, the government announced that the zone would be expanded again, to include Infinity Park Derby, a planned business park for aerospace, rail and automotive technology adjacent to the Rolls-Royce site in Sinfin, Derby.

=== Creative Quarter ===
The Creative Quarter is a project started by Nottingham City Council as part of the Nottingham City Deal. Centred on the east of the city (including the Lace Market, Hockley, Broadmarsh East, the Island site and BioCity), the project aims at creating growth and jobs. In July 2012, the government contributed £25 million towards a £45 million venture capital fund, mainly targeted at the Creative Quarter.

== Culture ==
=== Library ===
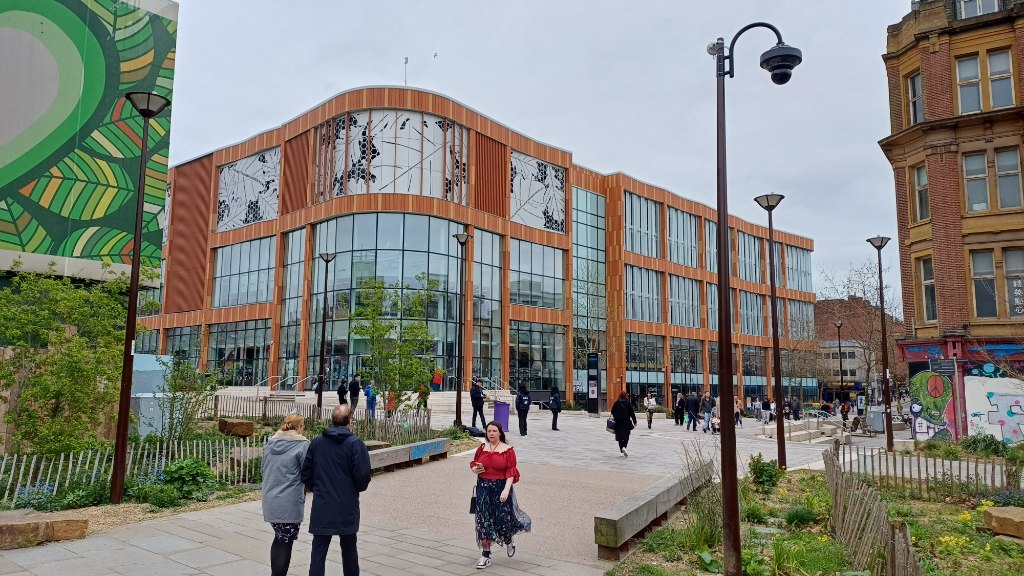
Nottingham Central Library

Nottingham Central Library opened in November 2023 at a cost of more than £10 million and provides books, computer access and other public services.

=== Art Galleries ===
Galleries include Nottingham Contemporary art centre in the Lace Market, opened in 2009, and New Art Exchange contemporary art gallery, the largest in the UK dedicated to showing diverse artists, opened in 2008.

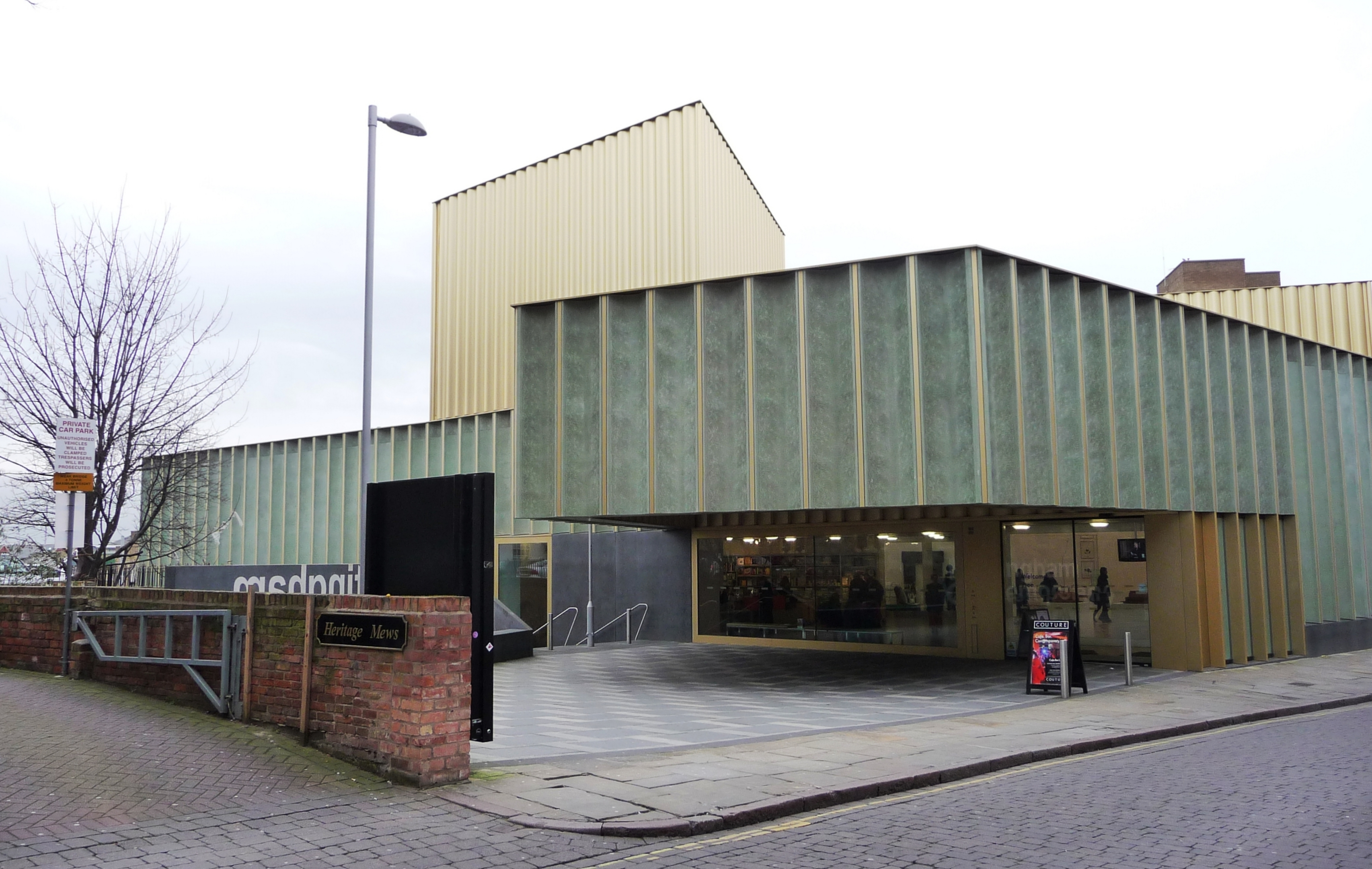
Nottingham Contemporary

=== Public art ===
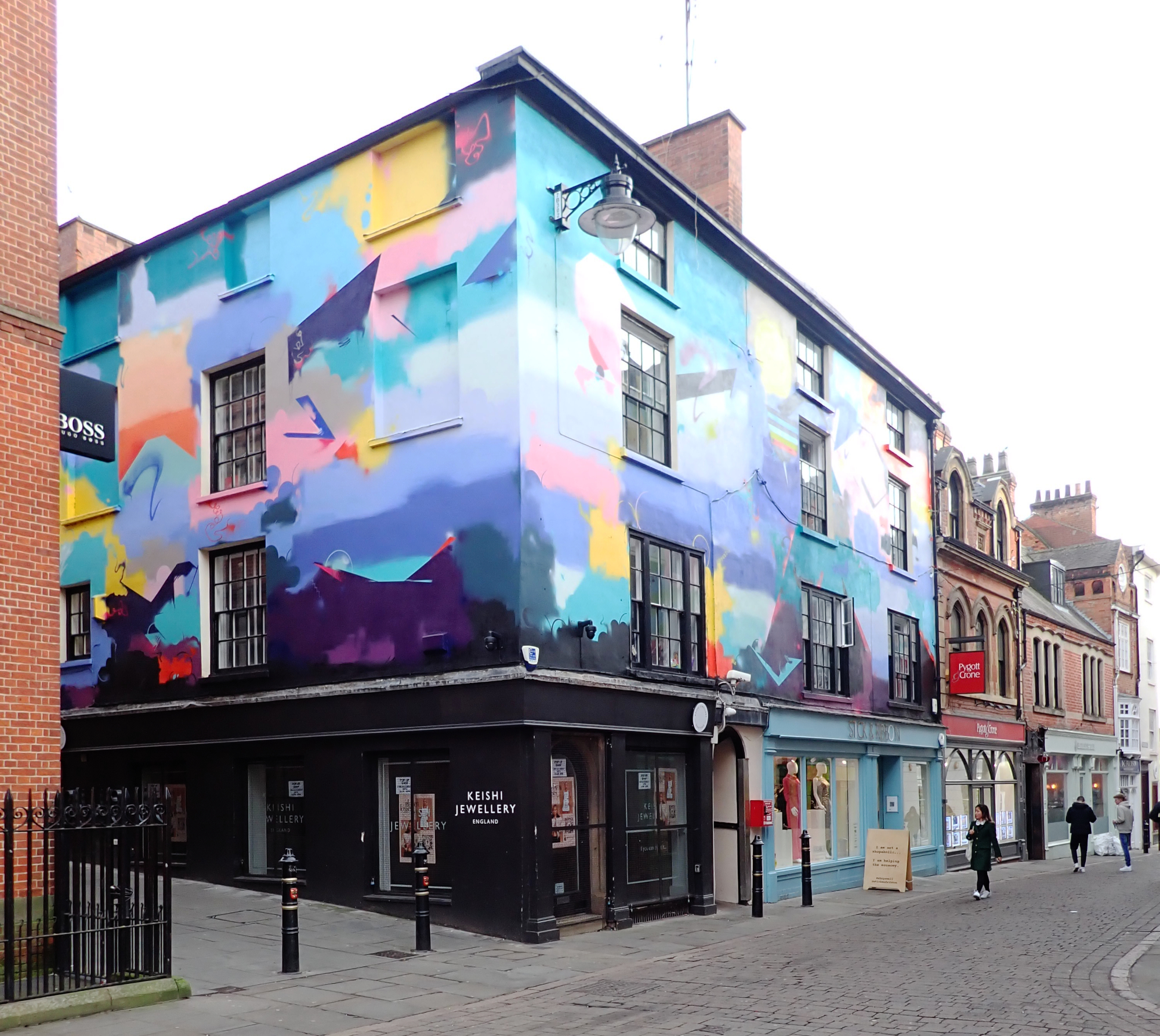
The mural on Bridlesmith Gate, by Emily Catherine

Nottingham has a range of public artworks across the city, largely from the twentieth century. These include traditional statues such as Robin Hood by James Woodford, and Lee Johnson's statue of Brian Clough. Contemporary artwork includes Anish Kapoor's Sky Mirror at Nottingham Playhouse, and Aspire by Ken Shuttleworth at the University of Nottingham. In 2018, Nottingham City Council commissioned three new artworks on the site of Lenton Priory. These include 'Lenton Priory Stone' by James Winnet based the carvings on the 12th century Norman baptismal font from the Priory, and the 'Lenton Priory Pillars' by Adrian Riley.

=== Venues ===
Nottingham has two large-capacity theatres, the Nottingham Playhouse and the Theatre Royal, which together with the neighbouring Royal Concert Hall forms the Royal Centre. The city also contains smaller theatre venues such as the Nottingham Arts Theatre, the Lace Market Theatre, New Theatre and Nonsuch Studios.

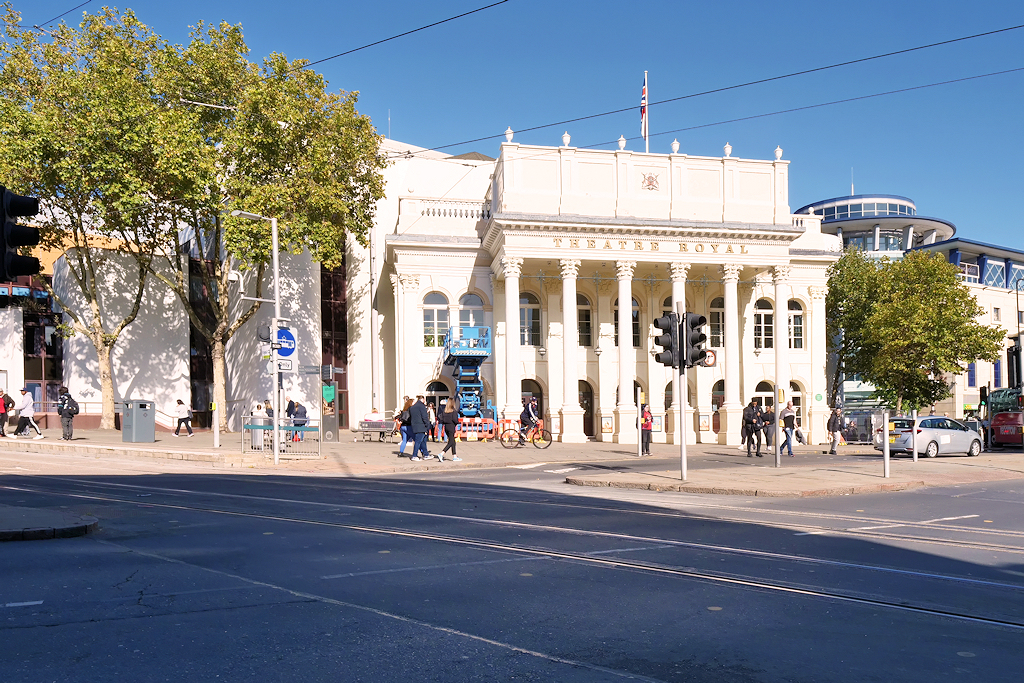
Theatre Royal

There is a Vue International and a Showcase in the city. Independent cinemas include the Arthouse Broadway Cinema in Hockley, and the four-screen Art Deco Savoy Cinema.

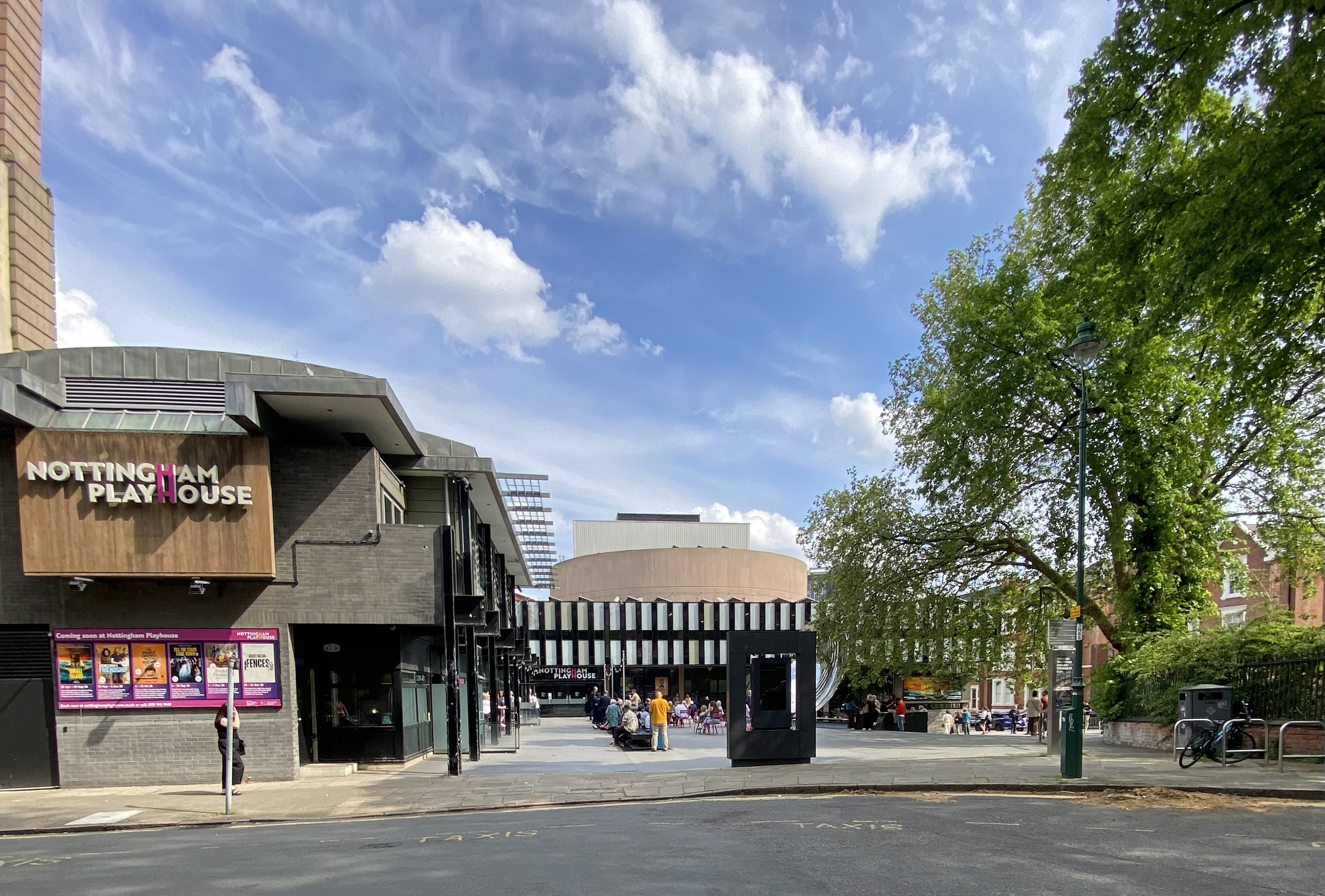
Nottingham Playhouse

Nottingham has several large music and entertainment venues including the Royal Concert Hall (2,500 capacity), Rock City and the Nottingham Arena (Social centre). Nottingham's City Ground played host to rock band R.E.M with Idlewild and The Zutons supporting in 2005, the first time a concert had been staged at the football stadium.

Nottingham also has a selection of smaller venues, including the Albert Hall (800-capacity), Ye Olde Salutation Inn, Malt Cross, Rescue Rooms, the Bodega, the Old Angel, the Central, the Chameleon and the Corner.

=== Music ===
1960s blues-rock band Ten Years After formed in Nottingham, as did the 1970s pop act Paper Lace, the Tindersticks, electronic music groups Stereo MC's, Bent, and Crazy P, as well as folk singer Anne Briggs. Since the beginning of the 2010s, the city has produced a number of artists to gain media attention, including; Sleaford Mods, Jake Bugg, London Grammar, Indiana, Bru-C, Saint Raymond, Childhood, Kagoule, Rue Royale, Spotlight Kid, Divorce, ALT BLK ERA and Amber Run.

Nottingham is home to Earache Records, a large independent record label setup in Nottingham in 1986 and home to artists such as Napalm Death, Carcass, Entombed and Rival Sons.

The city has an active classical music scene, with long-established ensembles such as the city's Symphony Orchestra, Philharmonic Orchestra, Nottingham Harmonic Society, Bach Choir, Early Music Group Musica Donum Dei and the Symphonic Wind Orchestra giving regular performances in the city. The Sumac Centre is a social centre in Forest Fields.

Nottingham is known for its hip-hop scene. Audio Recording Studios opened in 2013, on the site of a former square known as "Milk Square" which was known to have hosted musicians, bands and orchestras in the 1800s. Since opening, the studios have hosted musicians and actors from various places including involvement in Hollywood films, and British rock band Spiritualized's album And Nothing Hurt. The studios are a base for rapper and producer Sway Dasafo's New Reign Productions and Jake Bugg's manager, Jason Hart. The rock band Church of the Cosmic Skull are from Nottingham.

=== Annual events ===
Wollaton Park in Nottingham hosts an annual family-friendly music event called Splendour. In 2009 it was headlined by Madness and the Pogues. The following year it was headlined by the Pet Shop Boys and featured, among others, Calvin Harris, Noisettes, Athlete and OK Go. In 2011, it featured headline acts Scissor Sisters, Blondie, Eliza Doolittle and Feeder. In 2012, performers included Dizzee Rascal, Razorlight, Katy B and Hard-Fi. In 2014, Wollaton Park hosted the first-ever No Tomorrow Festival, featuring artists including Sam Smith, London Grammar and Clean Bandit.

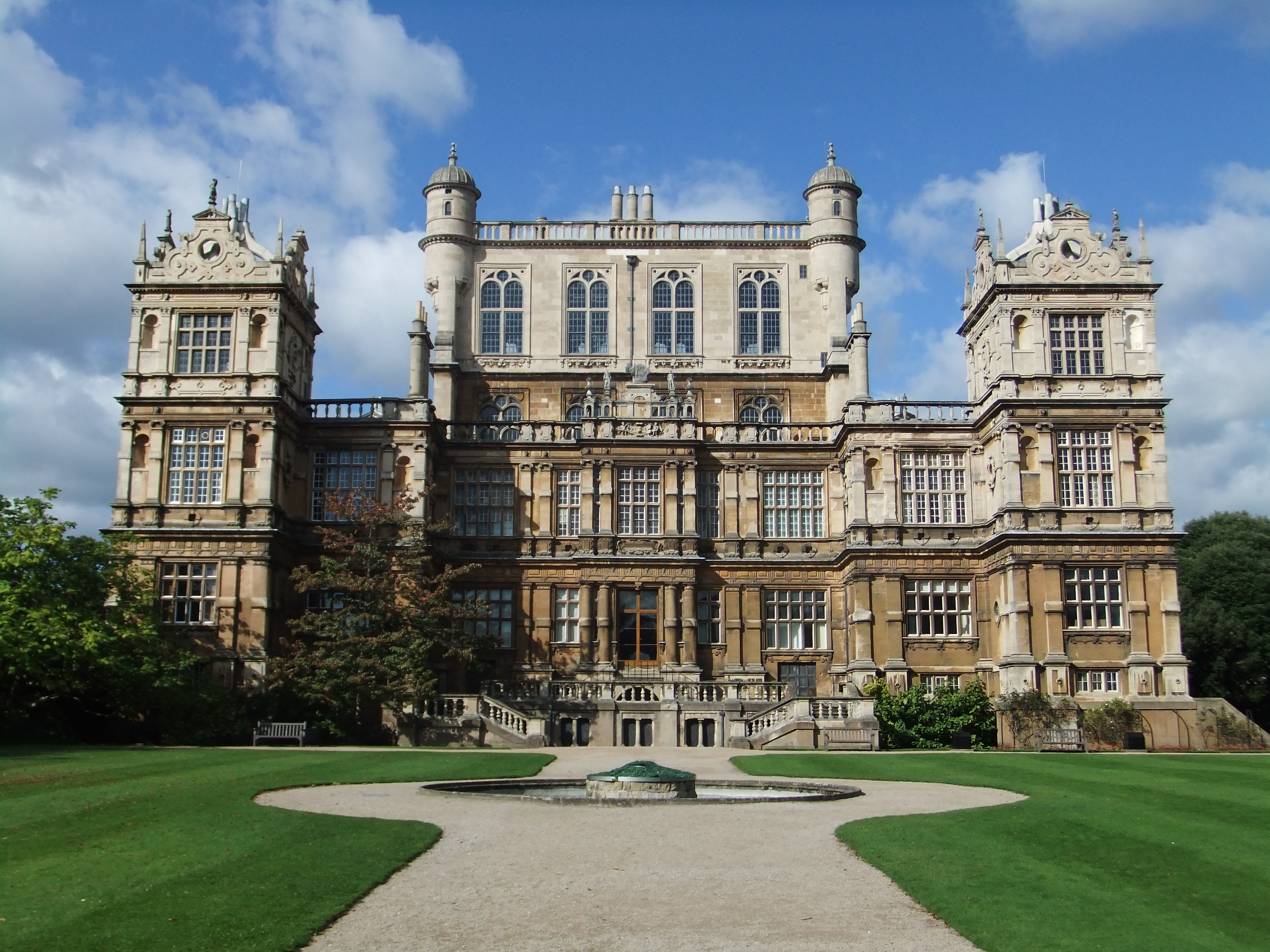
Wollaton Hall in the grounds of Wollaton Park

Nottingham holds several multicultural events throughout the year. The city has hosted an annual Asian Mela every summer since about 1989, there is a parade on St Patrick's Day, fireworks for the Chinese New Year, Holi in the Park to celebrate the Hindu spring festival, a West Indian-style carnival which takes place in summer, and several Sikh events.

The city is particularly famous for its annual Goose Fair, a large travelling funfair held at the Forest Recreation Ground at the beginning of October every year. Established over 700 years ago, the fair was originally a livestock market where thousands of geese were sold in the Old Market Square, but the modern-day Goose Fair is known for its fairground rides and attractions.

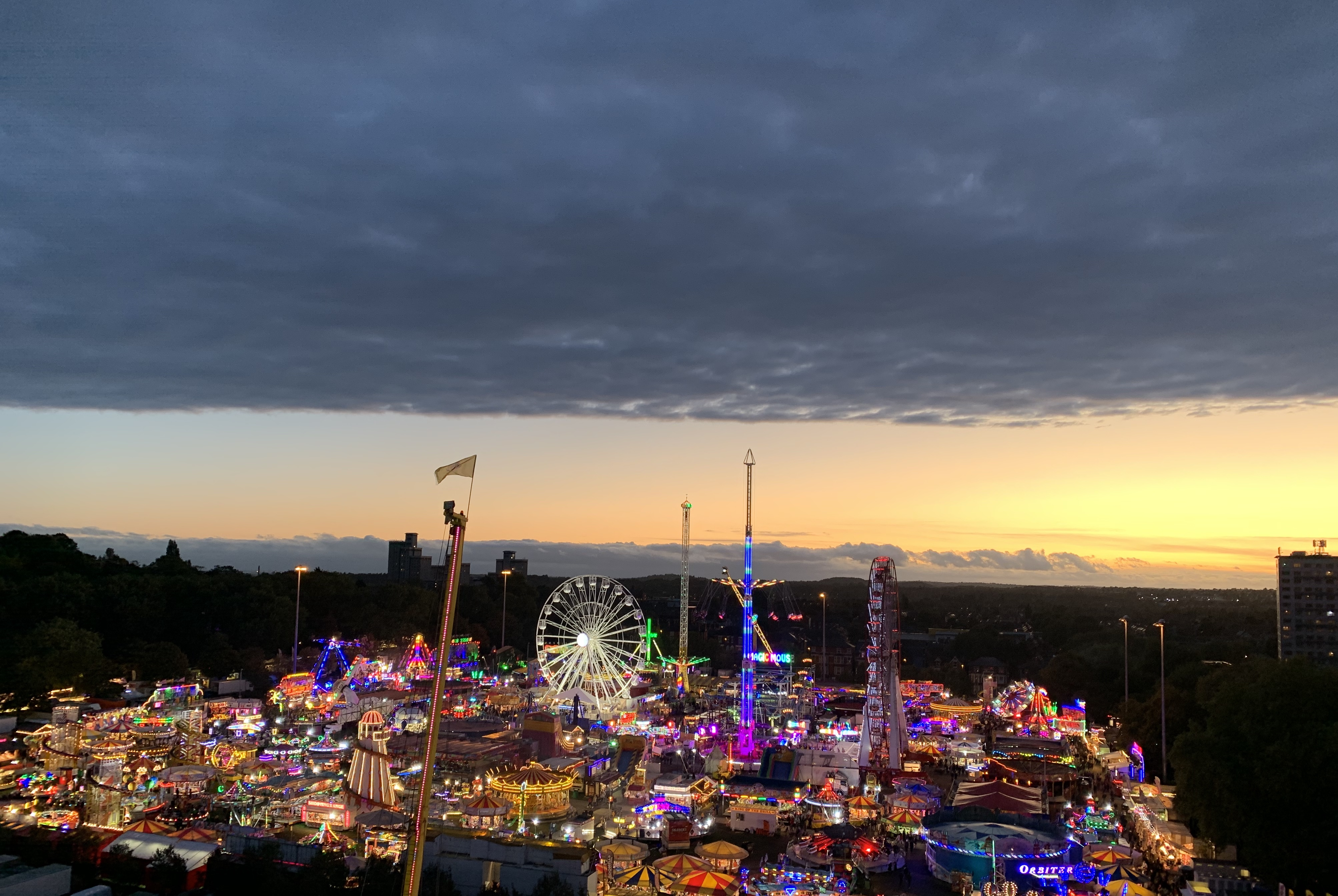
Nottingham Goose Fair

Since the late 1990s, Nottinghamshire Pride has organised an annual pride parade, a day-long celebration that usually takes place in the city in July.

=== Rainbow Quarter ===
Plans are in place for a rainbow quarter in the Hockley area which will consist of Broad Street, Carlton Street and Heathcote Street. This will aim to provide a LGBTQ friendly area to rival the areas of Manchester and Brighton Gay Villages.

Carlton Street, Hockley

=== Food and drink ===
Nottingham has two Michelin starred restaurants; Alchemilla which has been awarded 1 star, and Sat Bains restaurant with rooms, which had been awarded 2 Michelin stars.

Another 5 recommended restaurants are mentioned in the Michelin guide in 2020. For instance Ibérico World Tapas in the city centre was awarded a Bib Gourmand in the 2013 Michelin Guide.

Several of the restaurants in Nottingham are AA Rosette winners (as of 2018).

Nottingham is recognised as one of the UK's most vegan-friendly cities, and it is where Veggies of Nottingham was founded in 1984.

Nottingham City Council in 2024 announced it had switched to all plant-based catering, following similar changes by other councils including Oxfordshire County Council and Cambridge City Council.

=== Tourism ===
In 2010, Nottingham was named as one of the "Top 10 Cities to Visit in 2010" by DK Travel. Nottingham was ranked number one for the 'Best Value City Break' in August 2017 by TripAdvisor. According to the Scarborough Tourism Economic Activity Monitor (STEAM) report, tourism in Nottingham city was valued at £628 million in 2017, an increase of 4.1% over the 2016 figure of £604 million.

Many local businesses and organisations use the worldwide fame of Robin Hood to represent or promote their brands. The Robin Hood Pageant takes place in Nottingham each year and has been rebranded Robin Hood Live for 2020. The city is home to the Nottingham Robin Hood Society, founded in 1972 by Jim Lees and Steve and Ewa Theresa West. Sherwood Forest County Park is a Natural Nature Reserve spanning 450 acres (1.8 km^{2}) in the county of Nottinghamshire only 17 miles (27 km) north of Nottingham. This grand forest has been a part of great history for centuries, showing evidence of use by prehistoric hunters and gatherers. It is even said that the legendary Robin Hood of the 1200s has set foot here and hid near the Major Oak, referred to as the 1,000-year-old giant tree. Today, Sherwood Forest Visitor Centre & Nature Reserve is internationally recognised, with annual visitors reaching around 350,000.

Each February Nottingham celebrates Light Night, with dozens of free creative events illuminating the city. The city has also hosted the Nottingham Cave Festival, Nottingham Puppet Festival, The Nottingham Festival of Science and Curiosity, plus a series of outdoor film and theatre performances at historical locations throughout the summer.

In February 2008, a Ferris wheel was put up in the Old Market Square. The wheel returned to Nottingham in February 2009 to mark another night of lights, activities, illuminations and entertainment. Initially marketed as the Nottingham Eye, it was later redubbed as the Nottingham Wheel, to avoid any association with the London Eye.

== Sport ==
=== Football ===
Nottingham is home to professional football club EFL League One club Notts County, and Premier League club Nottingham Forest is named after the city but is located in nearby town West Bridgford. Their two football grounds, facing each other on opposite sides of the River Trent, are noted for geographically being the closest in English league football. Notts County, formed in 1862, is the oldest professional football club in the world. It was also among the Football League's founder members in 1888. For most of its history the team have played their home games at Meadow Lane, which currently holds some 20,000 spectators, all seated. They currently play in League Two of the English Football League (most recently played at Level 1 in May 1992).

Nottingham Forest, who currently play in the Premier League, were Division One English League champions in 1978 and won the European Cup twice over the next two seasons under the management of Brian Clough, who was the club's manager from January 1975 to May 1993, leading them to four Football League Cup triumphs in that time. They have played at the City Ground, on the south bank of the River Trent, since 1898. Nottingham Forest joined the Football League in 1892, four years after its inception when it merged with the rival Football Alliance, and 100 years later, they were among the FA Premier League's founder members in 1992—though they had not played top division football from May 1999 until their promotion from the Level 2 EFL Championship in the 2021/2022 season, 23 years later. The City Ground played host to group stage games in the 1996 European Football Championships.

Nottingham won the title of 2015 City of Football after five months of campaigning, which resulted in £1.6m in funding for local football ventures and to encourage more people to play the sport. Nottingham was selected to be a host city for the England 2018 FIFA World Cup bid. It was proposed that if the bid were successful, the city would have received a new Nottingham Forest Stadium.

=== Other sports ===
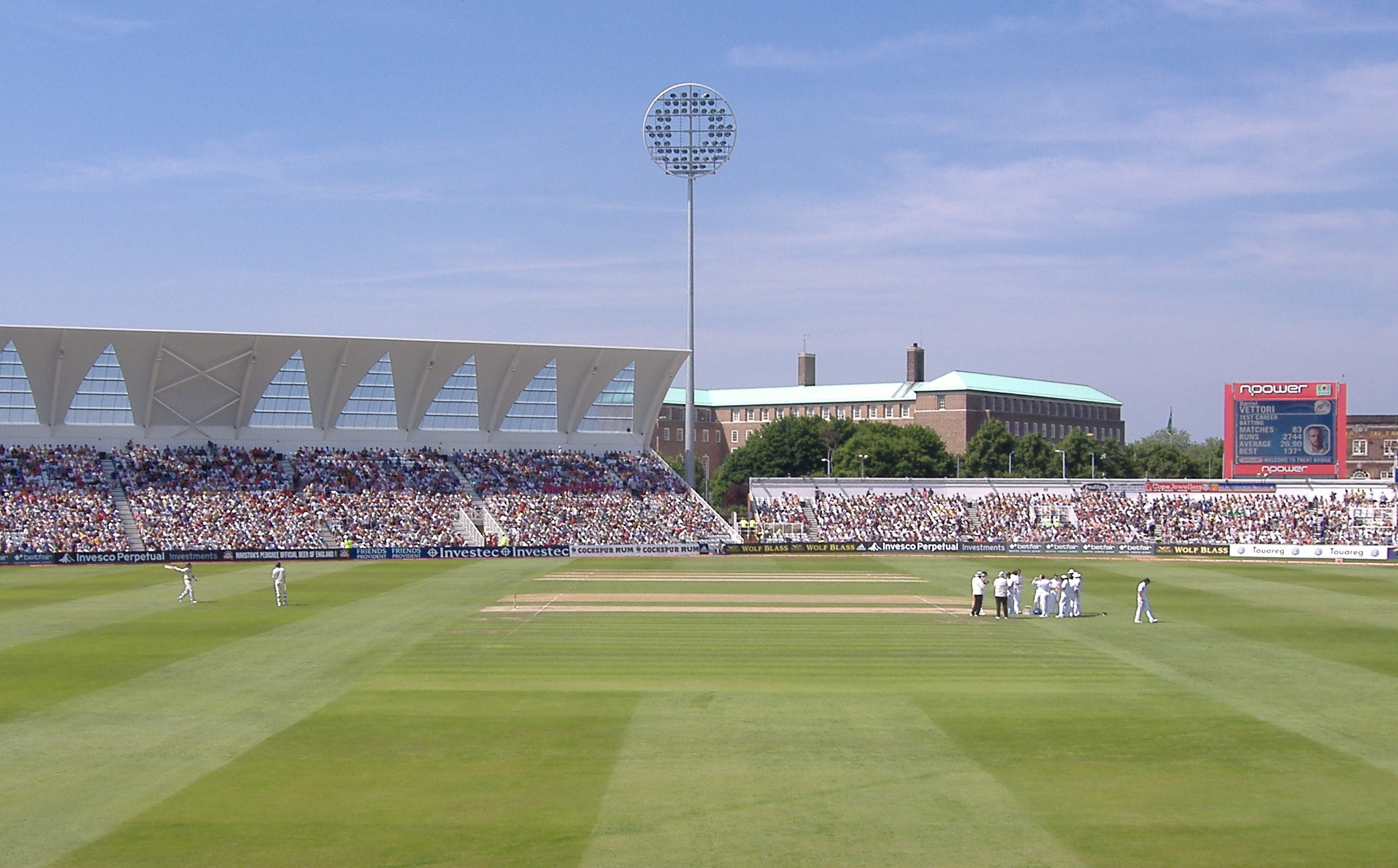
Trent Bridge

Nottinghamshire County Cricket Club is based at Trent Bridge, a test cricket ground that was one of the venues for the 2009 ICC World Twenty20 tournament. Nottinghamshire won the 2010 County Championship.

The rugby union team, Nottingham R.F.C., competes in the RFU Championship, playing their home games at the Nottinghamshire Sports Club in the Lady Bay area of the city. The Nottingham Outlaws are an amateur rugby league team that plays in the Yorkshire Men's League. The Nottingham Caesars are the city's American football club, playing their games at the Harvey Hadden Stadium in the Bilborough area of Nottingham.

The city was the birthplace and training location for Torvill and Dean, who won gold medals in ice dance at the 1984 Sarajevo Olympics. The National Ice Centre, which first opened in 2000, is the home base of the Nottingham Panthers ice hockey team, and hosts an array of winter sporting events including the UK Speed Skating Championships. The plaza at the front of the ice centre is named "Bolero Square" after Torvill and Dean's gold medal-winning performance.

Other sporting events in the city include the annual Nottingham Trophy tennis tournament (staged at the Nottingham Tennis Centre), the "Robin Hood" Marathon and the Outlaw Triathlon.

There are a number of field hockey clubs based in and around Nottingham that are part of the men's and women's national league, the Midlands Hockey League and the BUCS league structures. Current hockey clubs in and around the area are Beeston, Boots, Mansfield, Nottingham, Nottingham Players, Sikh Union (Nottingham), South Nottingham, West Bridgford, Nottingham Trent University and University of Nottingham. Some clubs are based at the Nottingham Hockey Centre.

Nottingham has two roller derby leagues: Nottingham Roller Derby (formerly Nottingham Roller Girls, formed 2010, and home to the Super Smash Brollers from 2013 to 2020) and East Midlands Open Roller Derby (formed 2020, after the Super Smash Brollers team left the Nottingham Roller Derby banner to become a new, standalone league). The Nottingham Hellfire Harlots were a WTFDA-ranked league from 2010 to 2023. They announced their disbanding on 3 August 2023, citing the difficulties with continuing to run a grassroots sports team.

In October 2015, Nottingham was named as the official Home of Sport by VisitEngland, for its sporting contributions and in recognition of its development of football, cricket, field hockey, ice hockey, boxing, tennis, athletics, gymnastics, and water sports.

== Transport ==
=== Air ===
Nottingham is served by East Midlands Airport.

=== Trams ===
Map of the NET tram network

The reintroduction of trams in 2004 made Nottingham one of nine English cities to have a light rail system. As of May 2025, trams ran either from the city centre to Hucknall in the north to Toton Lane in the south, or between Phoenix Park park and ride and Clifton.

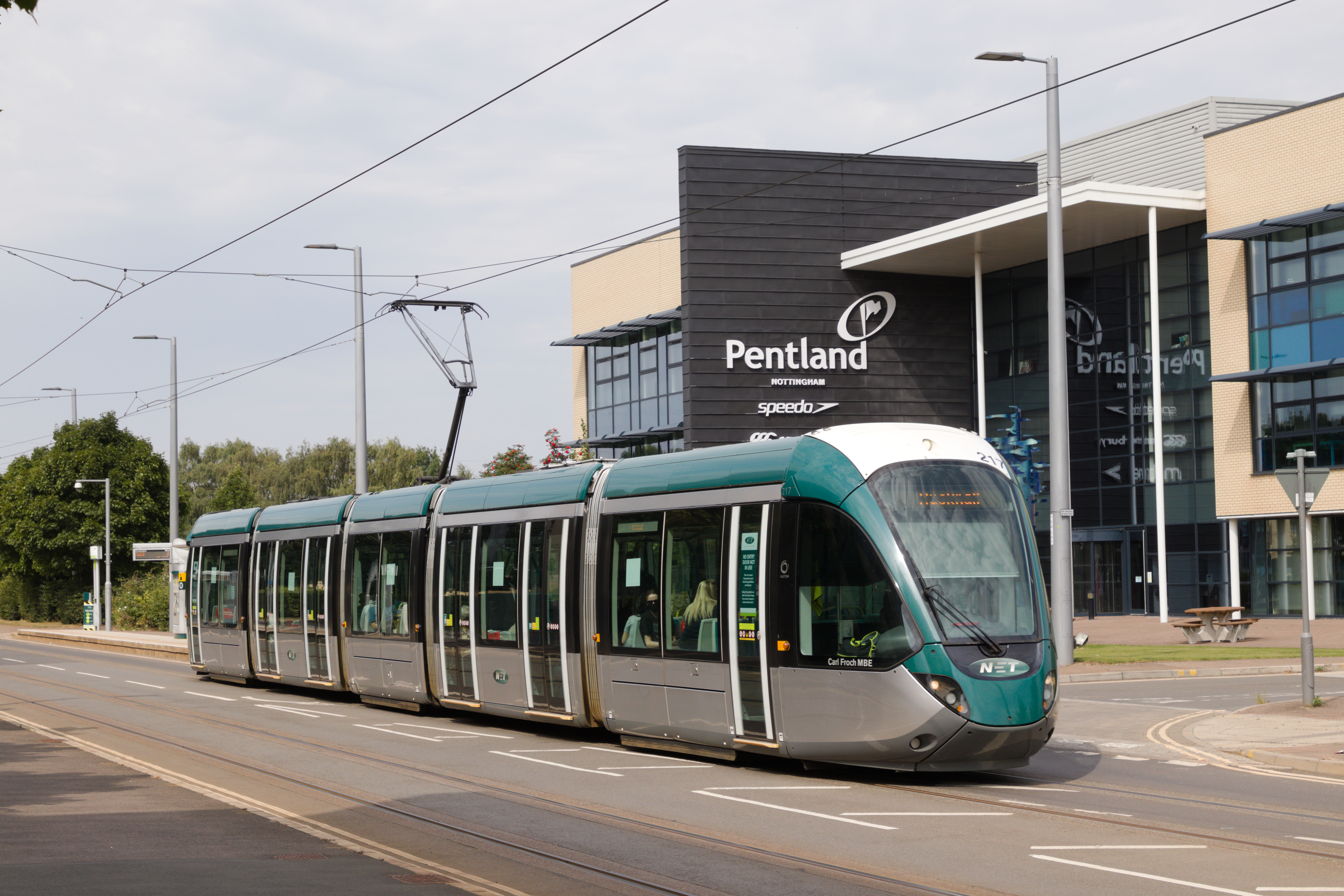
Nottingham Express Transit tram

=== Railways ===
Nottingham railway station, formerly Nottingham Midland, provides access to rail services for the city; trains are operated by CrossCountry, East Midlands Railway and Northern. It is the only remaining station in the city centre and is the second-busiest railway station in the Midlands for passenger entries and exits.

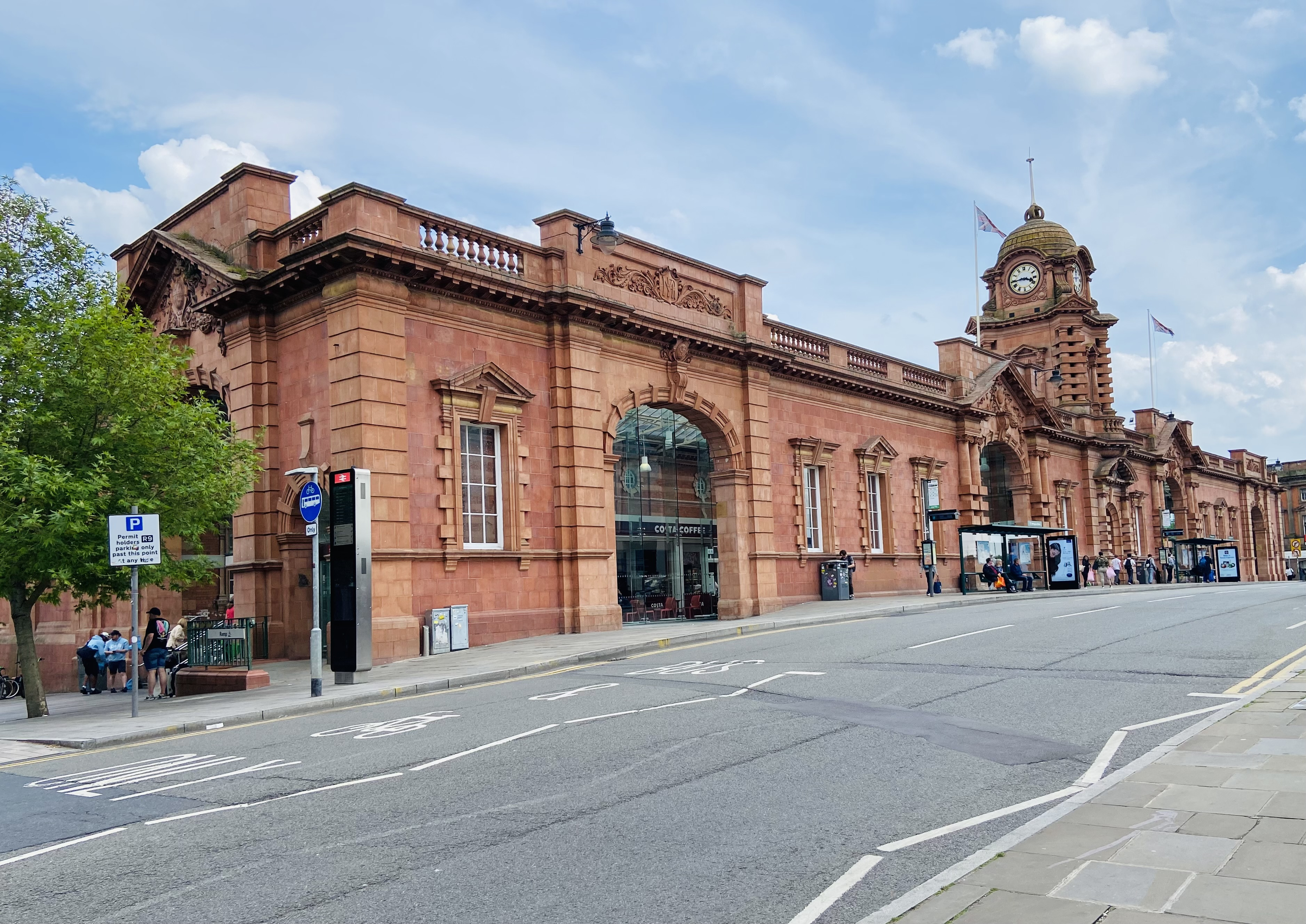
Nottingham station

The city once had five other railway stations.

=== Buses ===
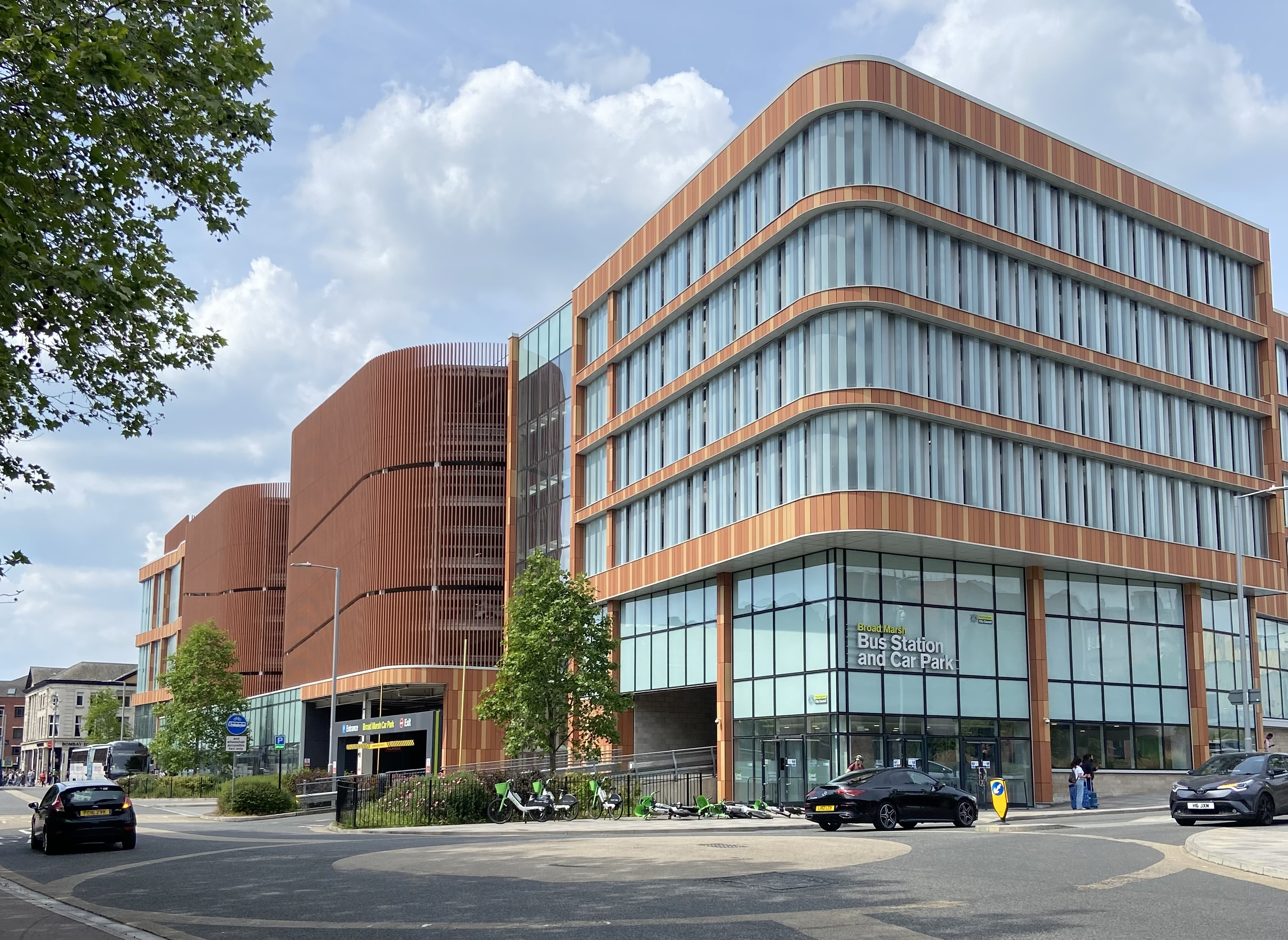
Broadmarsh bus station

Nottingham is served by a municipal bus company, Nottingham City Transport (NCT), which is the biggest transport operator in the city with 330 buses. NCT has won five UK Bus Operator of the Year awards, most recently in 2019. The former Broadmarsh shopping centre and multi-storey car park was demolished in the early 2020s; the car park was rebuilt to include a bus station and library, while the centre was demolished and plans to be landscaped into an urban park.

=== Roads ===
In April 2012, Nottingham became the first city in the UK to introduce a workplace parking levy. The levy charges businesses £350 on each parking space made available to their employees, provided that the business has more than ten such parking spaces. The council have used the revenue of around £10 million a year to develop the city's tram system. There has been a 9% reduction in traffic and 15% increase in public transport use since the introduction of the levy.

In September 2010, Nottingham was named England's least car-dependent city by the Campaign for Better Transport with London, Brighton and Manchester in second, third and fourth place, respectively.

=== Scooter hire ===
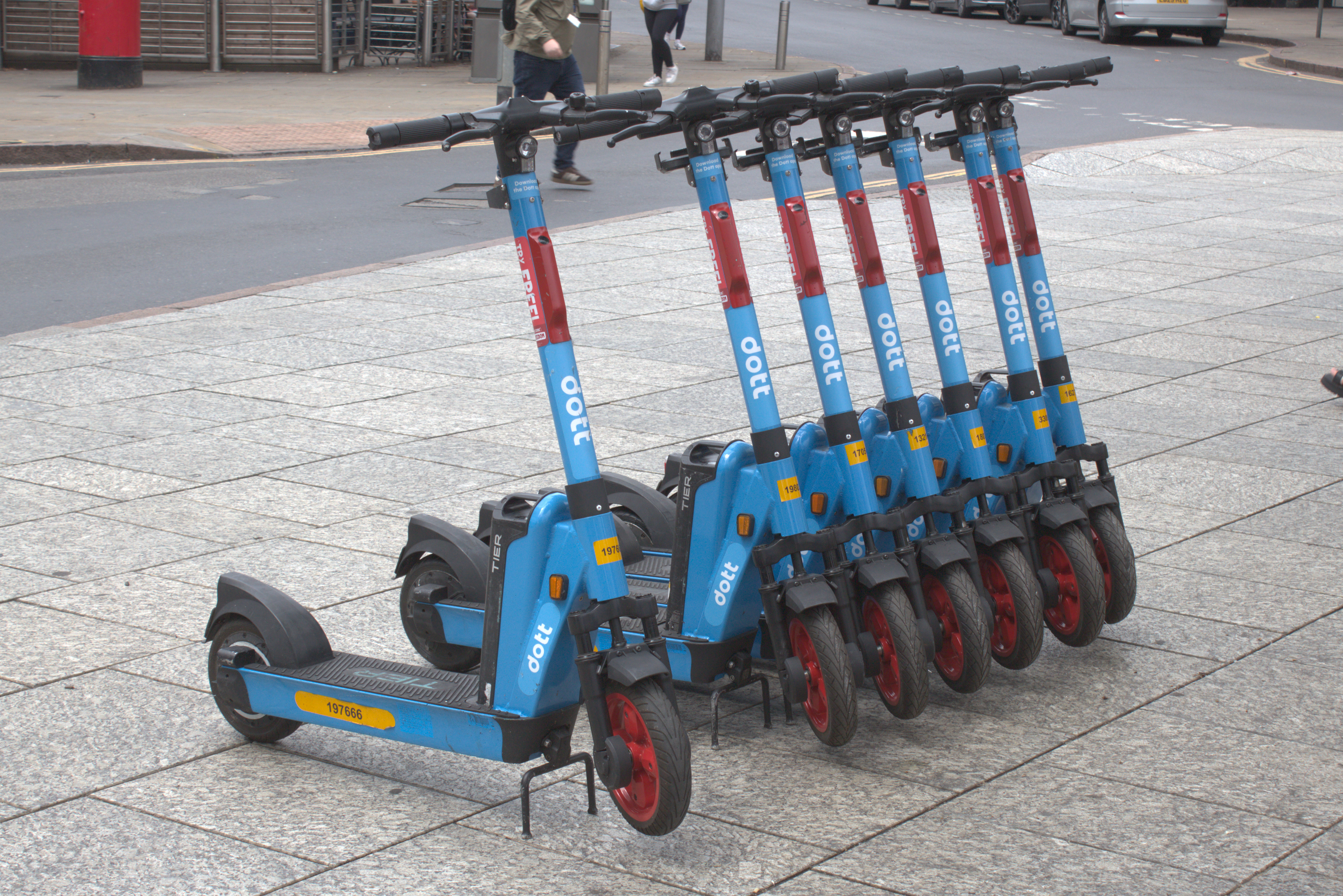
Scooters for hire in Nottingham

Nottingham was one of several trial locations arranged by the Department for Transport to facilitate local journeys by e-scooters. Started in October 2020 together with Derby City Council, in December 2023 the trial was extended until 2026. Riders must be 18 years of age minimum, hold a full provisional driving licence, must ride on roads and bus lanes only, not pedestrian footways, and pay by mobile-phone app.

In late December 2023, the partner-business, US-based Superpedestrian, planned to cease trading by 31 December, and the scooters were withdrawn from their city centre locations.

== Public services ==
=== Emergency ===
Fire and rescue services are provided by Nottinghamshire Fire and Rescue Service, and emergency medical care by East Midlands Ambulance Service, both of which have their headquarters in Nottingham. There are two major National Health Service hospitals in Nottingham, the Queen's Medical Centre (QMC) and Nottingham City Hospital, both managed by the Nottingham University Hospitals NHS Trust. The QMC is a teaching hospital with close connections to the Medical School at Nottingham University; until 2012, it was the largest hospital in the UK. Nottingham City Hospital includes maternity and neonatal facilities but has no A&E department. Students from the Medical School are attached to most of the departments at City Hospital as part of their clinical training.

Law enforcement is carried out by Nottinghamshire Police, whose headquarters are at Sherwood Lodge in Arnold. The city has a Crown Court and a Magistrates' Court. Laurie Macdonald of Inside One magazine observes that Nottingham's former high crime rate earned it the nickname "Shottingham", but that by 2013 this image was outdated. The article was written in response to a uSwitch survey that had found south Nottinghamshire to be the fourth-best place to live in the UK in terms of living standards. Crime in the city of Nottingham had also fallen by three-quarters since 2007.

=== Utilities ===
Severn Trent Water is the company responsible for supplying fresh water to households and businesses in Nottingham, as well as the treatment of sewage. Severn Trent took over these services from the City of Nottingham Water Department in 1974.

Nottingham was host to the UK's first and only local authority–owned and not-for-profit energy company, Robin Hood Energy. Veolia operates a cogeneration (CHP) plant in Nottingham for generating energy from biomass.

The city has one of the largest district heating schemes in the UK, operated by EnviroEnergy Limited, which is wholly owned by Nottingham City Council. The plant in the city centre supplies heat to 4,600 homes and a wide variety of business premises, including the Concert Hall, the Nottingham Arena, the Victoria Baths, the Broadmarsh Shopping Centre, the Victoria Centre, and others.

== Religion ==
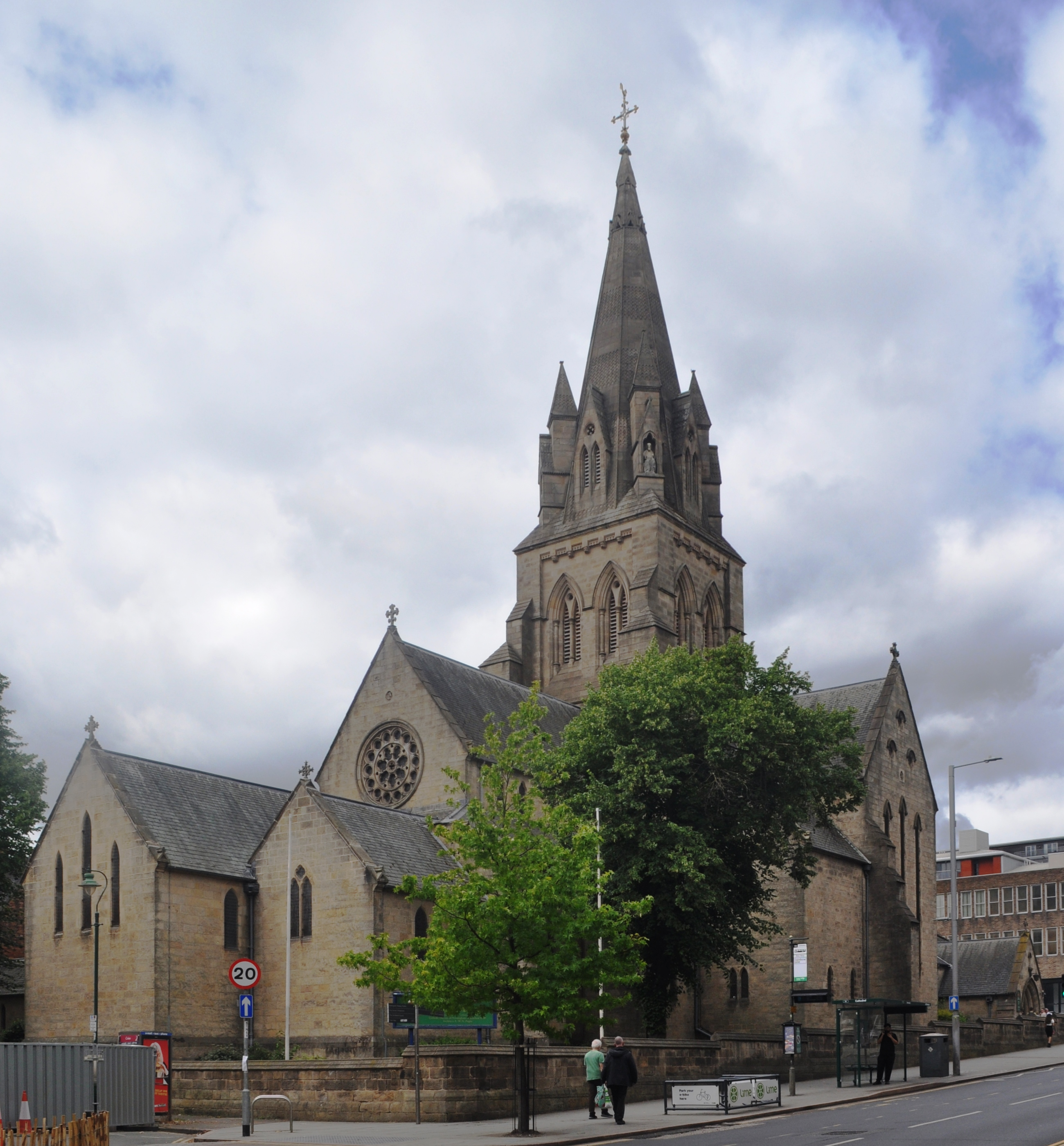
Nottingham Cathedral

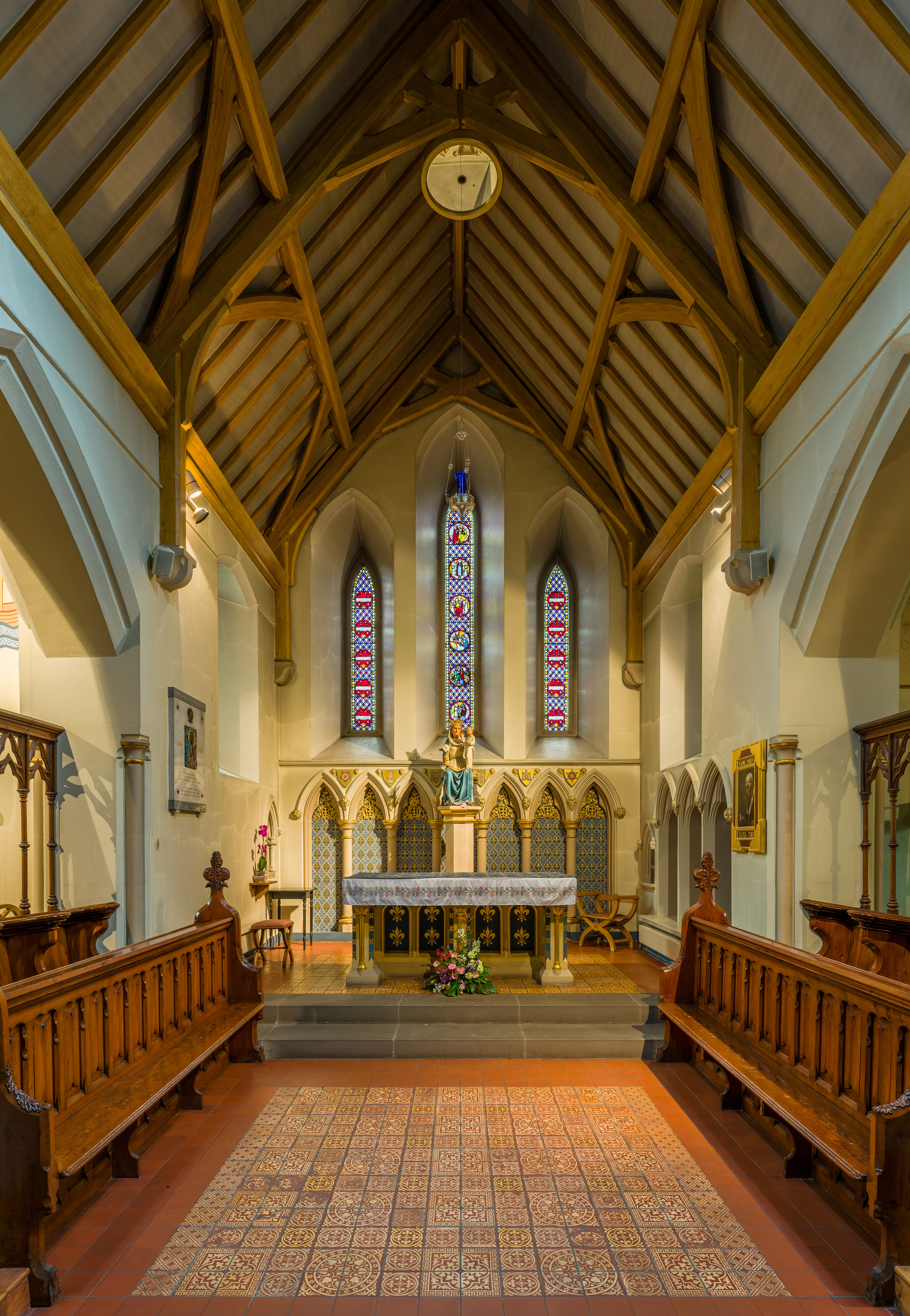
Nottingham Cathedral

Historically, the requirement for city status was the presence of an Anglican (Church of England) cathedral; however, Nottingham does not have one of these, having only been designated a city in 1897 in celebration of Queen Victoria's Diamond Jubilee. From around AD 1100, Nottingham was part of the Diocese of Lichfield, controlled as an archdeaconry from Lichfield Cathedral in Staffordshire. In 1837, Nottingham's archdeaconry was placed under the control of the Diocese of Lincoln and, in 1884, it was incorporated into the newly created Diocese of Southwell which it is still part of today. The bishop is based at Southwell Minster, 14 miles (23 km) northeast of the city.

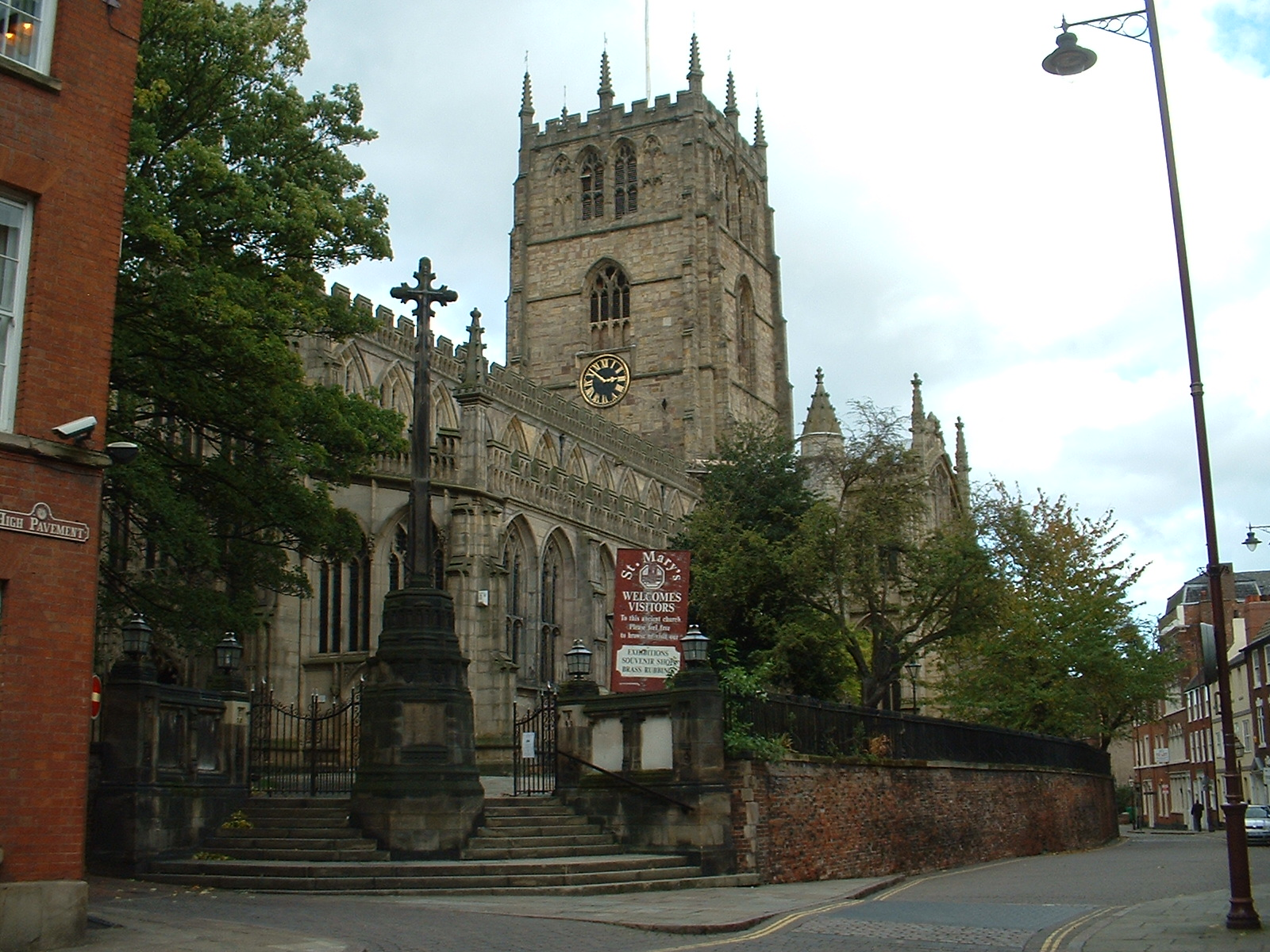
St Mary's Church, Nottingham

Although lacking an Anglican cathedral, Nottingham has three notable historic Anglican parish churches, all of which date from the Middle Ages. The oldest and largest of these is St. Mary the Virgin, situated in the Lace Market. The church dates from the eighth or ninth centuries, but the present structure is at least the third building on the site, dating primarily from 1377 to 1485. A member of the Major Churches Network, St. Mary's is considered the mother church of the city and is used for holding civic services, including the annual welcome to the new Lord Mayor. In the heart of the city is St. Peter's, the oldest building in continuous use in Nottingham, with traces of building dating from 1180. The third notable Anglican parish church is St. Nicholas', on the edge of the city centre.

There are various chapels and meeting rooms in Nottingham. Many of the grand buildings have been demolished, including Halifax Place Wesleyan Chapel, but some have been re-used, notably High Pavement Chapel which is now a public house. The city has three Christadelphian meeting halls and is home to the national headquarters of the Congregational Federation.

Nottingham is one of 18 British cities that do not have an Anglican cathedral. It is, however, home to the Roman Catholic Cathedral of St. Barnabas, which was designed by Augustus Pugin and consecrated in 1844. It is the cathedral church for the Roman Catholic Diocese of Nottingham.

Today, there are places of worship for all major religions, including Christianity and Islam (with 32 mosques in Nottingham).

== Demographics ==
Ethnic demography of Nottingham over time

Contemporary and projected population growth in Nottingham
Year	1981	1991	2001	2011	2016	2021	2031
Population	263,581	263,526	266,987	305,680	325,282	323,632	354,000
Source	Census				ONS	ONS	ONS Projections

The population of Nottingham is 325,765 (2025). The population of Greater Nottingham is 729,977 (2011) and the Metro population is 1,543,000 (2011). The city of Nottingham has a density of 4,338/km^{2} (11,240/sq mi). At the 2021 census, 65.9% were White, 14.9% Asian, 10.0% Black, 5.9% mixed or multiple ethnic groups and other groups were 3.3%.

== Media ==
=== Television ===
The BBC has its East Midlands headquarters in Nottingham on London Road. BBC East Midlands Today is broadcast from the city every weeknight at 6:30 pm.

From 1983 to 2005 Central Television (the ITV region for the east Midlands) had a studio complex on Lenton Lane, producing programmes for various networks and broadcasting regional news. The studios are now a satellite campus of the University of Nottingham, since 2005.

The city was granted permission by Ofcom to establish its own local television station. After a tender process, Confetti College was awarded the licence. The station was declared open by Prince Harry in April 2013 and Notts TV broadcast from spring 2014 to 2025.

=== Radio ===
In addition to the national commercial and BBC radio stations, the Nottingham area is served by licensed commercial radio stations (though all broadcast to a wider area than the city).

Radio stations include BBC Radio Nottingham, Gold East Midlands, Greatest Hits Radio Midlands, Hits Radio East Midlands, Capital Midlands, Smooth East Midlands and Kemet FM.

The city's two universities both broadcast their own student radio station. Fly FM is based at Nottingham Trent University's city campus and is broadcast online. The station originated in 1996 with its original name of Kick FM. University Radio Nottingham (URN) is broadcast around Nottingham University's main and Sutton Bonington campuses on medium wave (AM), as well as over the internet. URN was founded in 1979 after starting out with a slot on BBC Radio Nottingham in the late 1970s.

=== Newspapers and magazines ===
Nottingham's main local newspaper, the Nottingham Post, is owned by Local World and is published daily from Monday to Saturday each week.

LeftLion magazine is distributed free of charge across the city.

=== Film ===
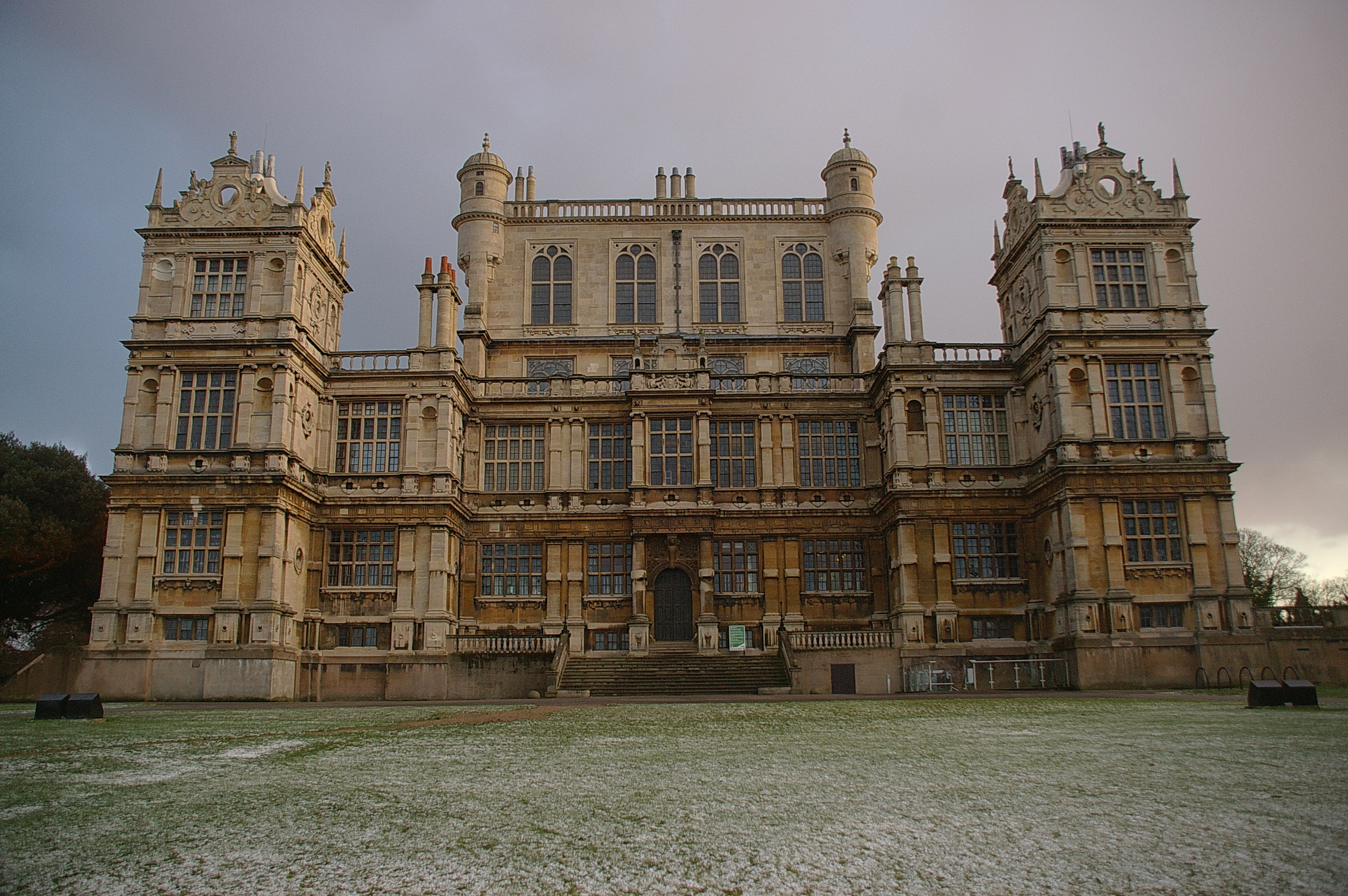
Wollaton Hall was used as Wayne Manor in the Batman film The Dark Knight Rises.

Nottingham has been used as a location in many locally, nationally, and internationally produced films. Movies that have been filmed (partly or entirely) in Nottingham include:

- Saturday Night and Sunday Morning (1960)
- The Loneliness of the Long Distance Runner (1962)
- This Is England (2006)
- Magicians (2007)
- Control (2007)
- Mum & Dad (2008)
- Bronson (2009)
- The Unloved (2009)
- Goal III (2009)
- Bunny and the Bull (2009)
- A Boy Called Dad (2009)
- Oranges and Sunshine (2010)
- Weekend (2011)
- The Dark Knight Rises (2012)

== International relations ==
Nottingham is twinned with the following cities:

- Ljubljana, Slovenia (1963)
- Minsk, Belarus (1966–2022)
- Karlsruhe, Germany (1969)
- Harare, Zimbabwe (1981)
- Ghent, Belgium (1985)
- Ningbo, China (2005)
- Timișoara, Romania (2008)
- Krasnodar, Russia (2012–2022)
- Września, Poland

Note: Ljubljana, Minsk, and Harare are capital cities. Nottingham ended its relations with Minsk and Krasnodar in March 2022.

== Notable people ==
Some of the more notable people from the city of Nottingham include:

- Samantha Morton (born 1972) - Actress and musician. She has reviewed two BAFTAs and a Golden Globe Award.
- Vicky McClure (born 1983) - Actress, model and presenter. Best known for her role in Trigger Point and the Line of Duty who has a BAFTA
- Lennie James - Actor in The Walking Dead (TV series) who won the British Academy Television Award for Best Actor in 2025.
- William Roache (born 1932) - Actor who plays Ken Barlow in Coronation Street.
- Bella Ramsey - Actor who starred in the series of Game of Thrones, and is currently the lead actor in the critically acclaimed HBO series, the Last of Us. They have won a BAFTA for their work on The Worst Witch and is the first non-binary actor to be nominated for a Primetime Emmy Award for Outstanding Lead Actress in a Drama Series.
- D. H. Lawrence Poet and Novelist who was educated at Nottingham High School.
- Jesse Boot, 1st Baron Trent who transformed the Boots (company) into a national retailer. His father was John Boot the sole founder.
- Sir Paul Smith - Fashion Designer.
- Dame Jayne Torvill and Sir Christopher Dean- Ice Dancing pair, 1984 Sarajevo Winter Olympic gold medalists for Ice dancing, television judges and stars of Dancing on Ice, and competitors.
- Herbert Kilpin Football Player and Manager. He was the founder of the football club AC Milan.
- William Booth Methodist Preacher who founded The Salvation Army.
- Sir Peter Mansfield Physicist who discovered the MRI.
- John Peake Knight - Railway Manager credited with inventing the Traffic light in 1868.
- Stewart Adams and John Nicholson, developed Ibuprofen while working at Boots Pure Drug Company.

== See also ==
- List of public art in Nottingham
- Listed buildings in Nottingham
- 1185 East Midlands earthquake
- Snotingas
- 2023 Nottingham attacks
