= Nottingham Parksmart =

Parking scheme

Coordinates: 52.952°N 1.149°W

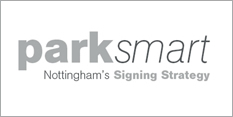
The Parksmart logo

Nottingham Parksmart is a parking scheme which divides Nottingham city centre into five distinctive zones to aid parking in the city, and to help tourists find attractions.

== Plans ==
The plan first appeared in early 2004, and integration began in 2008.

In August 2009, pedestrian signs were set up in the city centre for tourists. The signs have the logo of their respective zone, a map of the whole city, and the attractions near to the sign. Road signs indicating the zones have been erected, Electronic signs have also gone up in the city, and were integrated with the city's car parks in October 2009.

== Zones ==
Broadmarsh
The Broadmarsh zone is in the south of the city, and contains the site of the former intu Broadmarsh shopping centre, the Magistrates' and Crown Courts, and Nottingham station.

Castle
Nottingham Castle is the namesake of this zone. Castle is the largest zone, and covers the western side of the city centre. Standard Hill, where King Charles I declared the English Civil War is also in this zone, as is the site of the old General Hospital. The Albert Hall can be found in the north of the zone, next to Nottingham Playhouse.

Lace Market
The Lace Market zone was once the centre of Nottingham’s lace industry. It now contains stylish apartments and restaurants, and contains the area of Hockley. The National Ice Centre (which incorporates the Motorpoint Arena Nottingham) are located in the east of the Lace Market zone.

Royal
The Royal Zone is just north of the Old Market Square, and derives its name from the Theatre Royal and the Royal Concert Hall, both of which are in the zone. The zone also includes The Cornerhouse, Trinity Square and Nottingham Trent University’s city campus.

Victoria
The Victoria Zone's central feature is the intu Victoria Centre, formerly Nottingham Victoria railway station. Victoria bus station is situated within the Victoria Centre.
