= Nottingham city centre =

Central area of Nottingham, England

Coordinates: 52°57′12″N 01°08′55″W

- Central business district
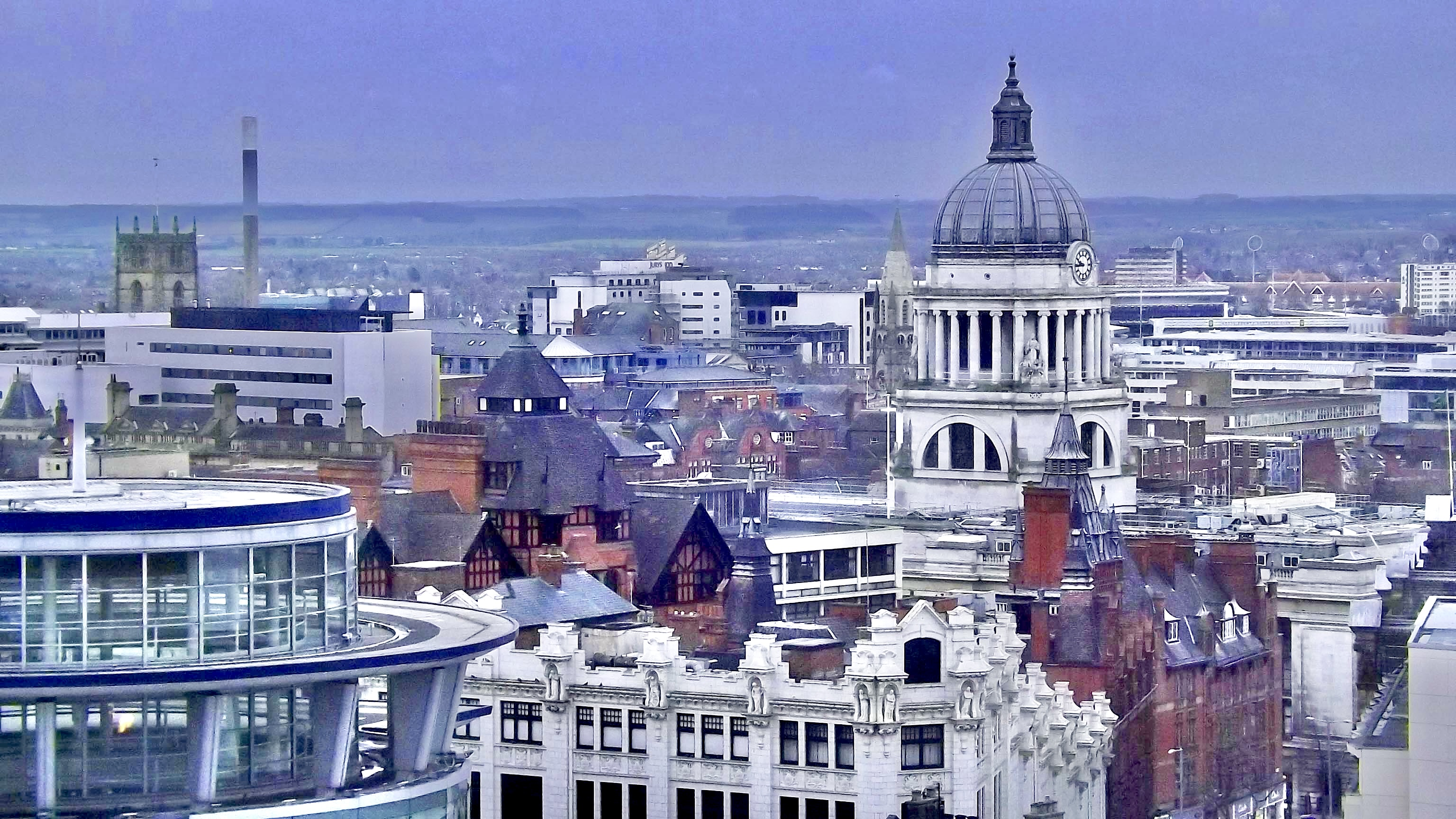
- City skyline and the Council House dome

- Location within Nottinghamshire
- SSE
- Metropolitan borough: City of Nottingham
- Metropolitan county: Nottinghamshire
- Region: East Midlands
- Country: England
- Sovereign state: United Kingdom
- Post town: Nottingham
- Postcode district: NG
- Dialling code: 0115
- Police: Nottinghamshire
- Fire: Nottinghamshire
- Ambulance: East Midlands

Nottingham city centre is the cultural, commercial, financial and historical heart of Nottingham, England, and represents the central area of the Nottingham Urban Area.

== Geography ==
The centre of the city is usually defined as the Old Market Square, one of the largest surviving town squares in the United Kingdom. Covering about 12,000 square metres (3.0 acres), it is within the boundaries of the centuries-old Great Market Place, which covered about 22,000 square metres (5.4 acres) . A major redevelopment of the Old Market Square was completed in March 2007. Many of the main shopping streets surround the square, which is dominated by Nottingham's city hall. Much of the ground floor of the building houses the Exchange Arcade, a boutique shopping centre.

A Bohemian quarter of the city known as Hockley has gained popularity in recent years, situated close to the Lace Market area.

The north-western end of the city centre is home to the Nottingham Trent University city campus, which contains a mix of old and new buildings. The university's Newton building is one of the tallest buildings in Nottingham and has a prominent position on the city's skyline.

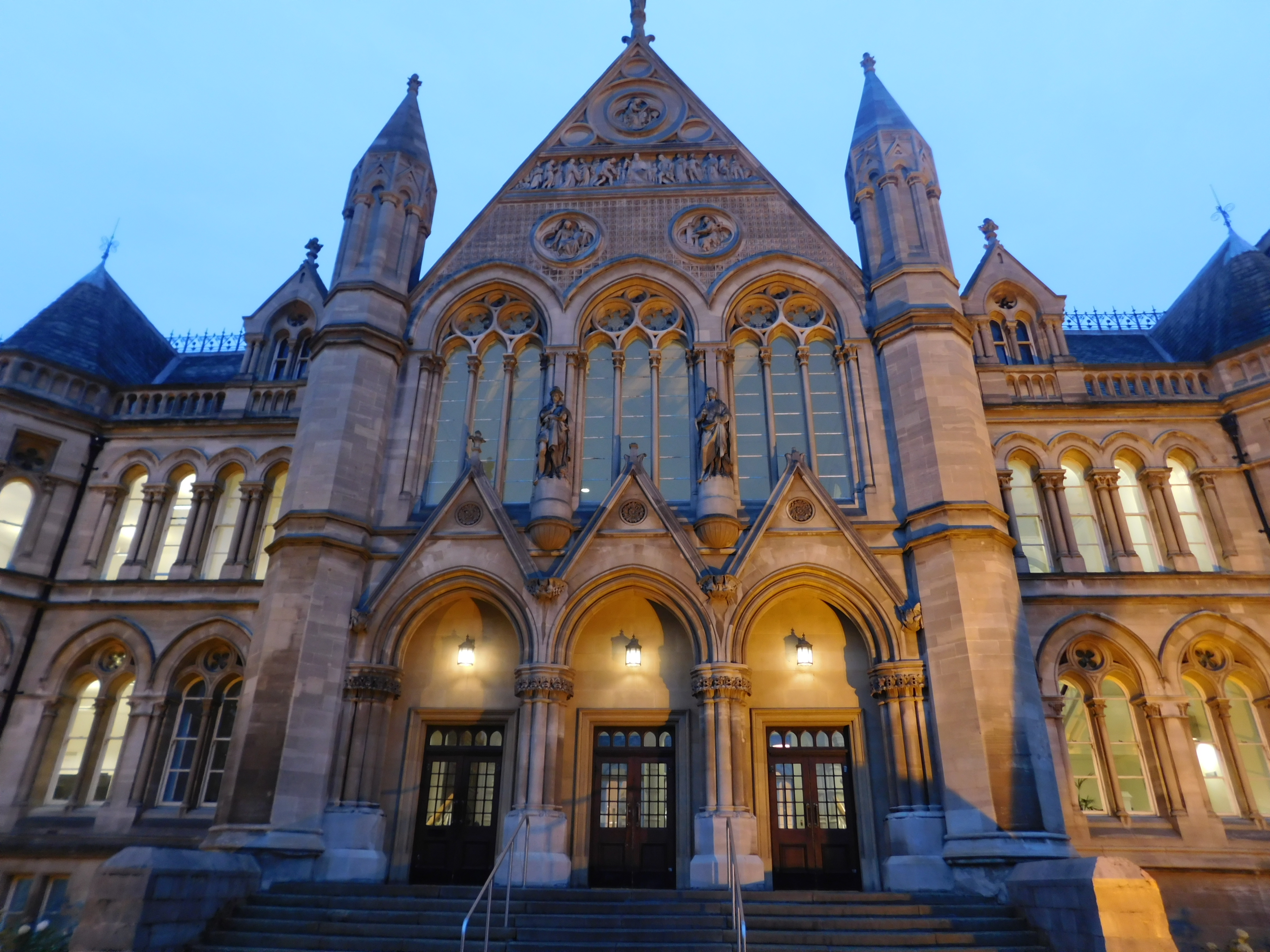
Nottingham Trent University

Nottingham's central railway station is located in the city centre. Nottingham Express Transit trams also service the area.

Interactive map of Nottingham city centre

== Economy ==
=== Shopping ===
Nottingham city centre has been ranked fifth on Experian's list of the top 15 UK retail areas.

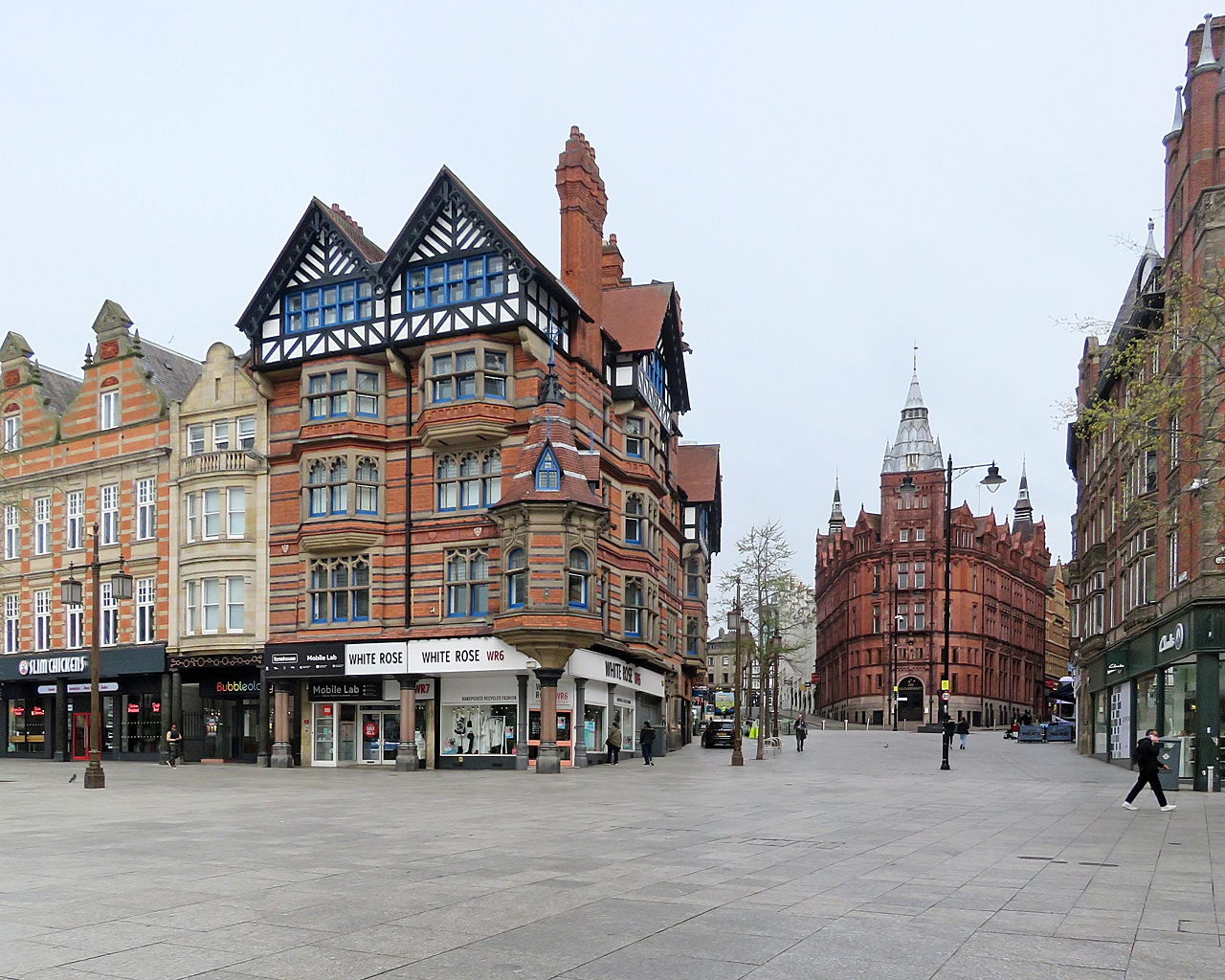
Looking towards King Street

=== Visitor attractions ===
Nottingham Castle is a popular attraction for visitors to the city due to its links with Robin Hood. The Brewhouse Yard Museum (Museum of Nottingham Life) and the Museum of Costume and Textiles are close by.

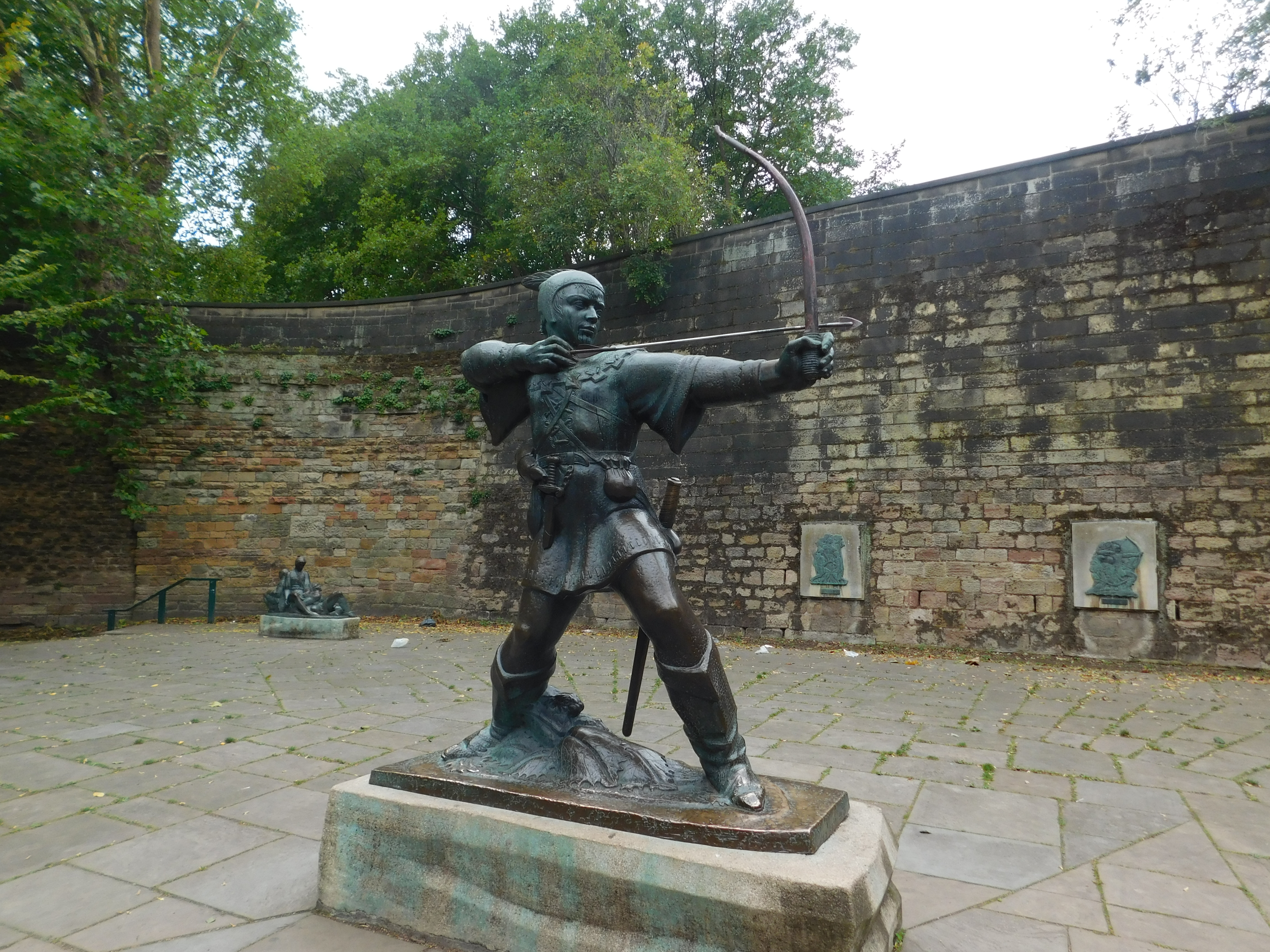
The Robin Hood statue outside Nottingham Castle

Part of Nottingham's expansive cave network is open to the public through the City of Caves attraction, and the Galleries of Justice on High Pavement was once a fully functioning Victorian courtroom.

Notable churches within the city centre include the Roman Catholic Nottingham Cathedral and the medieval St. Mary's Church at the heart of the Lace Market.

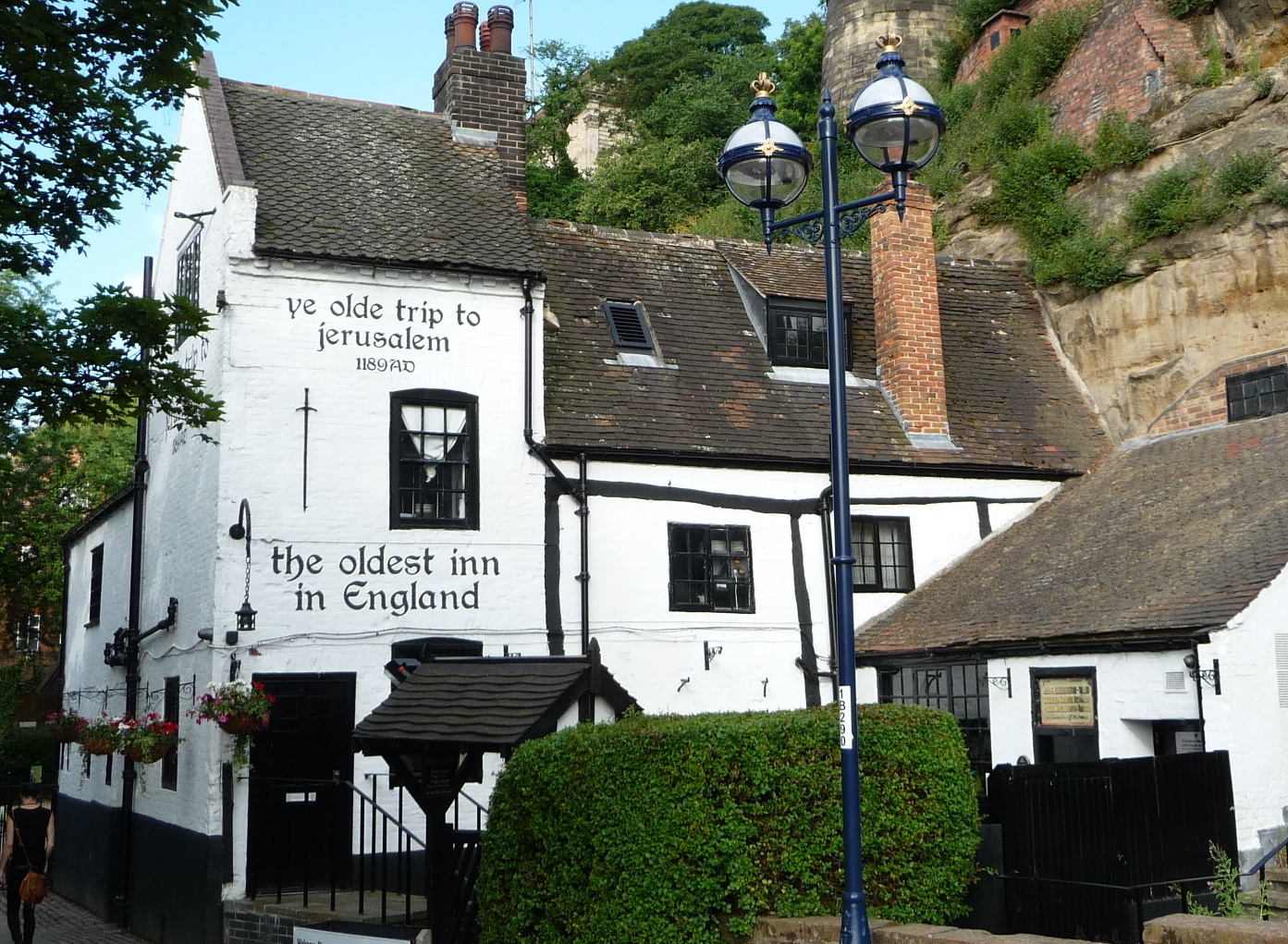
Ye Olde Trip To Jerusalem, reputedly the oldest pub in England

The National Ice Centre (adjoined to Motorpoint Arena Nottingham) is located close to the city's Lace Market quarter and is the first twin Olympic ice-pad facility in the UK. It is the home of the Nottingham Panthers, a professional ice-hockey team.

Rock City is a mid-sized music venue that draws many popular bands from across the world, and so is an important part of Nottingham's music tourism scene.

Every summer the Market Square hosts the annual Nottingham Beach, funded by Mellor Events. It includes an artificial beach, beach bar and rides.

=== Entertainment ===
Nottingham is home to a wide variety of entertainment venues, the largest of which is the 10,000-seater Motorpoint Arena Nottingham (part of the National Ice Centre), where many big-name acts perform regularly.

The city's major producing theatre, the Nottingham Playhouse, has built up a national reputation for its exciting, innovative and contemporary new works.

The Nottingham Royal Centre incorporates the 2,500-seater Royal Concert Hall and the Victorian Theatre Royal. The Royal Concert Hall is the region's top venue for classical music and regularly plays host to world-class orchestras and ballets, while the Theatre Royal is considered one of the finest venues in the country for major touring West End musicals and plays.

Nottingham has a significant stand-up comedy scene, with a large open mic circuit. Nottingham's branch of The Glee Club is situated along the Nottingham Canal.

The Cornerhouse entertainment complex houses a multi-screen Cineworld cinema, a multitude of continental pavement cafés and restaurants, a casino, a flight simulator and an indoor crazy 18-hole golf course.

=== Eastside City ===
There is a redevelopment project in progress that is changing the former industrial brownfield area to the east of Nottingham city centre's historic core, which will be known as Eastside City. This area stretches from the Nottingham Canal in the south towards the National Ice Centre. There are plans to create a site named 'The Island', which will form the heart of the regeneration zone with public open spaces, restaurants and bars and a park for the city's inhabitants. The planned development consists of homes, offices and retail units.

=== Quarters/Zones ===
Nottingham city centre is split into five "zones", which were introduced with the Nottingham Parksmart scheme in 2009 to signpost visitors to parking facilities and tourist attractions. The quarters are named:

- Lace Market
- Broad Marsh
- Castle
- Royal
- Victoria

== Notable buildings or Landscapes ==
- Arkwright & Newton buildings, Nottingham Trent University
- Nottingham Council House
- Nottingham Playhouse
- Nottingham Castle
- Nottingham Cathedral
- St. Mary's Church
- Nottingham railway station
- Broad Marsh
- Victoria Shopping Centre
- The Corner House
- National Ice Centre
- Theatre Royal
- National Justice Museum
- Nottingham Contemporary
- Arboretum
- Ye Olde Trip to Jerusalem
- Royal Concert Hall
