= Trupp =

Trupp is a surname. Notable people with the surname include:

- Alexei Trupp (1858–1918), Footman in the household of Tsar Nicholas II of Russia
- Evan Trupp (born 1987), American professional ice hockey player
- Nathan Trupp (born 1947), American serial killer
- Richard Trupp (born 1973), British sculptor

== See also ==
- Truppführer, Nazi Party paramilitary rank
  - Truppführer (modern), German term for the position of a unit/troop leader
- Troop, military sub-subunit
