= Juggernaut of Nought =

Coordinates: 52.9676°N 1.1523°W

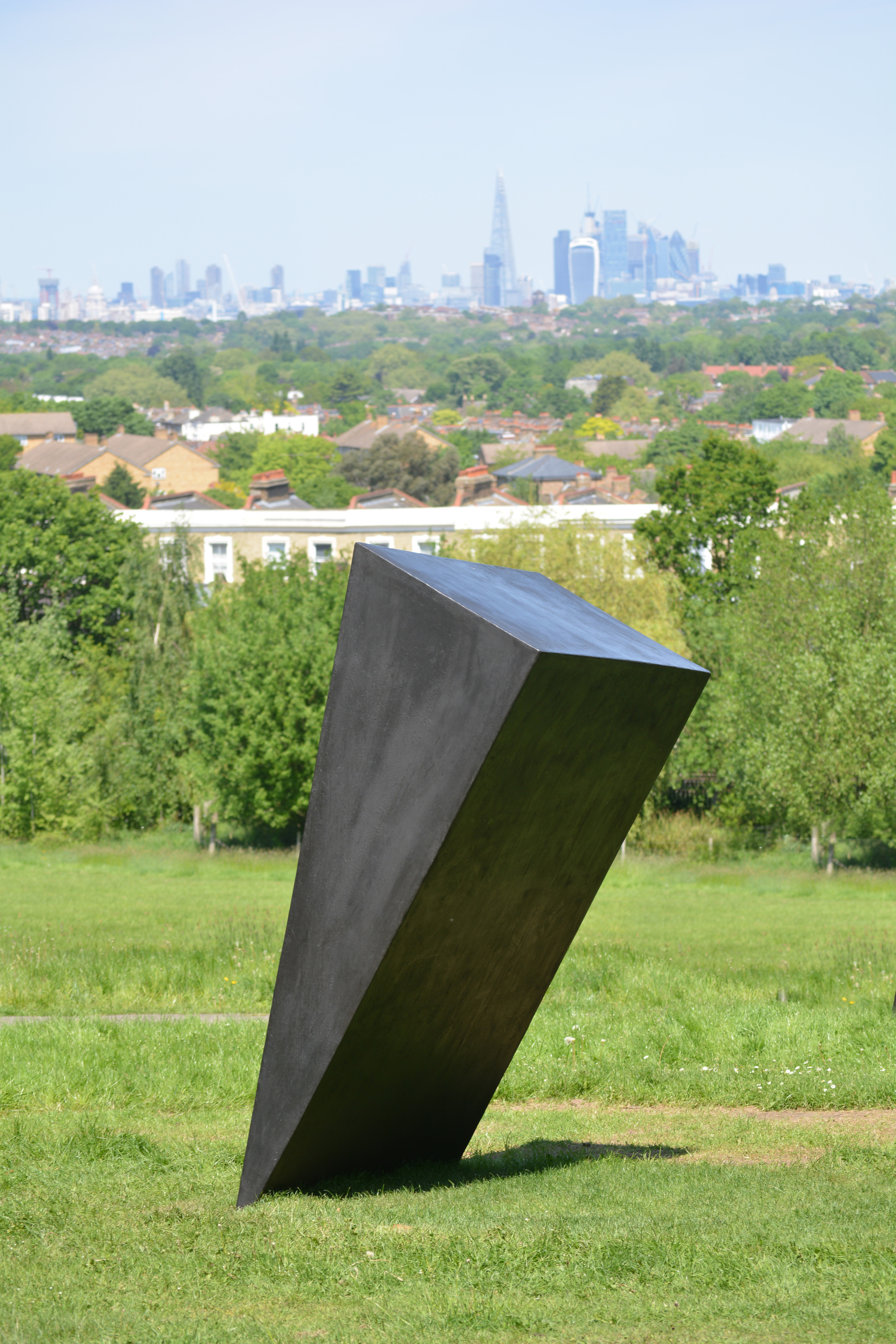
The Juggernaut of Nought, a steel sculpture by Richard Trupp seen here in Norwood Park, south London

The Juggernaut of Nought is a signature sculpture made in steel by sculptor Richard Trupp. The sculpture was originally exhibited in 2011 in the grounds of Great Fosters Hotel in Surrey, England. Of this installation Trupp said "I intended the site-specific sculpture to look like a sculptural exclamation mark in the rural environment. It asks questions of its own existence. Where did it come from? What is it doing here? Is it safe?"

The work was displayed in the University of Leicester's eleventh "Annual Sculpture in the Garden" exhibition in the Harold Martin Botanic Garden. It was exhibited at Burghley House's Sculpture Garden in 2015, and as of 2016 it is installed outside Nottingham Trent University's Arkwright Building in Shakespeare Street. The piece was installed in 2012 for the exhibition Since 1843: In the Making, celebrating 170 years of the university's School of Art and Design of the university. Trupp said "It creates an interruption of the surrounding environment and creates a moment of pause, a moment to ponder."

It was designed as a tribute to Trupp's mentor Anthony Caro, based on a small steel wedge Trupp found in the workshop of Caro and pocketed. Trupp says of the title that: "The word juggernaut implies a fast-moving piece of steel and the nought signifies a beginning". The Nottingham Post described it as a "wedge of black cheese".
