= Royal Centre tram stop =

Nottingham Express Transit tram stop

Royal Centre
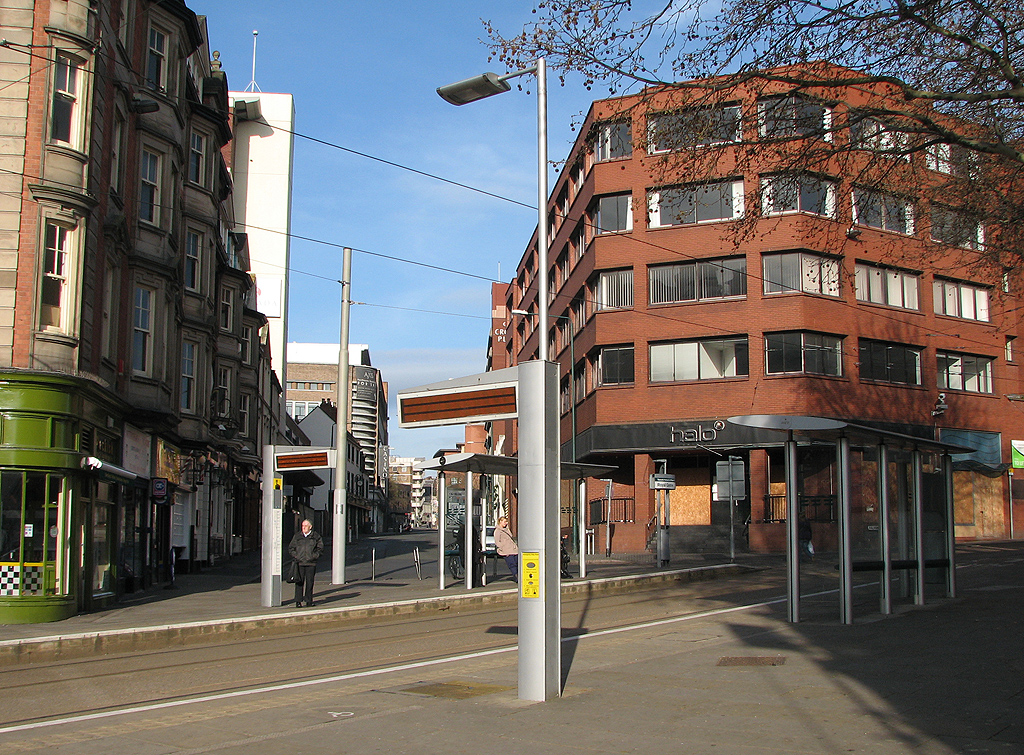

General information
- Location: Nottingham, City of Nottingham; England
- Coordinates: 52°57′19″N 1°09′08″W
- System: Nottingham Express Transit tram stop
- Owner: Nottingham Express Transit
- Operator: Nottingham Express Transit
- Line: 1 2
- Platforms: 2
- Tracks: 2

Construction
- Structure type: At grade; in street
- Accessible: Step-free access to platform

Key dates
- 9 March 2004: Opened

Services
Preceding station	NET	Following station
Nottingham Trent University towards Hucknall	Line 1	Old Market Square towards Toton Lane
Nottingham Trent University towards Phoenix Park	Line 2	Old Market Square towards Clifton South
Location
- Location within Nottinghamshire

Royal Centre is a tram stop of Nottingham Express Transit (NET) in the centre of the city of Nottingham. It derives its name from the adjacent Theatre Royal and the Royal Concert Hall. The stop is also close to the Cornerhouse, the Victoria Centre and the Newton Building of Nottingham Trent University, although much of the university's City Campus is closer to the Nottingham Trent University stop.

The stop is located on a section of Goldsmith's Street, between Talbot Street and Wollaton Street. The section was closed to normal traffic when the stop was installed in 2003, allowing trams to stop without blocking other road users. The tram stop has side platforms. A trailing crossover just to the north of the stop permits the termination of southbound trams in the stop, if circumstances prevent them continuing further into the city centre.

The tram stop opened on 9 March 2004, along with the rest of NET's initial system.

With the opening of NET's phase two, Royal Centre is now on the common section of the NET, where line 1, between Hucknall and Chilwell, and line 2, between Phoenix Park and Clifton, operate together. Trams on each line run at frequencies that vary between 4 and 8 trams per hour, depending on the day and time of day, combining to provide up to 16 trams per hour on the common section.

== Gallery ==
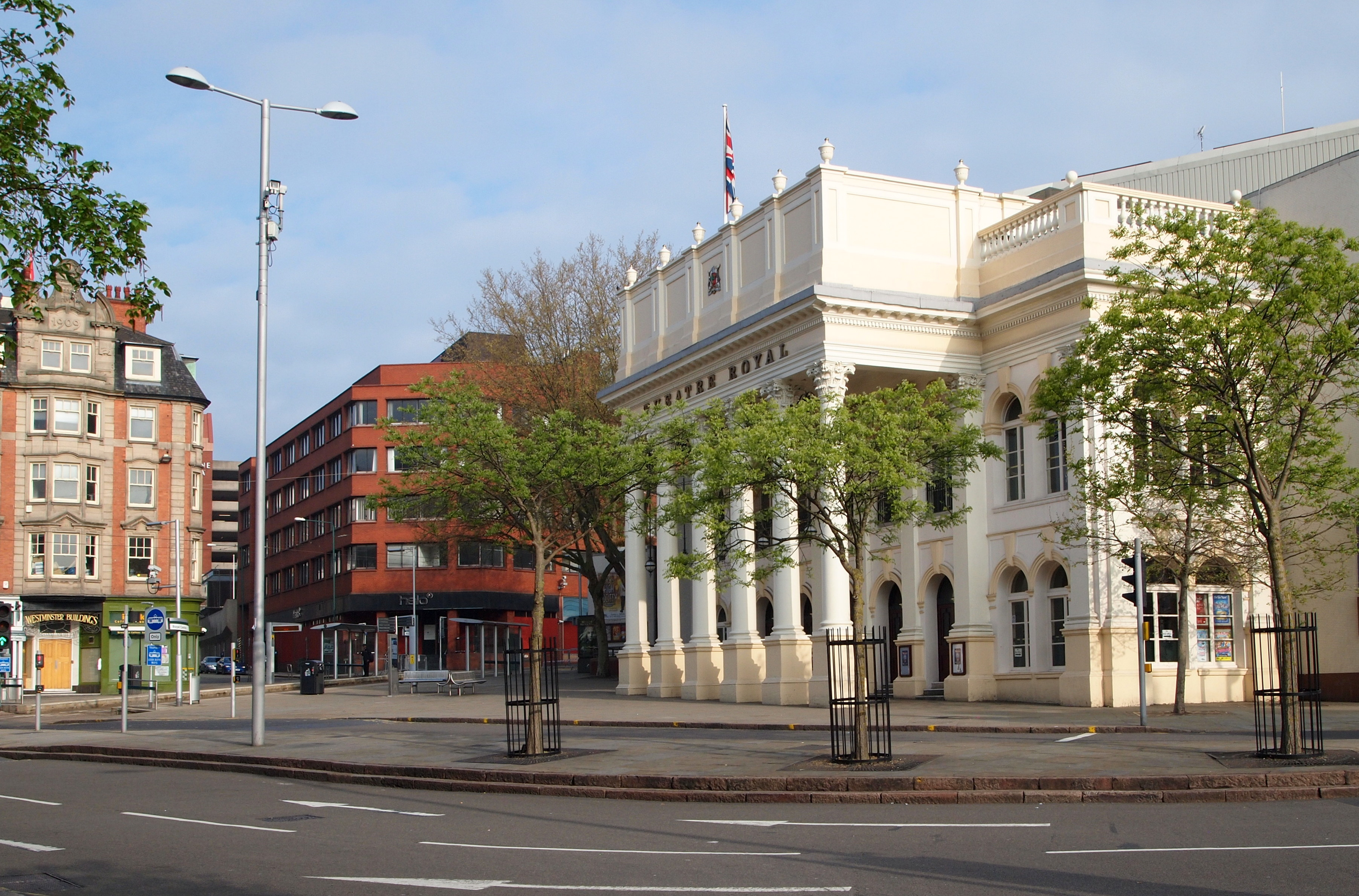
The tram stop, seen beyond the Theatre Royal frontage

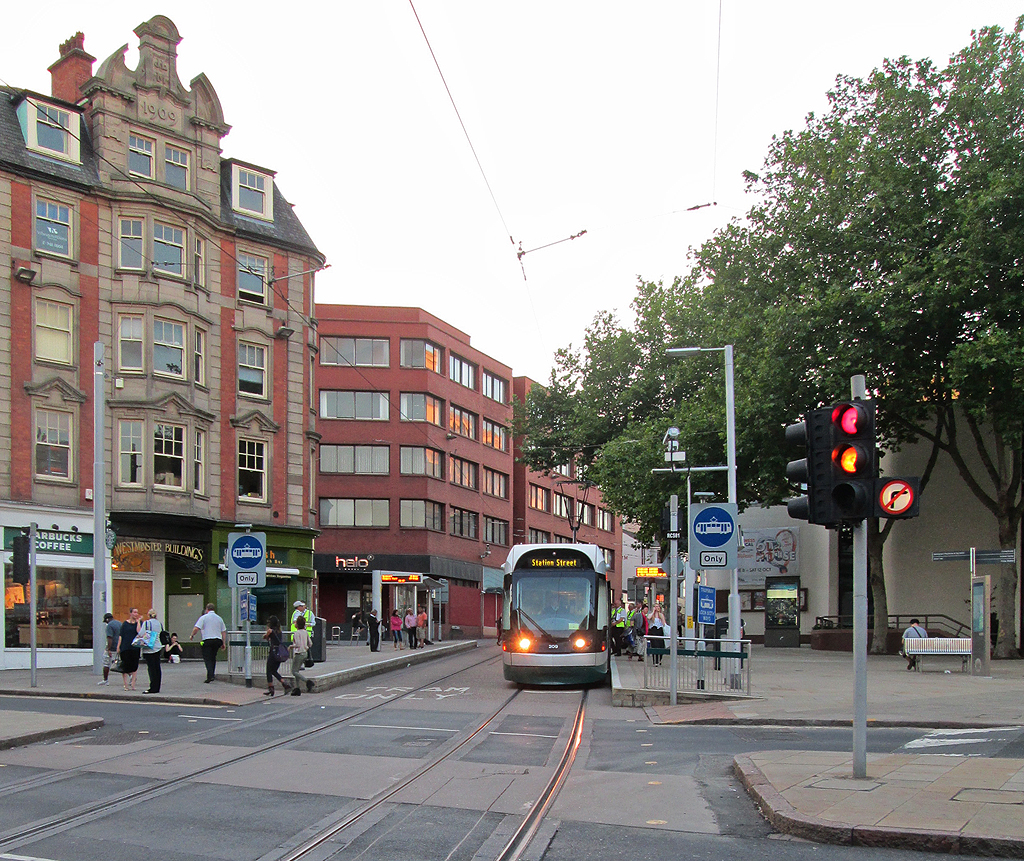
Tram stop looking north, showing tram only signs

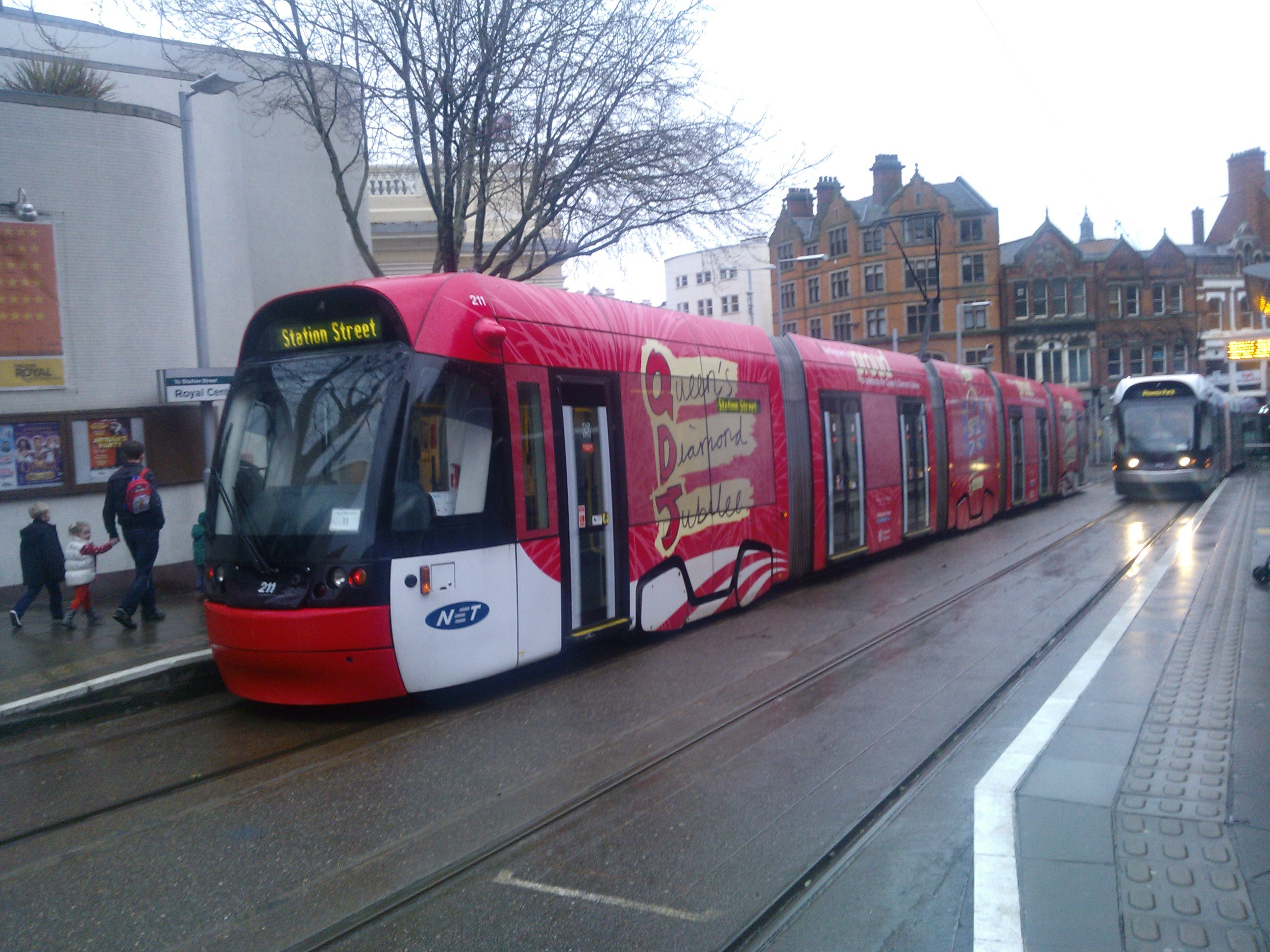
Tram stop looking south, with Theatre Royal to left
