= Nottingham Trent University tram stop =

Nottingham Express Transit tram stop

Nottingham Trent University
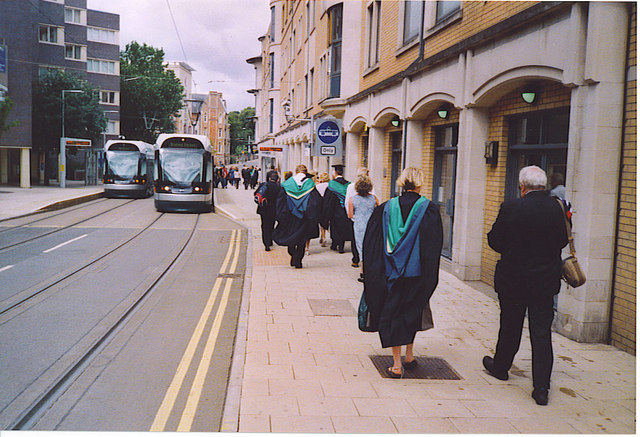

General information
- Location: Nottingham Trent University, The Arboretum, City of Nottingham; England
- Coordinates: 52°57′29″N 1°09′19″W
- System: Nottingham Express Transit tram stop
- Owner: Nottingham Express Transit
- Operator: Nottingham Express Transit
- Line: 1 2
- Platforms: 2
- Tracks: 2

Construction
- Structure type: At grade; in street
- Accessible: Step-free access to platform

Key dates
- 9 March 2004: Opened

Services
Preceding station	NET	Following station
High School towards Hucknall	Line 1	Royal Centre towards Toton Lane
High School towards Phoenix Park	Line 2	Royal Centre towards Clifton South
Location
- Location within Nottinghamshire

Nottingham Trent University is a tram stop on Nottingham Express Transit (NET) in the city of Nottingham suburb of the Arboretum. It is located in the centre of Nottingham Trent University's city campus, between the Boots Library and the Chaucer Building. The university's flagship Arkwright and Newton buildings are nearby to the south, although Newton is closer to the Royal Centre stop. On either side of the stop, the tram tracks share the road with other traffic, but only trams are permitted to pass through the stop itself. The stop has two side platforms on either side of the twin tracks.

The tram stop opened on 9 March 2004, along with the rest of NET's initial system.

With the opening of NET's phase two, Nottingham Trent University is now on the common section of the NET, where line 1, between Hucknall and Chilwell, and line 2, between Phoenix Park and Clifton, operate together. Trams on each line run at frequencies that vary between 4 and 8 trams per hour, depending on the day and time of day, combining to provide up to 16 trams per hour on the common section.

== Gallery ==
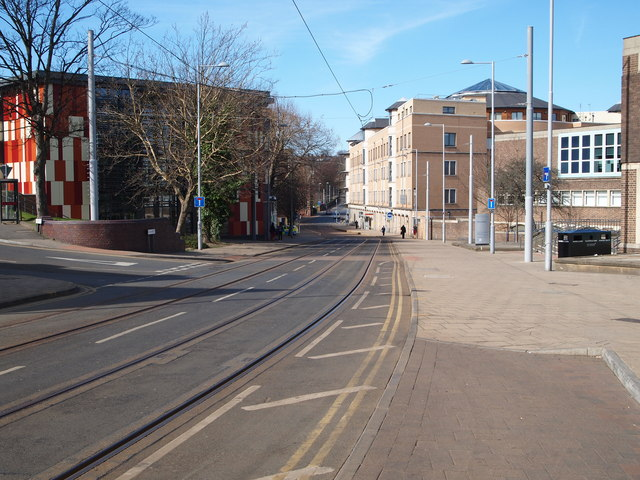
Route through the campus looking north

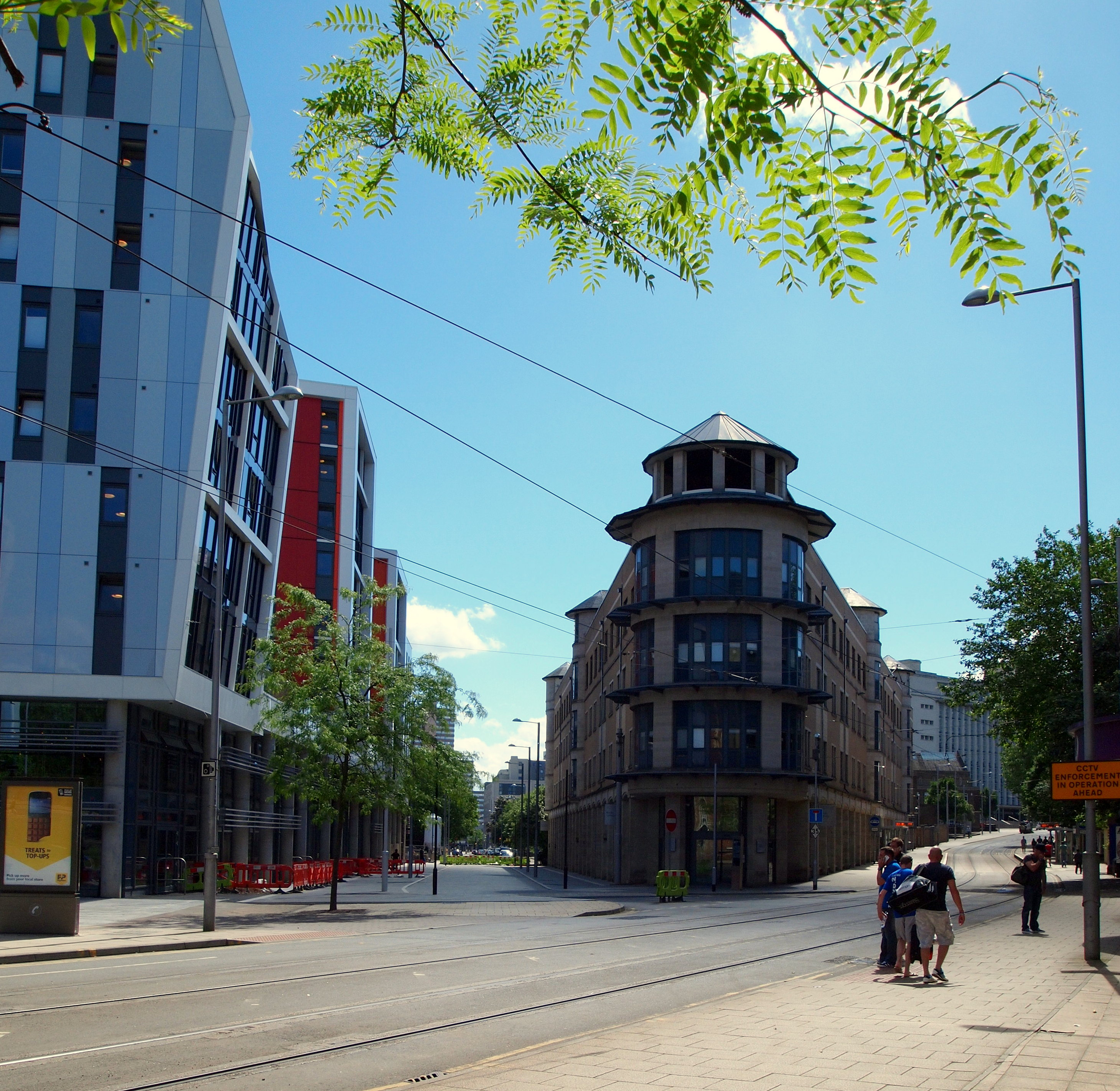
The tram stop is in the centre of the university

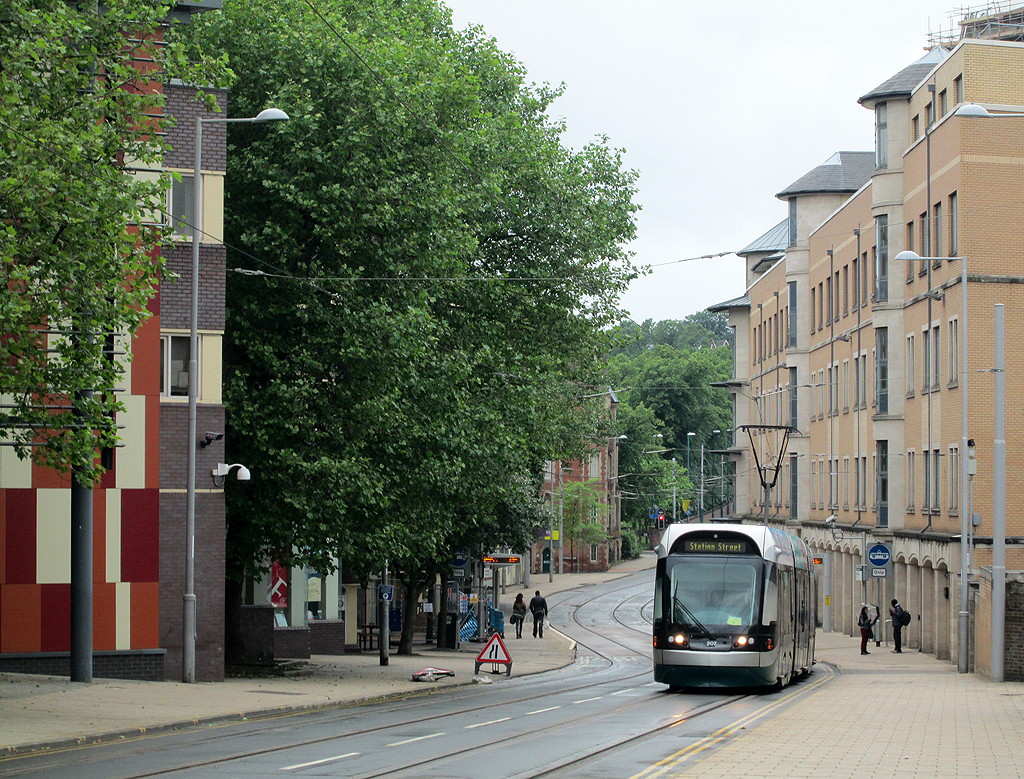
The stop, with sign and surface treatment to deter road traffic

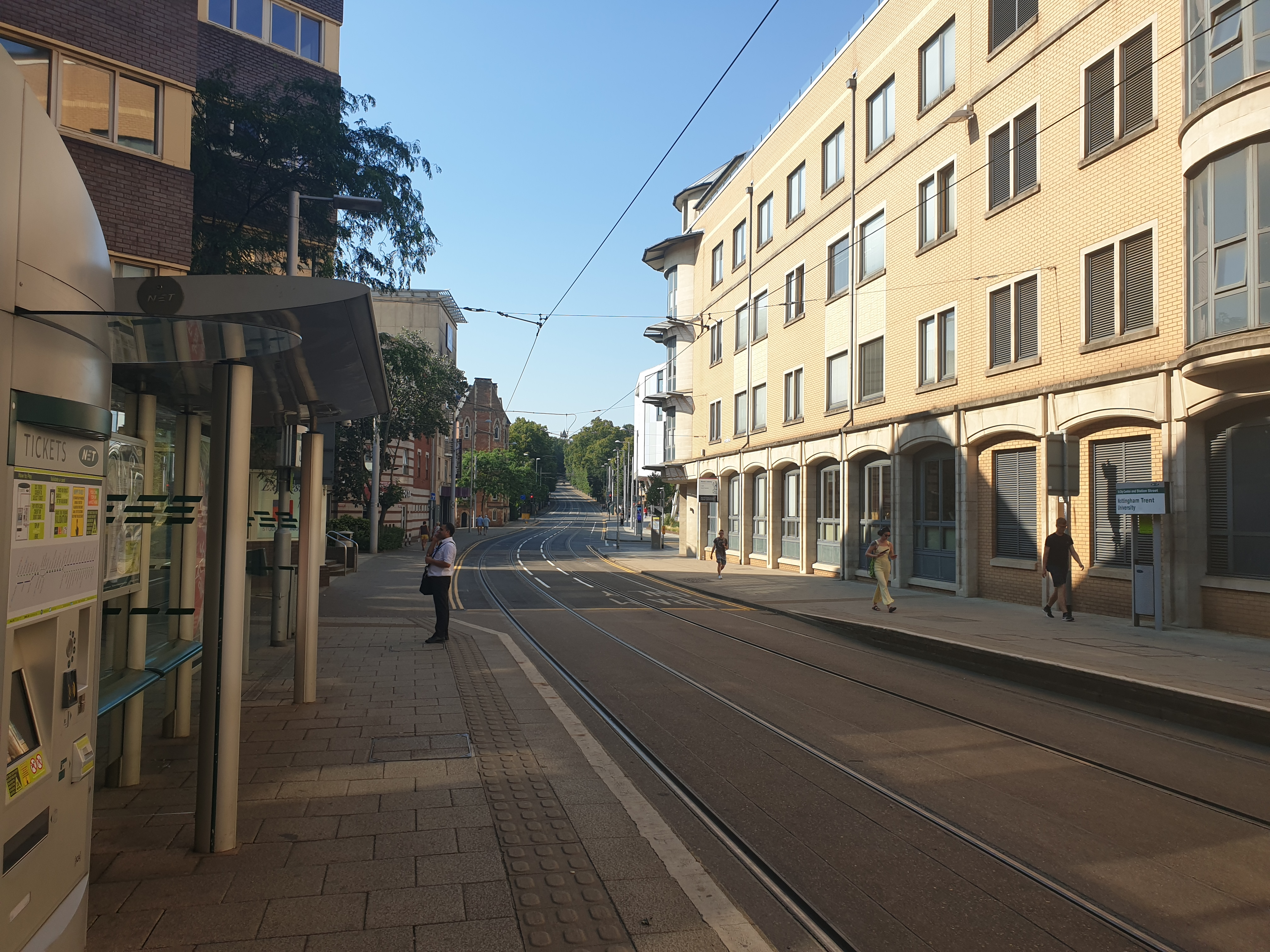
From the stop looking north

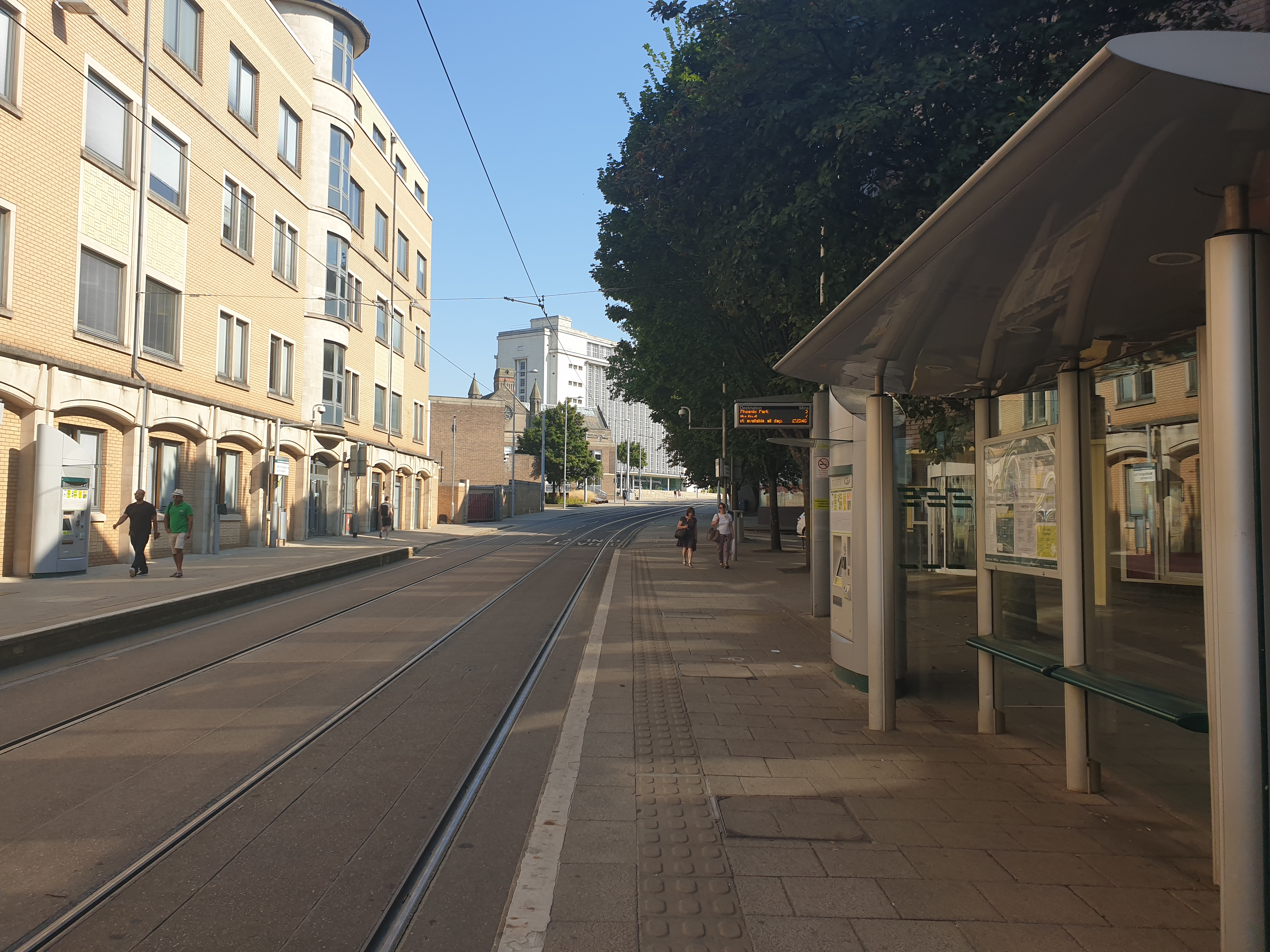
From the stop looking south
