= Lace Market tram stop =

Nottingham Express Transit tram stop

Lace Market
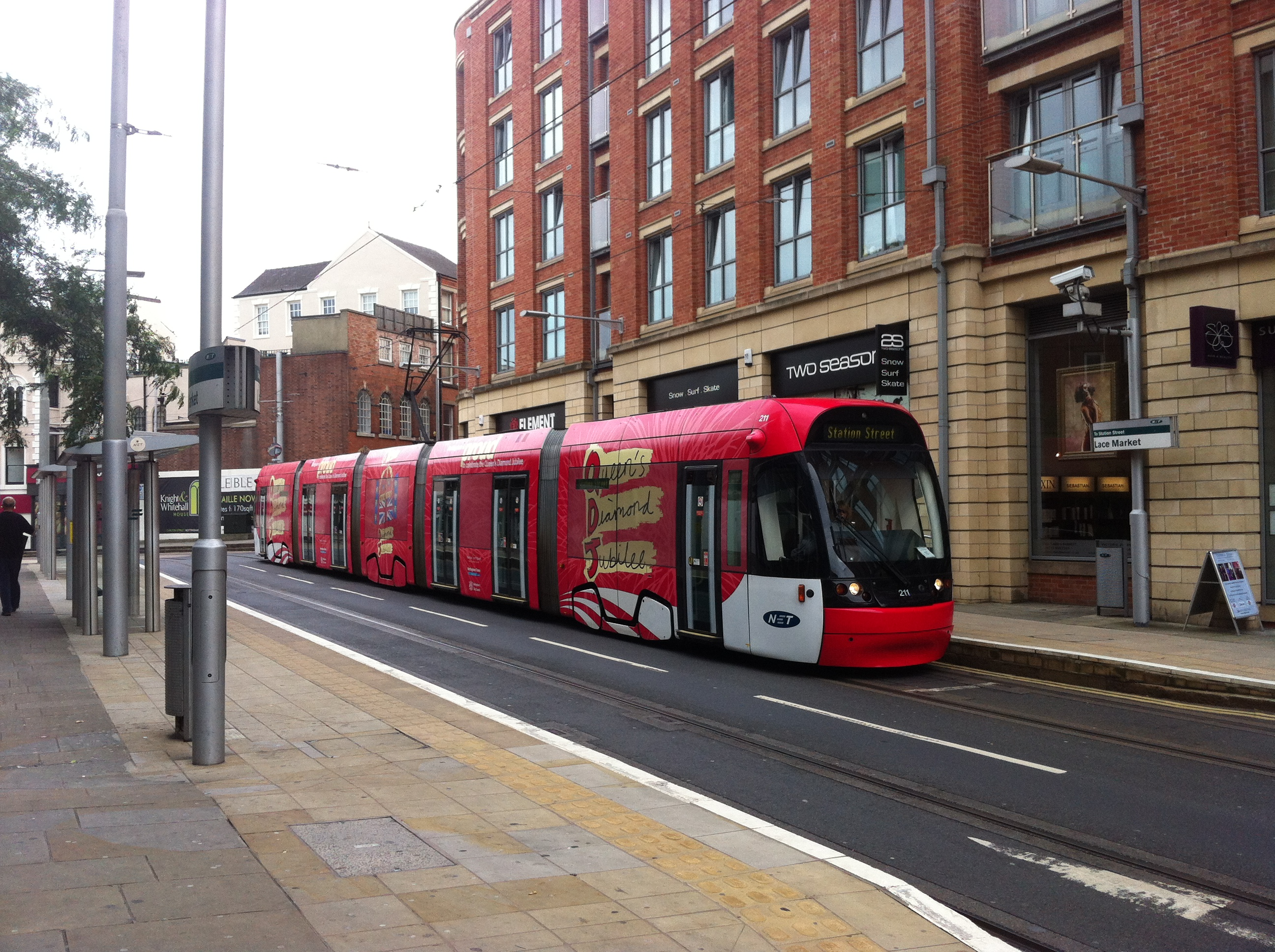

General information
- Location: Lace Market, Nottingham, City of Nottingham; England
- Coordinates: 52°57′10″N 1°08′44″W
- System: Nottingham Express Transit tram stop
- Owner: Nottingham Express Transit
- Operator: Nottingham Express Transit
- Line: 1 2
- Platforms: 2
- Tracks: 2

Construction
- Structure type: At grade; in street
- Accessible: Step-free access to platform

Key dates
- 9 March 2004: Opened

Services
Preceding station	NET	Following station
Old Market Square towards Hucknall	Line 1	Nottingham Station towards Toton Lane
Old Market Square towards Phoenix Park	Line 2	Nottingham Station towards Clifton South
Location
- Location within Nottinghamshire

Lace Market is a tram stop of the Nottingham Express Transit (NET) in the centre of the city of Nottingham. It is situated on Fletcher Gate in Nottingham's historic Lace Market quarter, from which it derives its name, and near to the Hockley quarter.

The tram stop has twin side platforms flanking the twin tram tracks. The tramway shares road space with other traffic in both directions. To the north of the stop, the track executes a 90 degree curve descend Victoria Street towards the Old Market Square tram stop. To the south, the track passes Weekday Cross before switching onto the former viaduct of the Great Central Railway in order to reach the Nottingham Station tram stop.

The tram stop opened on 9 March 2004, along with the rest of NET's initial system.

With the opening of NET's phase two, Lace Market is now on the common section of the NET, where line 1, between Hucknall and Chilwell, and line 2, between Phoenix Park and Clifton, operate together. Trams on each line run at frequencies that vary between 4 and 8 trams per hour, depending on the day and time of day, combining to provide up to 16 trams per hour on the common section.

== Gallery ==
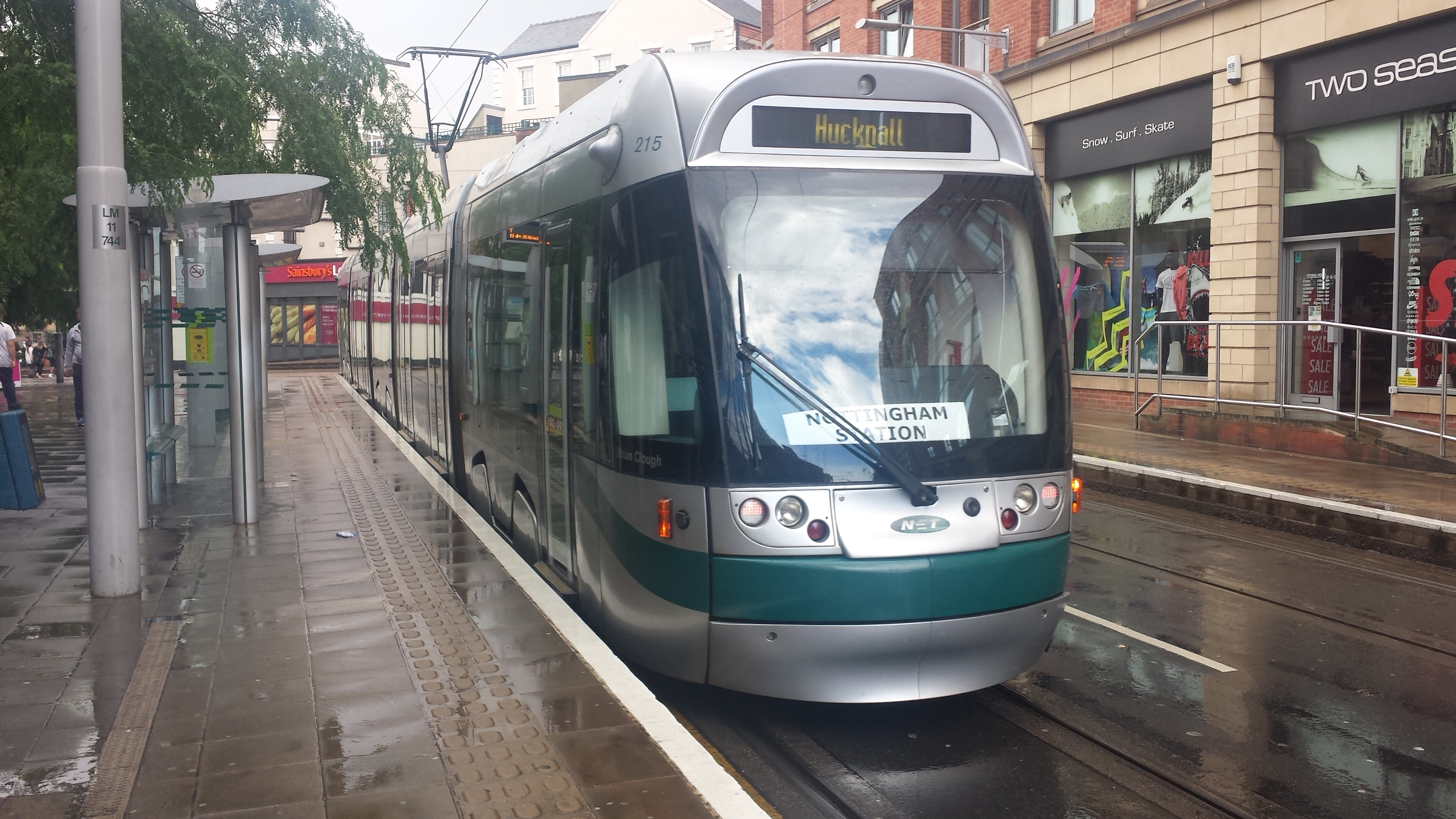
The tram stop looking north, towards the curve into Victoria Street

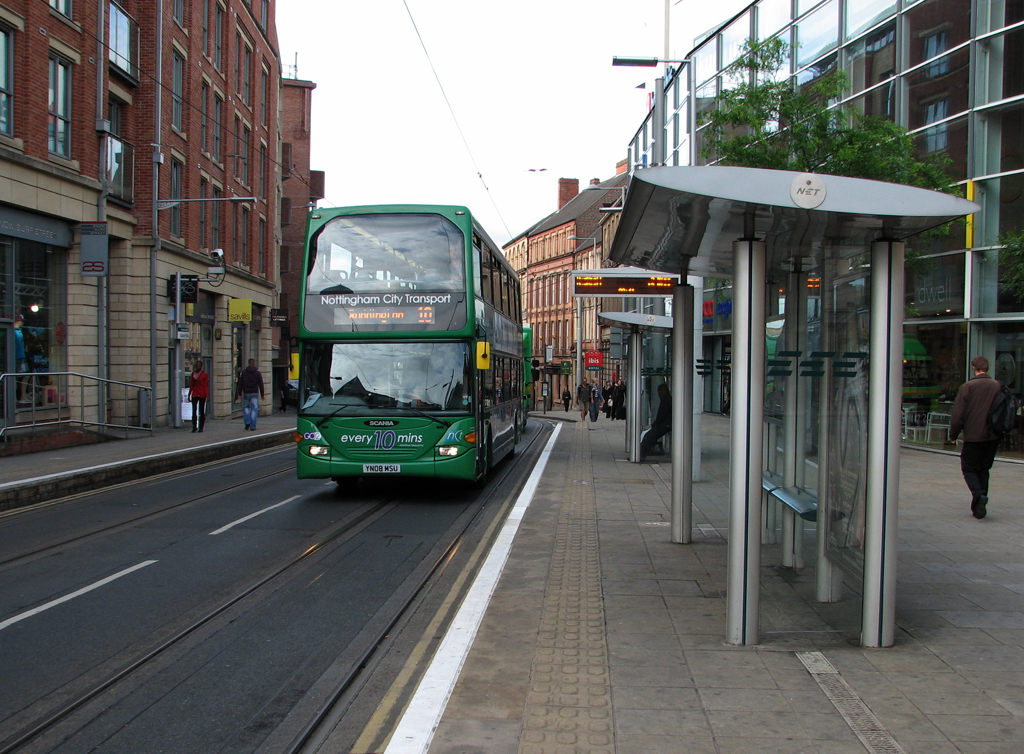
The tram stop looking south, as a bus passes through
