= Richard Trupp =

British sculptor (born 1973)

- Born: 1973 (age 52–53)

Richard Trupp (born 1973) is a British sculptor.

== Career ==
In 1999, Trupp spent a year working as Sir Anthony Caro’s assistant. Trupp was one of many assistants who worked on projects such as the Millennium Bridge, London and sculptures for the National Gallery ‘Encounters’ exhibition. Trupp’s MA show entitled ‘Fixing Blocks’ was held at the Royal British Society of Sculptors in 2000, where he was awarded full membership to the Royal British Society of Sculptors. In the same year, Trupp began working at Arch Bronze, a foundry in Putney, London. Here he worked on bronze sculptures by artists such as Marc Quinn, The Chapman Brothers, Gavin Turk, Eduardo Paolozzi and Rebecca Warren. Richard is currently Head of Workshops at Kingston School of Art.

== Sculpture ==
As described in the Jerwood Sculpture Prize catalogue:

"Trupp has been strongly influenced by a city that once rejoiced in the sobriquet 'the workshop of the world.' [He] relishes the monumental ironworks still surviving there, and relates his own attitude as a sculptor to the 'hands-on' attitude still found in this 'city of makers'."

Trupp’s work is "grounded in a deep respect for the history of sculpture and a curiosity about the myths that have grown up around it."

The Juggernaut of Nought installed outside Nottingham Trent's Arkwright Building is a tribute to his mentor Anthony Caro.
