= Old Market Square tram stop =

Nottingham Express Transit tram stop

Old Market Square
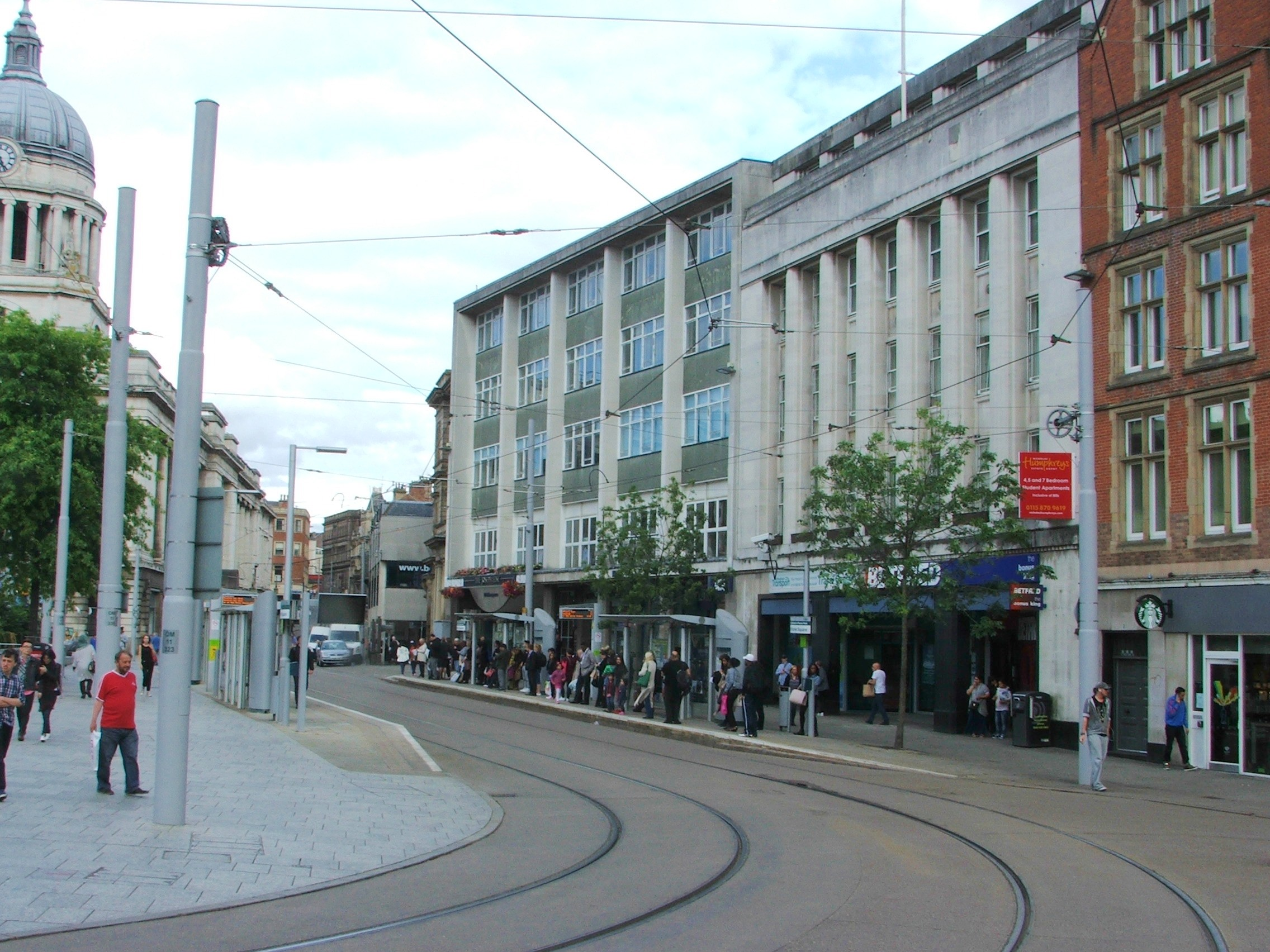

General information
- Location: Nottingham, City of Nottingham; England
- Coordinates: 52°57′11″N 1°09′00″W
- System: Nottingham Express Transit tram stop
- Owner: Nottingham Express Transit
- Operator: Nottingham Express Transit
- Line: 1 2
- Platforms: 2
- Tracks: 2

Construction
- Structure type: At grade; in street
- Accessible: Step-free access to platform

Key dates
- 9 March 2004: Opened

Services
| Preceding station | NET | Following station |
|---|---|---|
| Royal Centre towards Hucknall | Line 1 | Lace Market towards Toton Lane |
| Royal Centre towards Phoenix Park | Line 2 | Lace Market towards Clifton South |
Location
- Location within Nottinghamshire

Old Market Square is a tram stop of Nottingham Express Transit (NET) in the centre of the city of Nottingham. It is situated on the South Parade of Nottingham's Old Market Square, from which it derives its name, and is the most central of the system's stops. The location is a high-profile one, benefiting from the long views and high pedestrian footfall of the market square. It is also adjacent to the city's Council House, and is an important interchange point with the city's buses.

South Parade is part of a pedestrian area, which is closed to all vehicles except for trams and buses, and for delivery to adjoining premises. The tram stop has twin side platforms flanking the twin tram tracks. To the west of the stop, the track executes a 90 degree curve to run along the west side of the square, before proceeding up Market Street towards the Royal Centre tram stop. To the east of the stop, the track runs alongside the Council House before climbing Victoria Street towards the Lace Market tram stop.

The tram stop opened on 9 March 2004, along with the rest of NET's initial system.

With the opening of NET's phase two, Old Market Square is now on the common section of the NET, where line 1, between Hucknall and Chilwell, and line 2, between Phoenix Park and Clifton, operate together. Trams on each line run at frequencies that vary between 4 and 8 trams per hour, depending on the day and time of day, combining to provide up to 16 trams per hour on the common section.

== Gallery ==
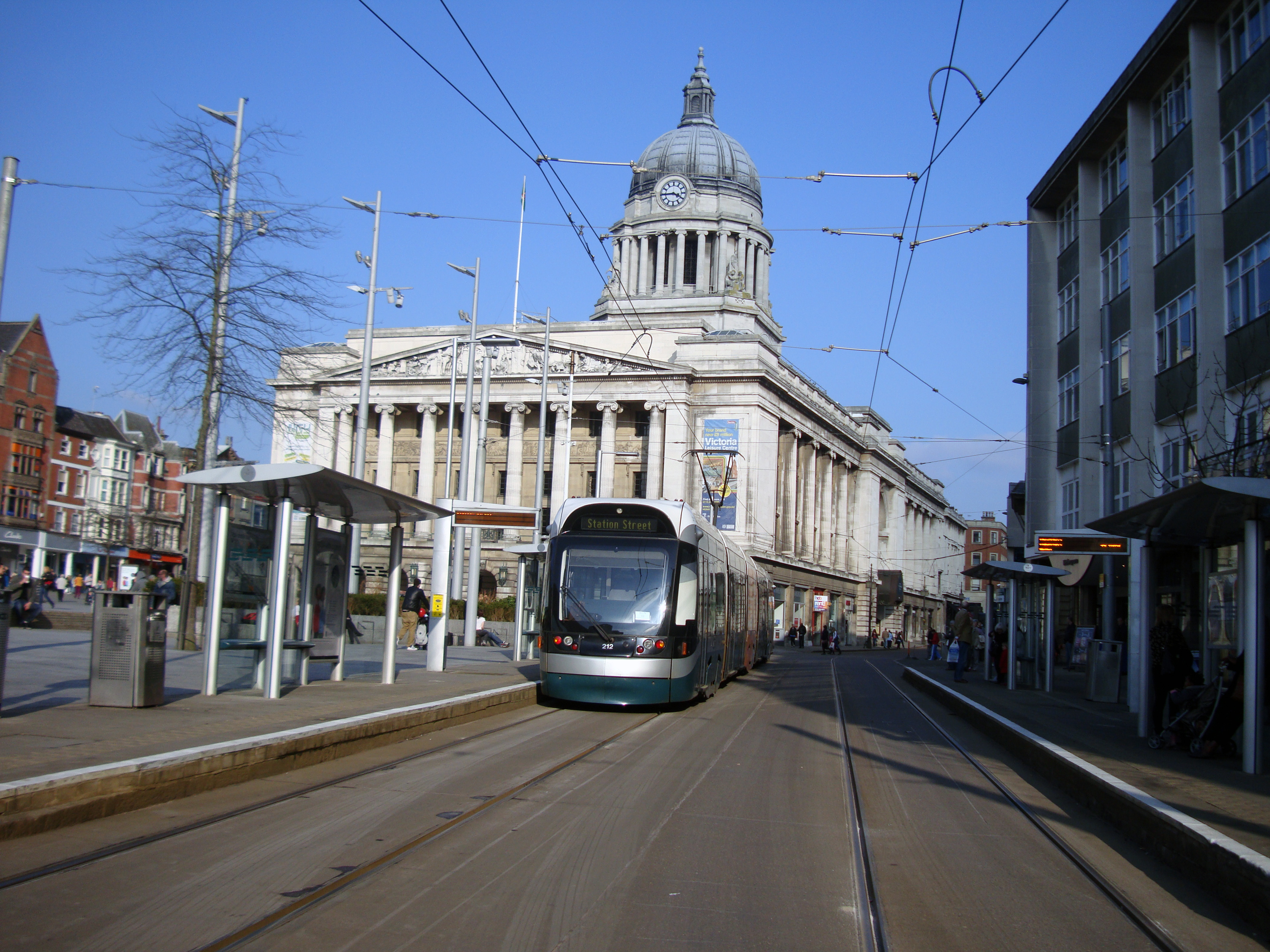
The tram stop looking east, with the Council House in the background

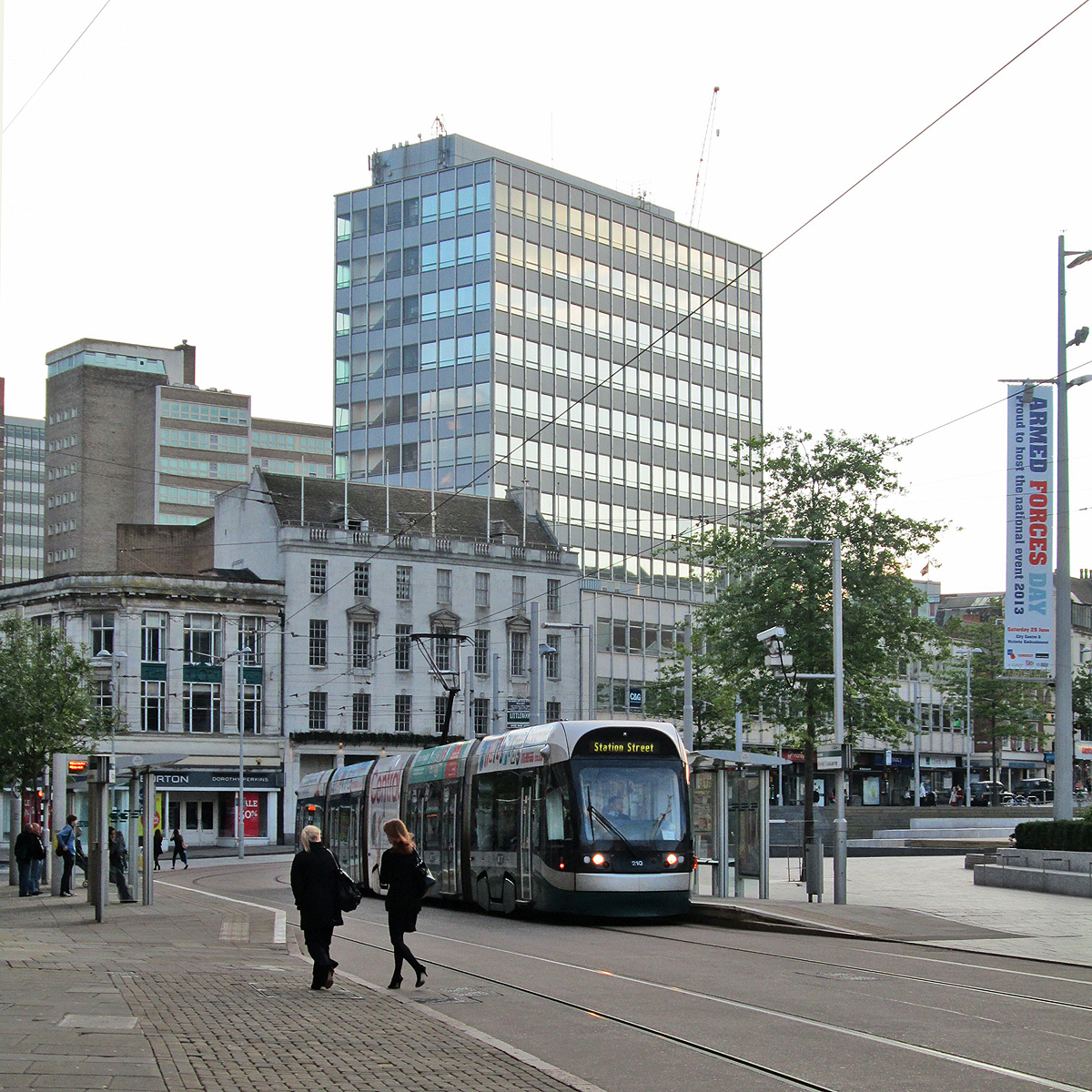
The tram stop looking west

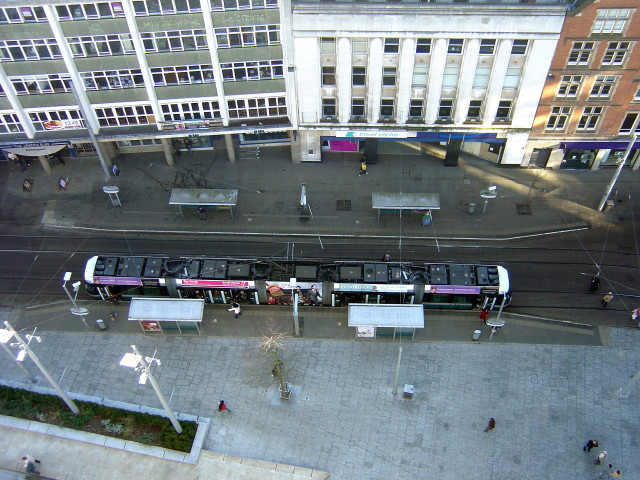
The tram stop seen from the Nottingham Eye ferris wheel
