= The Screen Room =

Coordinates: 52.9547°N 1.1446°W

The Screen Room was a 21-seat, single screen independent cinema in the Hockley area of Nottingham, England. It opened on 27 September 2002.

At the time it opened, it featured in the Guinness Book of Records as "the world's smallest cinema", beating an Australian cinema with 22 seats. That record was subsequently beaten by Palastkino, a nine-seat cinema in Germany.

The cinema mainly screened cult films and world cinema. It closed in 2011 but has since been reopened under the name Mammoth: A Climate Action Cinema, with a focus on environmental films and social issues.
