= Nottingham Royal Concert Hall =

Concert hall in Nottingham, England

Coordinates: 52°57′20″N 1°9′5″W

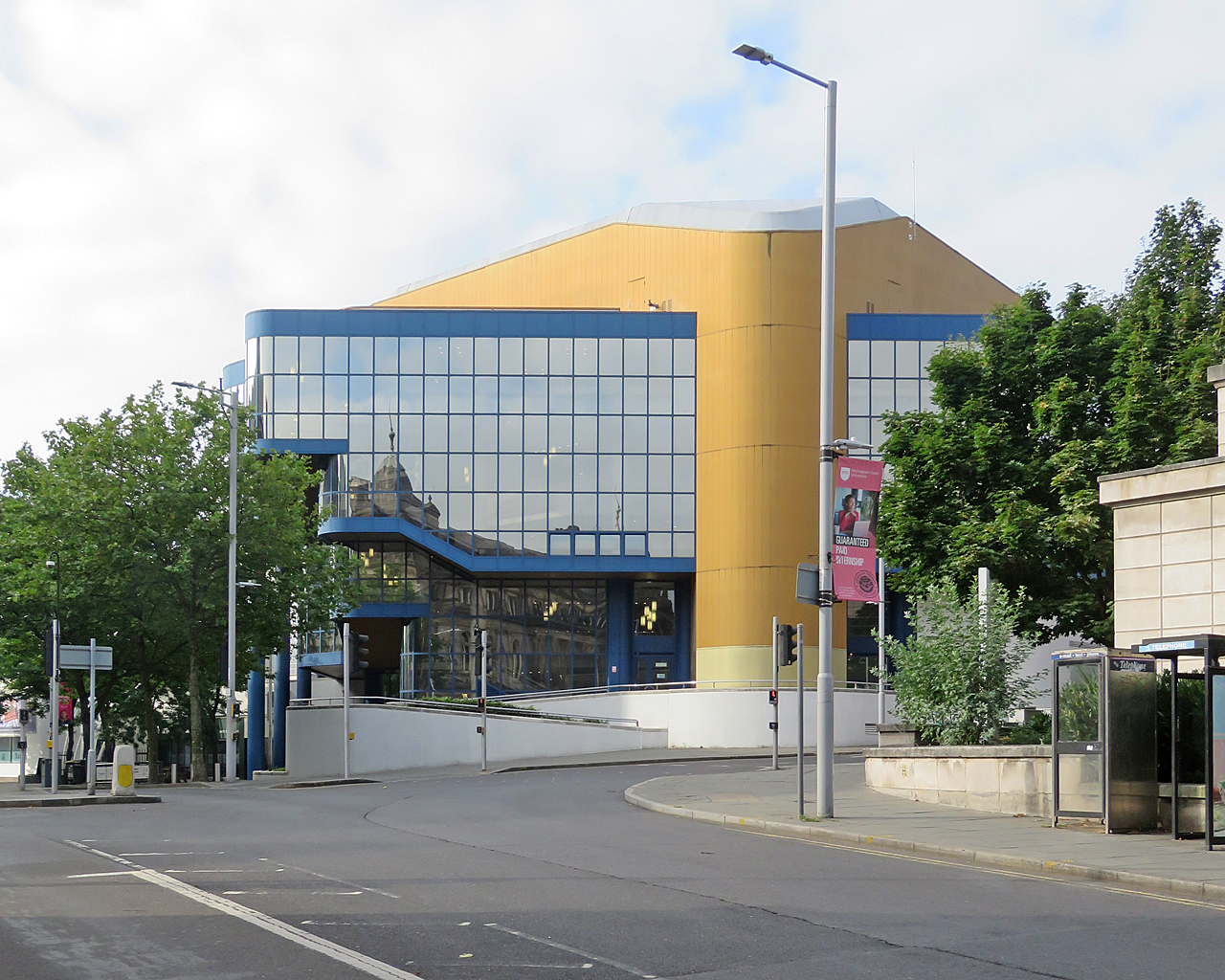
- Interactive map of Nottingham Royal Concert Hall
- Address: Theatre Square, Nottingham, NG1 5ND
- Owner: Nottingham City Council
- Capacity: 2,499 (3 levels)
- Type: Concert Hall/Auditorium
- Current use: Touring Venue

Construction
- Opened: 27 November 1982
- Years active: Since 1982
- Architect: RHWL (Renton Howard Wood Levin Partnership)

Website
- http://www.trch.co.uk

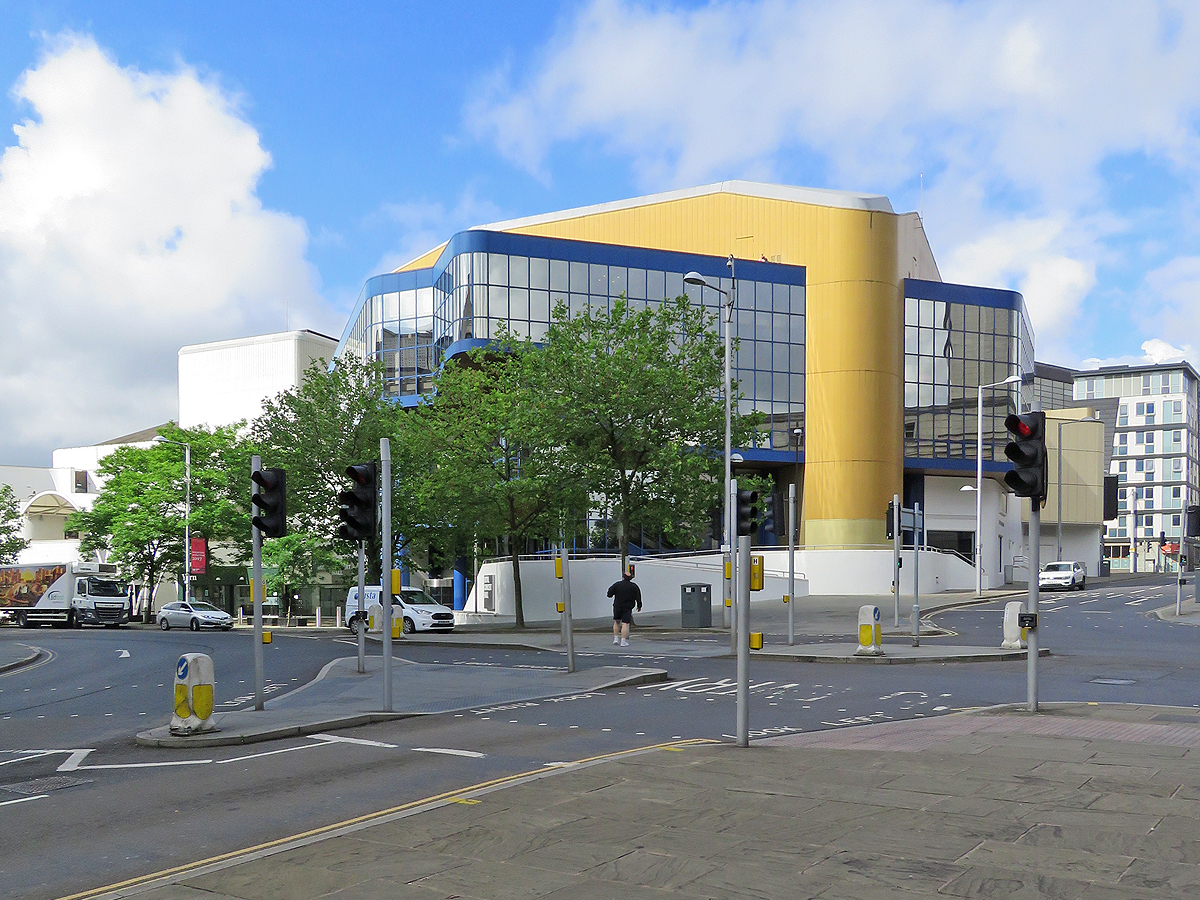
The exterior of the building

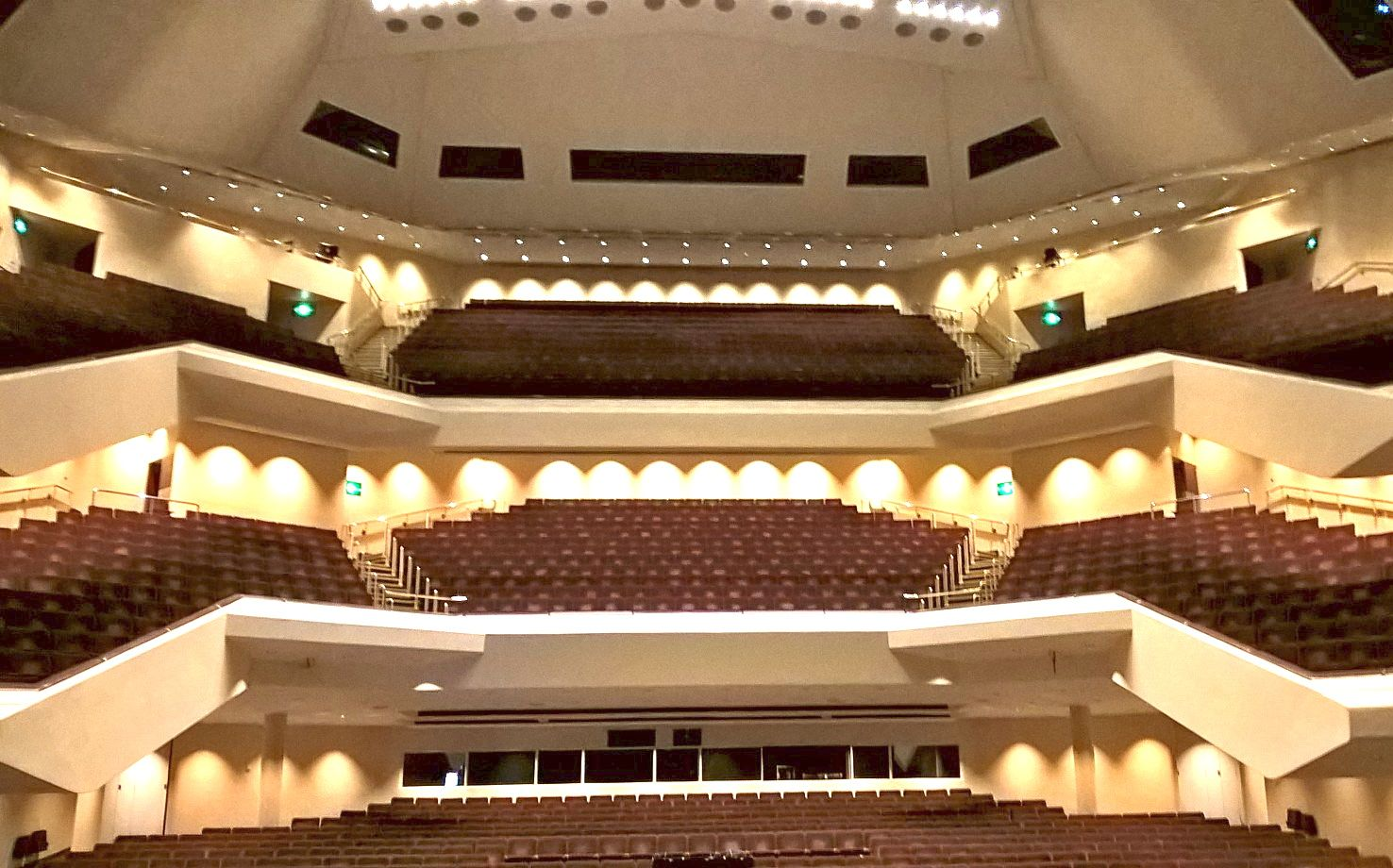
Inside the auditorium

Nottingham Royal Concert Hall is a concert hall in the English city of Nottingham. It is owned by Nottingham City Council and is part of a complex that also includes the city's Theatre Royal. The Royal Concert Hall's striking modern architecture has proved to be a city landmark at the heart of Nottingham City Centre, opposite the more recently built The Cornerhouse complex.

The concert hall is served by the adjacent Royal Centre tram stop on the Nottingham Express Transit.

== History ==
The site of the Royal Concert Hall was previously the old 'Empire Palace of Varieties' designed and built in 1898 by Frank Matcham. The Empire closed for the last time in 1958 and was demolished for road-widening in 1969.

Designed by the Renton Howard Wood Levin Partnership (architects of the Sheffield Crucible Theatre and Manchester's Bridgewater Hall), the hall cost £12 million to complete. The project's client was Nottingham City Council.

Work on the Royal Concert Hall began in 1980 and was completed in 1982, providing Nottingham with a contemporary 2,499-seater auditorium. The first artist to perform there was Elton John in November 1982.

== See also ==
- List of concert halls
