= Truppführer (modern) =

Truppführer (English: unit leader, troop leader) is the German term for the position of a unit/troop leader.

== Relief organization and disaster control service ==
In relief organizations, disaster control services, search and rescue teams, or technical assistance organizations, the Truppführer leads a small team of three to five individuals, usually contractors. The Truppführer is normally managed by a Gruppenführer, and acts as deputy or assistant Gruppenführer. At least two Trupps build a Gruppe (en: group).

== Fire brigade ==
Trupp self-contained (German fire-brigade)

In German fire-brigades, the Truppführer leads a team of up to two fireman. The proper name Feuerwehrtrupp (en: fire-brigade team) is the designation to the smallest firefighter sub-unit. The number of individuals per Feuerwehrtrupp may vary.

A fire-brigade Truppführer may also act as leader of a self-contained Feuerwehrtrupp, handling special missions and can proceed in the role as commander of the vehicle crew. In this function he may be superior to one Truppmann (en: Troop man) and one Maschinist (en: Machine man). The Truppführer of self-contained Feuerwehrtrupp is also qualified to act on higher qualification in the role as Gruppenführer.

=== Responsibilities ===
- meet the goals and objectives of the particular mission
- lead the Trupp in line in accordance with the security and safety of live regulations

== Bundeswehr ==
Trupp symbols Bundeswehr

general

sub-unit

(in lione to symbols in NATO)

Truppführer (short: TrpFr) may be the appointment or function designation of a person in uniform in the modern day German Bundeswehr. Normally one is authorized, mandated and competent to command, control, or lead (permanent or temporary) a Trupp (sub-subunit or small military team below platoon level) that – depending on the service, branch, or branch of service – normally contains two to six members.

Corresponding designations to Trupp / Truppführer in Anglophone armed forces are “party“, “patrol“ or “team“ (e.g. support team, machine gun teams, mortar teams, sniper teams, … etc.) / “leader“ (short: … LDR, L).

In the Bundeswehr some Trupps form a Gruppe (en: group); three to four groups build a Zug (en: platoon). To the appointment of Truppführer might be assigned normally an enlisted rank (up to OR-3) or a junior NCO (OR-4). However, in the German special command and support troops (de: Führungsunterstützungstruppen) a Truppführer might be appointed higher ranks as well.

=== Examples to Truppführer / sub-unit leader ===
- Mechanised infantry (de:Panzergrenadiertruppe): Truppführer Schützentrupp (from the armoured vehicle dismounted Schützentrupp)
- Signal troops (de: Fernmeldetruppe): Funktruppführer
- Maintenance troops (de:Instandsetzungstruppe): Instandsetzungstruppführer
- Artillery troops (de: Artillerietruppe): Geschützführer (commander of a gun crew)
- Armoured troops (de: Panzertruppe): Panzerkommandant (crew commander of an armoured vehicle / battle tank)
- Company/ Battery troop commander (de: Kompanietruppführer / Batterietruppführer: commands as sub-unit leader the Kompanietrupp, respectively in *artillery troops and anti aircraft troops the Battery troop (de: Batterietrupp (new: Stabsdienstbearbeiter SK (StDstBeabr SK))

=== Designation ===
Military symbol – Trupp / Truppführer (2 – 7 men) – in NATO-armed forces:

- One single point (● Trupp / Truppführer general); respectively
- One lying rectangle with one point above (Trupp as single sub-unit) on military maps

== See also ==
- Comparative ranks of Nazi Germany
