= The Cornerhouse, Nottingham =

Leisure complex in Nottingham, England

Coordinates: 52.9555°N 1.1508°W

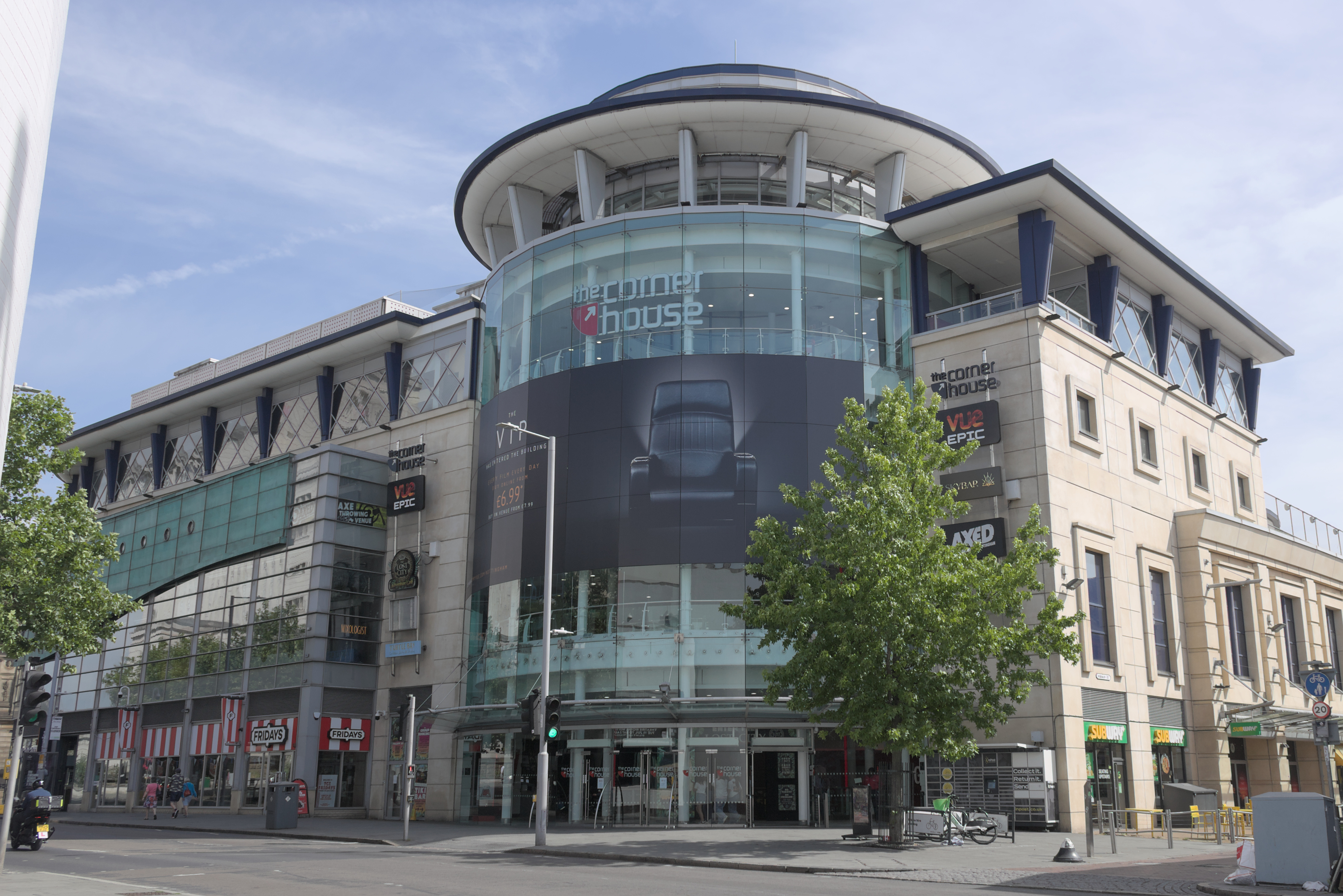
The Cornerhouse

The Cornerhouse is a leisure complex in the city centre of Nottingham, England.

Built on the former site of Nottingham's local paper, The Nottingham Evening Post, its attractions include a number of bars and restaurants, a multi-screen cinema operated by Vue, a large nightclub called Unit 13, Axe throwing, an array of Bars and Restaurants and an indoor adventure golf course.

It is smaller than its neighbouring complexes — Victoria Centre, the Royal Concert Hall and the Theatre Royal — but is bigger than the recently built Trinity Square development.
