= Theatre Royal, Nottingham =

Theatre in Nottingham, England

Coordinates: 52.9556°N 1.1517°W

Theatre Royal Nottingham
- The theatre’s logo, incorporating the city’s coat of arms

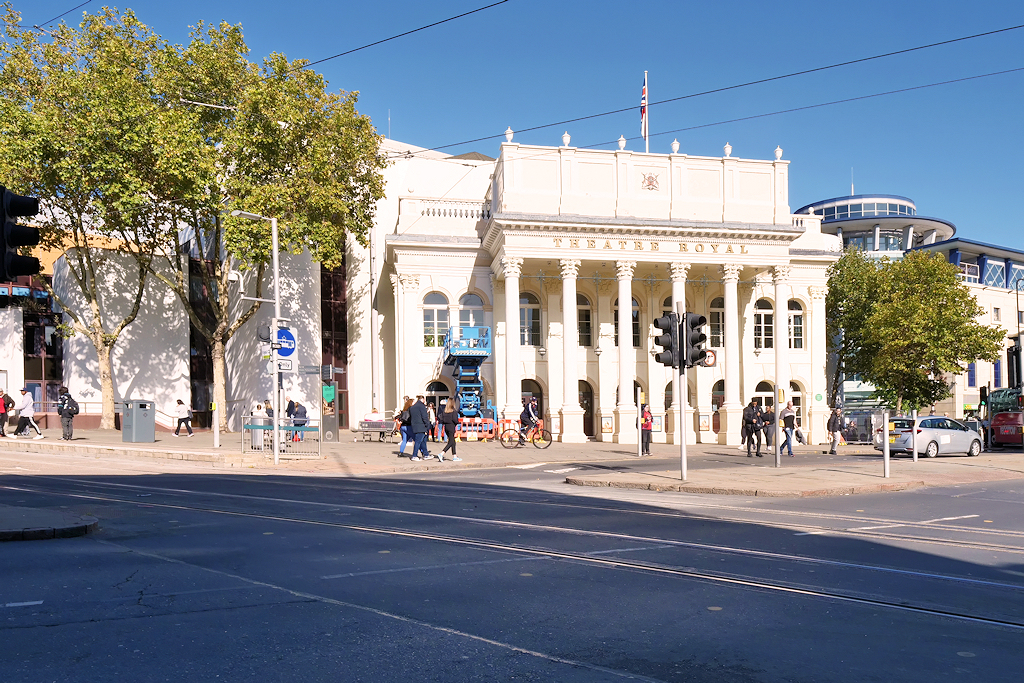
- Interactive map of Theatre Royal Nottingham
- Address: Theatre Square, Nottingham, NG1 5ND
- Owner: Nottingham City Council
- Capacity: 1,186 (4 levels)
- Type: Proscenium arch theatre
- Current use: Touring venue

Construction
- Opened: 1865
- Architect: Charles J. Phipps

Website
- trch.co.uk

The Theatre Royal in Nottingham, England, is a theatre venue in the heart of Nottingham City Centre and is owned by Nottingham City Council as part of a complex that also includes the city's Royal Concert Hall. The Theatre Royal attracts major touring dramas, opera, ballet, West End musicals and an annual pantomime.

== History ==
The Theatre Royal was completed in 1865, after six months of work and costing the clients of Nottingham Theatre Company, owned by lace manufacturers John and William Lambert, £15,000. The Classic façade and Corinthian columns designed by Charles J. Phipps are still a major Nottingham landmark.

The Theatre Royal opened on Monday, 25 September 1865 with Sheridan’s The School for Scandal. Its managers staged the full range of productions. For some six years to early 1897 the manager was H. Cecil Beryl before he went off on his own account to operate and then buy theatres in Glasgow including its Royal Princess`s Theatre.

The new lessee from 1897 was the newly formed limited company The Robert Arthur Theatres Ltd which had theatres in Scotland such as Her Majesty`s in Dundee and in England, such as the Theatre Royal, Newcastle. Robert Arthur, from Glasgow, now floated his company on the Stock Exchange. He presented the whole range of acclaimed plays, opera, revues and pantomimes until the company ran out of funds in 1912. At this point Michael Simons also of Glasgow, chairman and founder of Howard & Wyndham Ltd, became chairman of the Robert Arthur group with the Arthur theatres now operated under the same directors and managers of Howard & Wyndham. When the long lease ended in 1924 the theatre was bought outright by Moss Empires.

Baroness Orczy’s The Scarlet Pimpernel (1903) was first produced at the Theatre Royal by Fred Terry and Julia Neilson before being published as a novel. Although initially the play was met with little success, the novel is credited with influencing the mystery genre and arguably creating the ‘masked hero’ genre.

On October 6, 1952, the theatre made history with the world premiere of The Mousetrap (as part of a pre-West End tour). The play has gone on to be the longest-running theatrical production in the world. Two years later William Douglas Home's comedy The Manor of Northstead premiered there before transferring to the West End.

=== Phipps’ Building – 1865 ===
The elegant portico, with its six Corinthian columns of Ancaster stone; owe much to the desire of the Lamberts to build a prestigious theatre. Indeed, the orientation of the portico was designed to afford maximum effect, closing a new street from the Great Market Place, Market Street (originally named Theatre Street).

The original capacity was 2,200, made up as follows:

Dress Circle - 250
Private Boxes - 50
Upper Boxes - 250
Pit - 850
Gallery - 800

=== Matcham’s remodelling – 1897 ===
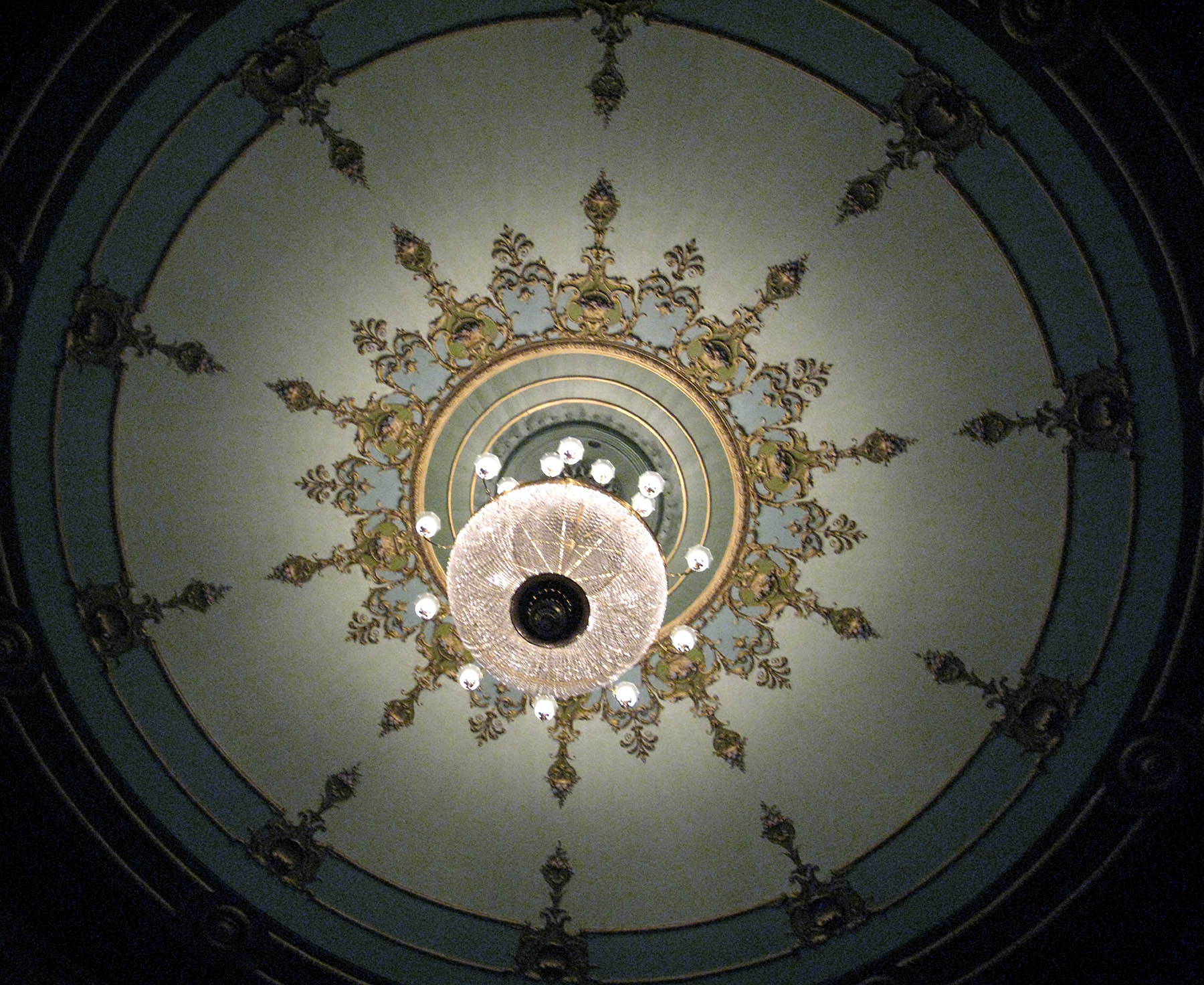
Matcham's "Sunburner" lighting at the venue

The noted theatrical architect Frank Matcham was engaged to build the new Empire Palace of Varieties next door. The Theatre Royal was closed between the end of April and September 1897 for remodelling. The works included building new dressing rooms at the rear to clear part of the site for the Empire. Matcham also refashioned the existing auditorium.

Matcham pioneered the use of cantilevered steel in his designs, and patented his design. This allowed balconies to be built without the use of supporting pillars; which had characterised the work of the previous generation of theatre architects, such as Phipps. Without pillars, lowering the stage and increasing the rake of the tiers: sight lines were much improved and the audience capacity increased to around 3,000.

=== Council Ownership and Modernisation ===
In 1969 the city council bought the theatre and began restoring it at a cost of £4 million in the day. It was in need of restoration and had earned a reputation as one of the worst theatres for backstage conditions in the country. The theatre was extensively remodelled and extended in 1976-78 by Nicholas Thompson and Clare Ferraby of the Renton Howard Wood Levin Partnership and Iain Mackintosh of Theatre Projects Consultants Ltd. It was officially reopened 6 June 1978 by Princess Anne who was “impressed and delighted” and said “…what an improvement on the old place. All you had there was the smell of gas.” Inside she met with “…City Council leader Coun. Jack Green…” and unveiled a plaque in the foyer.

=== The building today ===
The theatre has four tiers of seating, the stalls, dress circle, upper circle and balcony with a total capacity of 1,186 seats. It has seven fully licensed bars including The Green Room Cafe Bar on the ground floor and The Restaurant on the dress circle level. In the second half of 2019 into 2020 the premises were refurbished and re-decorated.

The theatre is served by the adjacent Royal Centre tram stop on the Nottingham Express Transit.

== Pantomime ==
The theatre has an annual pantomime, usually starring local or national celebrities. Some of them were;

- 2022 Snow White with Joe Pasquale, Faye Tozer, David Robbins and Jamal Crawford.
- 2021 Robin Hood with Tristan Gemmill, Matthew Kelly, Matt Terry, Jodie Prenger and Flawless. *Phil Butler was originally scheduled to appear, before his death.
- 2020 Sleeping Beauty with Paul Chuckle, Flawless, Ben Nickless and David Robbins
- 2019 Cinderella with Les Dennis, Connor McIntyre, Gareth Gates, Richard Cadell and Sooty
- 2018 Peter Pan with Joe Pasquale and John Challis
- 2017 Beauty and the Beast with Sherrie Hewson Ben Richards Ben Nickless & Andrew Ryan
- 2016 Jack and the Beanstalk with the Chuckle Brothers, Chico and Tony Maudsley
- 2015 Aladdin with Christopher Biggins, Simon Webbe & Ben Nickless
- 2014 Snow White with Lesley Joseph, Sam Attwater, Ben Nickless and Andrew Ryan.
- 2013 Peter Pan with David Hasselhoff, Su Pollard and Barney Harwood.
- 2012 Cinderella with John Partridge, Sheila Ferguson, David Robbins, Martin Ramsdin and The Grumbleweeds.
- 2011 Sleeping Beauty with Joe Pasquale and Ceri Dupree.
- 2010 Aladdin with Stephen Mulhern and Gray O'Brien.
- 2009 Jack and the Beanstalk with Nigel Havers and Jenna-Louise Coleman.
- 2008 Cinderella with Brian Conley.
- 2007 Peter Pan with Debra Stephenson and John Challis.
- 2006 Aladdin with Basil Brush, Christopher Biggins and Claire Sweeney.
- 2005 Snow White with Claire Sweeney and Keavy Lynch.
- 2004 Dick Whittington with Kevin Kennedy and Colin Baker.
- 2003 Peter Pan with Joe Pasquale and Leslie Grantham.
- 2002 Cinderella with Bobby Davro and Alex Lovell.
- 2001 Aladdin with Cannon and Ball and Sooty.
- 2000 Jack and the Beanstalk with the Chuckle Brothers and Bonnie Langford.
- 1999 Snow White with Lionel Blair, Linda Lusardi, Roger Kitter, Samuel Kane, Kev Orkian and Mick Walter.
- 1998 Dick Whittington with Lesley Joseph, John Nettles and Hilary Minster.
- 1997 Cinderella with Bradley Walsh and Judy Cornwell.
- 1996 Peter Pan with Russ Abbot, Chloe Newsome and Larry Dann.
- 1993 Mother Goose with Frank Windsor and Maggie Moonie.
- 1991 Cinderella with Anne Charleston.
- 1985 Aladdin with The Patton Brothers, Jimmy Cricket and Barbara Windsor.
- 1981 Aladdin with Barbara Windsor, Keith Harris and Billy Dainty.
- 1979 Cinderella with Windsor Davies and Don Estelle
- 1978 Mother Goose with John Inman
- 1975 Robin Hood with The Patton Brothers.
- 1974 Jack and the Beanstalk with Little and Large and Dorothy Dampier
- 1971 Cinderella with Dickie Henderson and Arthur Askey

== See also ==
- Royal Concert Hall, Nottingham
- Nottingham Playhouse
- Nottingham City Centre
