= Hockley, Nottingham =

Area of Nottingham, England

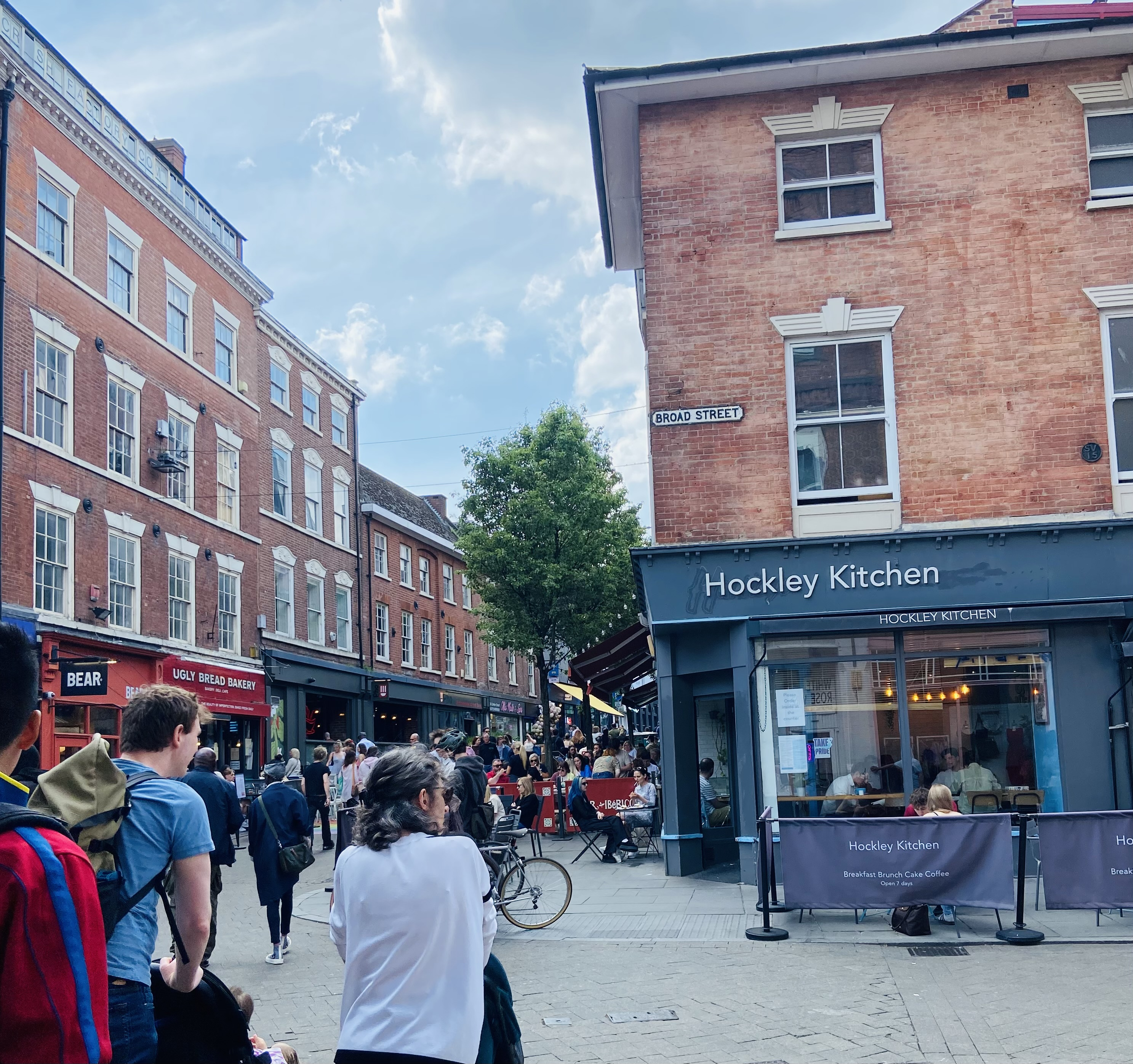
- Broad Street
- Interactive map of Hockley, Nottingham
- Coordinates: 52°57′15″N 1°08′38″W

Hockley is an area near the city centre of Nottingham, England. It lies adjacent to the Lace Market area and contains multiple well-preserved Victorian buildings. There has been a mercantile presence in the area since at least the 13th century. With many bars, restaurants and clothes shops, it is a vibrant and modern area of the city. It has been described as "the Soho of Nottingham." The areas covers the streets of Broad, Carlton, Heathcote and Goose Gate.

== History ==
From around 1285, the area was called "Walker Gate" after the practice of "walking" or stamping upon cloth to make it softer after weaving.

Until the 20th century, Nottingham's fortunes were tied to the "rag trade" (cloth industry). From 1343 to 1345 the price of wool in Nottingham Market was taken as the standard for the whole of England.

Hockley has not always been an affluent area: Sir Jesse Boot, son of the founder of Boots the Chemist and the architect of the company's modern business empire, was born in poverty in the area in 1850.

== Culture ==
Hockley is home to many shops (ranging from design and fashion to New Age and music), as well as many galleries, bars and cafés.

Carlton Street, Hockley

The area boasts an independent cinema, Broadway Cinema, which was the first cinema in the United Kingdom to show Quentin Tarantino's Pulp Fiction following its premiere at the Cannes Film Festival.

Hockley was also home to The Screen Room, which was (at the time) the world's smallest commercial cinema, as confirmed by the Guinness Book of Records. It had 21 seats and a single screen. It opened in 2002 and closed in 2011.

In 2022 Hockley was named by The Times as one of “the coolest places in the UK to move in.” Giving their reasons for the choice, The Times mentioned Hockley’s graffiti murals, warehouse clubs to indie spots, cocktail bars and caves.

== Rainbow Quarter ==
Plans are in place for a rainbow quarter in Hockley which will consist of Broad Street, Carlton Street and Heathcote Street. This will aim to provide a LGBTQ friendly area to rival the areas of Manchester and Brighton Gay Villages.

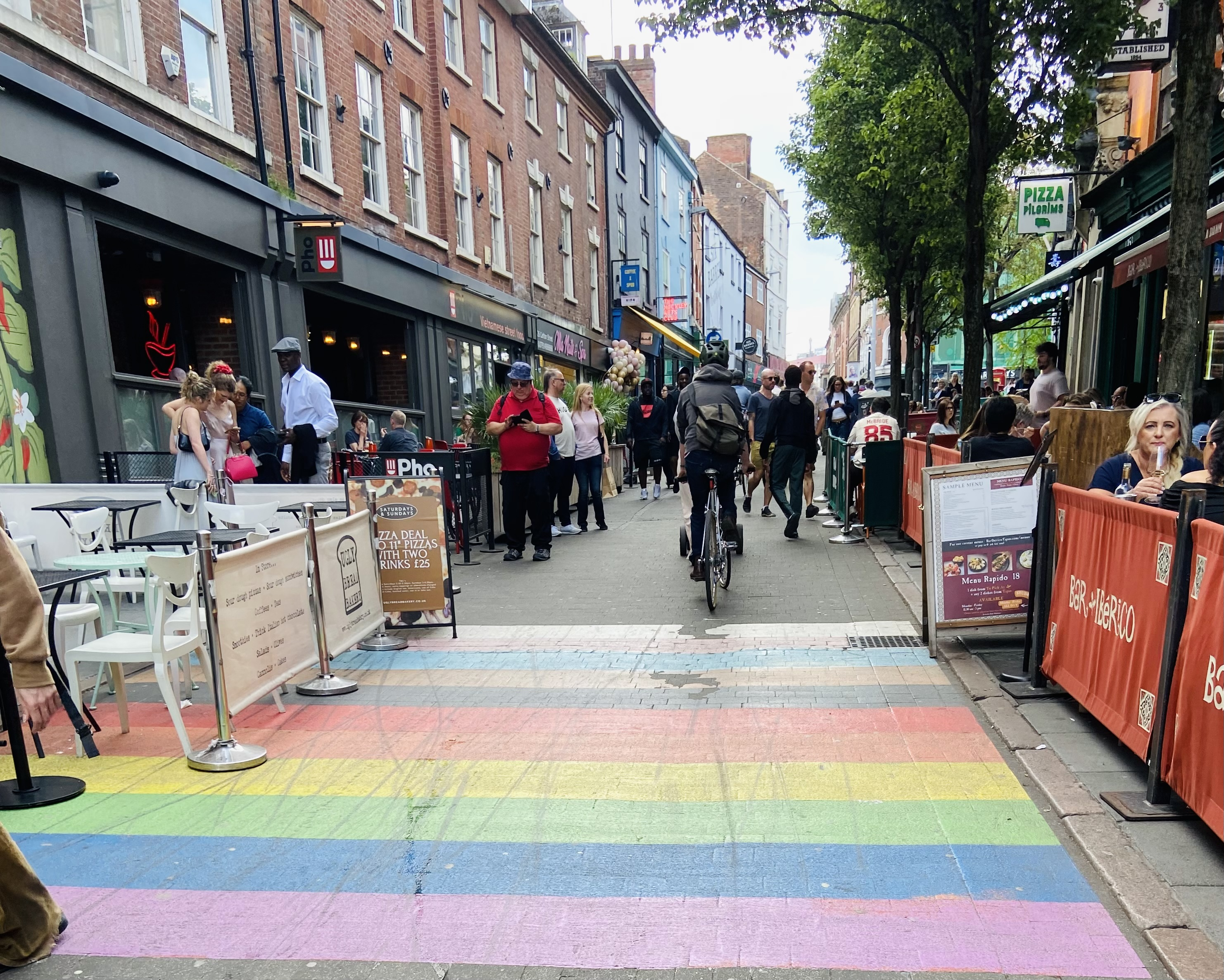
Hockley

== See also ==
- Creative Quarter, Nottingham
