= Arkwright Building =

Grade II* listed university building in Nottingham, England

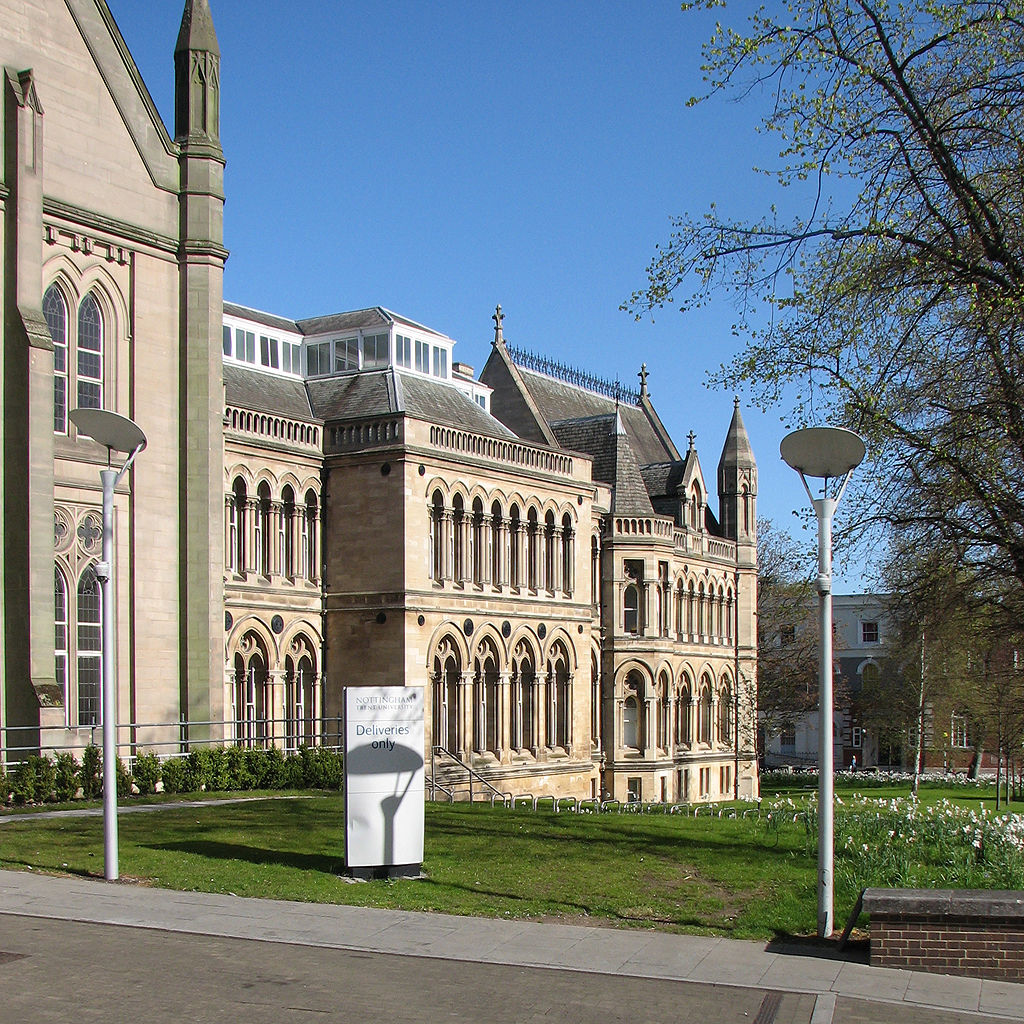
- From the front of the building
- Interactive map of the Arkwright Building area

General information
- Architectural style: Gothic Revival
- Location: Shakespeare Street; Nottingham, England
- Coordinates: 52°57′26″N 1°9′8″W
- Current tenants: Nottingham Trent University
- Construction started: 1877
- Completed: 1881
- Owner: Nottingham Trent University

Design and construction
- Designations: Grade II* listed building

Website
- www.ntu.ac.uk/study-and-courses/courses/our-facilities/newton-arkwright

The Arkwright Building is a Grade II* listed university building on Shakespeare Street in Nottingham, England. It forms part of the Nottingham Trent University City Campus and is one of the university's principal historic buildings.

Built between 1877 and 1881, the building was originally home to University College Nottingham, the city library and a natural history museum. It is regarded by Historic England as one of Nottingham’s most significant nineteenth-century public buildings and a notable example of later Victorian Gothic Revival architecture.

== History ==
The Arkwright Building was constructed between 1877 and 1881 as part of a municipal scheme to expand educational and cultural provision in central Nottingham. It housed University College Nottingham, Nottingham’s public library, and a natural history museum.

The building was described at the time as the “finest pile of public buildings in Nottinghamshire”. It later formed part of the educational lineage of both the University of Nottingham and Nottingham Trent University, passing through the institutional histories of University College Nottingham, the Nottingham and District Technical College, and Trent Polytechnic before becoming part of NTU.

The Arkwright Building is also associated with D. H. Lawrence, who studied there during his teacher-training years, and with the chemist Frederic Stanley Kipping, whose work in the building contributed to the development of silicone polymers.

== Architecture and heritage ==
The Arkwright Building was designed in an elaborate Gothic Revival style, with gables, arches and pinnacles. Historic England describes it as a “very fine and elaborate example” of later nineteenth-century architecture and considers it the most prominent and architecturally important public building constructed in Nottingham by the Corporation in the nineteenth century.

The building was first listed at Grade II* on 12 July 1972. Although part of the structure was affected by bomb damage during the Second World War, Historic England notes that the building remains highly significant both externally and internally, with a substantial number of important original spaces and features surviving.

== Redevelopment ==
In the 2000s, the Arkwright Building was extensively refurbished together with the neighbouring Newton Building as part of Nottingham Trent University’s £90 million regeneration of its City Campus. The project created a new central court and link structure between the two Grade II* listed buildings, adding new teaching, social and support spaces while preserving significant historic fabric.

The redevelopment, completed in 2009, received several architectural awards, including a RIBA Regional Award, a Civic Trust Award, a Brick Award for refurbishment and renovation, and a Concrete Society Award. Architectural commentary on the project emphasised its role in creating a new social and academic centre for the city campus while securing the long-term future of both historic buildings.

== Present use ==
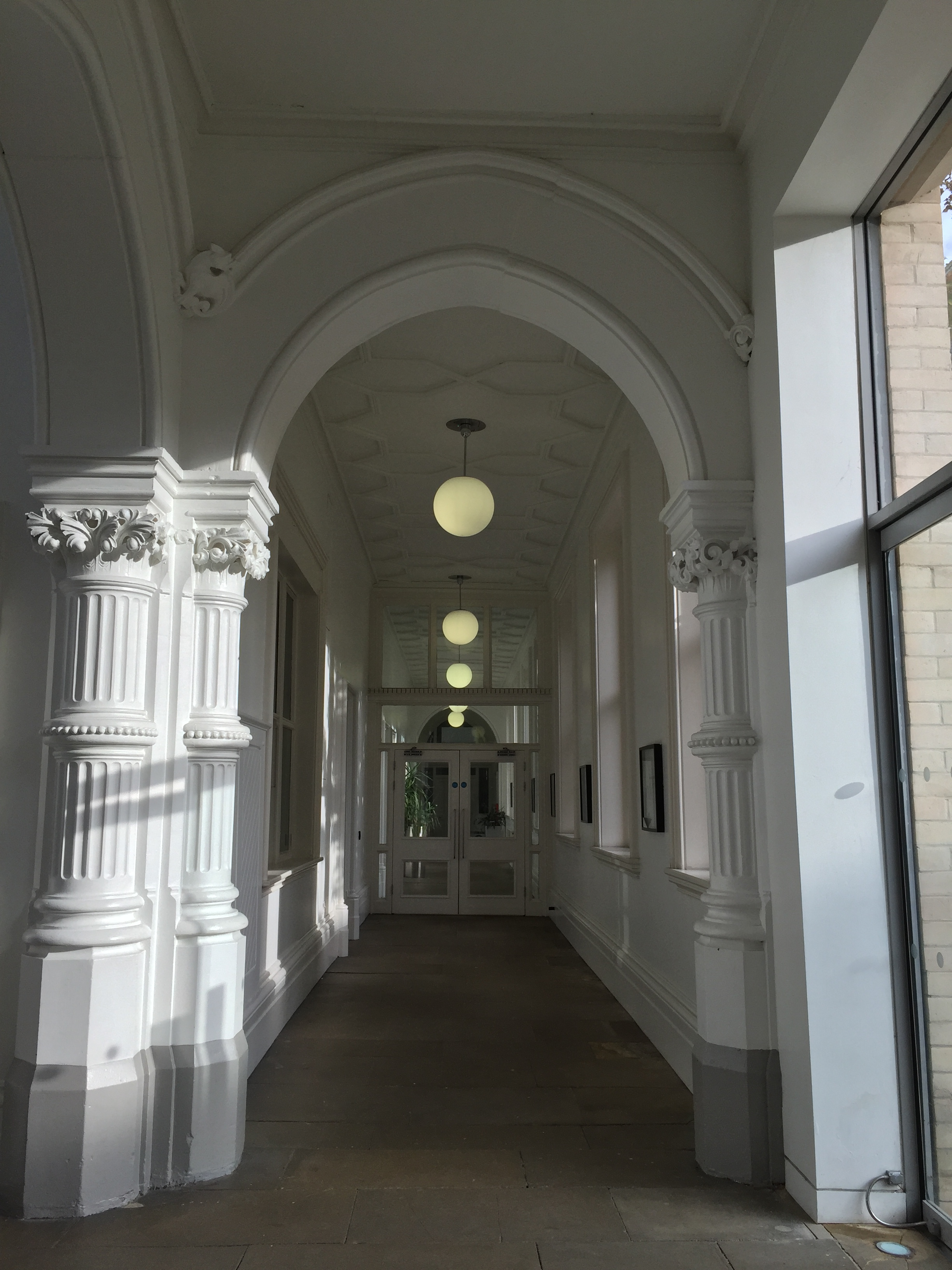
The interior of the Arkwright Building

The Arkwright Building remains in use as part of Nottingham Trent University’s City Campus. Together with the adjoining Newton Building, it accommodates teaching spaces, social areas, student services and events facilities at the centre of the university’s city-centre estate.

== See also ==
- Nottingham Trent University
- D. H. Lawrence
