= NSR =

NSR can refer to:

== Politics and government ==
- Federation of Northern Syria – Rojava
- National Security Review (1989–1993), a US national security directive
- Naval Service Reserve, Ireland
- Norwegian Sámi Association (Norwegian: Norgga Sámiid Riikasearvi)
- Neelam Sanjiva Reddy, (1913–1996), former president of India

== Transportation and vehicles ==
- Airbus NSR, a passenger aircraft
- Honda NSR series of motorcycles
- Naval Ship Rules, short title of Lloyd's Register's Rules and Regulations for the Classification of Naval Ships
- Nizam's State Railway, a former transport company in Hyderabad State
- North Staffordshire Railway
- Northern Sea Route, a shipping route along the Arctic coast of Siberia, from Kara Sea to Bering Strait
- Nova Scotia Railway

== Sports and recreation ==
- NASCAR SimRacing, a computer game
- National Schools' Regatta, a rowing regatta in Great Britain
- National Student Rodeo, a kayak sporting event
- No Straight Roads, an action-adventure video game
- Northside Rollers, an Australian roller derby league

== Other ==
- NATO Submarine Rescue System
- Net smelter return, a mining business term
- Normal sinus rhythm, of the heart
- North Sea Region
- Notch tensile strength of a material
