= Nottingham bus station =

Nottingham bus station may refer to:

- Broadmarsh bus station
- Nottingham Victoria bus station
