= Holme Pierrepont National Watersports Centre =

Sports venue near Nottingham, England

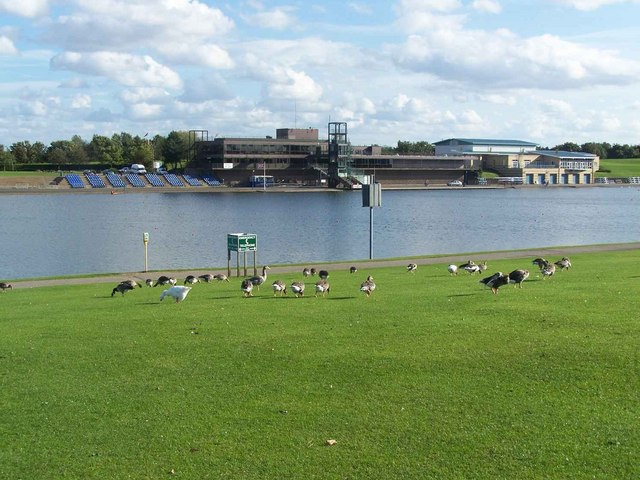
- The Sports Centre
- Interactive map of Holme Pierrepont National Watersports Centre
- Address: Adbolton Lane, Holme Pierrepont, Nottingham, NG12 2LU; England
- Location: Rushcliffe, Nottinghamshire
- Coordinates: 52.9458°N 1.0903°W
- Owner: Nottinghamshire County Council
- Operator: Serco

Construction
- Opened: 1971

Website
- http://www.nwscnotts.com/

Holme Pierrepont Country Park, home of The National Water Sports Centre is located in the hamlet of Holme Pierrepont near Nottingham, England and on the River Trent. It is used for many different sports and has received investment which has enabled a major refurbishment of existing facilities as well as introduction of new facilities.

Run by Serco on behalf of Nottinghamshire County Council, it was previously one of five National Sports Centres.

== History ==
The centre was constructed during 1970 and 1971 on a former gravel works and required the excavation of one and a half million cubic yards of material. The centre opened in 1971 and won second prize in the 1972 Times/RICS Conservation Awards and was consequently chosen to host the first National Rowing Championships in 1972.

Until 2009 the centre was operated on behalf of Sport England however control was returned to Nottinghamshire County Council due to priority changes around the 2012 Summer Olympics. In 2013 a new management team from Serco Leisure was put in place, on a 21 year contract with an obligation to maintain and upgrade the site's facilities.

== Facilities ==
Set in 270 acres (1.1 km^{2}) of parkland, Holme Pierrepont Country Park offers water and land based activities. The centre is made up of three pieces of water:

- Regatta lake, a 2,000 metre regatta rowing facility which features either a six lane rowing course or a nine lane Sprint Kayak course,
- A 700 m white water canoe slalom course,
- An open water swimming and Canoe polo lagoon. This used to be the site of a wakeboard cabletow, however this suffered neglect and eventually collapsed into the lake and was removed.

=== Outdoor Adventure Park ===
The Outdoor Adventure Park was formerly known as the Family Fun Park. Opened in 2014, it is located in the Country Park area of the site. It includes:

- Sky Trail High Ropes course
- Mini golf
- Children's play area
- Country Park café

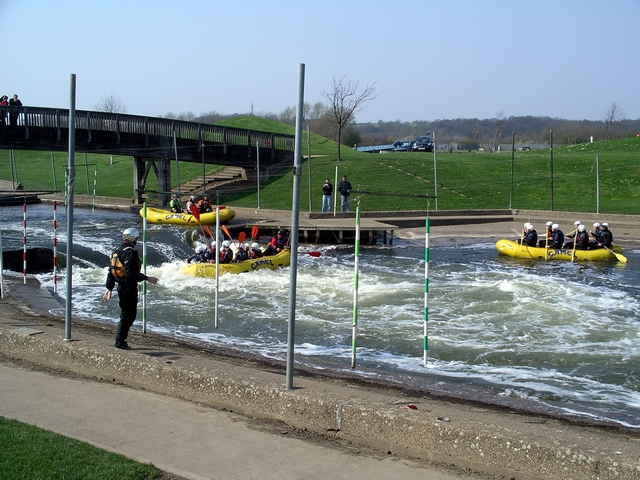
Rafting at the National Watersports Centre

=== Skytrail and Sky Tykes ===
The Skytrail is a high ropes course that allows participants to challenge themselves to cross obstacles on two levels without needing to be detached at any point. Sky Tykes is a miniature version for smaller children.

=== Mini golf ===
Beneath the Skytrail is a 9-hole mini golf course that increases in difficulty with each hole.

=== Gym ===
There are two gyms which were opened in 2014 - these include a 60 station Life Fitness gym which overlooks the Regatta Lake and a Strength and Conditioning gym. Equipment includes:

- The New Life Fitness Discovery Range
- Resistance equipment
- Power plate
- Life Fitness
- Training Bikes
- Kayak simulator
- Squat rack
- Two lifting platforms
- Free weights
- Benches
- Assisted chin dip

=== Accommodation ===
The site has 54 refurbished en-suite bedrooms in the main Lakeside building, as well as a self-contained cottage called The Elms, which sleeps up to 11 people. The site also has an 18-acre campsite containing a mixture of grass and hard standing pitches, some available with electric hook up, 5 tipis (introduced in 2016) and 10 camping arches (insulated wooden huts for camping in).

=== Conferencing facilities ===
The centre offers conference and meeting facilities and has four refurbished conference rooms, with the largest room catering for up to 150 people.

Holme Pierrepont Country Park offers team building activities alongside their conferencing packages.

A sports science and medicine centre, ran by the English Institute of Sport, is available for use by governing bodies for physiology, sports injury/rehabilitation and physiological testing.

=== Whitewater course ===
The course is a focal point for English whitewater rafting and kayaking, holding international events for slalom, freestyle and wild water racing. One hosted event is the National Student Rodeo, the largest freestyle kayaking event in the world. During this event the Centre received coverage in local news, and publications such as Canoe & Kayak UK magazine.

=== Location ===
The whitewater course is located between the weir on the canalised River Trent and the regatta lake.

=== Construction ===
Built in 1986, the course is made primarily from concrete. It is approximately 700 metres long, and drops just over 4 metres in height to produce Grade 3 whitewater rapids. The course is gravity fed, does not use electricity to power it, and therefore is relatively cheap to run.

Due to the nature of the design, swimming through the course is safer than many other locations around the UK due to deep channels and few significant underwater obstructions.

The amount of water flowing through the course depends on rainfall, and canal usage, but due to the large catchment of the Trent, flows between 16 and 25 cubic metres per second are common. As the course is directly connected to the Trent high river levels cause the course to progressively flood from the bottom upwards. The whitewater course is open to the public up to a river level of 2.2m as measured at the Environment Agency Colwick gauging station.

The course was renovated in 2009. Along with maintenance work, some of the original concrete obstacles were removed and Omniflots (large plastic movable blocks) were installed.

== Sports ==
Holme Pierrepont National Watersports Centre is home of British Canoeing, the national governing body for canoeing and kayaking in the UK, whose headquarters are at the site.

The Holme Pierrepont Canoe Club gives lessons on the flat water lake and the course, which is also used for water safety and water rescue training. It also hosts rafting, playboating, slalom; kayaking plus squirt boaters, open boat canoeists and wild water racing. It was also a venue for circuit powerboat racing, having held many world and European championships.

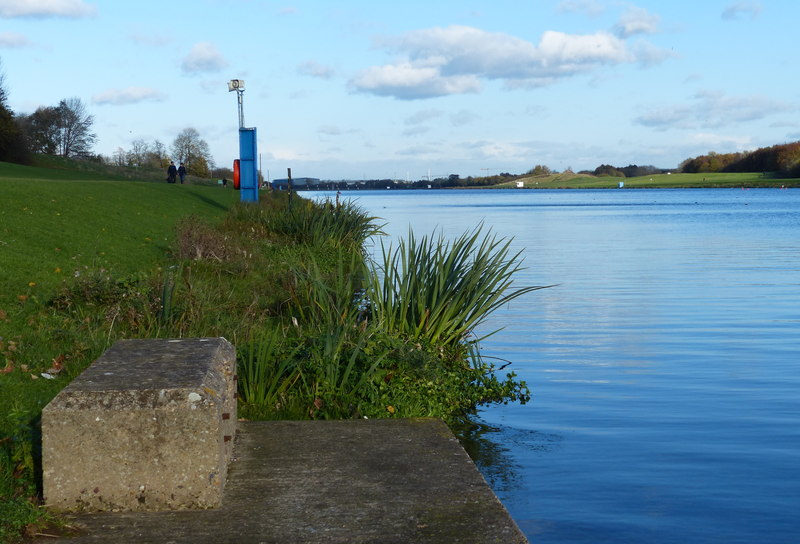
Regatta Lake

One of the main sports held at the centre is rowing, using the 2000 metre multi-lane rowing lake. The centre was the venue for the World Rowing Junior Championships in 1973, and for the World Rowing Championships in 1975 and 1986, and many competitions for UK rowing. The safety is outsourced to local lifeguard unit Colwick Park Lifeguards who have been part of the team at Holme Pierrepont since 1979.

The centre is the venue for running and triathlon events, using the lake, internal tracks and easy access to local roads

The centre is the base for the Holme Pierrepont Running Club.

The centre was chosen to host the Sea Scout 100 national Sea Scout Centenary Jamboree in August 2009. Over 3000 Sea Scouts attended including the USA and New Zealand.

== See also ==
- Lee Valley White Water Centre
- Cardiff International White Water
- Cardington Artificial Slalom Course
- Nene Whitewater Centre
- Tees Barrage International White Water Course
