= Transport in Nottingham =

Overview of the transport network of Nottingham, England

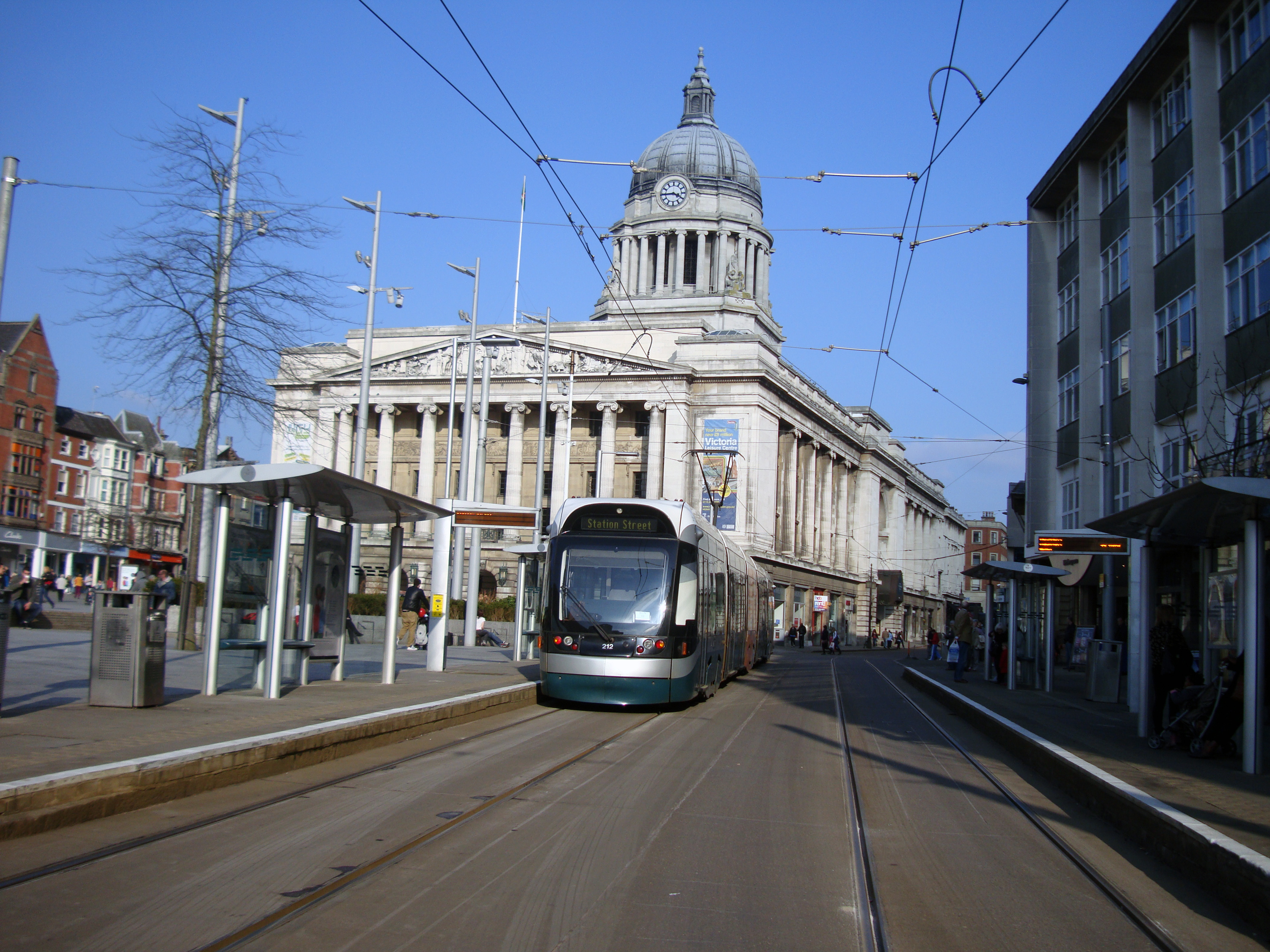
A Nottingham Express Transit tram in Old Market Square

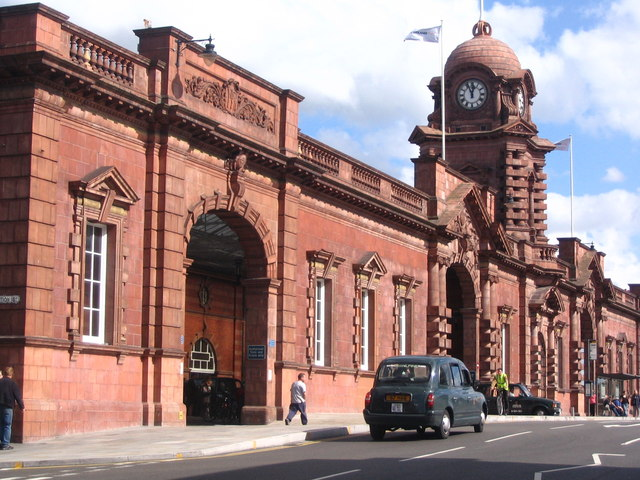
Nottingham station

Nottingham is the seventh largest conurbation in the United Kingdom; despite this, the city's transport system was deemed to be poor for its size in the 1980s. In the early 21st century, the UK Government invested heavily in the transport network of Nottingham, which has led to the reopening of the Robin Hood Line and the construction of a light rail system, Nottingham Express Transit.

== Railway ==
=== History ===
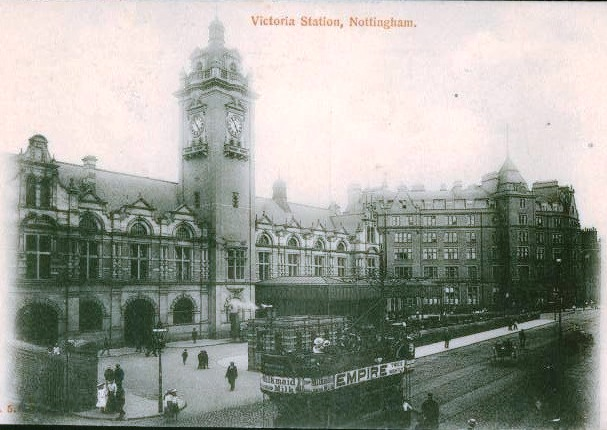
Nottingham Victoria station in the early 1900s

The first railway station in Nottingham was built on Carrington Street and was opened in 1839 by the Midland Counties Railway; it was served by trains to Derby. By 1848, the station was too small for what was needed and a new through station was built by the Midland Railway (which was formed when the Midland Counties Railway merged with two other companies). New destinations, such as Lincoln, received a direct service to Nottingham.

In 1900, the Manchester, Sheffield and Lincolnshire Railway opened Nottingham Victoria station, as part of the new line to London which it was building. It was served by Great Central services to London Marylebone and also used by the Great Northern Railway.

In 1904, the Midland Railway closed their station in Nottingham and opened a new one, Nottingham Midland station, which is still open today.

By 1967, Nottingham Victoria station had become run down; both the station, and passenger numbers on the routes through it, suffered from low demand. The station and the Great Central Main Line were closed; Nottingham Arkwright Street, on the same line, closed in 1969.

The Robin Hood Line from Nottingham to Mansfield and Worksop was closed to passengers, following the Beeching cuts in the 1960s; it was reopened to passengers in stages between 1993 and 1998.

=== Current services ===
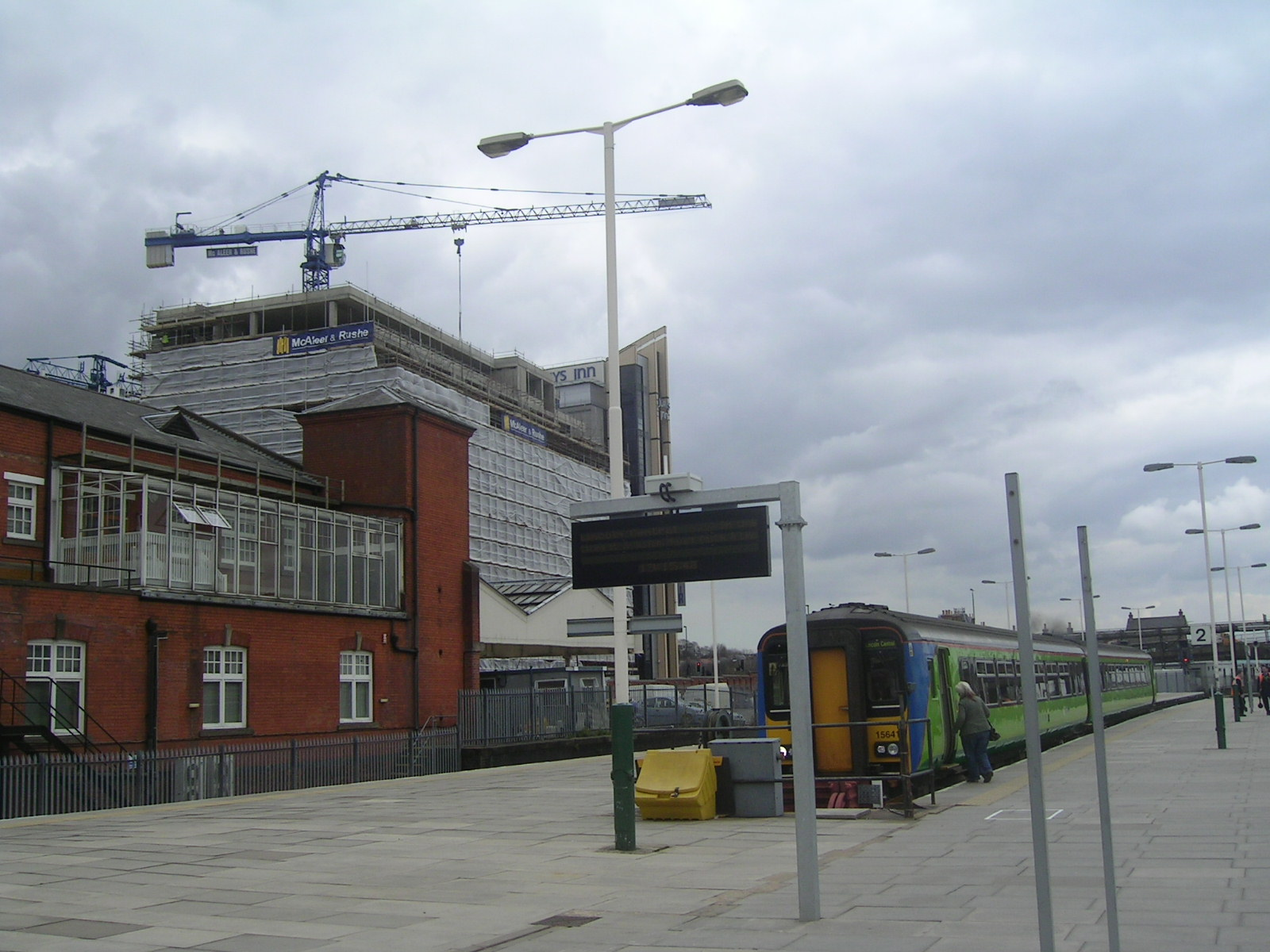
Nottingham Midland station

Today, the station is served by three train operating companies:

- East Midlands Railway provides inter-city services to London St Pancras, via East Midlands Parkway, Loughborough and Leicester; trains on this route operate twice every hour. There are also regular services between Norwich and Liverpool Lime Street; between Newark Castle, Derby and Crewe; between Leicester and Lincoln; to Skegness; and to Matlock.
- CrossCountry operates hourly services to Birmingham New Street and Cardiff Central.
- Northern Trains provides hourly services to Leeds, via Sheffield.

=== Former HS2 plans ===
There were plans to bring High Speed 2 rail services to Nottingham and the East Midlands, by constructing a parkway station, East Midlands Hub, at nearby Toton.

Plans for the leg of the line between Birmingham Curzon Street and Leeds have now been scrapped.

== Trams ==
=== History ===
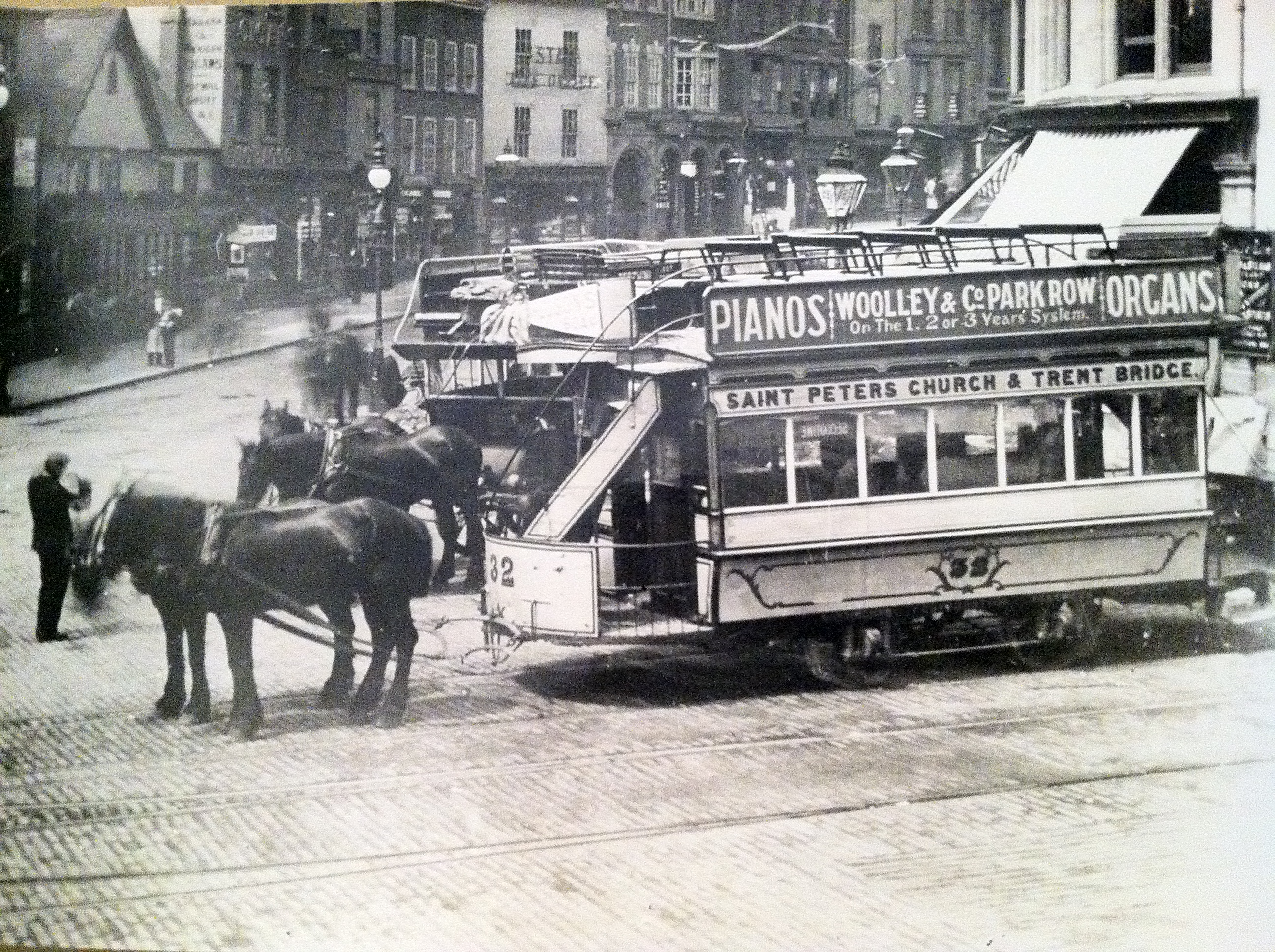
Horse tram outside St Peter's Church (ca.1890)

The Nottingham and District Tramways Company Limited began operating horse-drawn trams in the city in 1878. A steam tram service began in 1880. In 1898, the Nottingham Corporation Tramways took over the existing tramways. Electric trams were introduced from 1901 and the last horse tram ran in 1902. The tram network in Nottingham was replaced between 1926 and 1936 by a combination of the Nottingham trolleybus system and a fleet of motor buses.

=== Nottingham Express Transit ===
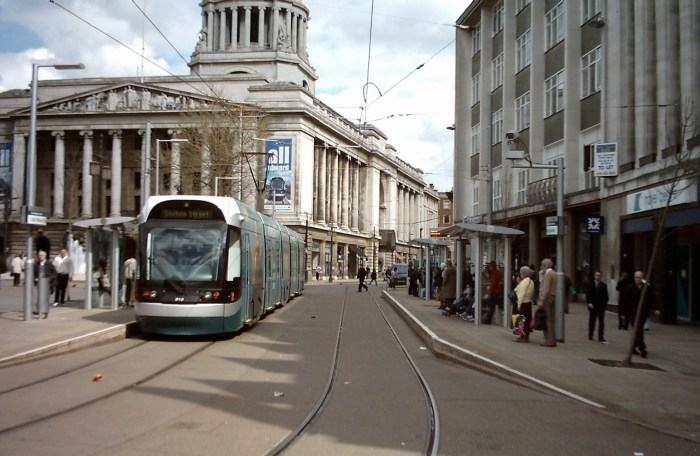
A tram at the Old Market Square stop, in the centre of the city

Nottingham Express Transit (NET) is a light-rail system. The first line opened on 9 March 2004, having cost £167 million to construct. The scheme took 16 years from conception to implementation.

There are currently two lines:

- Line 1 between Hucknall and Toton Lane. The northern section runs parallel to the Robin Hood Line
- Line 2 between Phoenix Park to Clifton South.

== Buses ==
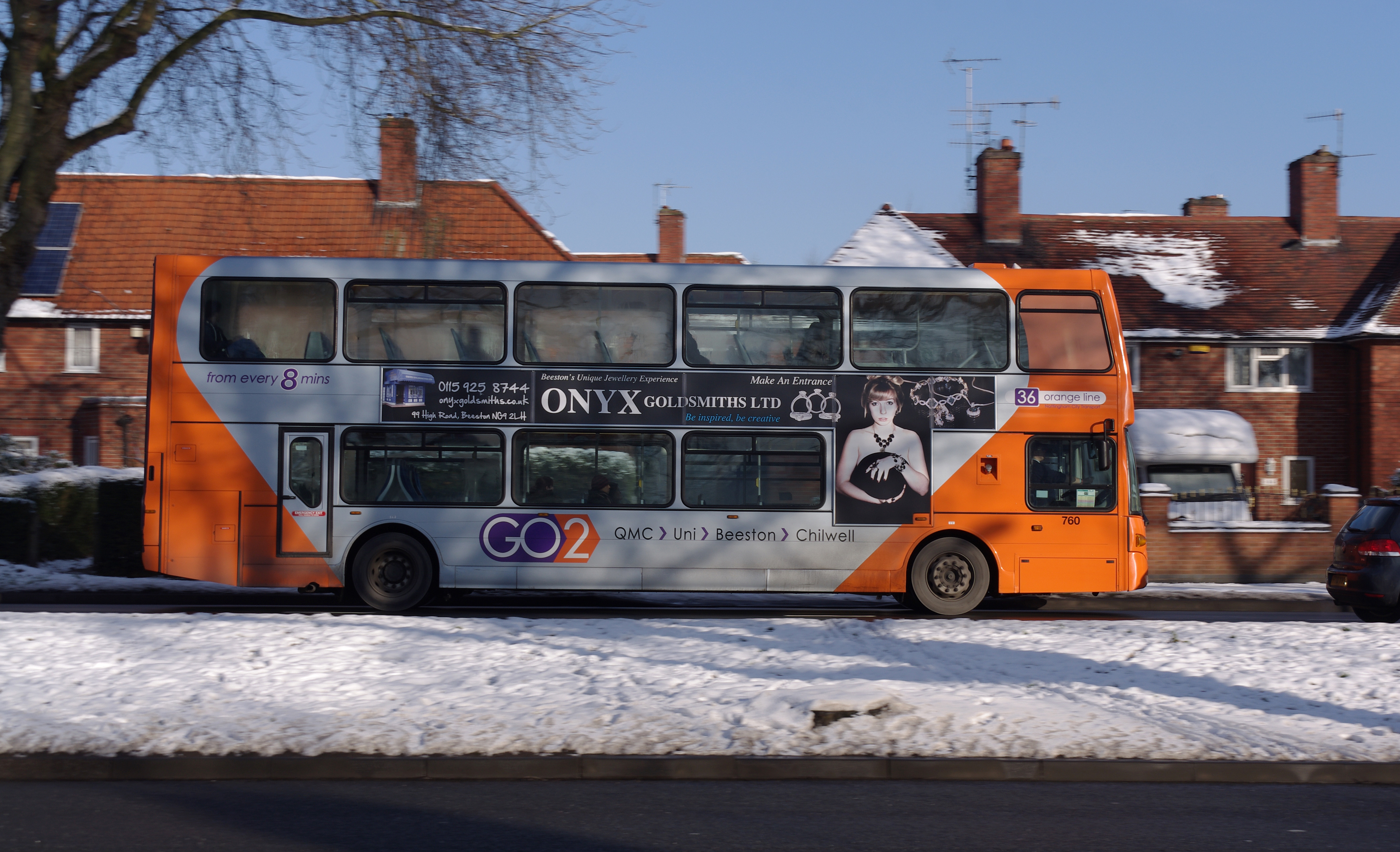
A Nottingham City Transport bus in Chilwell

=== Operators ===
Nottingham City Transport (NCT) operates the majority of bus services in the city. It was the first transport operator in the UK to use RFID technology for its EasyRider bus passes, introduced in 2000.

Trent Barton operate some local services around Nottingham and to other nearby towns such as Beeston, Mansfield and Derby.

The two operators are also frequent winners of the National Bus Operator of the Year award. NCT and Trent Barton have a good relationship and routes are designed so that they are not competing against each other.

=== Ticketing ===
All operators issue single journey tickets and day tickets which can be used on all the services that operator runs. The Robin Hood day ticket allows travel on any bus, tram or local train service within the Nottingham area.

=== Bus stations ===
There are two bus stations in the city centre: Broadmarsh and Victoria.

- Broadmarsh bus station is situated in the city centre, adjacent to the former Broadmarsh Shopping Centre, underneath its multi-storey car park. It is bordered by Canal Street (A6008 road) and is close to Nottingham railway and tram stations. Services that call here are operated predominantly by Trent Barton, with routes to Keyworth, Radcliffe-on-Trent, Cotgrave, Kegworth, Coalville and East Midlands Airport.

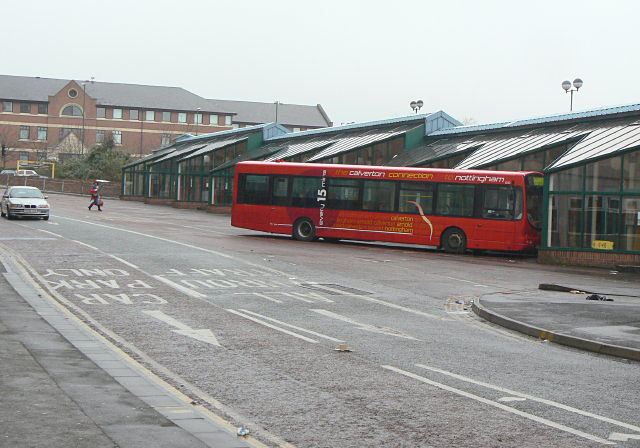
Victoria bus station

- Victoria bus station is sited within the Victoria Centre, at the northern edge of the city centre. Trent Barton manages the bus station's travel shop and operates routes to Queen's Medical Centre, Derby, Hucknall and Mansfield. Stagecoach East Midlands provides routes to Sherwood Forest, Mansfield and Chesterfield. Nottingham City Transport's routes call at nearby stops on Milton Street.

== Roads ==
Nottingham is close to the M1 motorway and major roads the A52 and the A46. From the west of Nottingham through to Derby, the A52 is known as Brian Clough Way. There are several park and ride locations, which offer connections with Nottingham Express Transit or the bus network.

=== Workplace parking levy ===
In April 2012, Nottingham became the first city in the UK to introduce a workplace parking levy. The levy charges businesses for each parking space made available to employees at businesses with more than ten such parking spaces. The council have used the revenue of around £10 million per year to develop the city's tram system. The levy for the period 1 April 2020 – 31 March 2021 is £424 per space. As of 2019, there was a 9% reduction in car traffic and 15% increase in public transport use since the introduction of the levy.

== Cycling ==
Nottingham benefits from a network of traffic free cycle routes; these include:

- The Derby-Sheffield section of Route 6 of the National Cycle Network passes by University of Nottingham and Queen's Medical Centre, continuing on through Wollaton and Bulwell
- Route 15 of the National Cycle Network from Nottingham to Sleaford starts from Trent Bridge and passes by Holme Pierrepont National Watersports Centre, continuing on through Radcliffe-on-Trent and Bingham
- The Big Track is a circular cycle route which follows the tow paths of the River Trent, Beeston Canal and Nottingham Canal.

National Cycle Routes passing through the city are maintained by volunteers from Sustrans. Cyclists in the Nottingham area are represented by Pedals (The Nottingham Cycling Campaign).

A new cycle and pedestrian bridge is being built over the River Trent to connect cycling routes on each side of the river.

=== Scooter hire ===
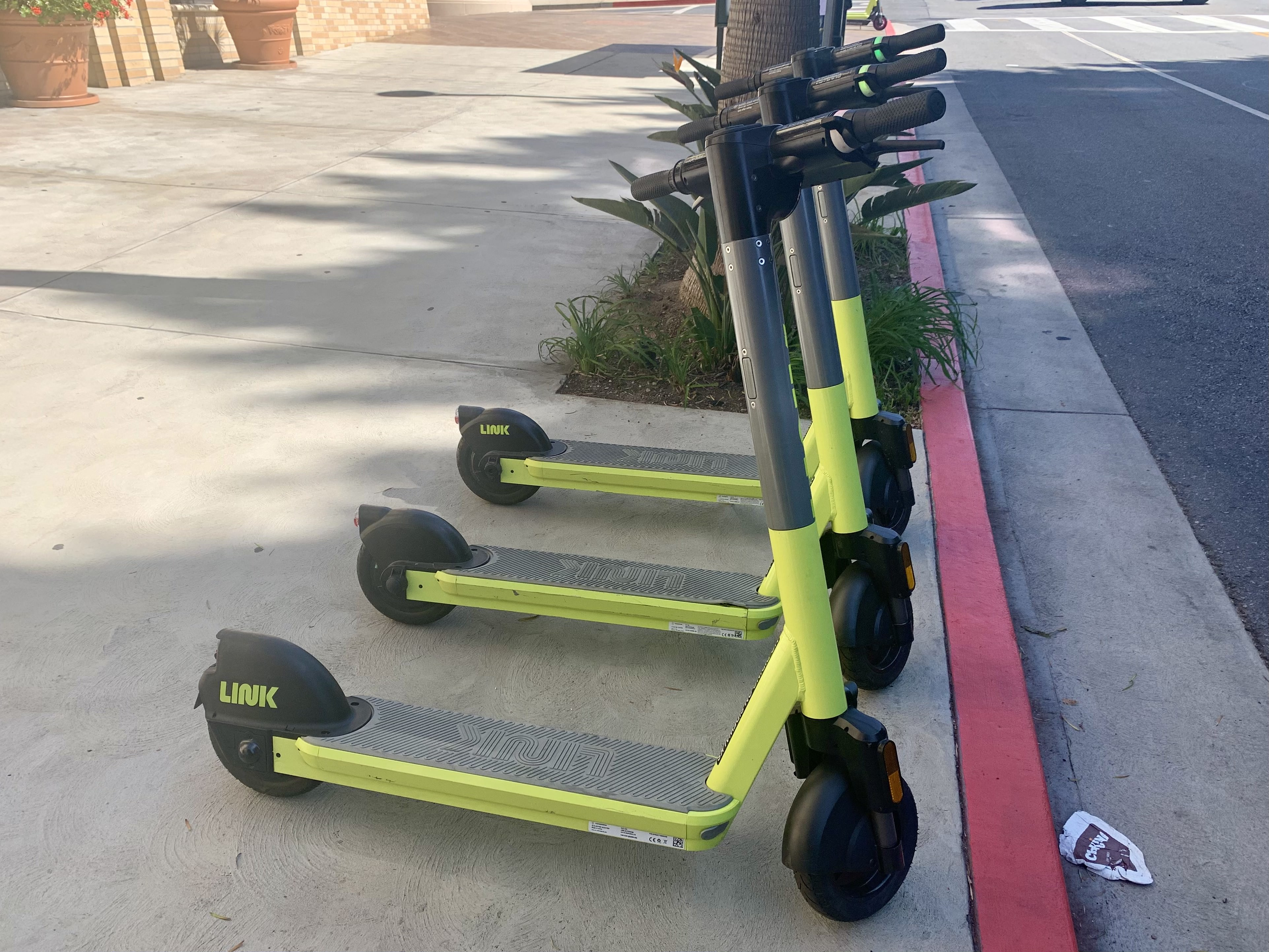
Scooters for hire in Los Angeles, U.S.

Nottingham was one of several trial locations arranged by the Department for Transport to facilitate local journeys by electric scooters. Started in October 2020 together with Derby City Council, the trial was extended in December 2023 until 2026. Riders must be at least 18 years of age, hold a full provisional driving licence, must ride on roads and bus lanes only, not pedestrian footways, and pay by a phone app.

In late December 2023, the partner business, US-based Superpedestrian, planned to cease trading by 31 December and the scooters were withdrawn from their city centre locations. Nottingham City Council are seeking a new provider to continue the scheme.

== Air ==
East Midlands Airport, in Leicestershire, is served by low-cost international airlines, makes the city easily accessible from other parts of the world providing daily services to many principal European destinations such as Paris, Milan, Frankfurt, Berlin, Oslo and Amsterdam; internal flights to Edinburgh and Belfast; and limited services to transcontinental destinations such as Barbados, Mexico and Florida.

Birmingham Airport is about an hour away and provides flights to most principal European cities, New York, Boston, Toronto, Montreal, Dubai and locations in India.

== Taxis ==
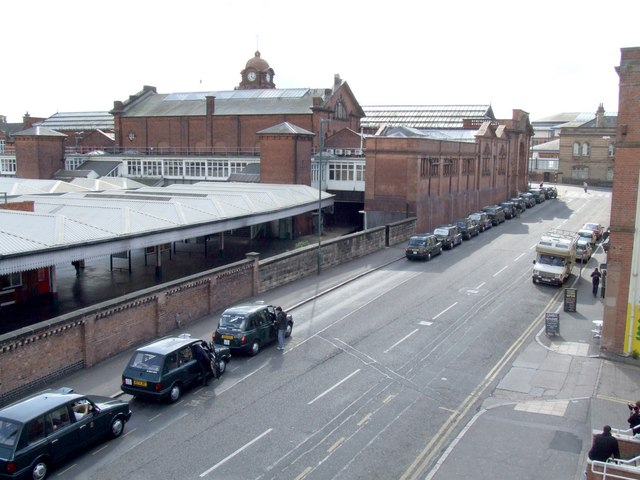
Taxis outside Nottingham station

The city has a large number of licensed taxi companies operating. There are also dark green London-style Hackney Carriage taxis, which can be hailed on the street.

There are several designated taxi ranks in the city centre, including at Nottingham station, Wheeler Gate, the Victoria Centre, Broadmarsh bus station and The Corner House.

Jim Mortell, of Taxi Licensing at Nottingham City Council, said "The city council has a team of uniformed late-night enforcement officers and non-uniformed enforcement officers working to detect any instances of drivers plying for hire illegally. This includes private hire drivers picking up passengers who have not pre-booked and any drivers not licensed to work within Nottingham City".
