= City of Caves =

Caves attraction in Nottingham, England

Coordinates: 52.9510°N 1.1466°W

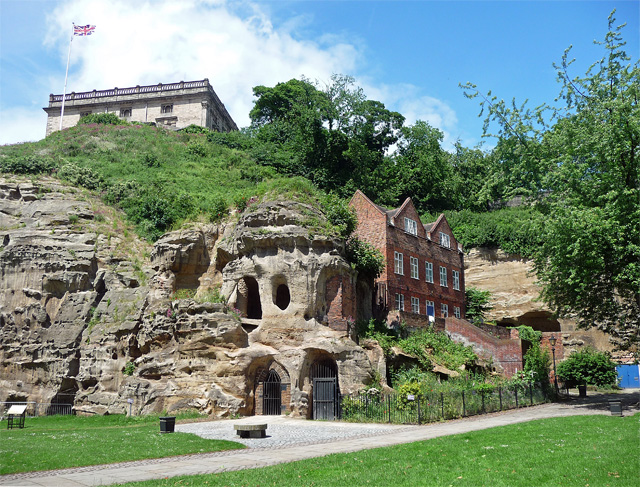
- Established: 2004; 22 years ago
- Location: Garner's Hill, Nottingham, NG1 1HF, England
- Website: www.nationaljusticemuseum.org.uk/cityofcaves

Scheduled monument
- Official name: Nottingham Caves
- Reference no.: 1006377

City of Caves is a visitor attraction in Nottingham based on a network of caves, carved out of sandstone that have been variously used over the years as a tannery, public house cellars, and as an air raid shelter. The nearby Drury Hill is the medieval street under which they were formerly located until it was demolished to make way for the Broadmarsh shopping centre. The newer City of Caves name refers to the fact that the city of Nottingham has hundreds of man-made caves, which have been in use for over a thousand years.

The City of Caves was accessed from the upper level of the Broadmarsh Shopping Centre but can currently be accessed from Garner's Hill due to construction works in the Broadmarsh Centre. The attraction, part of the National Justice Museum, has been run by the Egalitarian Trust since opening in 2004.

== History ==
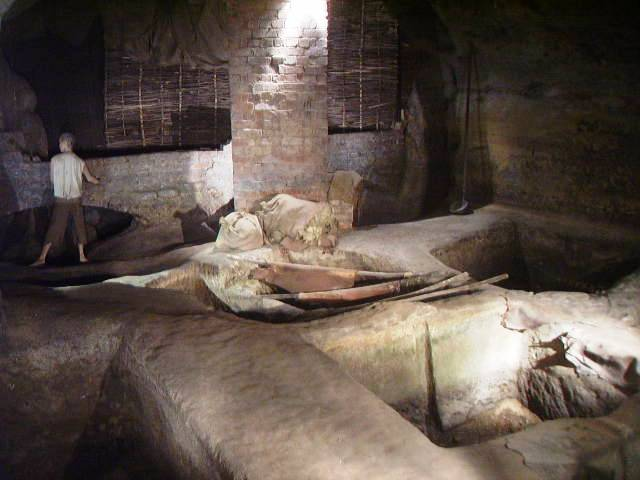
A medieval tannery

Nottingham sits upon a soft sandstone ridge which can easily be dug with simple hand tools to create artificial cave dwellings. Indeed, Nottingham was described as Tig Guocobauc in Old Brythonic meaning 'place of caves' by the Welsh Bishop of Sherborne Asser in his The Life of King Alfred (893). The caves here are some of the oldest remaining in the city, with pottery finds dating some of them to 1270–1300, and were inhabited from at least the 17th century until the St. Mary's Nottingham Inclosure Act 1845 (8 & 9 Vict. c. 7 Pr.) banned the renting of cellars and caves as homes for the poor. None of the caves are natural; they were all cut into the sandstone for use as houses, cellars and places of work by the inhabitants of the city.

If a man is poor he had only to go to Nottingham with a mattock, a shovel, a crow, an iron, a chisel or a mallet, and with such instruments he may play mole and work himself a hole or burrow for his family.

— Anon 1870

As of 2018, more than 800 caves in the city have been catalogued by Nottingham's City Archaeologist, Scott Lomax, including approximately 200 that were only rediscovered, through research by the City Archaeologist, since 2016. Further research by the City Archaeologist increased the number of known caves in the city to 924 as of April 2025. Lomax's research increased the total of known caves to 1000 in May 2026.

Construction of the Broadmarsh Shopping Centre began in the late 1960s, but the opening up of the caves to vandals and plans to fill them in with concrete caused a public outcry. A detailed study by Nottingham City Council, assisted by The Nottingham Historical Arts Society, led to the caves being scheduled as an ancient monument and the development plans were subsequently changed to preserve most of the caves. The caves were cleared by volunteers from the 2418 Sherwood Squadron Air Training Corps and Rushcliffe School and opened to public tours by the Friends of Nottingham Museum in 1978.

== Caves in Nottingham from medieval to now ==
=== Medieval tannery ===
Two caves cut into the cliff face and opening out to daylight housed the only known underground tannery in Britain. The Pillar Cave was originally cut around 1250 but had been filled in by a rockfall by 1400. It was cleared and reopened as part of the tannery in 1500, with circular pits cut to hold barrels. A second cave was also cut with rectangular clay-lined vats. The small size of the vats in these caves indicates that they were probably used for sheep or goats skins rather than cowhide. There was an opening to the River Leen where they would wash the skins in the town's drinking water.

=== Drury Hill slums ===
The basement walls here are all that remains of the buildings of Drury Hill, once a wealthy neighborhood in the medieval city that by the 19th century had degenerated into one of the worst slums in Britain. Poor families slept, ate and lived in the single room basements here with overcrowding and poor sanitation making it a breeding ground for cholera, tuberculosis and smallpox.

=== Air-raid shelter ===
Some of the caves here were joined and expanded to house one of 86 public air raid shelters that were found in the sandstone beneath the city by February 1941 to protect its inhabitants during the bombing attacks of World War II, including a particularly severe one on 8 May 1941 that is recreated as part of the tour. Holes were also dug here to supply the sand used in the sandbags that helped to protect the city.
