= Broadmarsh bus station =

Bus station in Nottingham, England

Broad Marsh bus & coach station
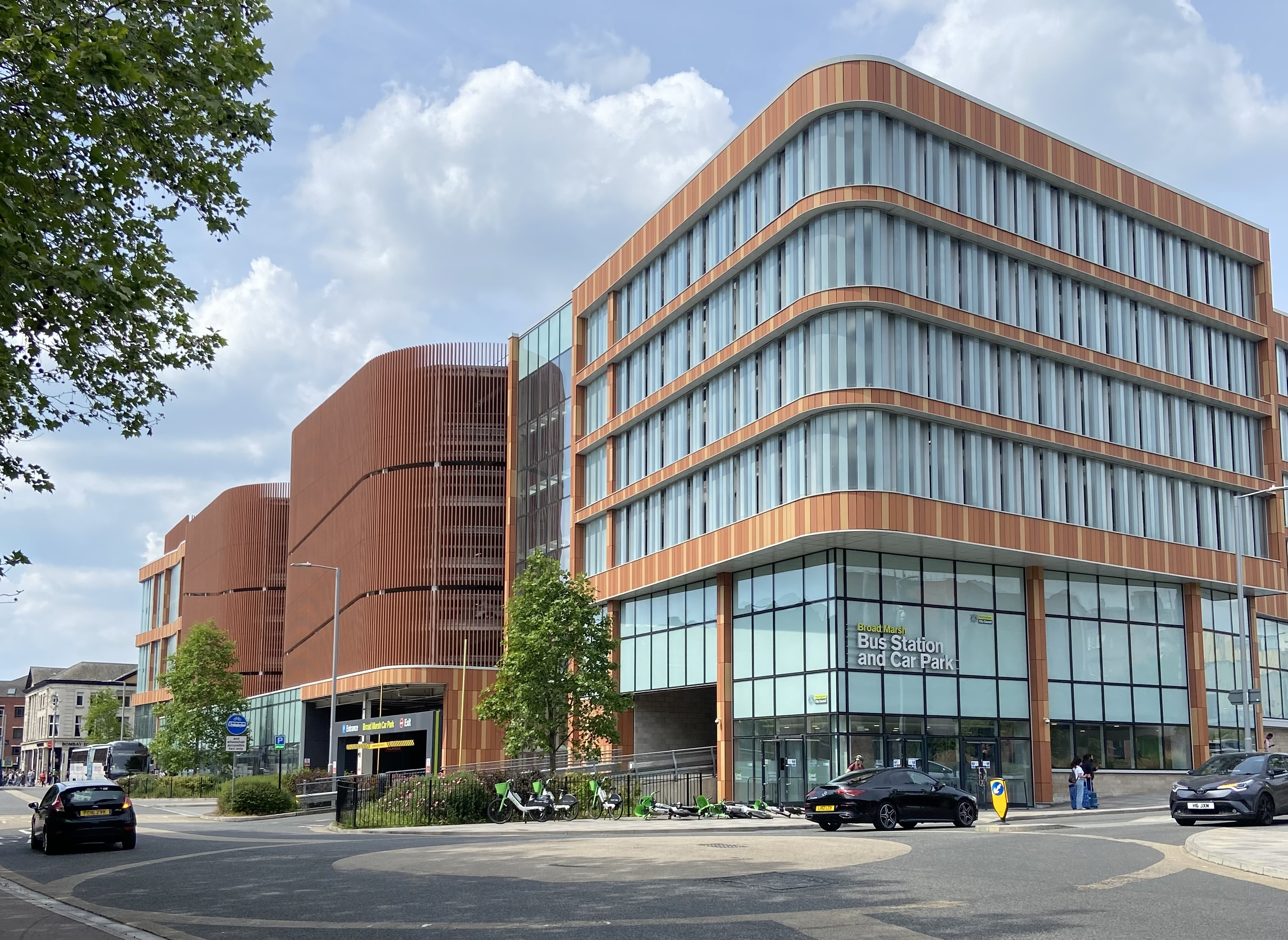
- The bus station from the front

General information
- Location: Nottingham
- Coordinates: 52.9493°N 1.1472°W
- Owner: Nottingham City Council
- Bus stands: 11
- Bus operators: National Express; Trent Barton; Kinchbus
- Connections: Nottingham railway station, 250 metres (270 yd)

Construction
- Parking: Yes

History
- Opened: 14 June 2022 (coaches), 2 October 2022 (buses)
Location
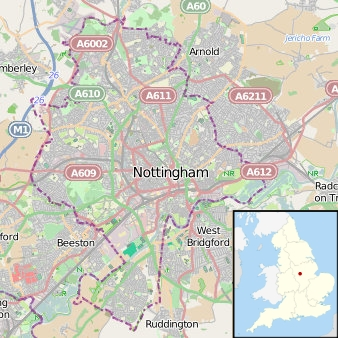
- Location within Greater Nottingham

Broad Marsh bus station, formerly known as Broadmarsh bus station, is a bus station serving the city of Nottingham, England. The station is situated in Nottingham City Centre, underneath a multi-storey car park. It is bordered by Canal Street (A6008 road) and is 250 metres (270 yd) away from Nottingham railway station.

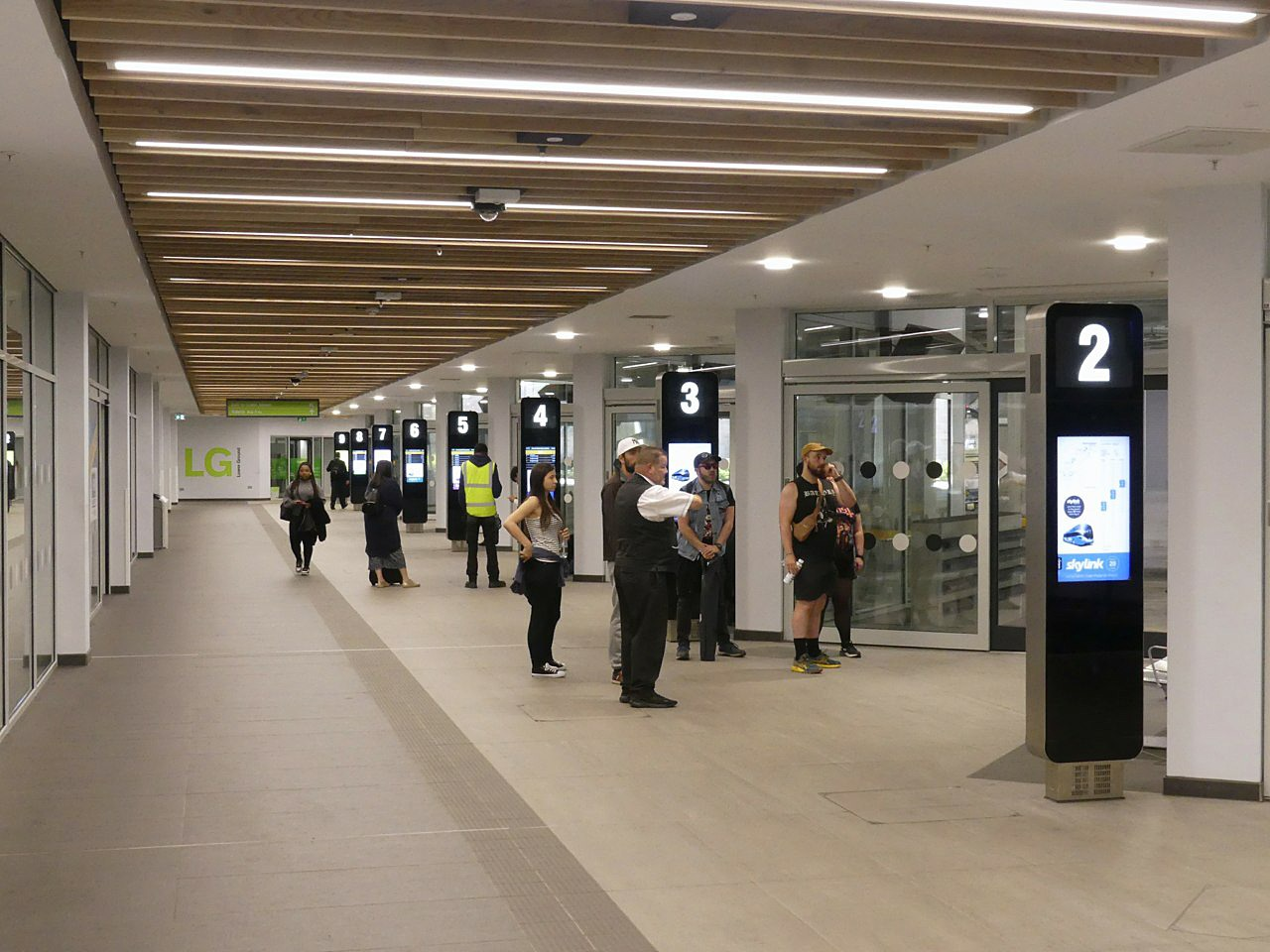
Bus station interior

== Services ==
The station has a total of 11 departure bays, with services operated by Kinchbus (service 9 to Loughborough), Trent Barton and National Express.

National Express services moved from their temporary terminus outside Nottingham Railway Station to Bays 10 and 11 at the new bus station on 14 June 2022, and their new facilities within the bus station were opened on the same date.

The new bus station has been allocated a 10-year lease by Nottingham City Council starting in October 2022.

== History and redevelopment ==
The original Broad Marsh bus station was opened on 1 January 1952 on land cleared as part of the redevelopment of the Broad Marsh area of the city. On 28 December 1951, The Grantham Journal carried an advert stating 'Services to be transferred to Broad Marsh Bus Station'. The bus station took the form of a set of departure stops laid out in a curve, with buses operating in a clockwise direction. That flow was reversed in the April/May of 1959 so that buses operated in an anti-clockwise direction. In April 1969, with the main site earmarked for the development of the new Broadmarsh Shopping Centre, a 'temporary' bus station was built adjoining the railway viaduct. The new design featured parallel departure stops. This 'scrunched' layout continued until 30 October 1971. On 31 October 1971 the new, undercover bus station opened as part of the newly build Broadmarsh Shopping Centre. That layout continued until to 9 July 2017 when it closed as part of a redevelopment of the area. It was adjacent to the former Broad Marsh shopping centre, and had a total of 16 departure bays, including a service by the University of Nottingham Hopper Bus to Sutton Bonington Campus.

A replacement car park and bus station with retail units has been constructed with the new car park opening in November 2021 and is a part of the wider redevelopment of the demolished shopping centre area, including a new central library, named as Southern Gateway. The bus station was intended to open at the same time, but was delayed.

== Gallery ==
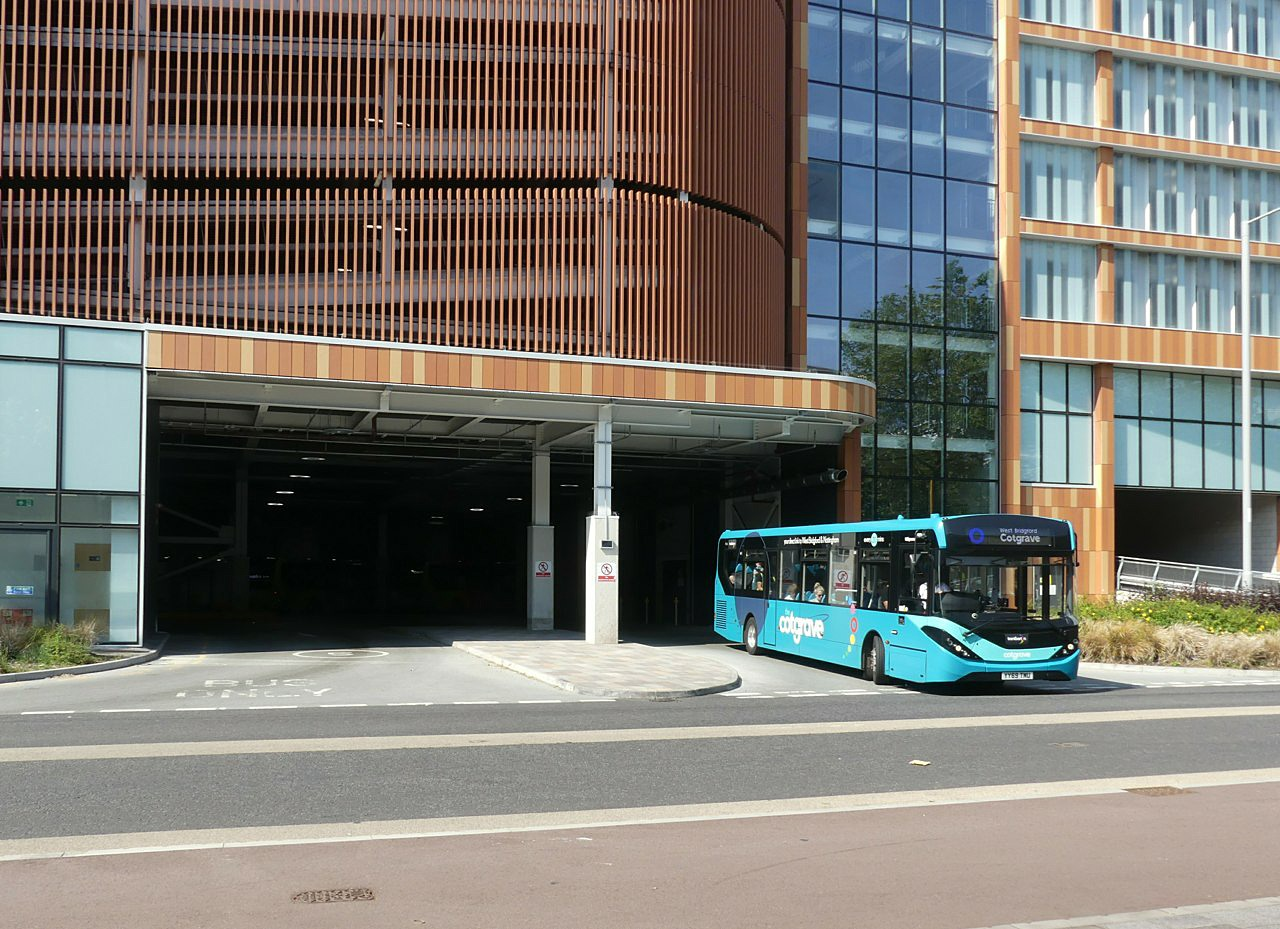
Trentbarton bus departing from the bus station entrance, June 2023

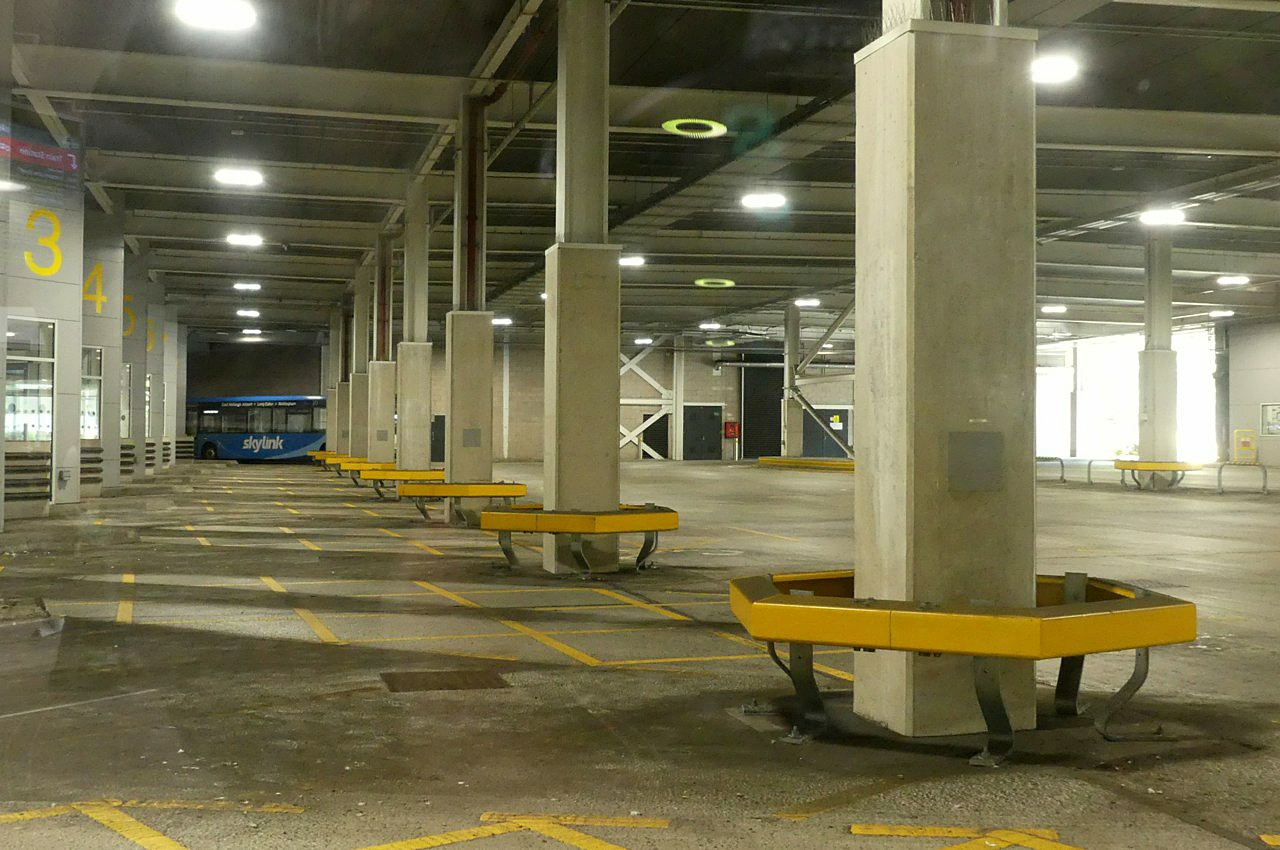
Bays for buses within the station, June 2023

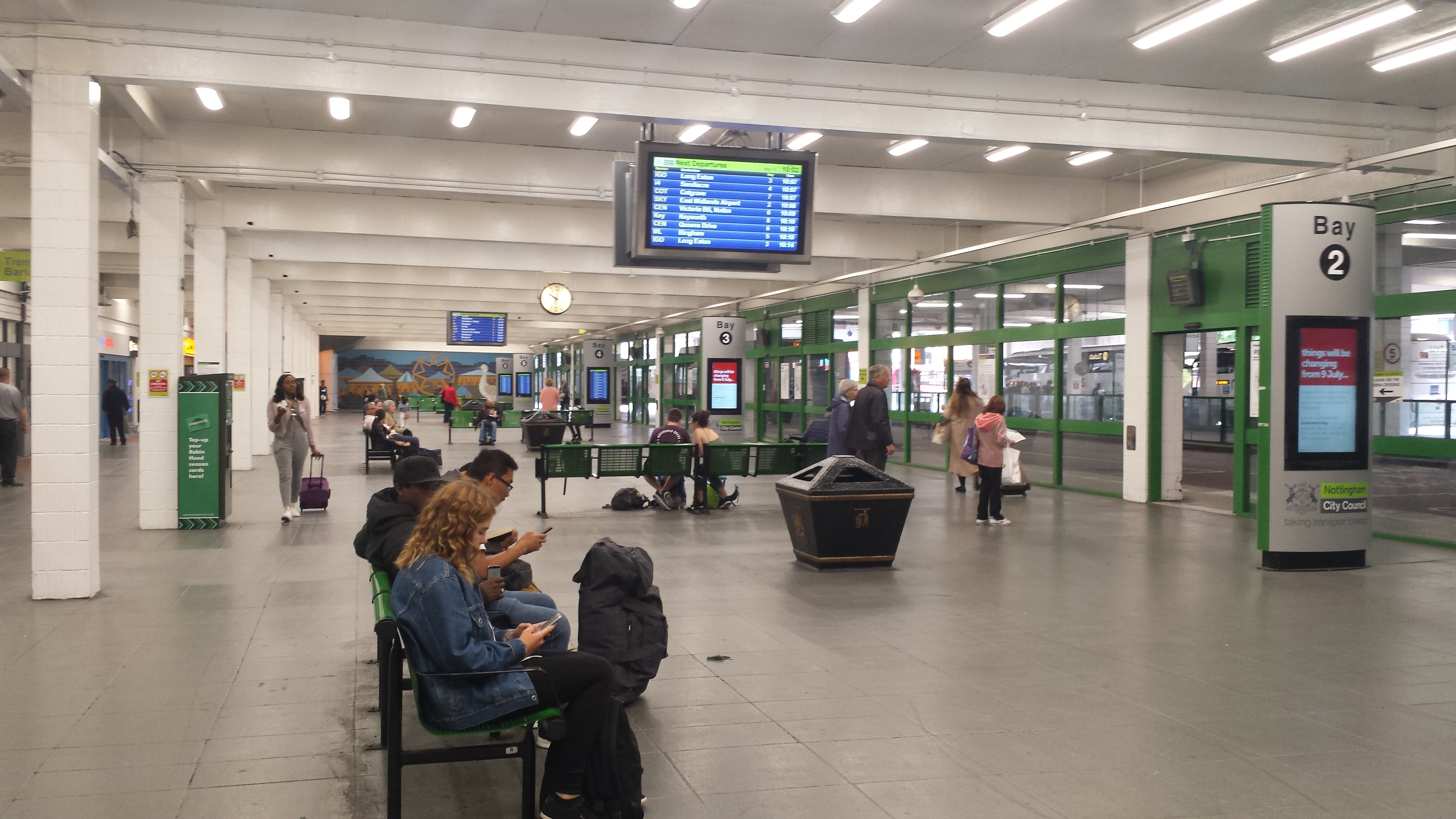
The former departure hall, June 2017

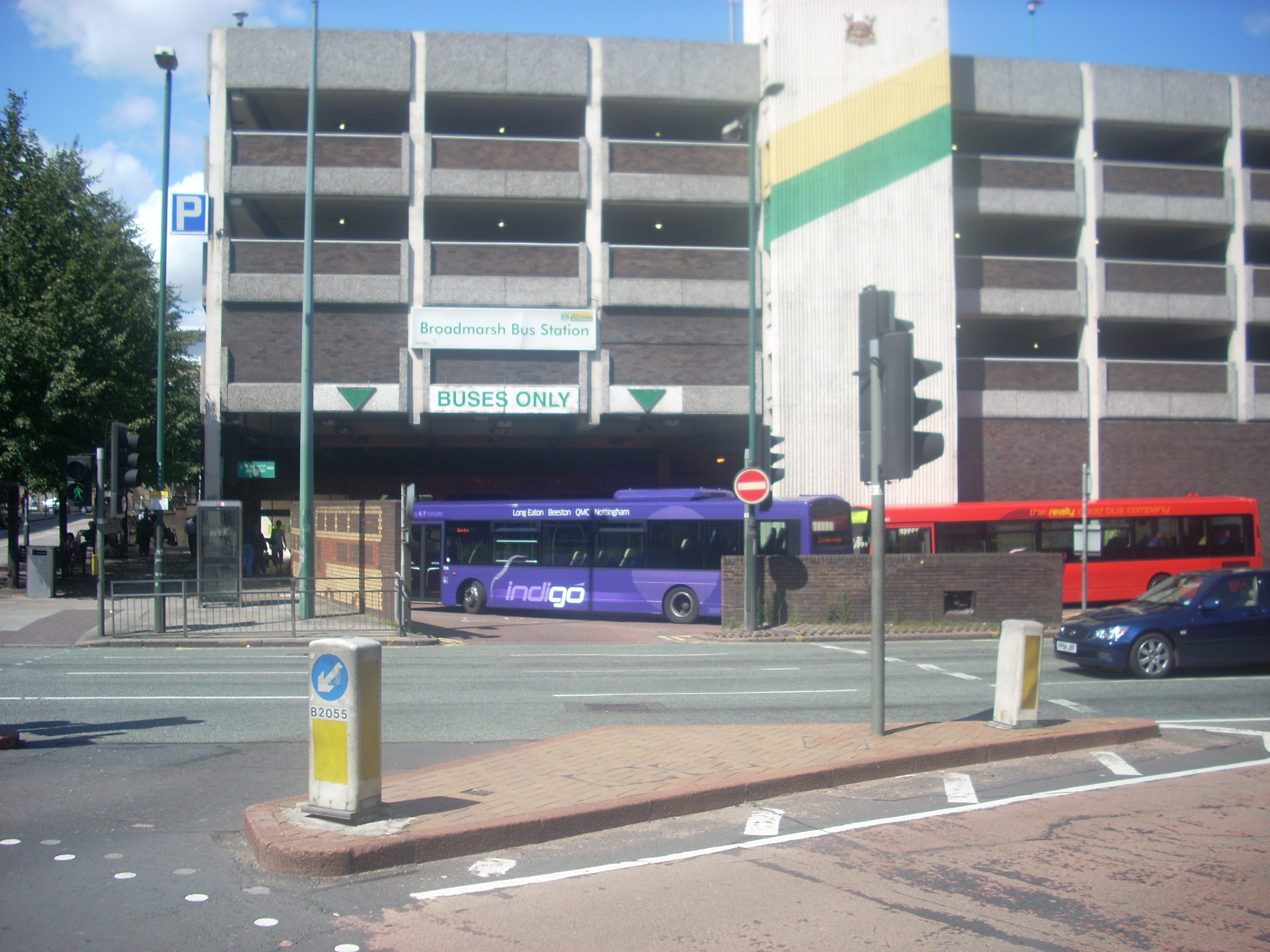
Buses entering the former bus station, July 2009

== See also ==
- Victoria bus station, Nottingham
