= Notch tensile strength =

The notch tensile strength (NTS) of a material is the value given by performing a standard tensile strength test on a notched specimen of the material. The ratio between the NTS and the tensile strength is called the notch strength ratio (NSR).

== See also ==
- Charpy impact test
