= Canoe & Kayak UK =

British canoeing magazine

- September 2010 issue
- Managing editor: Jason Smith
- Categories: Sports magazine
- Frequency: Monthly
- Founder: Heather Gunn
- Founded: 2001
- First issue: 4 March 2001
- Company: Gunn Publishing
- Country: United Kingdom
- Based in: Cheltenham, Gloucestershire
- Language: English
- Website: canoekayak.co.uk

Canoe & Kayak UK was a British canoeing magazine. It was primarily focused on sea, surf and whitewater paddling.

== History ==
Canoe & Kayak UK was founded and published monthly in the UK from March 2001 by Gunn Publishing and bought out by Warners Group Publications plc in 2005. under their Warners Midlands PLC subsidiary, as part of their outdoor and sporting stable.

== Original regular features ==
The magazine had a number of features:

- The Floater – A comment article from an anonymous contributor known only as "The Floater", much like The Stig of the paddling world. His column is invariably comedic and his subjects of discourse range from swans to the Olympics.
- Horizon Lines – The news section, mainly covering paddling news within Britain or of British boaters. Also included within these pages are:
  - RAC News – There is a column from Tamsin Phipps detailing the latest news about the Rivers Access Campaign or related to water access issues and government proceedings related to the issue.
  - Technobabble – A column with excerpts from the forum or website. These may often be photos which have been posted by users on the website, or a question which someone has asked on the forum.
- EDCASE – A page written by Ed Smith, a leading whitewater and freestyle kayaker. His column is often autobiographical and mainly concerned with the whitewater and freestyle scene within the UK.
- Most Wanted – A multi page section with details of newly released kit, and clothing. There is generally a short opinion statement from the magazine testers but the equipment featured has not been tested robustly by the testing team.
- The Toolbox – A regular feature written by Ross Montandon, the assistant editor of the magazine. It provides tips on successful and best practice coaching of canoeing and kayaking.
- PyB – A section written each month by one of the top coaches at Plas y Brenin, the Welsh national outdoor centre. The article may be anything from rescue technique to a guide on what kit to take on a multi-day trip or expedition.
- River Jabber – One of the longest running features, in this section a prominent canoeist is interviewed on the subject of their favourite river or place to paddle. The questions follow the same pattern each month, asking the best and worst experiences the paddler has had on the river.
- CKUK Women – Written by Emily Wall, this is a special section dedicated to women and their involvement in the sport. It may be of a philosophical nature, or may feature women who have been very successful canoeists.
- Club Scene – Each month members of the team travel to a Canoe Club in the UK, and attend one of their meetings.
- Competition – Each month there is a competition for a piece of kit, often a kayak or newly released piece of clothing. The competitions are free to enter on-line or can be entered by post.
- Gear Test – Each month the team test a number of pieces of canoeing gear. The use a large team of staff, so that they can give real opinions on how well the kit works for people of varying sizes and with different amounts of experience.
- Nosebag – This section outlines a recipe which has been designed for cooking with minimal equipment, ideal for multi day trips.

In addition to the articles in the magazine the Canoe & Kayak website features a section of free articles posted monthly. These articles range from reviews of the latest gear to general how-to articles on getting started.

== Local coverage ==
The magazine attended local canoeing events across the country, for example during September 2009, staff visited the Wychavon Kayak and Canoe Club for a pool session.

== Social networks ==
The magazine had its own YouTube channel featuring watersports related video articles and tutorials, in addition to user submitted videos hosted on the magazine website. They also have a Facebook page, where regular updates are posted of upcoming articles from the magazine.

== Blog ==
The magazine website hosted a blog section that invited readers to contribute feedback on the magazine and their own articles on canoeing and kayaking locations and events. The site also hosts blogs from staff and official contributors to the magazine.

== Forum ==
The magazine also had an internet forum in which the editor and writers regularly interact with the readership. Certain questions are posed on a monthly basis with select answers from forum members appearing in the magazine. Forum users can also request articles to be featured by the lead editor.

== Competitions ==
The magazine ran regular competitions in which replying readers have a chance to win free watersport and other outdoor activity equipment.

== Contributors ==
- Olly Sanders
- Jim Evans
- Lucinda Manouch
- Chris 'Air' Harvey
- Tom Laws
- Chris Wheeler
- Ed Smith
