= Broad Marsh =

Historic area of Nottingham

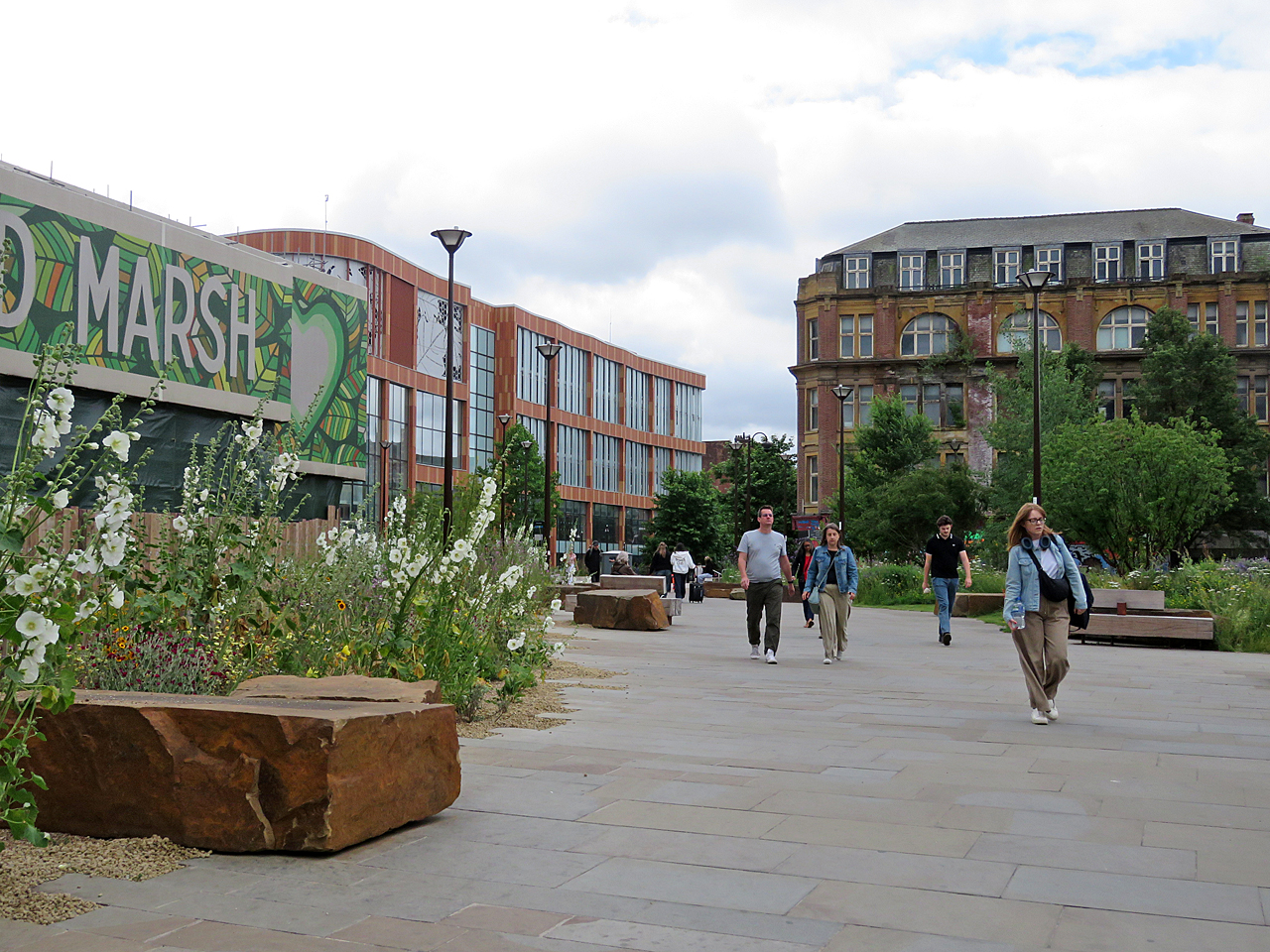
- The Green Heart
- Location: Nottingham City Centre, England
- Coordinates: 52°57′0″N 1°08′55″W
- Address: Lister Gate
- Owner: Nottingham City Council
- Public transit: Broadmarsh bus station

Broad Marsh (formerly stylised as Broadmarsh) is a historic area of Nottingham, England. The area was subjected to large scale slum clearance, creating large spaces used for regeneration. A shopping centre, car park, bus station and road complex created in the early 1970s cut-through the traditional thoroughfares from the city centre to the rail and canalside area. A large courts building was opened in 1981.

With historic large-scale use of concrete and the commercial failure of development organisations, a decision was made in the post-covid era of the 2020s to introduce a green corridor into the area, to be known as "Green Heart".

== History ==
The former shopping precinct known as intu Broadmarsh (formerly known as The Broadmarsh Centre) was located slightly south of the centre of Nottingham, on land owned by Nottingham City Council and formerly leased to Intu Properties. It was partly demolished during renovation work by the intu group.

Following Intu's financial collapse resulting in administration during 2020, the council have undertaken public consultations to find an acceptable outcome for eventual redevelopment, including the former multi-storey car park and bus station.

The intended demolition of the remaining precinct structure was delayed due to the City Council trying to obtain funding from central government under the Levelling up funding scheme announced in 2021. The funding bid was rejected in October 2021, meaning demolition work on the eastern end was further delayed until a new bid for £20 million funding could be submitted after early 2022. When the announcement of funding was made in January 2023, after postponement from October 2022, Nottingham's bid was unsuccessful. In March 2025, the site was acquired for redevelopment by Homes England.

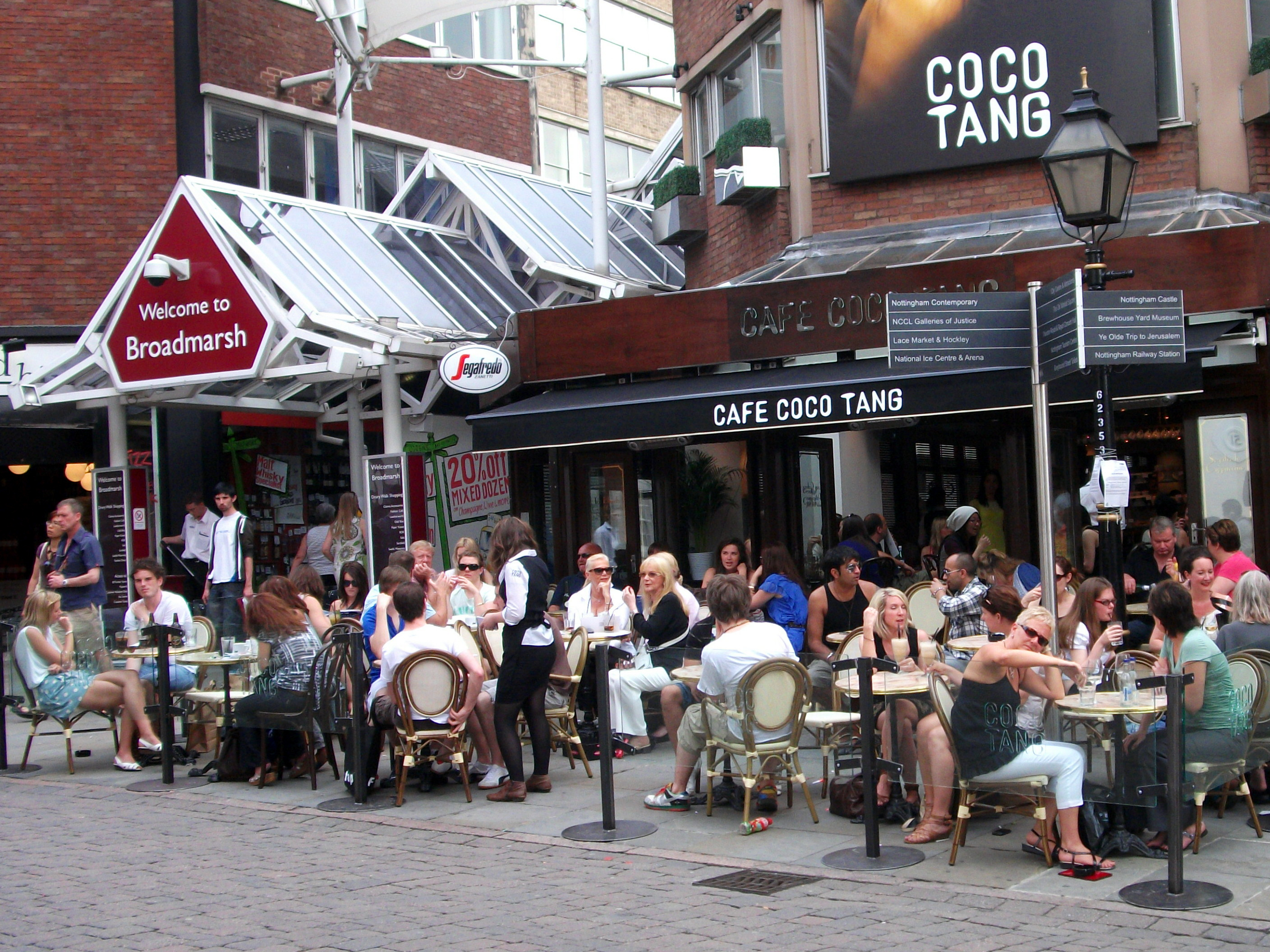
Former cafe beside the centre entrance on Middle Pavement

The shopping centre was built in the early 1970s, in an area known as Broad Marsh, that was historically boggy ground, on the outskirts of the medieval town. It was once occupied by the Franciscan Friary known as Greyfriars, Nottingham, which was dissolved in 1539. The area was cleared of all buildings to accommodate the new shopping centre.

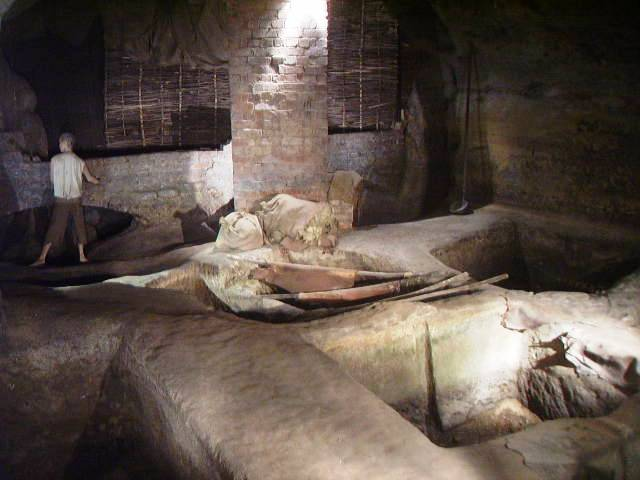
A former tannery within the caves under the shopping centre

During preparation of the site, many caves and cellars dug into the soft sandstone foundations of the city were rediscovered (both ancient and more recent). The caves were to be destroyed as part of the construction, but activism by residents and historians allowed the caves to be preserved. The caves were excavated by staff from Nottingham City Council's museums service and local history enthusiasts. Some were opened to the public as part of the City of Caves museum beneath the shopping centre, and are protected as a Scheduled Monument.

The shopping centre, designed by the architects Turner, Lansdown, Holt and Partners was originally intended to be an Arndale Centre, and the associated parking structure – once voted the "ugliest building in Nottingham" – was known as the Arndale Car Park. Nottingham Corporation Estates Committee decided that the trade name Arndale should be removed from the title. The centre, built at a cost of £7m was officially opened on 25 March 1975 by Prince Richard, Duke of Gloucester and the Duchess of Gloucester.

The centre underwent a major cosmetic refurbishment in 1988 at a cost of £9m.

== Regeneration ==
=== Shopping centre ===
Nottingham City Council, owners of the land leasehold on the centre, had as of 2013 been attempting to encourage development at Broad Marsh for "almost two decades". Their 2002 development brief called for a development that "respects the urban grain of the City Centre, with clear streets and urban blocks of buildings to provide for legibility, separate identity and future flexibility" with a clear north–south route linking Nottingham's Old Market Square and railway station, stating, "This route must take the form of a pedestrianised public street."

In November 2002, plans to demolish the existing shopping centre, car park, and adjoining Broadmarsh bus station were approved.

In April 2007, a plan nearly identical to that proposed in 2002 was approved. The three-year redevelopment plan would have involved the demolition of much of the centre, the car park, and the adjoining bus station.

In November 2011, it was announced that Capital Shopping Centres (CSC), owners of the Victoria Shopping Centre, just north of the city centre, had bought Westfield's stake in Broadmarsh. The purchase prompted an investigation by the Office of Fair Trading and the Competition Commission, which was concerned the company's monopoly over the city's shopping centres could negatively impact competition.

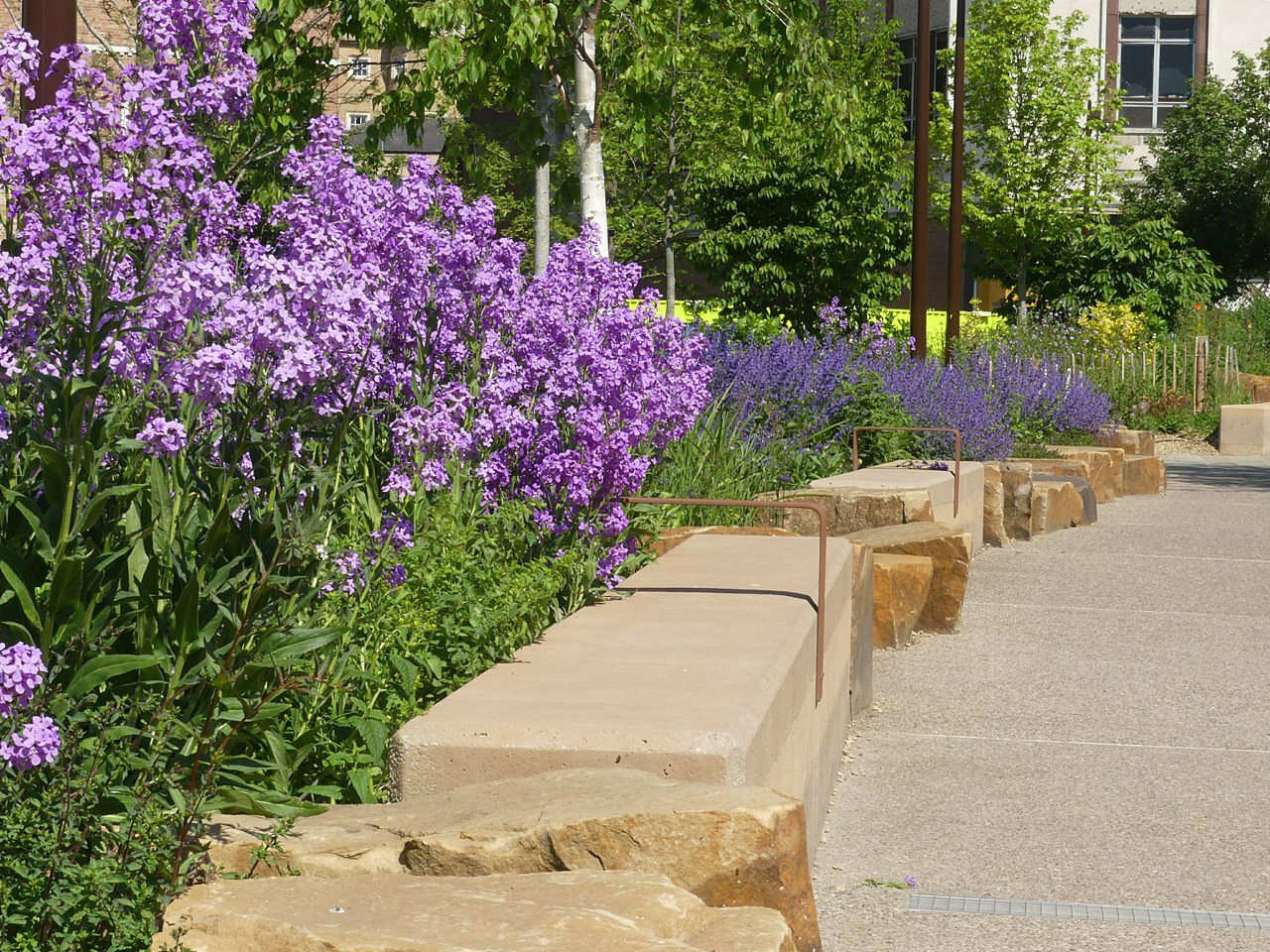
The Green Heart

In February 2013, CSC changed its name to Intu Properties plc. The new owners wished to start an already planned development of the Victoria Centre, but Nottingham City Council insisted that Broadmarsh must be their "priority" and offered £50 million towards its redevelopment.

A 2013 report mentioned that the centre was "half-empty". The deputy leader of Nottingham City Council said the council would withhold planning permission for the development of the Victoria Centre until they "see bulldozers going into the Broadmarsh Centre".

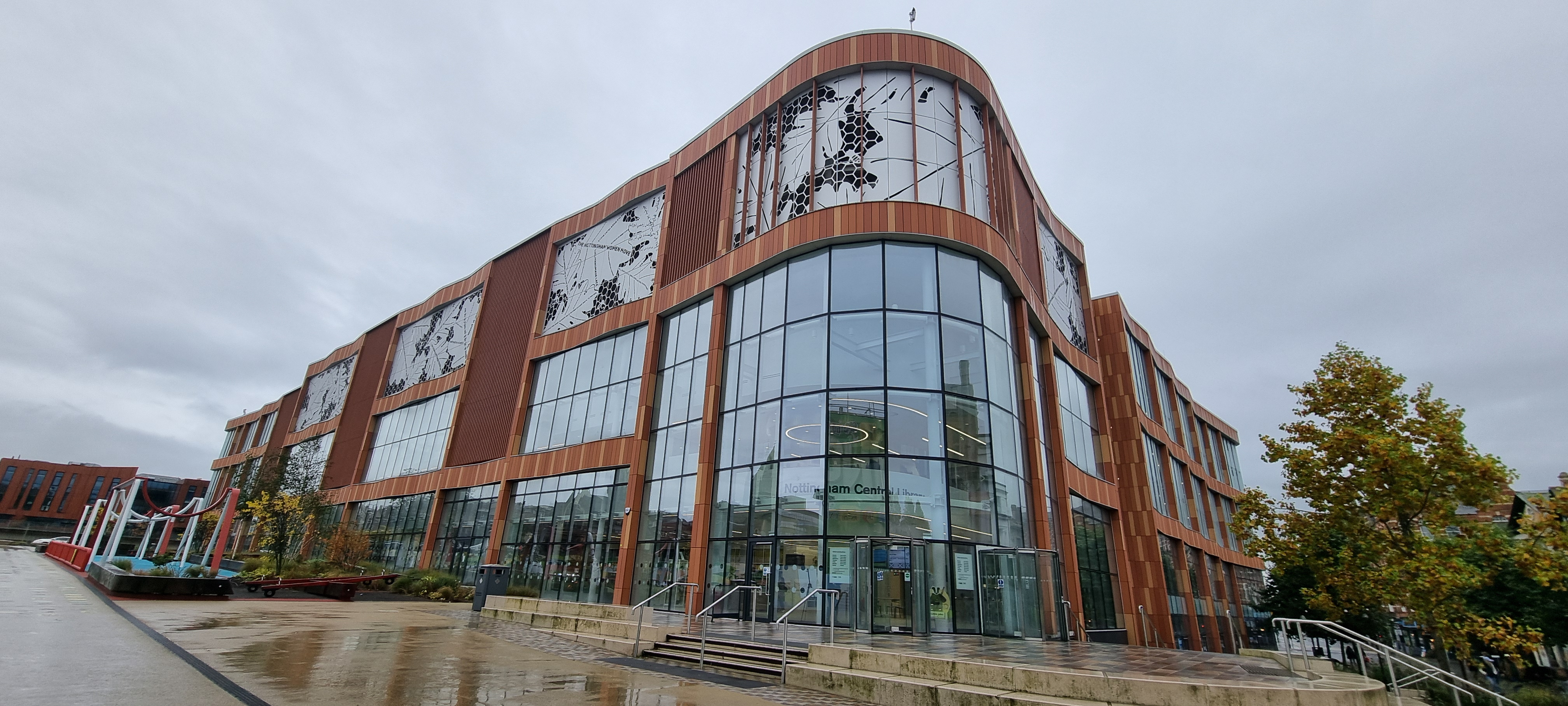
Nottingham Central Library

A new plan for a limited redevelopment of some of the centre received planning approval in June 2015. The plans included the retention of most of the fabric of the 1970s' mall and existing tenants, including Boots, Wilko and BrightHouse, with some cosmetic updating. A nine-screen cinema was to be constructed at a remodelled south-eastern corner, along with new leisure and restaurant spaces. Drury Walk was planned as "Bridlesmith Square", providing a new area outside intu Broadmarsh, targeted at upmarket brands. Counter to the 2002 Development Brief, the new walkway between the city centre and station was planned to be within the existing enclosed shopping mall, under a new glass roof.

Construction company Sir Robert McAlpine Ltd were given the contract to start work on the long-awaited redevelopment of the centre with phased-demolition of the Broadmarsh starting in October 2019. Due to the COVID-19 pandemic, redevelopment work was halted in March 2020. Despite a relaxation of rules allowing construction projects to continue, contractors failed to return to the site in May 2020, with equipment and scaffolding being removed in June 2020, and the public right of way through the centre being closed by Intu citing safety concerns.

Work was halted in June 2020, owing to the owners Intu Properties entering administration. By early July 2020, the part-demolished shopping centre had closed and the site was handed back to the freeholder, Nottingham City Council.

On 6 August 2020, it was announced that the centre would be completely demolished at a cost of £8 million. A mixed-use future development is possible.

Part of the former Broadmarsh Shopping Centre at Collin Street opposite Carrington Street junction, location of the entrance to the initial covered pedestrian walkway through the site linking to Lister Gate shopping area. A new open-air route through the site was opened in September 2022.

As of October 2021, the site remained only partly demolished due to Nottingham City Council's bid to obtain extra government funding. A new pedestrian covered walkway was created through the demolition site, linking the rail station area to the city centre, allowing for future clearance of the remaining 1970s structure. In that month, the funding bid was rejected, meaning demolition work on the eastern end was further delayed until a new bid for extra funding can be submitted after spring 2022. Demolition of the western end of the former shopping area continued as some funding had been obtained from D2N2, the LEP for East Midlands.

In December 2021, the scheme for redevelopment was reported. The concept, headed by designer Thomas Heatherwick, allows for retention of some structural remains of the centre, as a framework and basis for extensive soft landscaping, provisionally entitled The Frame.

When the announcement of funding was made in January 2023, Nottingham's bid to finish the Broadmarsh was unsuccessful, as was the bid for the nearby Island Quarter development. The city council vowed to continue pursuing outside funding to achieve The Frame concept. 2024 saw the city council allocating "...up to £100,000..." to an outside consultancy to ascertain the commercial viability of creating a medical multi-scanning facility within the site.

In March 2025, the Broadmarsh site, left partially demolished since intu went bust in 2020, was acquired by Homes England, who planned to partner with private firms to redevelop the site. Along with neighbouring land, the site would be used to provide around 1,000 homes and up to 20,000 square metres of retail, office and community facilities.

=== Car park ===
In October 2021, it was announced that the new multi-storey car park with 1,200 spaces, 90 motorcycle bays and 81 electric charge points was finished with anticipated opening on 1 November.

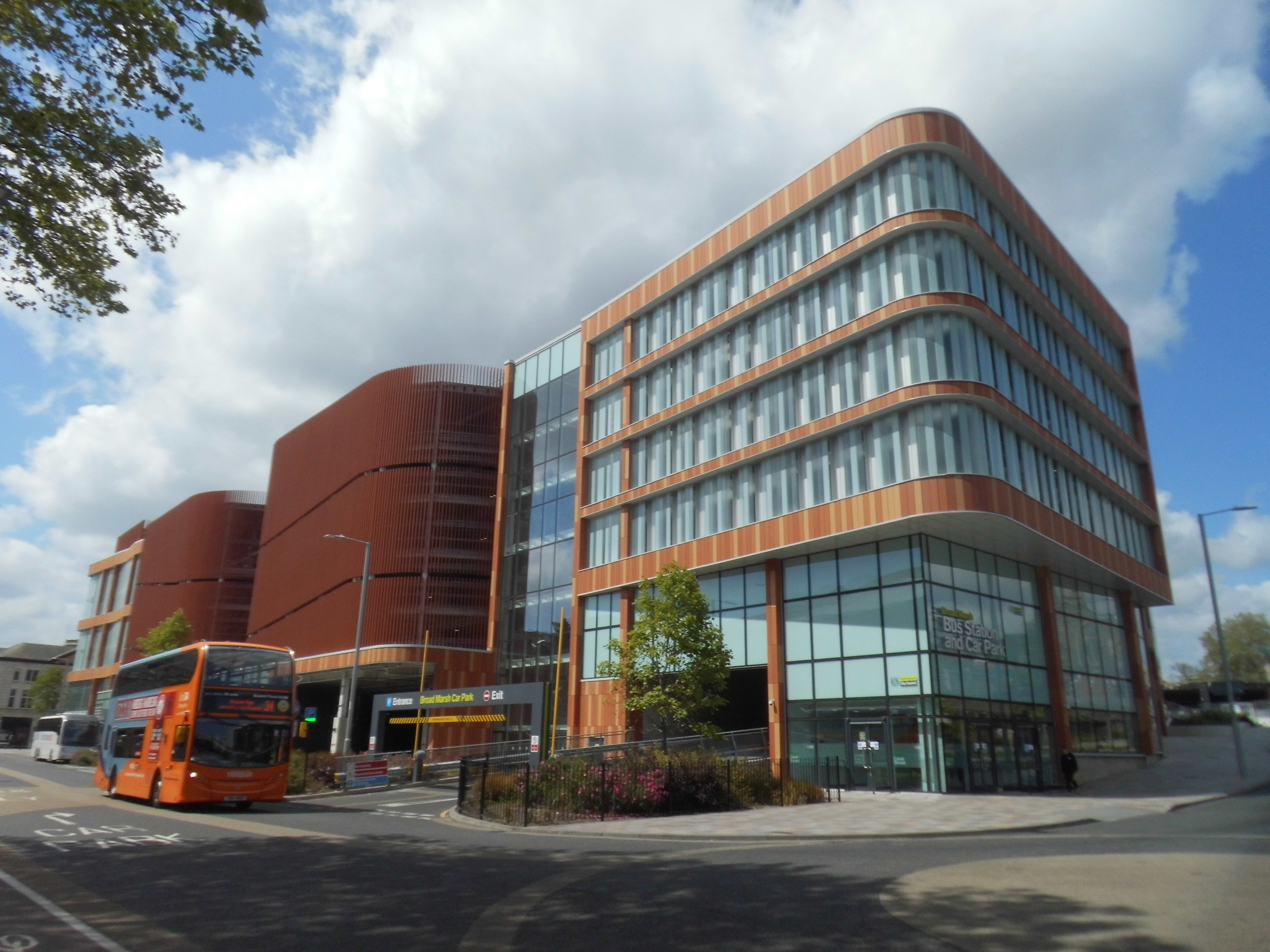
The Broadmarsh Bus Station and Car Park in 2023

Nottingham City Council were obligated to finish the car park project, although they had reservations about usage as the shopping centre rebuild was not undertaken, it was hoped the nearby College and Castle would offset the loss of shoppers. The design allowed for a high-level footbridge.

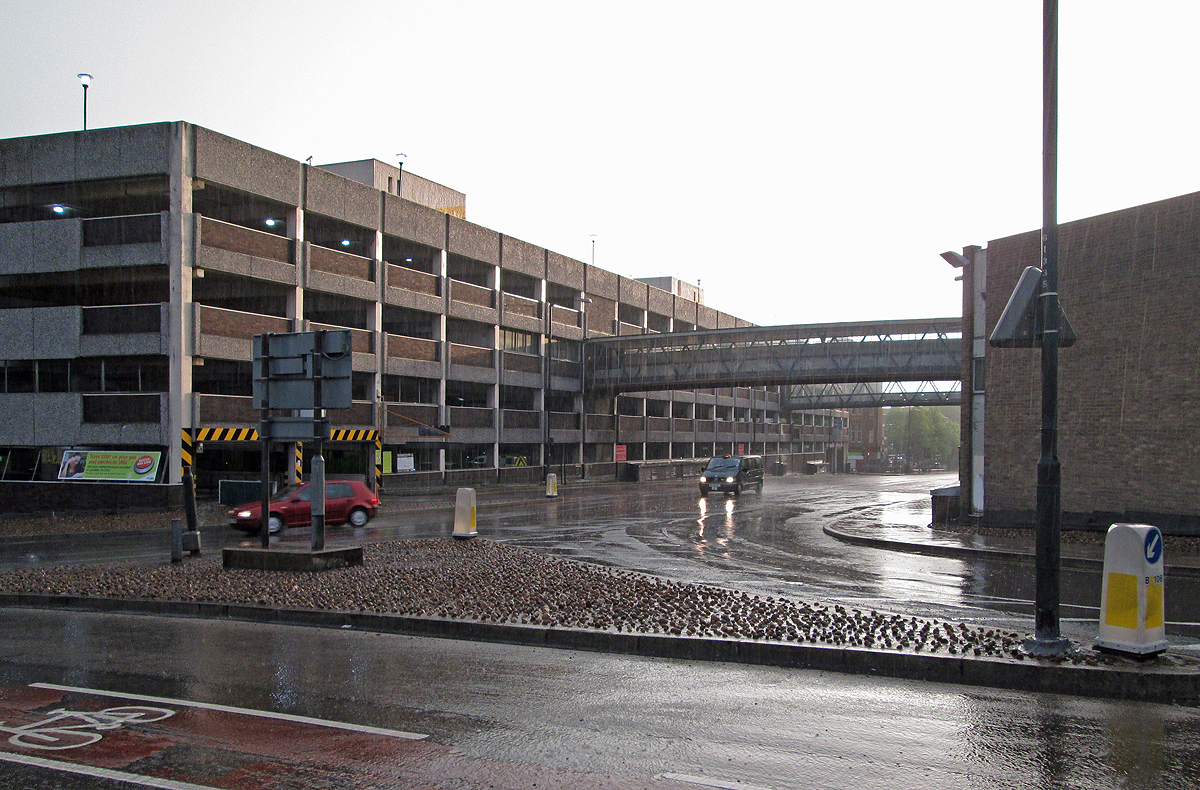
Collin Street Nottingham with two high level pedestrian walkways linking between the old Broadmarsh car park to left and Broadmarsh shopping centre to right

The 1970s multi-storey car park with bus station underneath was demolished between 2017 and 2018.

=== Central Library ===
The central library originally located at Angel Row off the city centre was closed during the COVID-19 restrictions, with re-opening abandoned due to difficulties in making a COVID-safe environment. Provision was made during redevelopment for a new facility as part of the car park and bus station complex. As of January 2022, no opening date was anticipated as contractors were being invited to submit new estimates for fitting-out of the new building, with the books still in storage. The new library was opened on 28 November 2023 with a video-testimonial by Dolly Parton, whose own literary charity project, the Imagination Library, has donated books for the use of children since 1995.

=== City Hub ===
A 2017 plan to redevelop the adjacent land along Canal Street, for the benefit of Nottingham College, was approved. Work started on the £58m City Hub in 2018. It is a six-storey building designed by Sheffield-based architecture firm Bond Bryan. Constructed by Wates it was intended to provide training and employment opportunities including 24 work placements, 16 new jobs, 13 apprentice placements and training for 11 NVQs.

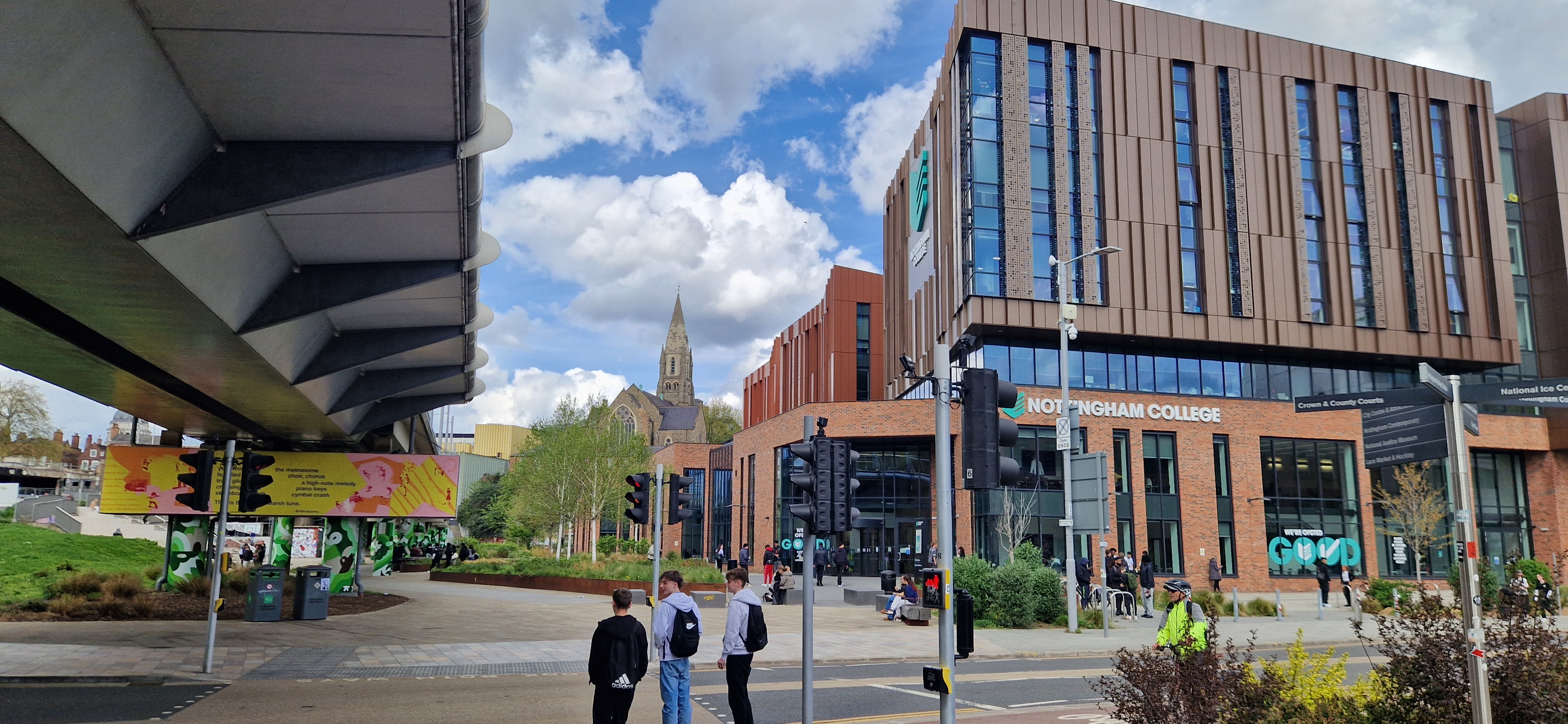
City Hub, Nottingham College

=== Skate Park ===
A dedicated skating area using a special smooth treatment to the surfacing was created under the elevated section of the tram lines, as part of the street scene regeneration. Close to Nottingham College, it forms part of an intended eventual walk-through to the city centre.

=== Bus lane ===
The traffic flow around the old Broadmarsh centre was altered in September 2020, as part of the overall scheme to create a "pedestrian-friendly" area stretching to the City Hub, with a bus-only lane being implemented. In March 2022, responding to a Freedom of Information request, it was confirmed that automatic cameras had instigated fines totalling over £965,000, allocated to Nottingham City Council. The Council commented that the money was used to pay for the camera system, with any surplus going towards "traffic initiatives".

Responding to a Freedom of Information request in January 2022, the council confirmed that, for the period of 1 December 2021 to 12 December 2021, a total of 2,066 Penalty Charge Notices were issued for two camera locations on Canal Street. The council confirmed in February 2022 that it had placed a maintenance contract with the supplier of the ANPR camera system covering the city, at a cost £187,000 for the period of October 2021 to the end of September 2022.

== The Green Heart ==
With large-scale use of concrete becoming aestheically unappealing, the commercial failure of traditional development organisations to provide any replacement shopping areas and changing public buying trends favouring out-of-town complexes, a decision was made to introduce a 20 acres (8.1 ha) open space as a green corridor into the area, to be known as "Green Heart". Officially opened on 4 September 2024, it has been granted a Green Flag Award.

=== Standing in This Place ===
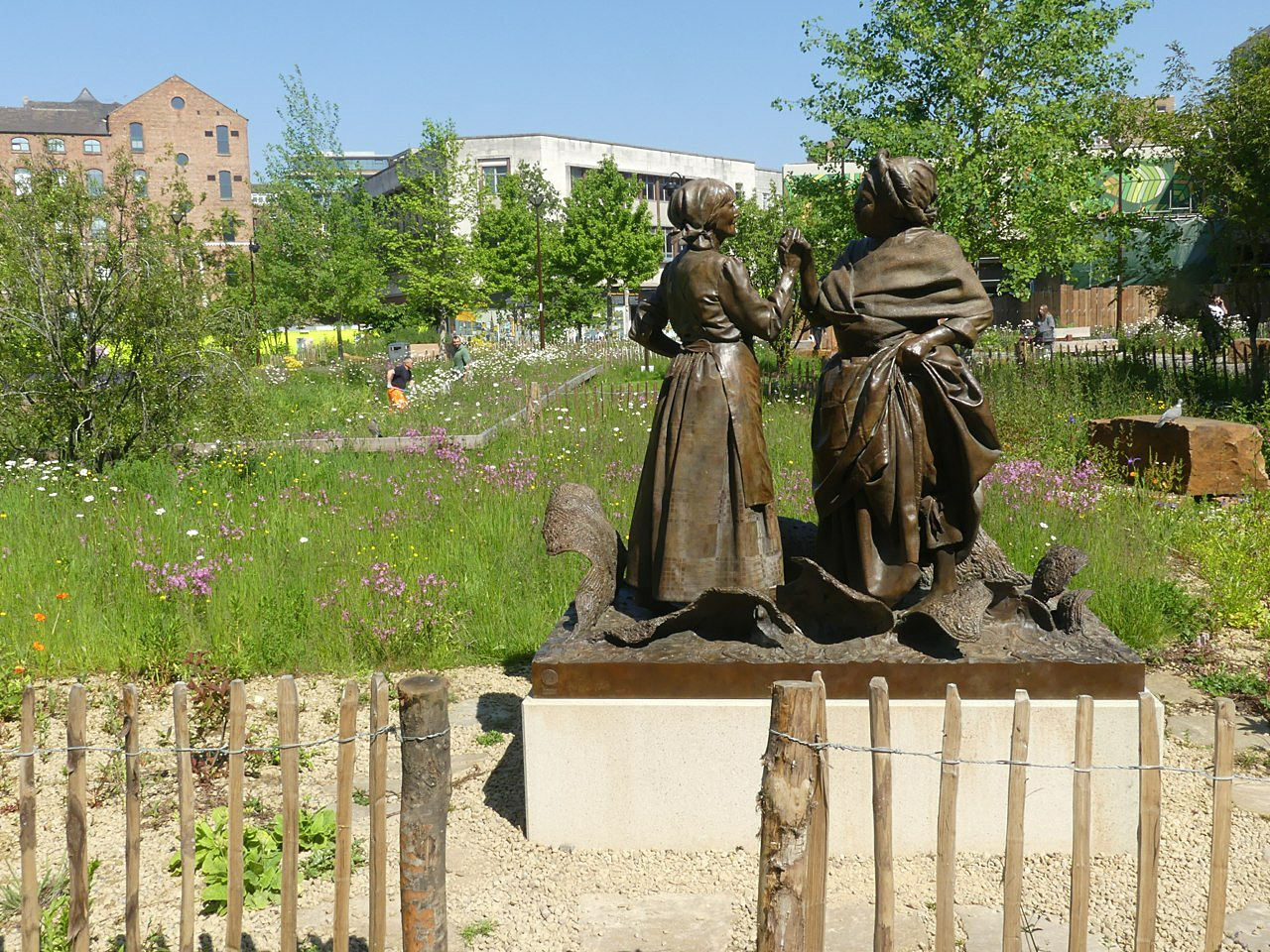
The Standing in This Place sculpture

In February 2025 a sculpture titled Standing in This Place was installed in the Broad Marsh Green Heart area. The work shows an enslaved black cotton field–working woman and a white cotton mill–working woman, clasping hands. It represents two aspects of the cotton and lace industry: the growing of cotton by enslaved labourers and its processing in the mills around Nottingham. The sculpture is curated by the National Justice Museum, and was paid for by donations from public bodies and individuals. It was created by the sculptor Rachel Carter and the black-led local group Legacy Makers, and followed a project which explored the stories of workers at Darley Abbey Mill.
