= National Student Rodeo =

Freestyle kayaking event in the UK

National Student Rodeo was a freestyle kayaking event in the UK hosted by Leeds University Canoe Club. The National Student Rodeo was the biggest freestyle kayaking competition in the world, with 670 entrants and over 1000 party goers from 36 universities at its peak. It was held annually at Holme Pierrepont (HPP) National Water Sports Centre in Nottingham.

== Organisation ==
The National Student Rodeo was organized and managed by a group of volunteers. Those in charge were responsible for booking the venue, coordinating university attendance, arranging camping, finding sponsors, promoting the event, and managing other necessary tasks. Event safety, first aid, judging, commentary, bar staffing, and general assistance were handled by members of LUUCC, River Legacy, and other volunteers.

The focus of the competition was always been on the "fun" aspect of the sport, in order to encourage participation from novice paddlers. This was mirrored in the prize-giving ceremonies, where the best prizes were saved for the novice and intermediate categories. However this was not to say that competition in the expert finals was not fierce. Many of the UK's best freestyle paddlers have competed at the event, former and current GB Freestyle Team members, loads of sponsored team paddlers and even more up-and-coming talent. The now legendary NSR parties were thoroughly compered and DJ'd to death by the Extreme Events crew, with waffle, banter, gibberish and occasionally the odd bit of useful information from DJ's Al, Shifty, Disco Dave and Tea Boy Tom. Extreme Events retired from the Rodeo in 2016 after a decade of brilliance.

The 'National Student Rodeo' name harks back to the olden days of kayaking, when freestyle was referred to as 'rodeo'. Although a renaming was briefly considered in 2004, 'The Rodeo' has stayed true to its roots.

== Format ==
The core events for the competition was as follows:

- Extreme Slalom - All competitors for K1 and C1 (Men's and Women's) entered this event to be seeded for the heats.
- Men's Novice K1
- Men's Intermediate K1
- Men's Expert K1
- Women's Novice K1
- Women's Intermediate K1
- Women's Expert K1
- C1
- Squirt
- Topo Duo
- Open event

A "King of the Wave" invitational event was held in 2006 but this has not been continued - Jon Fuller remains the official NSR King of the Wave.

NSR MMX (2010) saw the introduction of 2 new events: 'Old Skool' replaced the traditional Open event and saw competitors hotdog it out in boats and kit pre-2000 with Dave Burne of York coming out on top. There was also in the introduction of the "Kukri Sofa Cross" which saw 80 competitors race down the course at Holme Pierrepont on inflatable sofas.

In 2020 a Boater X style event was organised by Matt Wallace. It saw a timed race with "le mans" start (starting on the bank outside of kayaks) and groups of competitors race to lap the course through slalom gates.

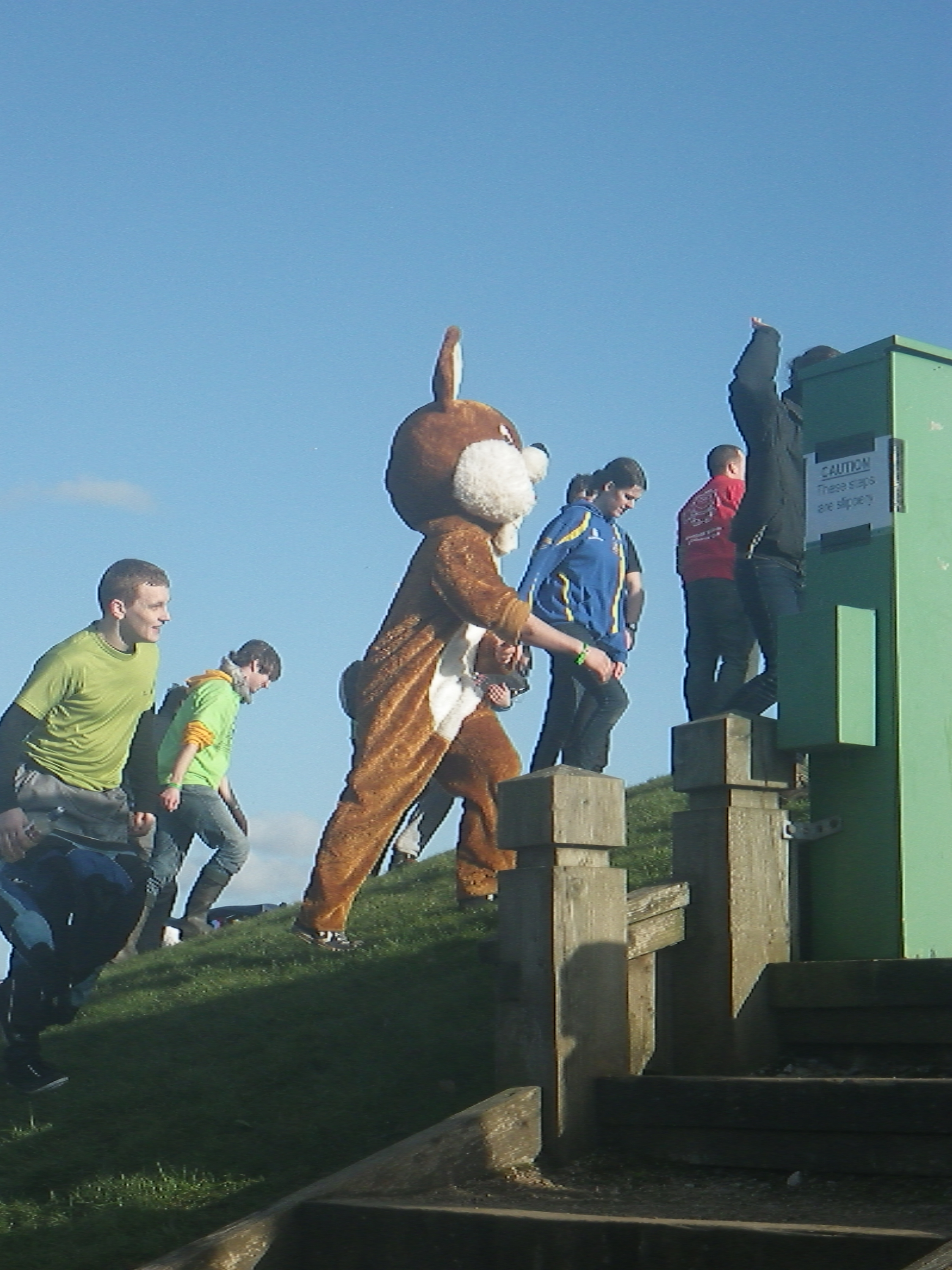
The 'Rodeo Rabbit' has made many appearances at NSR.

While the competition took up the daytime schedule of the Rodeo, most students attended for the parties that took place on the Friday and Saturday night in the rugby club and marquee. While Friday night saw most of the universities arriving on site around 8PM, there was still plenty of fun to be had, and the bars stayed open until 2AM. However, Saturday was the big party organised by River Legacy, and saw all of the participants in their fancy dress finery attending. The festival atmosphere and legendary parties earn the Rodeo its place as the best student kayaking event of the year.

Other highlights of the weekend included 'Up-time': the time of day when all competitors are woken up from their slumbers (normally with the aid of a megaphone) to make sure that they attend their heats and fit into the hectic schedule that results from the fact that the organisers must fit in time for nearly 700 competitors to have at least two runs down the course.

== Sponsorship ==
Long-term sponsors of the NSR included PGL, Desperate Measures canoe and kayak shop, Palm Equipment / Dagger Europe and Pyranha. Many of the sponsors donated hugely both in terms of money and prizes for the events, as well as providing food for the volunteers, supporting equipment for the Safety team, and essential supplies for the First Aid team.

== Media ==
Due to its size and reputation, the media presence surrounding the event evolved over time. For example, in 2007 the event was trailed online with several humorous videos which can be found here. The 2008 event was filmed by Liquid Satisfaction and was sold as a DVD. This has since been released as a free podcast and both can be found at maxbilbow.com. The event has also been covered by Canoe & Kayak, Kayak Session, and The Paddler magazines.

Local news broadcasters have also covered the event - one such report can be seen here.

== History ==
Year	Event organiser(s)	Overall winners	Colour	Party Theme	Official T-shirt slogan(s)
2023	Rachel Jones and Yael May	Event cancelled!	Black, red, yellow, blue	Retirement Party	Long live the rodeo
2020	Matt Wallace and Kate Loveday	Nottingham	Green	Games Night	
2019	Ruby Pelling and Chloe Ryan	Notthingham	Turquoise & Purple	A Journey Through Time	
2018	John Docherty and Amie Shute	Event cancelled due to snow!	Green	Countries of the World	Rodeo Makes The World Go Round
2017	Beth Preston and Struan Fishburn	Nottingham	Blue	The Apocalypse	
2016	Rhys Williamson and Simon North	Nottingham	Red	Christmas	?
2015	Simon North and Sarah Waddington	Sheffield	Blue / Turquoise	Carnival	??
2014	Andy Canavan and Sam Newman	Nottingham	Blue	Heroes & Villains	??
2013	Tom Oram and Harry Grace	Nottingham	Red	Circus	?
2012	Beth Morgan and Jake Ward	Southampton	Green	Jungle	?
2011	Nicola Underhill and Jethro House	Nottingham	Orange/Yellow	Beach Party	?
2010	Andy Jaunzems and Peter Haynes	Leeds	Purple	Ancient Civilizations	?
2009	Luke Farrington and Paul Wilkinson	Leeds	Blue	Space	?
2008	Tim Trew and Nick Horwood	Nottingham Trent	Green	Pirates	Yarrrrrrr
2007	Adam Dumolo and Sara James	Leeds	Red	Wild West	The Good, The Bad and The Ugly (three separate designs)
2006	Sara James and Sam Ward	Sheffield	Ginger	'70s	?
2005	Tim Stevenson	Loughborough	Blue	Bad Taste	(Regular) Its a rodeo Jim, but not as we know it / (Judges) Those who can, do. Those who can't, judge / (Safety) Don't you worry, its going to be all right
2004	Kirsty Archibald	Leeds	Green	School Disco	Lick my deck / Rodeo at its breast
2003	Will Hemming	Leeds	Yellow	Gangsters & Molls	I used to be a rodeo champion but my horse drowned
2002	Will Hemming	Leeds	Black	No theme, just a big party in a big field nowhere near HPP!	?
2001	Ian Wood and Karen Evans	Event cancelled due to Foot and Mouth	-	-	-
2000	Steve Blagg and Lynne Wallis	?	?	?	?

1999 - ??

1998 - ??

1997 - Arran Stephenson and Rachel Sutton

1996 - Arran Stephenson and Paul Shelly

== See also ==
- Freeboating
- Playboating
