= Mark Woodhead =

British pulmonologist

Professor Mark Andrew Woodhead FRCP FERS (born 21 December 1954) is a world authority on lung infection and pneumonia. He has been the National Clinical Adviser on pneumonia to the Department of Health since 2010, a Consultant in General and Respiratory Medicine at the Manchester Royal Infirmary since 1992, Honorary Clinical Professor of Respiratory Medicine at the University of Manchester since 2011 and an Honorary Research Fellow of the Liverpool School of Tropical Medicine since 2013.

== Early life ==
Mark Andrew Woodhead was born on 21 December 1954. He was educated at Bedford Modern School and King's College London where he graduated with first class honours in 1976 and was made MBBS in 1979. He was made DM at the University of Nottingham in 1988.

== Career ==
Woodhead started his career as House Officer at King's College Hospital in 1979 before spending five months at the Queen Elizabeth Hospital, King's Lynn. He was Senior House Officer at the Nottingham City Hospital and Nottingham General Hospital between 1980 and 1982 before his appointment as Registrar in Medicine at the Nottingham University Hospitals. He was made Senior Registrar of St George's Hospital and the Royal Brompton Hospital in 1987 until his appointment as a Consultant in General and Respiratory Medicine at the Manchester Royal Infirmary in 1992.

Woodhead is a world authority on lung infection and pneumonia. He is a member of the British Thoracic Society, a Fellow of the European Respiratory Society, a member of the American Thoracic Society, Chairman of the European Respiratory Society’s Lower Respiratory Infection Guidelines Group and a section editor of the European Respiratory Journal. He is also a member (and Chairman of the Public Education subcommittee) of the Department of Health Specialist Advisory Committee on Antimicrobial Resistance, a member of the British Thoracic Society Pneumonia Guidelines Committee and editor of the international textbook Respiratory Infections.

Woodhead was made MRCP in 1982 and FRCP in 1996. He was made Honorary Clinical Professor of Respiratory Medicine at the University of Manchester in 2011 and Honorary Research Fellow of the Liverpool School of Tropical Medicine in 2013.

== Selected work ==
- Woodhead, Mark (1993). "Guidelines on the management of asthma". Thorax. 48 (2 Suppl): S1 – S24. doi:10.1136/thx.48.2_Suppl.S1. OCLC 28012001. PMC 467832. PMID 8322228.
- Respiratory Infections. Published by Taylor & Francis, 2006. ISBN 9781282615816
