= Dunkirk, Nottingham =

Area of Nottingham, England

Coordinates: 52.939°N 1.184°W

Dunkirk
- Location within Nottinghamshire
- Population: 10,920 (ward. 2011)
- OS grid reference: SK5483338302
- Unitary authority: Nottingham
- Ceremonial county: Nottinghamshire
- Region: East Midlands
- Country: England
- Sovereign state: United Kingdom
- Post town: NOTTINGHAM
- Postcode district: NG7
- Dialling code: 0115
- Police: Nottinghamshire
- Fire: Nottinghamshire
- Ambulance: East Midlands
- UK Parliament: Nottingham South

Dunkirk is a residential area of Nottingham, England which is located to the south-east of the University of Nottingham and the Queen's Medical Centre. It is in the electoral ward of 'Dunkirk and Lenton', part of the Nottingham South constituency, with a population of 10,920 in the 2011 census.

While home to many permanent residents of Nottingham, the area also houses numerous students, including many international students, mainly from east and south-east Asia. The area has become increasingly popular in the last decade due to its proximity to the university.

Dunkirk has a nursery, primary school and the Nottingham University Academy of Science and Technology; socially, there is the Old Lenton and Dunkirk Community Centre.

Dunkirk also has a small industrial area, next to the Nottingham Canal. Nottingham Science and Technology Park, Nottingham Science Park, is also located in Dunkirk.

There is a large cinema and entertainment centre across the canal from Dunkirk, adjacent to Clifton Boulevard (A52 road).

== Demography ==
Dunkirk has a population of just over 10,000, with the average household size being 2.90, and the population density per hectare is 20.90.

Dunkirk is ethnically mixed, with 60% of the people being White British and 40% being from various countries such as: 5.1% from Iran, 4.7% from India, 3.69% from Pakistan, 6.05% from China, 3.6% from Africa, 3.5% from the Caribbean and 2% from the Arab World.

36.3% of the population consider themselves Christian, 10.3% consider themselves Muslim, 2.8% are Hindu, 1.2% are Jewish, 1.9% are Buddhist and 1.4% are Sikh.

60.4% of the people are aged between 16-24 and 11.5% are 30–44, highlighting Dunkirk's high student population due to its proximity to Nottingham's University Park Campus.

== Healthcare ==
The Queen's Medical Centre is an accident and emergency hospital situated in the area. Until 2012, the QMC was the largest hospital in the United Kingdom; it continues to be the largest teaching hospital in Europe. The hospital employs over 6,000 people and the total floor area of the main block is 30 square miles.

The QMC has an overhead bridge to the University of Nottingham main campus. Inside the QMC there is a hotel, academy, Costa, clothes shops and Amigos.

There is a stop for the Nottingham Express Tram at the Queen's Medical Centre.

== Economy ==
Dunkirk is situated in an important economical zone for the Nottingham Urban Area; along with neighbouring Beeston Rylands, it is home to a number of international and regional headquarters such as Games Workshop, Experian, Black Horse, CIS, Abbeyfield Estates, Specsavers, Arck, Coutts, Zurich, HSBC, Speedo, Bank of England, tcp, HBOS plc and Vision Express.

== Retail ==
Dunkirk's surrounding area is home to two retail parks, Castle Marina Retail Park and Riverside Retail Park. Castle Marina Retail Park is filled with a number of high-profile furniture shops, Costa, Sainsbury's and several eateries. Riverside Retail Park has a B&Q megastore, Next and Boots as well as a few high street units.

== Sport ==
Dunkirk F.C. is the local football club. The club plays in the United Counties League Division One.

== Neighbouring areas ==
- Lenton to the north and east.
- Beeston to the west and south-west.

== Transport ==
Bus services in Dunkirk, Nottingham
Bus operator	Line	Destination(s)	Notes
Nottingham City Transport	34	Nottingham → Derby Road → QMC → University Park Campus	
Nottingham City Transport	48	Nottingham → Railway Station → Meadows → Electric Avenue → Clifton Bridge → Clifton (Southchurch Drive, Nobel Road)	
Nottingham City Transport	48X	Nottingham → Railway Station → Meadows → Queen's Drive → Clifton Bridge → Clifton (Southchurch Drive, Nobel Road)	
Nottingham City Transport	49	Nottingham → Railway Station → Queen's Drive → NG2 Business Park → Electric Avenue → Clifton Bridge → Thane Road → Boots Factory	
Nottingham City Transport	49X	Nottingham → Railway Station → Queen's Drive → NG2 Business Park → Queen's Drive → Clifton Bridge → Thane Road → Boots Factory	
Nottingham City Transport	53	Arnold → Daybrook → City Hospital → Basford → Western Boulevard → Jubilee Campus → QMC → Showcase Cinemas → Clifton	
Nottingham City Transport	53B	Daybrook → City Hospital → Basford → Western Boulevard → Jubilee Campus → QMC → Showcase Cinemas → Clifton	
Trentbarton	eighteen	Nottingham → Beeston → Stapleford	
Trentbarton	indigo	Nottingham → Long Eaton → Derby / Briar Gate	
Trentbarton	Skylink Nottingham	Nottingham → Long Eaton → East Midlands Airport → Loughborough / Coalville	
Trentbarton	20	Nottingham → Rylands → Beeston → Stapleford → Ilkeston → Heanor	
Nottingham Community Transport	L64	Nottingham → QMC → Fabis Drive → Clifton	
Nottingham Community Transport	W1	Nottingham → Castle Bridge Road → Lenton Lane Industrial Estate	
Nottingham Community Transport	Centrelink	Victoria Bus Station → Maid Marian Way → Nottingham Train Station → Queen's Drive P&R	
Nottingham Community Transport	Medilink	City Hospital → Wilkinson Street P&R → QMC → Queen's Drive P&R	
University Hopperbus	901	Nottingham (Weekends) → University Park → Showcase Cinemas → Clifton Lane → Sutton Bonington	
