= Teddy bear toss =

Christmas tradition at sporting events

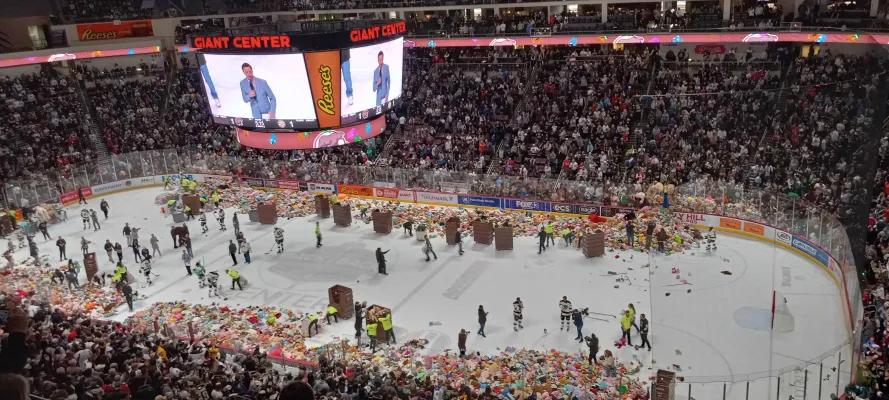
2025 Hershey Bears Teddy bear toss

The teddy bear toss (French: Le match des toutous) is a popular Christmas season promotion most common at junior ice hockey and minor league hockey games. Fans are encouraged to bring teddy bears or other stuffed toys to the game, and to throw them onto the ice when the home team scores its first goal. The toys are gathered to be donated as presents to hospitals and charities. In many cases, the players themselves personally donate some of the bears to children at area hospitals.

The Hershey Bears claim a record of 102,343 stuffed toys in a single hockey game, and have collected more than 566,000 stuffed toys since in 2001. The promotion has spread to other sports including basketball and soccer; and across the globe to Europe and Australia. Polish football club Jagiellonia Białystok claim a world record of 109,470 stuffed toys at any sporting event.

== History ==
The event encourages spectators to bring teddy bears or other stuffed toys to games, and to throw them onto the ice when the home team scores its first goal. The toys are gathered to be donated as presents to hospitals and charities. In many cases, the players themselves personally donate some of the bears to children at area hospitals.

The concept originated with the Kamloops Blazers in 1993, thanks to marketing director Don Larson. The first recorded teddy bear toss occurred on December 5, 1993, when a goal by Brad Lukowich prompted fans to throw over 2,400 bears onto the ice. The tradition spread quickly through the Canadian Hockey League, and around the world; excluding the National Hockey League, which discourages anything thrown on the ice.

== Notable games ==
=== In North America ===
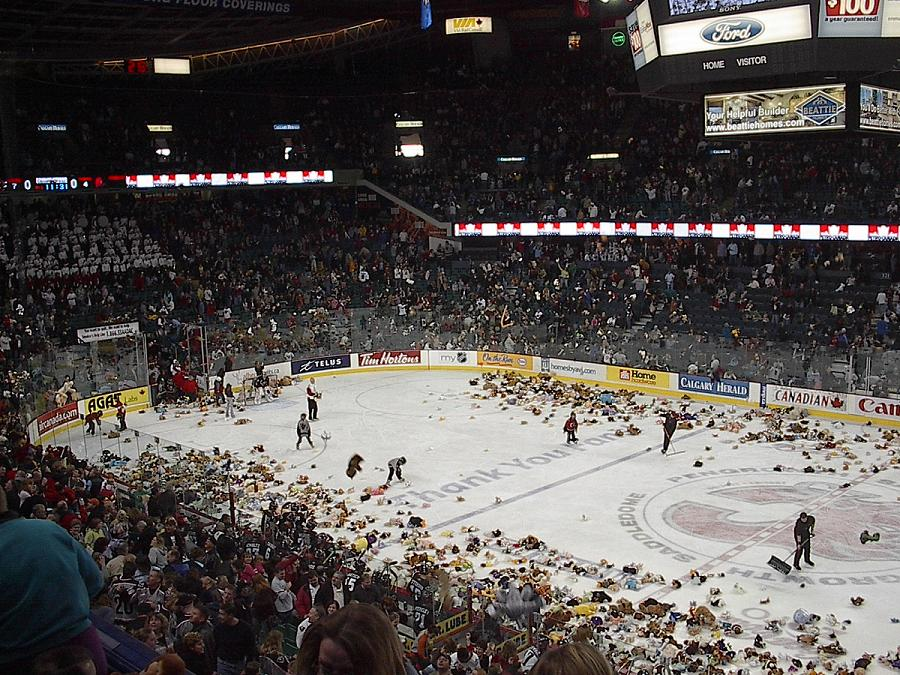
2005 Calgary Hitmen teddy bear toss

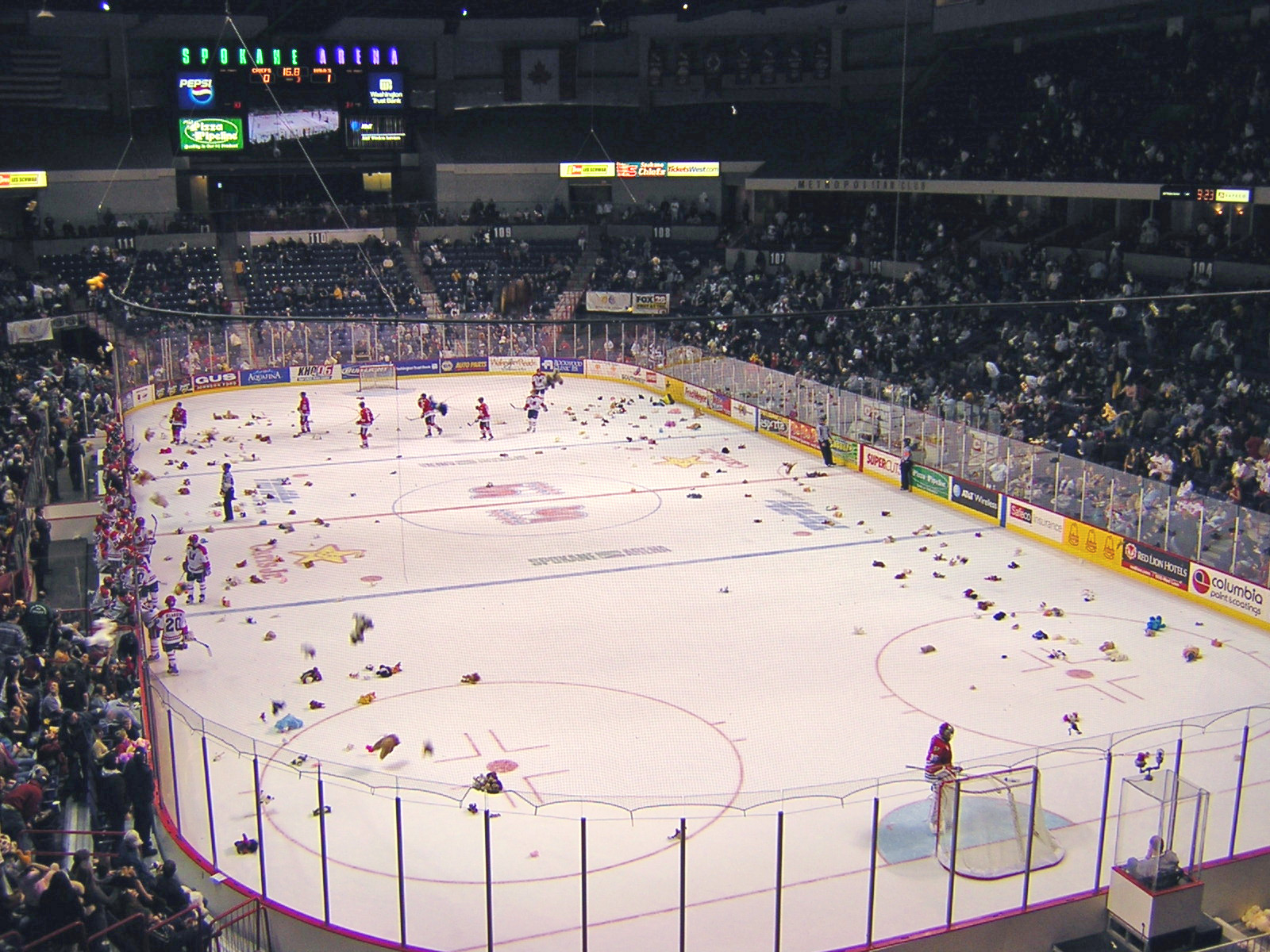
2006 Spokane Chiefs teddy bear toss

The Calgary Hitmen set a then record of 28,815 stuffed toys in a single game, on December 6, 2015 at Scotiabank Saddledome, then collected a record of 29,935 stuffed toys in a single game, on December 3, 2018. The annual event has collected almost 350,000 bears in Calgary as of early December 2018.

On December 3, 2017, the Hershey Bears collected 25,017 stuffed animals. In the following season, Hershey beat the previous mark by collecting 34,798 stuffed animals on December 2, 2018. The event also inspired philanthropists in Hershey to pledge cash donations per toy collected. On December 1, 2019, the Hershey Bears set a record of 45,650 stuffed toys collected in a single game; tossing and collecting the stuffed animals held up the game for 40 minutes. The toys were split among 40 central Pennsylvania charities. The Hershey Bears collected 52,341 stuffed animals on January 22, 2022, claiming a new record for an ice hockey game, after the team did not host teddy bear toss games in 2020 and 2021 due to the COVID-19 pandemic. In January 2023, the Hershey Bears broke their previously set record when they collected 67,309 stuffed animals to be donated to 35 local charities. On January 7, 2024, the Hershey Bears claimed a new record of 74,599 stuffed bears. In the following season, the Hershey Bears set a new record by collecting 102,343 stuffed toys on January 5, 2025, and have collected more than 566,000 stuffed toys since in 2001.

=== Around the world ===
The teddy bear toss spread to Australia on June 28, 2014 at Medibank Ice house in Melbourne. The Melbourne Ice collected 306 toys as part of the Canada Day celebration events.

On December 27, 2017 Luleå HF brought the tradition to Sweden, with a 3–1 over Mora IK. Bears were donated to a hospital in Södra Sunderbyn, the Woman's Journal in Lulea, and other charities.

Several teams in the Elite Ice Hockey League in the United Kingdom organize an annual "Air the Bear" night to collect toys for local charities at Christmas.

== Other sports ==
The teddy bear toss spread to Italian basketball and made its Lega Basket Serie A debut in 2014.

Australian soccer team Newcastle Jets held its inaugural teddy bear toss in December 2019.

In February 2023, supporters of Beşiktaş J.K. in the Turkish football Süper Lig, threw stuffed animals onto the pitch to be donated to surviving children of the 2023 Turkey–Syria earthquake. In October 2023, Polish football club Jagiellonia Białystok claimed a new world record of 109,407 stuffed animals tossed onto their field.
