= Sunderby Hospital =

Hospital in Södra Sunderbyn, Sweden

- Region Norrbotten
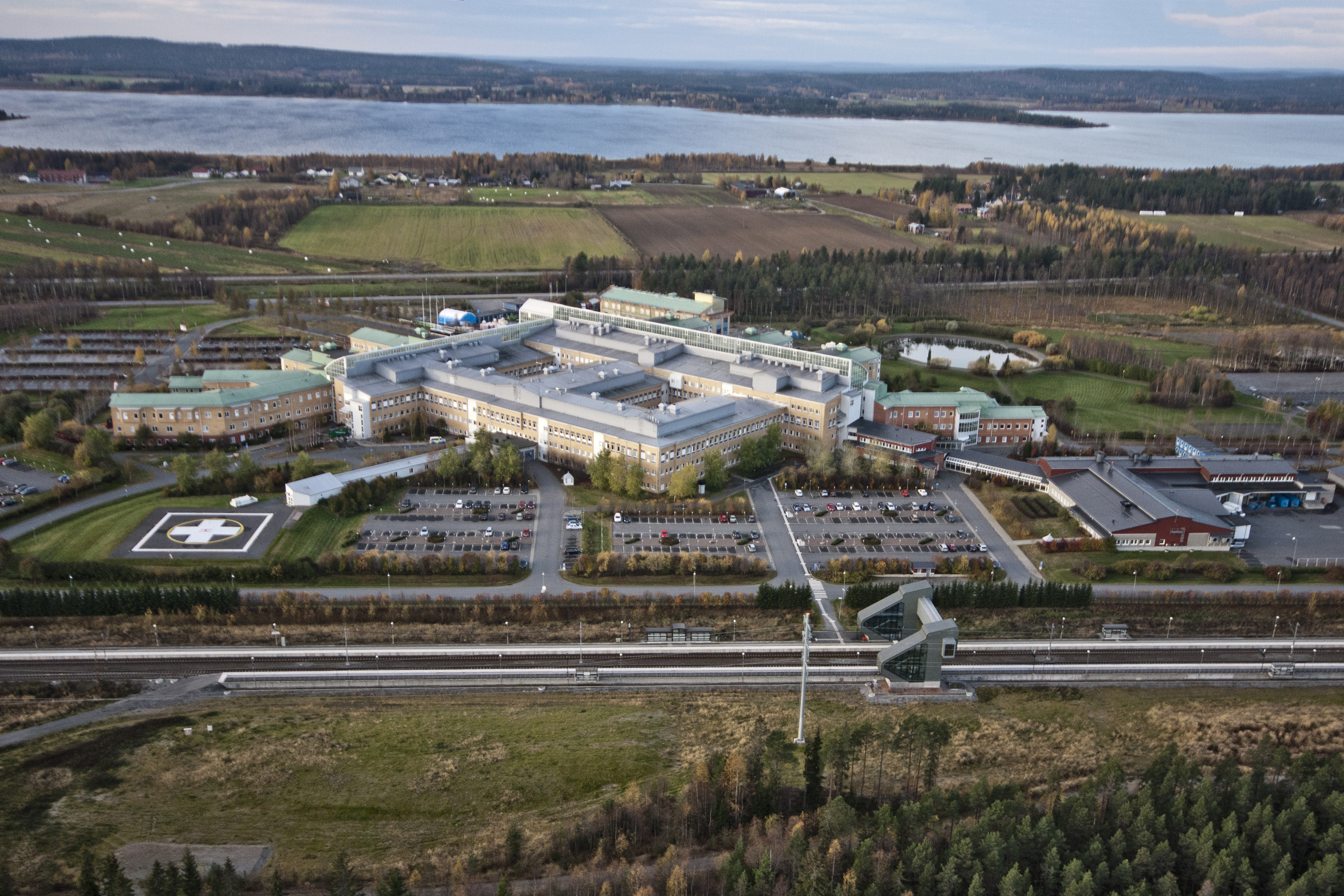
- Aerial photo of the hospital in 2013

Geography
- Location: Sjukhusvägen 10; Södra Sunderbyn, Sweden
- Coordinates: 65.672222°N 21.9325°E

Services
- Emergency department: Yes

Helipads
- Helipad: Yes

History
- Opened: 1 November 1999; 26 years ago

Sunderby Hospital (Swedish: Sunderby sjukhus) is a public hospital located in Södra Sunderbyn, Norrbotten County, Sweden. Managed by Region Norrbotten, it has approximately 380 beds and 2,500 employees. It operates an emergency department with a helipad in close proximity. It has the busiest maternity ward north of Uppsala and, along with Gällivare Hospital, provides the only maternity services in Norrbotten County.

The hospital was conceived in the late 20th century as a strategic merger of existing hospitals in Luleå and Boden. Site selection provoked intense political conflict; the current location in Sunderbyn was narrowly selected in 1993 as a political compromise. The hospital was inaugurated on 1 September 1999. A programme was introduced in 2011 to train medical students at Sunderby. It was named the second-best medium-sized hospital in Sweden by Dagens Medicin for 2012. However, the hospital has also faced scrutiny from the Health and Social Care Inspectorate (IVO) for staffing and bed shortages, as well as alleged issues with patient safety.

== History ==
=== Background and opening (1999) ===
Sunderby Hospital was conceived in the late 20th century in response to rising costs, including those associated with referring patients south to the University Hospital of Umeå. Through the 1980s, healthcare in the region was split between the large, specialist Boden County Hospital (originally established as a military hospital due to its protected, inland location) and a smaller one in the larger city of Luleå. KG Holmqvist and Toivo Hofslagare, both Social Democratic county councillors, advocated for merging the facilities, on the basis of consolidating resources, modernising technology, and reducing reliance on substitute physicians. While there was general agreement on the concept of a merger, site selection triggered an intense regional conflict between interests in Luleå versus those in Boden. Although an official county investigation initially recommended expanding the existing hospital in Boden, political leadership favoured a new construction. Representatives from Luleå wanted a site near the Luleå University of Technology, while those from Boden sought to retain the hospital in their municipality. In April 1993, Anders Sundström proposed Södra Sunderbyn as a compromise. Situated approximately 15 km (9.3 mi) from Luleå and 20 km (12 mi) from Boden, the site was intended to maintain party unity. On June 11, 1993, the county council narrowly approved the compromise site in a 39 to 32 vote. Construction began in 1995. Designed by architect Tage Isaksson, it was built to cover an area of 78,000 m^{2} (840,000 sq ft), with patient rooms designed to provide views of the surrounding nature. Construction of Sunderby Hospital finished slightly under budget at approximately 1.6 billion SEK. It was inaugurated on 1 September 1999 by Queen Silvia.

=== 2000–2019 ===
An April 2003 strike by the Municipal Workers' Union led to the cancellation of non-essential surgeries at Sunderby. In January 2011, the hospital's telecommunications was affected by an unknown person cutting their fibre-optic cable. They also began accepting medical students to a programme at the hospital in 2011. In October 2012, they began construction on a patient hotel. It opened on 1 September 2014. The same year, there was a boil-water advisory due to a broken pipe.

In November 2017, Sunderby Hospital experienced a care-capacity crisis due to a shortage of inpatient beds. Dozens of patients who were otherwise medically ready for discharge remained in hospital because municipal care placements were unavailable, resulting in overcrowding on wards. Meanwhile, patients requiring emergency orthopaedic surgery were unable to be admitted, leading the hospital to cancel all planned operations and transfer some patients to Piteå Hospital and Gällivare Hospital. Hospital representatives attributed the situation primarily to delayed discharges, as well as a long-standing shortage of nursing staff. The Health and Social Care Inspectorate (IVO) criticised Sunderby's emergency department in 2018, alleging risks to patient safety.

=== COVID-19 and other challenges (2020–present) ===
The hospital experienced significant strain during the COVID-19 pandemic. By 13 March, the region requested assistance from the Swedish Armed Forces. On March 23, the hospital instituted a separate emergency department entrance, for patients with suspected COVID-19. The next day, Region Norrbotten was granted ten extra respirators by the National Board of Health and Welfare. The first death in Norrbotten was reported on 25 March at Sunderby Hospital. Psychiatric triage was moved outside on 1 April, to a tent organised by the Armed Forces. Much of Norrbotten's COVID PCR testing took place at Sunderby's laboratory. The hospital added more parking spaces during the pandemic due to increased private vehicle use.

The director of Region Norrbotten, Anna-Stina Nordmark Nilsson, resigned in 2022 after being asked to step down in an open letter by 176 doctors published in Norrbottens-Kuriren. A major point of contention was the region's decision to fly 200 patients to Stockholm for surgery. The hospital was threatened with a 10 million SEK fine by the IVO in March 2022, after the organisation found waiting times in the emergency department to be too long. Eight months later, the IVO criticised working conditions at Sunderby's maternity ward, citing excessive workloads, long working hours, and insufficient recovery time for midwives. They warned that the conditions posed a risk of illness or injury. Region Norrbotten was ordered to reduce workload pressures or risk a fine of 1.2 million SEK. At the time, overtime at the ward had totalled approximately 2,000 hours among 47 midwives through June of 2022. The following autumn, Region Norrbotten announced the hospital would be renovated at a cost of 740 million SEK, although major shortages of staff and beds were also noted.

== Facilities and operations ==
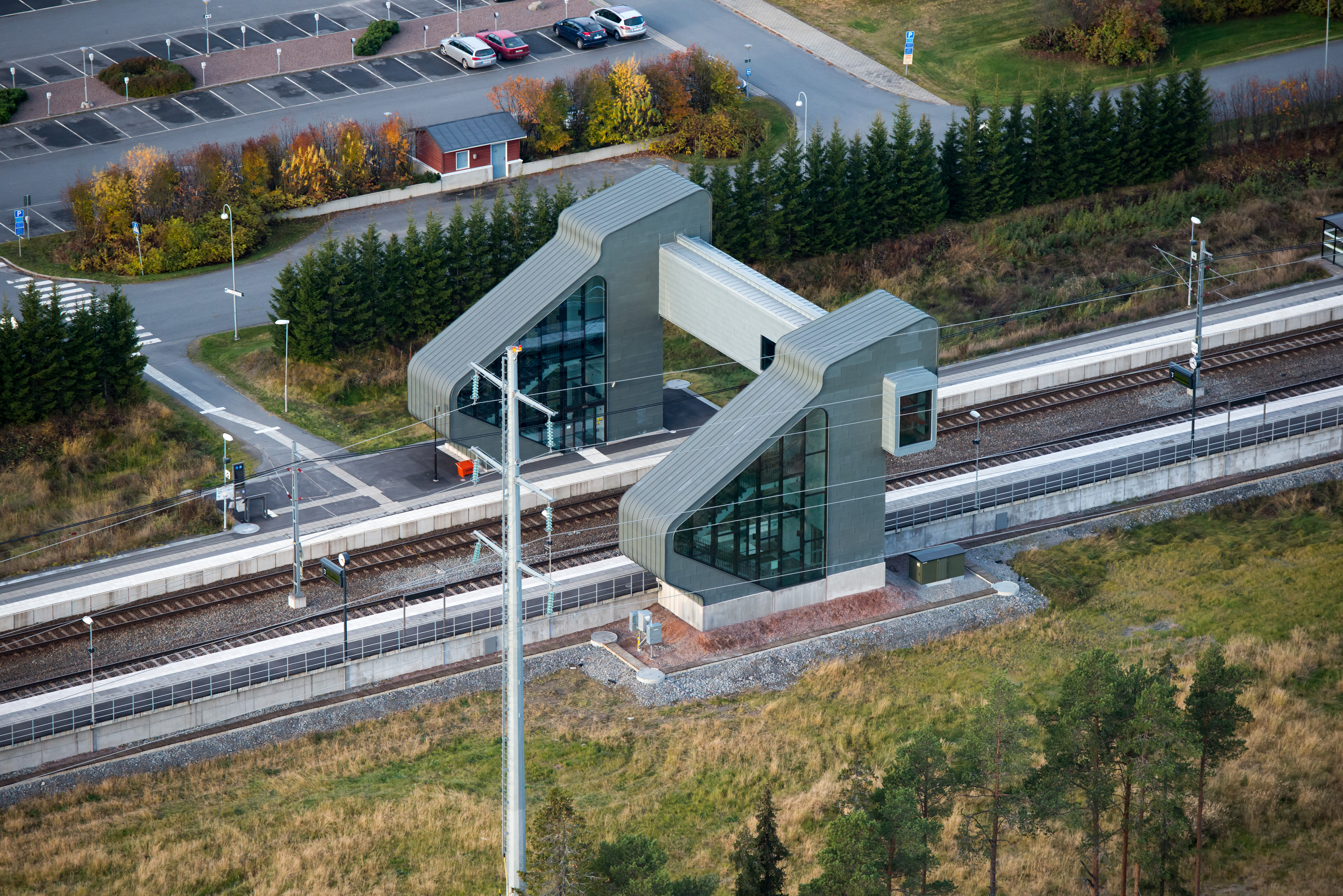
Sunderby Hospital station in 2013

The hospital has approximately 380 beds and 2,500 employees. They have the busiest maternity ward north of Uppsala. Sunderby and Gällivare Hospital have the only maternity facilities in Norrbotten County. Sunderby had a new helipad inaugurated on 18 November 2021, in closer proximity to the emergency department compared to the previous one. This change was estimated to save thirty minutes per patient transport. The hospital has a nuclear medicine department, which in 2018 provided 1,800 examinations and performed 60 radiopharmaceutical treatments. Sunderby has a laboratory medicine programme, which is involved with transfusion medicine, clinical chemistry, clinical microbiology, clinical pathology, and cytology.

Besides medical care, the hospital also has other amenities. Its kitchen prepares and delivers approximately 31,000 meals per day. There is a hospital chapel, as well as a silent reflection room which is open 24/7. The on-site patient hotel can accommodate up to 140 people.

Sunderby Hospital station is an accessible train stop on the Main Line Through Upper Norrland, connecting it to Luleå, Boden, Haparanda, Kiruna, and Umeå.

== Recognition ==
It was named the second-best medium-sized hospital in Sweden by Dagens Medicin for 2012. In 2017, Sunderby was ranked among the top six hospitals in the country for treatment of patients with heart attacks.

== See also ==
- List of hospitals in Sweden
