= Kiruna Hospital =

Hospital in Kiruna, Sweden

- Region Norrbotten
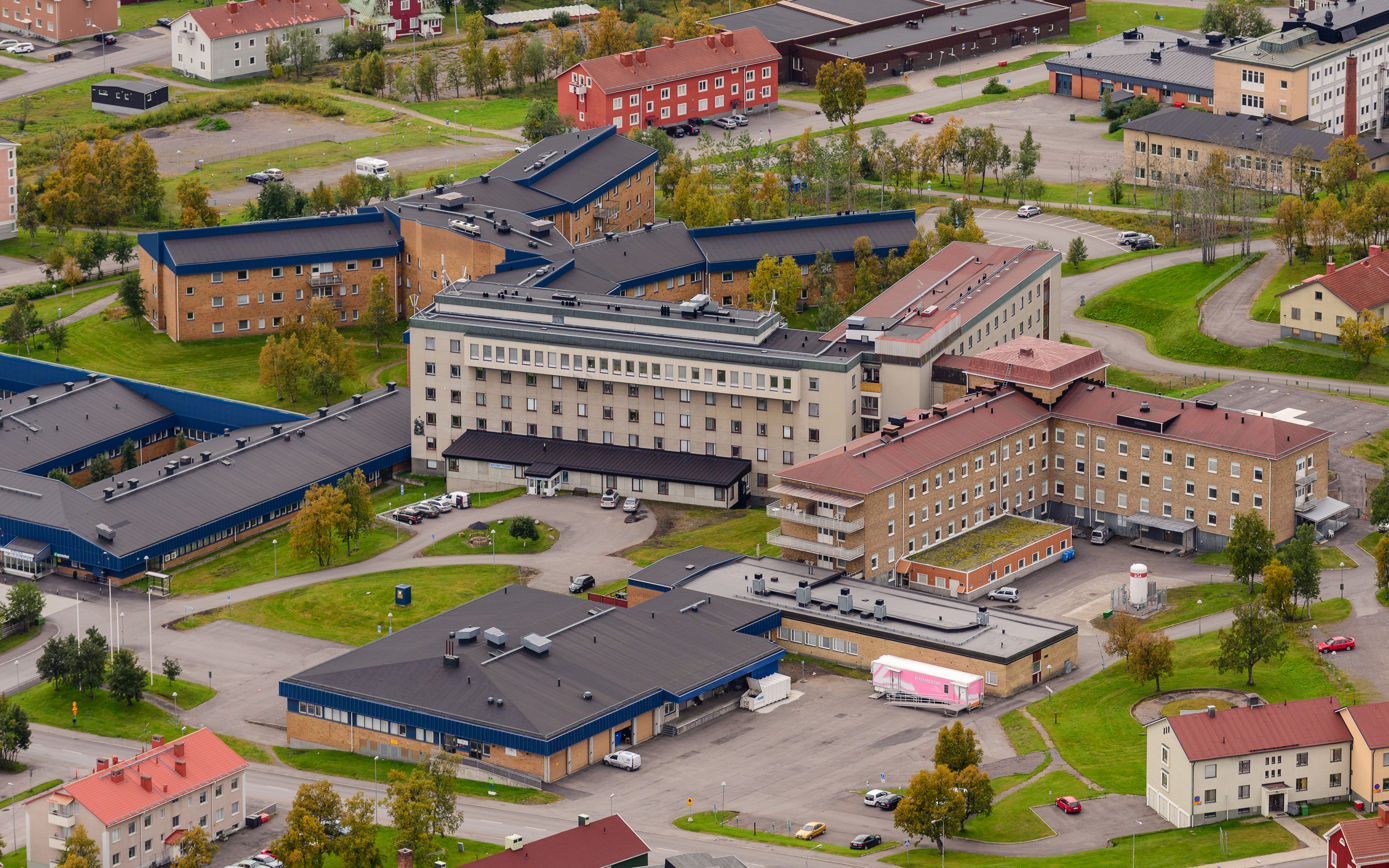
- Aerial photo of the hospital in 2017

Geography
- Location: Thulegatan 29; Kiruna, Sweden
- Coordinates: 67.849972°N 20.238333°E

Services
- Emergency department: Yes
- Beds: 45

Kiruna Hospital (Swedish: Kiruna sjukhus) is a public hospital in Kiruna, Norrbotten County, Sweden. It is the country's northernmost hospital and one of five in Norrbotten County. Managed by Region Norrbotten, it has 45 beds and employs a staff of about 500 people. The hospital is expected to be relocated due to ground subsidence caused by LKAB's mining operations.

== History ==
In 1902, railway doctor A. Skantze submitted a proposal for Kiruna to get its own epidemic hospital. The following year, the King in Council ordered construction on a hospital and pharmacy; the then-municipality of Juckasjärvi received a loan of 55,000 SEK to conduct the work. The epidemic hospital opened around 1906.

During the German invasion of Norway in April 1940, contemporary reporting from Dagens Nyheter identified the hospital in Kiruna as a regional medical receiving point. In the aftermath of the Battles of Narvik and combat along the nearby Norwegian-Swedish border at Bjørnfjell, medical treatment was provided to wounded Norwegians and Germans.

Kiruna Hospital introduced joint emergency services for both medical and surgical departments in 1959, a move considered revolutionary at the time. In 1966, the hospital implemented a new rotation system which would reduce physician on-call frequency from every fourth day to every ninth day. Beginning in the early 1990s, services at Kiruna Hospital began to be scaled back in favour of centralising the county's healthcare at Sunderby Hospital. The hospital's maternity ward and emergency surgery department closed in 2001 and 2011, respectively. The status of the hospital was a primary driver in the 2018 Norrbotten regional election. Widespread dissatisfaction with healthcare travel distances—120 km (75 mi) to Gällivare Hospital for childbirth and up to 700 km (430 mi) for certain diagnostic tests—led to a strong showing for the new Health Care Party, which received approximately 70% of the vote.

In January 2024, Kiruna Hospital was reported to be at risk of becoming unusable within a few years due to ground subsidence caused by LKAB's mining operations. According to documents presented by LKAB to the Swedish government, parts of the existing hospital would need to be decommissioned by 2025, which would have potentially required healthcare services to be provided in temporary facilities such as barracks. Architectural plans for the new hospital were presented in November 2025; construction is scheduled to begin in 2027 for an expected completion date of 2030–2031.

== Facilities and operations ==
Kiruna Hospital is Sweden's northernmost. Operated by Region Norrbotten, it is one of five hospitals in the county and serves a catchment area of the Kiruna Municipality. It has 45 beds and approximately 500 employees.
