= McGuire Apartments =

Demolished high-rise building in Seattle, Washington

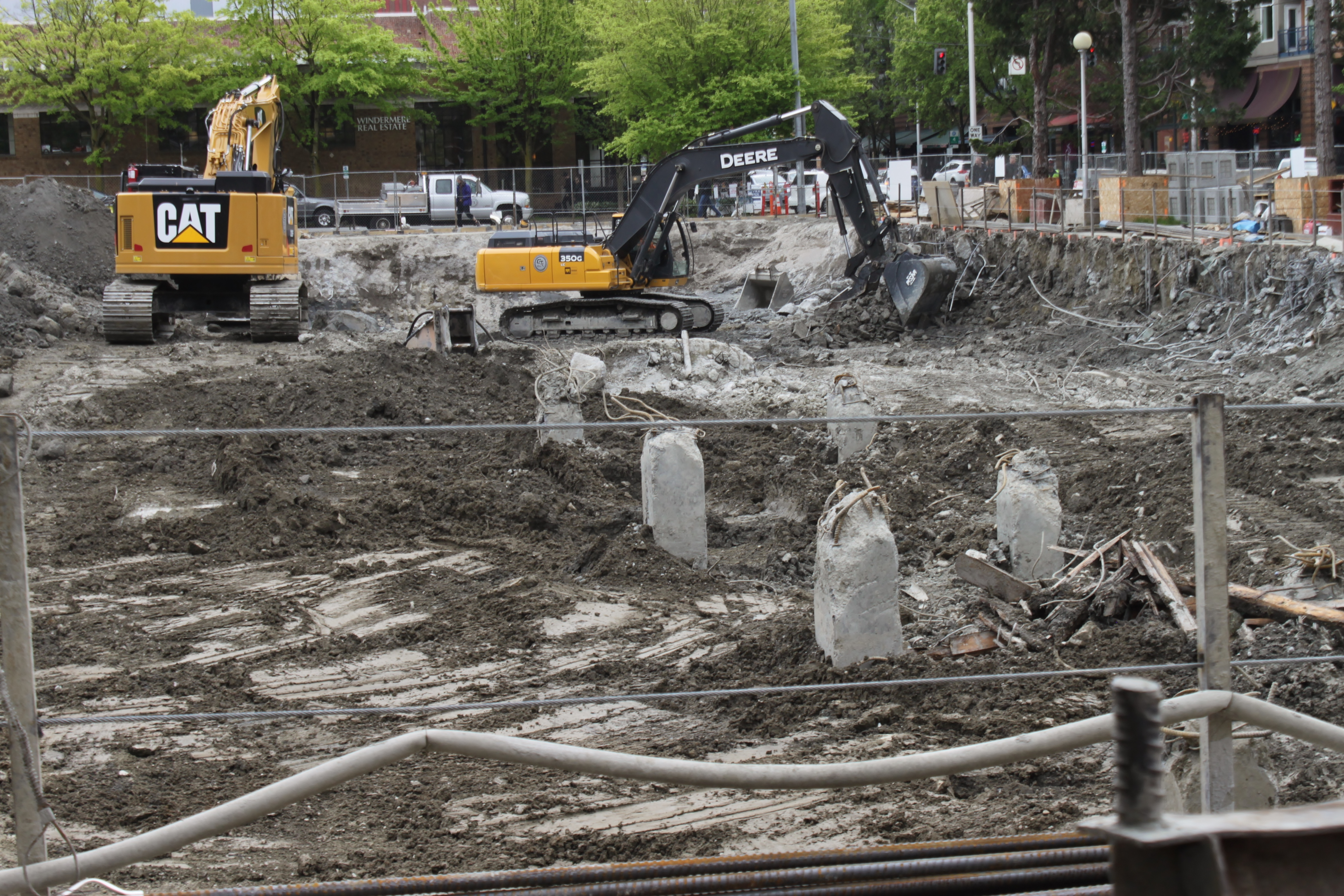
- Remnants of the McGuire Apartments building during new construction on the site in 2017

- Location within Downtown Seattle

General information
- Status: Demolished
- Type: Apartment building
- Location: 210 Wall Street; Seattle, Washington
- Coordinates: 47°36′56.9″N 122°20′53.4″W
- Opened: April 2001
- Closed: 2010
- Demolished: 2011–2012
- Cost: $32 million
- Owner: Harbor Properties

Height
- Architectural: 242.78 feet (74.00 m)

Technical details
- Floor count: 25

Design and construction
- Architecture firm: Hewitt Isley Architects
- Structural engineer: ABKJ
- Main contractor: McCarthy Building Companies
- Known for: Tallest building in Seattle to be demolished

Other information
- Number of units: 272 apartments

The McGuire Apartments was a 25-story apartment building in the Belltown neighborhood of Seattle, Washington. The $32 million, 272-unit building opened in 2001, but was closed in 2010 after the discovery of major structural flaws and corrosion that forced evacuation and demolition. The building was demolished in 2011 using heavy machinery and filled with dirt. The site was re-excavated in 2017 for a new residential building that opened in 2019.

== History ==
The McGuire Apartments opened in April 2001 at a cost of $32 million, a joint venture by the Carpenters Union Local 131 and Harbor Properties. The 272-unit tower was built by McCarthy Building Companies as part of a wave of condominium and apartment development in the Belltown neighborhood during the late 1990s. The building also had a five-story, above-ground parking garage topped by a private park.

As early as 2004, issues with the building's exterior and water-proofing were discovered and reported to the municipal planning department. By 2010, the building was clad in scaffolding during repairs by the owners to the cracked exterior. During inspection of the building's frame in 2008, the building's owners discovered corrosion of cables and load-bearing cable ends in the post-tensioned concrete floors of the building, due to inadequate painting and the use of an improper type of grout that failed to keep water out. Repairs were estimated at $23 million in 2008, but this climbed to over $80 million by early 2010, forcing the building's owners to announce plans in April to demolish the nine-year-old building.

The announcement forced 244 residents and several businesses to vacate the building by the end of 2010. A floor-by-floor demolition of the McGuire Apartments building, as opposed to the implosion method used for Seattle's Kingdome in 2000, was approved by the City of Seattle in March 2011. Contractor Lease Crutcher Lewis began salvage and demolition work on April 4, 2011, with the garage leveled beginning the following month. The demolition was completed in early 2012, and claimed the life of a construction worker during work on the 22nd floor in September 2011.

City-hired inspectors were initially found to be negligent in failing to report the problems during construction and later inspections, and the incident led to reforms in the standards for post-tensioned concrete construction in building codes.

== Replacement ==
After the completion of demolition work in 2012, reverting the building site into a surface parking lot, advisers to the pension firm that owns the site recommended building a new apartment building. A food truck stand and farmers' market were among ideas for temporary use of the site, but were rejected in favor of building as soon as possible. In June 2015, national developer AvalonBay Communities filed permits to explore a 24-story, 320-unit building on the site. AvalonBay bought the property for $24 million in April 2016 and hired architectural firm Ankrom Moisan to design the new building. A revised design was unveiled in September 2016, featuring 283 units arranged in three setback sections (ranging from 7 to 24 stories in height), allowing for the addition of rooftop sections. Construction on the new $147 million building began in 2017 and was completed in 2019, opening at the Avalon Belltown Towers. A 50-room part of the building was furnished into a small hotel operated by WhyHotel.

== See also ==
- List of tallest voluntarily demolished buildings
