= Sunderby SK =

Swedish football club

- Full name: Sunderby Sportklubb
- Ground: Byvallen; Södra Sunderbyn; Sweden
- Chairman: Linus Sjömark
- League: Division 4 Norrbotten Södra
Home colours	Away colours

Sunderby SK is a Swedish football club located in Södra Sunderbyn.

== Background ==
Sunderby SK currently plays in Division 4 Norrbotten Södra which is the sixth tier of Swedish football. They play their home matches at the Byvallen in Södra Sunderbyn.

The club is affiliated to Norrbottens Fotbollförbund.

== Season to season ==
Season	Level	Division	Section	Position	Movements
1997	Tier 5	Division 4	Norrbotten Södra	6th	
1998	Tier 5	Division 4	Norrbotten Norra	3rd	
1999	Tier 5	Division 4	Norrbotten Södra	1st	Promoted
2000	Tier 4	Division 3	Norra Norrland	8th	
2001	Tier 4	Division 3	Norra Norrland	9th	
2002	Tier 4	Division 3	Norra Norrland	9th	Relegation Playoffs
2003	Tier 4	Division 3	Norra Norrland	4th	
2004	Tier 4	Division 3	Norra Norrland	10th	Relegated
2005	Tier 6	Division 5	Norrbotten Mellersta	4th	
2006*	Tier 7	Division 5	Norrbotten Mellersta	2nd	
2007	Tier 7	Division 5	Norrbotten Norra	3rd	
2008	Tier 7	Division 5	Norrbotten Norra	2nd	Promoted
2009	Tier 6	Division 4	Norrbotten Norra	6th	
2010	Tier 6	Division 4	Norrbotten Norra	4th	
2011	Tier 6	Division 4	Norrbotten Södra	10th	Relegated

* League restructuring in 2006 resulted in a new division being created at Tier 3 and subsequent divisions dropping a level.
