= WhyHotel =

WhyHotel is an alternative hospitality service provider that creates pop-up hotels. The company uses yet-to-be-leased units in new apartment buildings as fully furnished hotel suites. As such, the company does not own any real estate listings.

== History ==
WhyHotel was founded in January 2017 by real estate developers Jason Fudin and Bao Vuong.

The company's first pop-up hotel was a pilot program from January to May 2017 which included 50 empty units at an apartment building in Pentagon City, Virginia, owned by owned by Vornado Realty. WhyHotel then spun off of Vornado Realty and became an independent, venture-backed startup in the summer of 2017.

The company received $3.9 million in seed funding in June 2018, and $20 million in Series B funding in December 2019.

In 2018, WhyHotel opened pop-up hotels in Baltimore and Washington, D.C.

he following year, in 2019, WhyHotel opened pop-up hotels in Ballston, Virginia in April 2019, Seattle in September 2019, and Tysons, Virginia in December 2019. In 2020, the company has opened a pop-up hotel in Houston and announced new locations in Maryland, and Arlington.

In May 2019, WhyHotel announced a new business arm called Hospitality Living, which aims to deliver flexible use home and hotel buildings constructed by WhyHotel. The company aims to construct the first of this type of building in 2022.
