= Pop-up restaurant =

Temporary restaurant

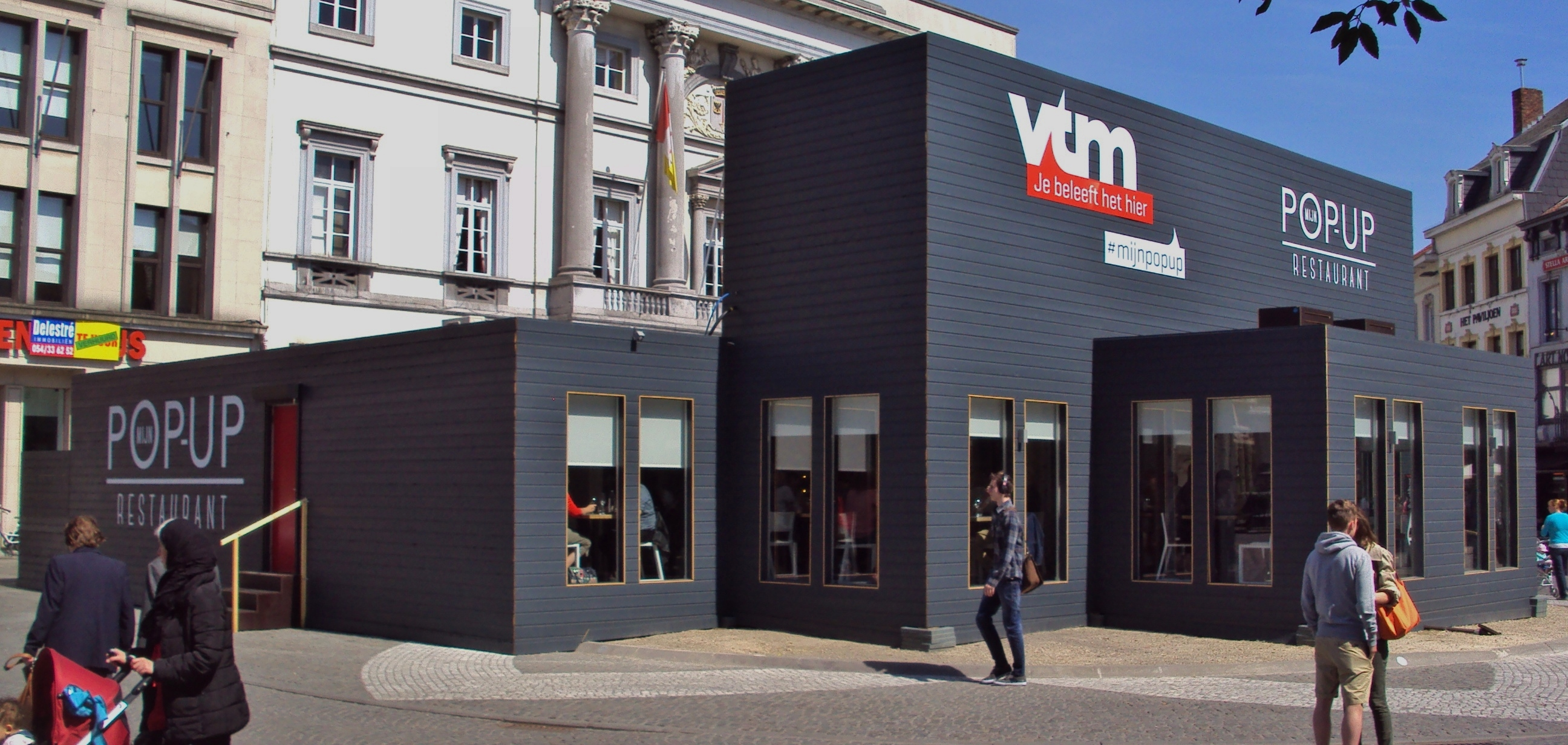
A pop-up restaurant in Belgium

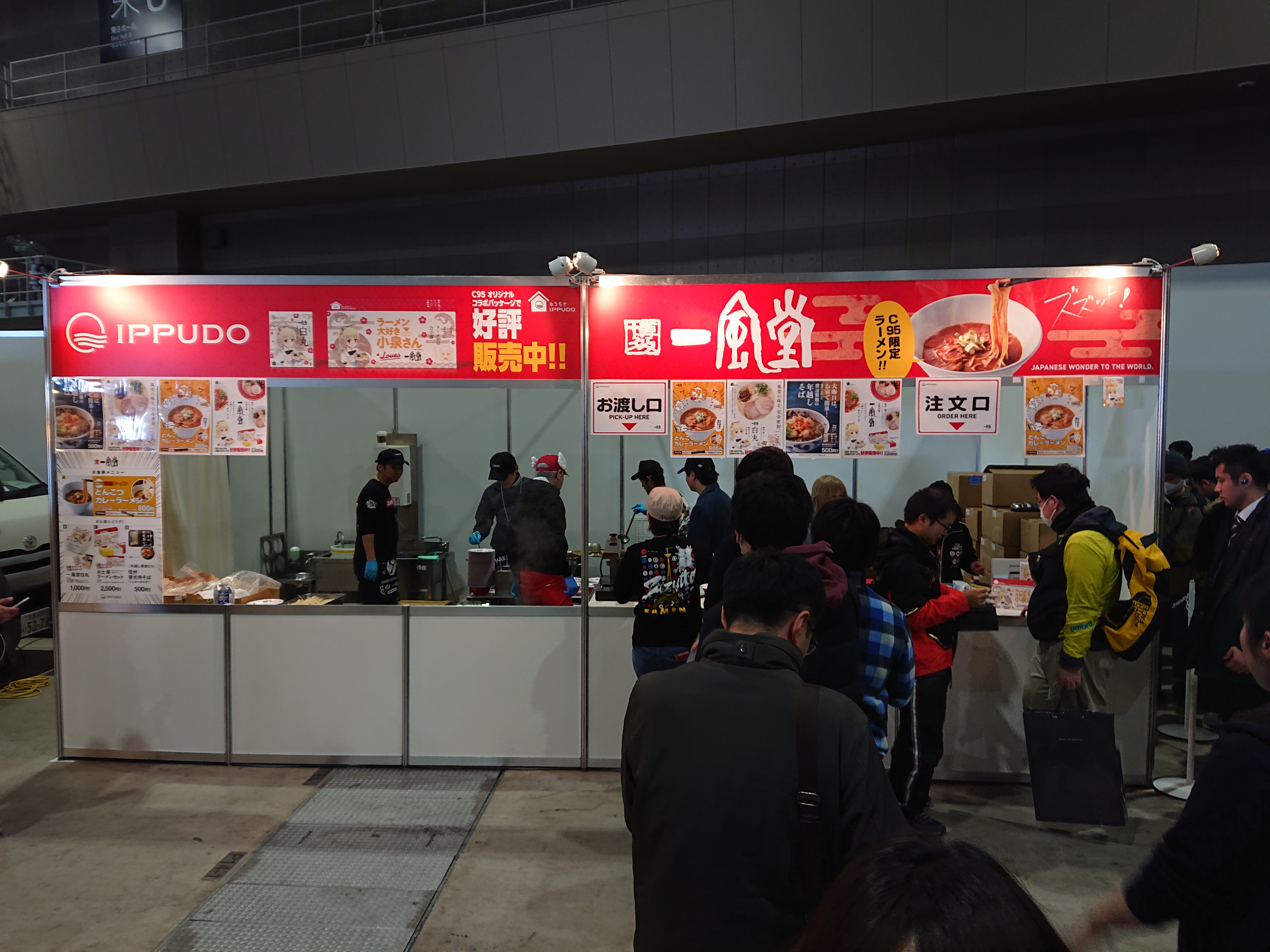
An Asian pop-up restaurant

A pop-up restaurant is a temporary restaurant. These restaurants often operate from a private home, former factory, existing restaurants or similar space, and during festivals. Various other names have been used to describe the concept of setting up a restaurant without the typical level of up-front costs, such as guerrilla diners and underground supper clubs.

== Description ==
Pop-up restaurants have been popular since the 2000s in Britain and Australia, but they are not a new phenomenon. Pop-up restaurants have existed in the United States and Cuba. Diners typically make use of social media, such as the blogosphere and Twitter, to follow the movement of these restaurants and make online reservations.

Pop-up restaurants, like food trucks, are an effective way for young professionals to gain exposure of their skills in the field of hospitality as they seek investors and attention pursuant to opening a restaurant or another culinary concept.

Pop-up restaurants have been seen as useful for younger chefs, allowing them to utilize underused kitchen facilities and "experiment without the risk of bankruptcy". By 2013, this restaurant style had gained steam and prevalence in larger cities thanks in part to crowd-funding efforts that offered the short-term capital needed to fund start-up costs.

Notable entrepreneurs, chefs, and restaurateurs have opened pop-up restaurants:

- Jason Atherton
- Camille Becerra
- Thomas Keller
- Pierre Koffmann
- Ludo Lefebvre
- Stephen Starr
- Alain Ducasse

== Restaurant Day ==
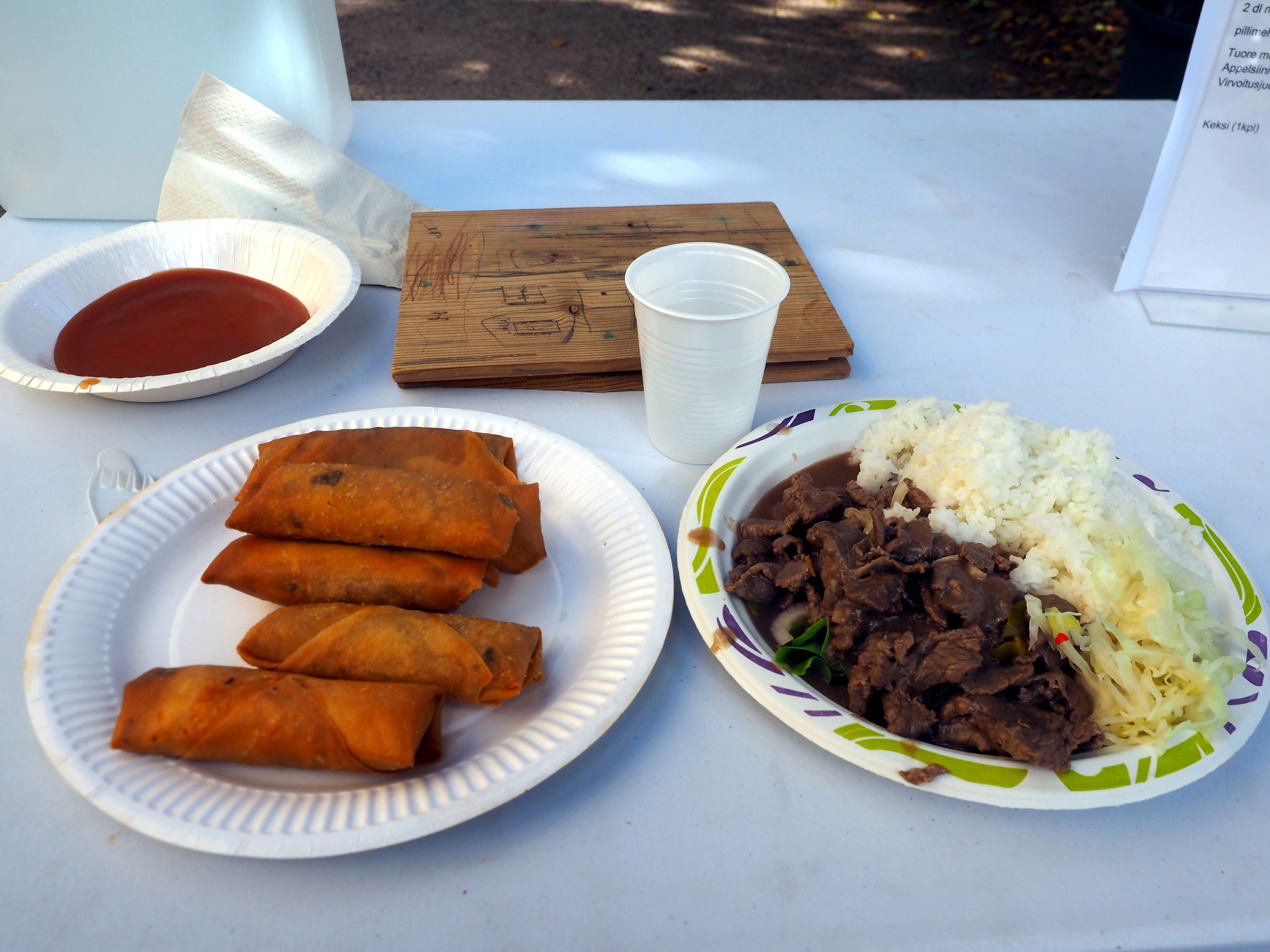
Cambodian cuisine at a pop-up restaurant in Lauttasaari, Helsinki, Finland during Restaurant Day in 2018

Differently from traditional pop-up restaurants, which tend to financially support their restaurateurs as means of profit or living, the Restaurant Day event (Finnish: Ravintolapäivä) invites people to put up their own restaurants, cafés, and bars for one day only. Founded by Timo Santala, Olli Sirén, and Antti Tuomola in Helsinki, Finland, in 2011, the movement is intended to promote and celebrate food culture.

== See also ==
- Flash mob
- Pop-up exhibition
- Pop-up hotel
- Pop-up retail
