= Health and Social Care Inspectorate =

Logo

The Health and Social Care Inspectorate (Swedish: Inspektionen för vård och omsorg, IVO) is a Swedish government agency under the Ministry of Health and Social Affairs. The agency was founded on 1 June 2013. The agency controls supervision and control over healthcare as well as social services.

== The Health and Social Care Inspectorate (Ivo) report January 2023 ==
In January 2023 the IVO announced the first part of the conclusions of a national inspection of Swedish healthcare launched in January 2022, in which it inspected 27 hospitals, covering all 21 of the country’s regional health authorities.

Peder Carlsson, the unit chief at Ivo who led the inspection said:

“Patients do not get an acceptable amount of food, fluids or basic treatment, and according to our information, patients can be required to lie for several hours in their own faeces and urine,” Swedish news agency TT quoted Carlsson as saying.

“This is a terrible situation, totally unacceptable and it is particularly striking that this is happening in the hospitals we have in our country.”

“We have examples of patients with sepsis who are sent home instead of being admitted and given antibiotics,”

In its conclusions, the inspectorate said that the shortage of hospital beds had led to a situation where patients are cared for in hospital corridors, waiting rooms and other places not designed for healthcare, and where patients are cared for in a hospital unit that lacks the specific competence to treat their illness or injury.

The inspectorate has threatened four separate hospitals, Uppsala University Hospital, Sundsvall Hospital, Sunderby Hospital and the Central Hospital in Växjö, with fines if they do not take urgent measures to improve the situation.

Sweden’s health minister Acko Ankarberg Johansson on Thursday morning ordered the National Board of Health and Welfare to develop proposals for a “national plan for developing competence in healthcare”.
