= Pop-up exhibition =

Temporary art exhibition

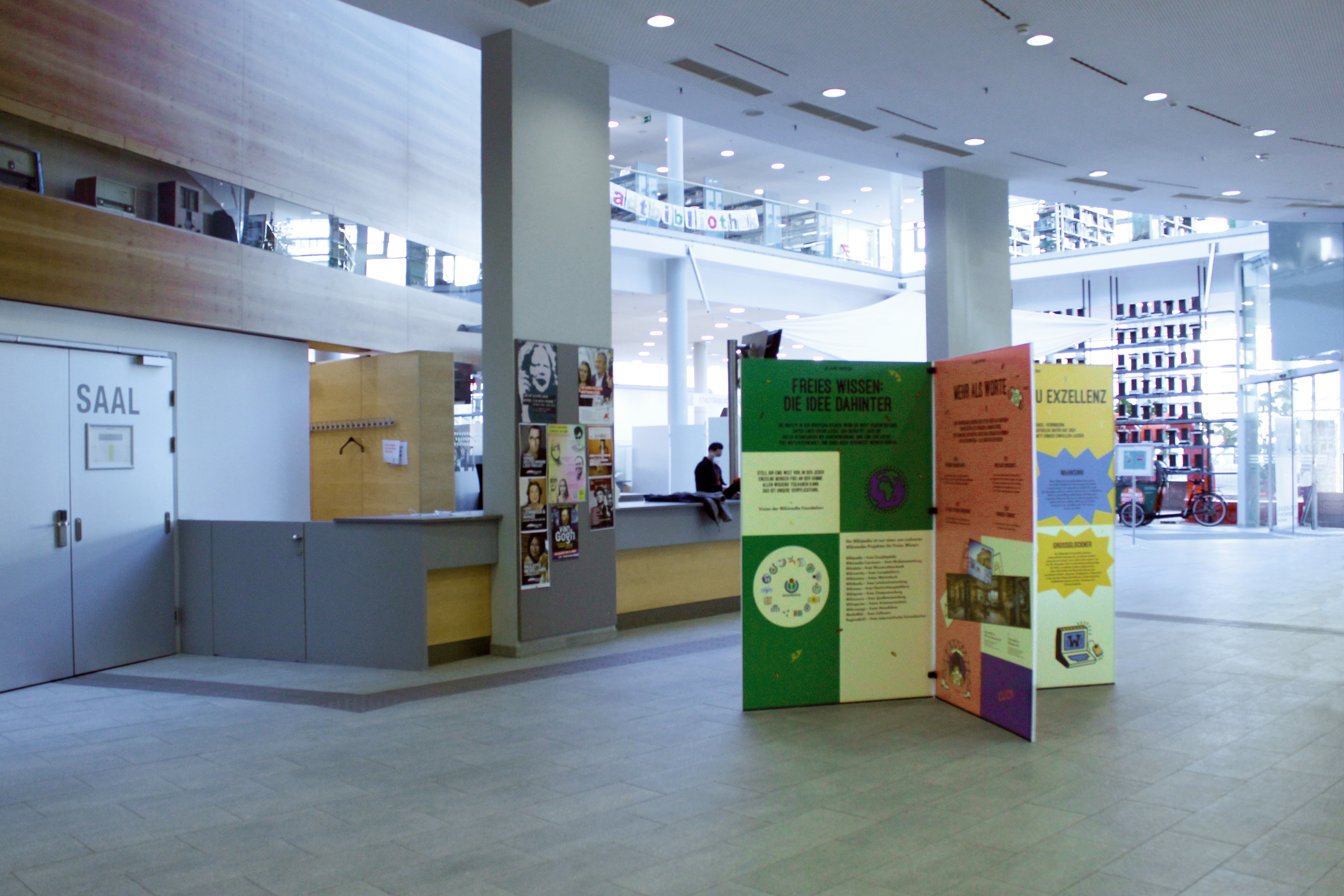
A pop-up exhibition in the lobby of a public library

A pop-up exhibition is a temporary art event, less formal than a gallery or museum but more formal than private artistic showing of work. The idea began in 2007 in New York City where space for exhibiting artistic work is very limited. Although the idea originated from New York City, pop-up exhibitions occur all around the world. A recent example is Banksy's Dismaland, which ran from August to September 2015.

Pop-up exhibitions usually allow for a more immersive experience for the visitor. Unlike most traditional museums, some pop-up exhibitions encourage the viewer to interact with the artwork. With this interaction, the exhibition allows for a "public curation," where the artwork is sometimes dependent on the user interaction. Many pop-ups are also intended to open up conversation and discussion about relevant social issues.

Pop-up exhibitions allow the artist to interact with viewers from different regions of the world, and give viewers the opportunity to engage with the art in person. Pop-up exhibitions are beneficial for artist to spread their art around the world.

Some pop-up exhibits (such as the Museum of Ice Cream) are erroneously called pop-up museums, but do not fit the International Council of Museums definition of a museum.

== See also ==
- Pop-up hotel
- Pop-up restaurant
- Pop-up retail
