= Gällivare Hospital =

Hospital in Gällivare, Sweden

- Region Norrbotten
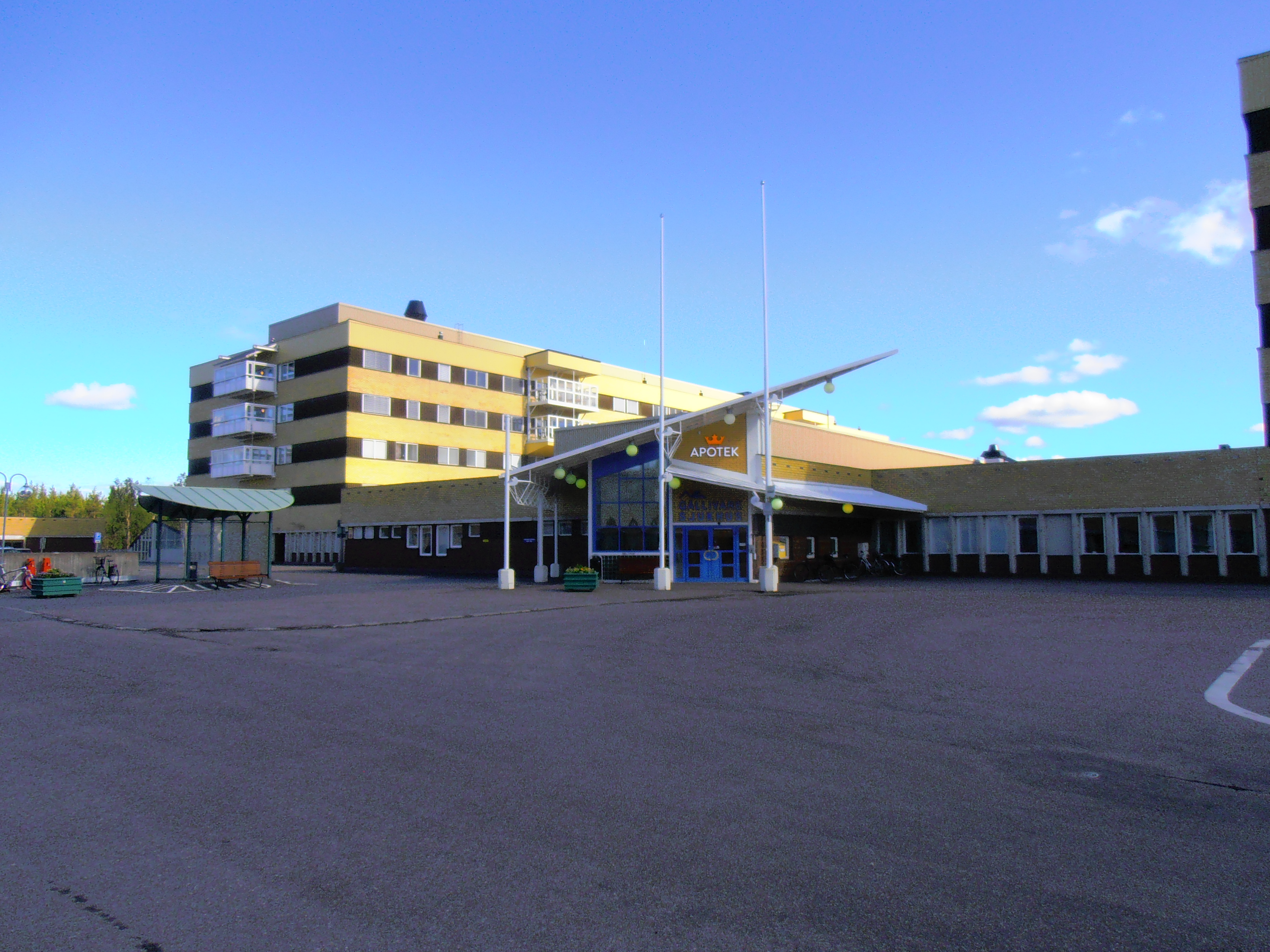
- Hospital exterior in 2016

Geography
- Location: Källgatan 14; Gällivare, Sweden
- Coordinates: 67°7′51″N 20°41′15″E

Services
- Emergency department: Yes

Gällivare Hospital (Swedish: Gällivare sjukhus) is a public hospital located in Gällivare, Norrbotten County, Sweden. Managed by Region Norrbotten, it has approximately 100 beds and employs a staff of about 700 people. The hospital serves a catchment area covering four municipalities in northern Sweden: Gällivare, Kiruna, Jokkmokk, and Pajala. The hospital provides comprehensive medical services including an emergency department, intensive care unit, maternity ward, paediatric clinic, and various other specialised departments. It operates one of only two maternity facilities in Norrbotten County, alongside Sunderby Hospital. The city of Gällivare also serves as a hub for air medical services in northern Sweden, with the county's ambulance helicopter based at Gällivare Airport and staffed by hospital physicians and nurses.

== History ==
Gällivare Hospital was described as Sweden's northernmost in 1938. On the morning of 20 November 1939, there was a collision in Nattavaara between a passenger train and a freight train carrying ore. Doctors from Gällivare Hospital travelled to the scene by railbus to provide first aid. Patients were then transported to the hospital for further care.

In August 1944, Gällivare physician Åke Lindbom gave an interview with Dagens Nyheter about the lack of beds in Norrland for tuberculosis (TB) patients. He said that due to a lack of space, patients were dying in corridors and children with TB were being sent back to overcrowded homes. Later that month, it was announced that the county council had approved a 2.8 million SEK grant for Gällivare Hospital. Renovation plans included the addition of 190 beds, as well as dividing the hospital into two departments — one medical and one surgical. Doctor Torsten M. Bechman also pushed back on the idea that Northern Sweden had poorer medical facilities than Southern Sweden. Gällivare was able to receive patients via helicopter ambulance by 1954, as they admitted a patient from the village of Kaltisluokta, near Stora Lulevatten.

A new, modernised hospital was inaugurated in Gällivare on 9 April 1973 by Sven Aspling, the Minister for Health and Social Affairs. At a cost of 140 million SEK, it had taken five years to build. At the time of opening, the new hospital was reported to have 524 beds and 600 employees. The hospital was severely damaged by a major fire that broke out in the hospital's entrance hall on Good Friday in 1978, spreading rapidly and producing heavy smoke. The paediatric, obstetric, surgical and medical wards were evacuated. As the hospital's lifts were inoperable, staff were forced to carry or drag patients down stairways on their mattresses. Although the fire service initially brought the blaze under control, a secondary fire on the roof continued burning after midnight. The fire caused extensive damage, destroying the entrance hall and associated facilities, including the cafeteria and auditorium, while water damage disrupted the hospital's telephone exchange and kitchen operations.

In 2006, Jan Minde, orthopaedist at Gällivare Hospital, presented the results of a study identifying a rare form of pain insensitivity now known as Hereditary sensory and autonomic neuropathy type V (HSAN V). Also known as Norrbotten hereditary pain insensitivity, the people afflicted with the disease were noted to be concentrated around the Gällivare area.

Gällivare was cited in Dagens Nyheter as the first Swedish locality outside of the major cities where COVID-19 had spread extensively by June 2020. The pandemic strained both the hospital and its ambulance services. In March 2021, non-urgent procedures were cancelled to manage the strain; a third of all patients at Gällivare hospitalised with COVID-19. The children's ward was temporarily closed for two weeks, from 4–17 July 2022, due to an acute staffing shortage. Patients were transferred nearly 250 km (160 mi) to Sunderby Hospital.

== Facilities and operations ==
The hospital maintains approximately 100 beds and employs a staff of about 700 people. Managed by Region Norrbotten, it serves a catchment area in northern Sweden that includes four municipalities: Gällivare, Kiruna, Jokkmokk, and Pajala. There is an emergency department, intensive care unit, maternity ward, paediatric clinic, and various other specialised departments. Gällivare and Sunderby operate the only maternity facilities in Norrbotten County. A new palliative care unit with four beds was inaugurated at Gällivare in 2006. Besides medical care, the hospital also has a restaurant and café.

The city is a central hub for air medical services in northern Sweden, with Gällivare Airport hosting the base for the county's ambulance helicopter. The air ambulance is staffed with two pilots, a physician from Gällivare Hospital, and a nurse. It covers all of Norrbotten as its catchment area, over a fifth of Sweden as a whole. As of 2011, it responded to about 500 calls a year.

== Recognition ==
It was named the fifth-best medium-sized hospital in Sweden by Dagens Medicin in 2020.
