= Queen's Medical Centre =

- Nottingham University Hospitals NHS Trust
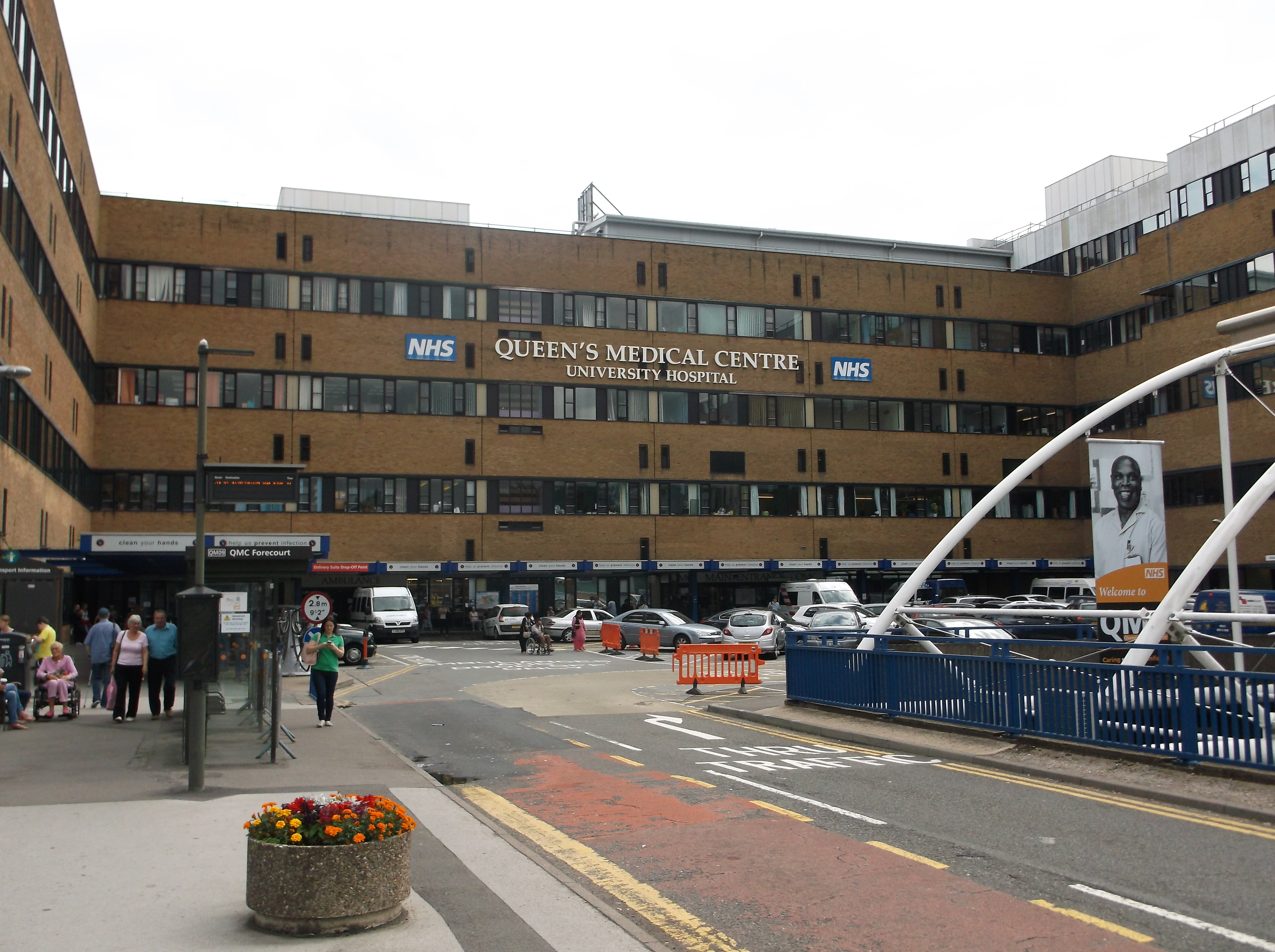
- Main entrance off Derby Road

- Shown in Nottinghamshire

Geography
- Location: Derby Road, Nottingham, NG7 2UH, England
- Coordinates: 52°56′36″N 1°11′08″W

Organisation
- Care system: NHS
- Type: Teaching
- Affiliated university: University of Nottingham

Services
- Emergency department: Major Trauma Centre – (Adult and Children)
- Beds: 1,300

History
- Founded: 1977

Links
- Website: www.nuh.nhs.uk

The Queen's Medical Centre (locally known as QMC, Queen's Med or Queen's) is a teaching hospital situated in Nottingham, England. Until February 2012, when it was surpassed by the Royal London Hospital, it was the largest hospital in the United Kingdom, though it remains the largest major trauma centre in England. It is managed by Nottingham University Hospitals NHS Trust.

== History ==
In 1964 Health Minister Anthony Barber announced in Parliament that Nottingham had been selected for a new teaching hospital and medical school, with 1,200 beds and an annual intake of 100 students.

=== Design and construction ===
Legal delays with the purchase of the 43-acre site meant that building work did not commence until May 1971. The new hospital was designed by the Building Design Partnership, and was built by Taylor Woodrow Construction, at a cost of £25 million, initially for the medical school and for one-third of the hospital.

It was the first purpose-built teaching hospital in the UK. It was officially opened by Queen Elizabeth II on 28 July 1977, and admitted its first patient in 1978. Lack of funding became a serious problem after 1979, and slowed the commissioning of later phases of the hospital. It was well into the 1980s before the project was completed.

=== Operation ===
Prince Charles had a three hour bone graft operation, under general anaesthetic, on 1 September 1990, after a broken arm had not healed, with surgeons John Webb and Chris Colton carrying out the procedure. On 1 April 2006, the Queen's Medical Centre NHS Trust, that had previously run the hospital, merged with the Nottingham City Hospital NHS Trust to form the Nottingham University Hospitals NHS Trust. In April 2012, QMC was designated as the East Midlands Major Trauma Centre.

== Facilities ==
The hospital has more than 1,300 beds and employs more than 6,000 people. It has a busy accident and emergency unit, and is the primary destination of the Lincolnshire & Nottinghamshire Air Ambulance, for seriously injured patients. In 2016–17, there were 195,782 emergency attendances. It is the East Midlands' main hospital for acute cases. The QMC site also contains the University of Nottingham Medical and Nursing Schools, Mental Health Wards and the privately run Nottingham Treatment Centre.

The Nottingham Children's Hospital was founded in 1869 in Russell House. Nursing staff were drawn from the Sisters of St Lucy which led to it being given the unofficial name "St Lucy's". In 1899 it moved to larger premises at Forest House, donated by the lace manufacturer Thomas Birkin. In 1978, the occupants became the first in-patients of QMC when they were moved to the hospital's current location in East Block. The hospital cares for about 40,000 children up to 18 years old each year. It has 116 beds. On 17 August 2020 Nottingham Children's Hospital (along with NUH Sexual Health Services) received the American Nursing Credentialing Centre (ANCC) Pathway To Excellence designation in recognition of nursing excellence. It was the first Children's Hospital in Europe to receive this designation.

== Transport ==
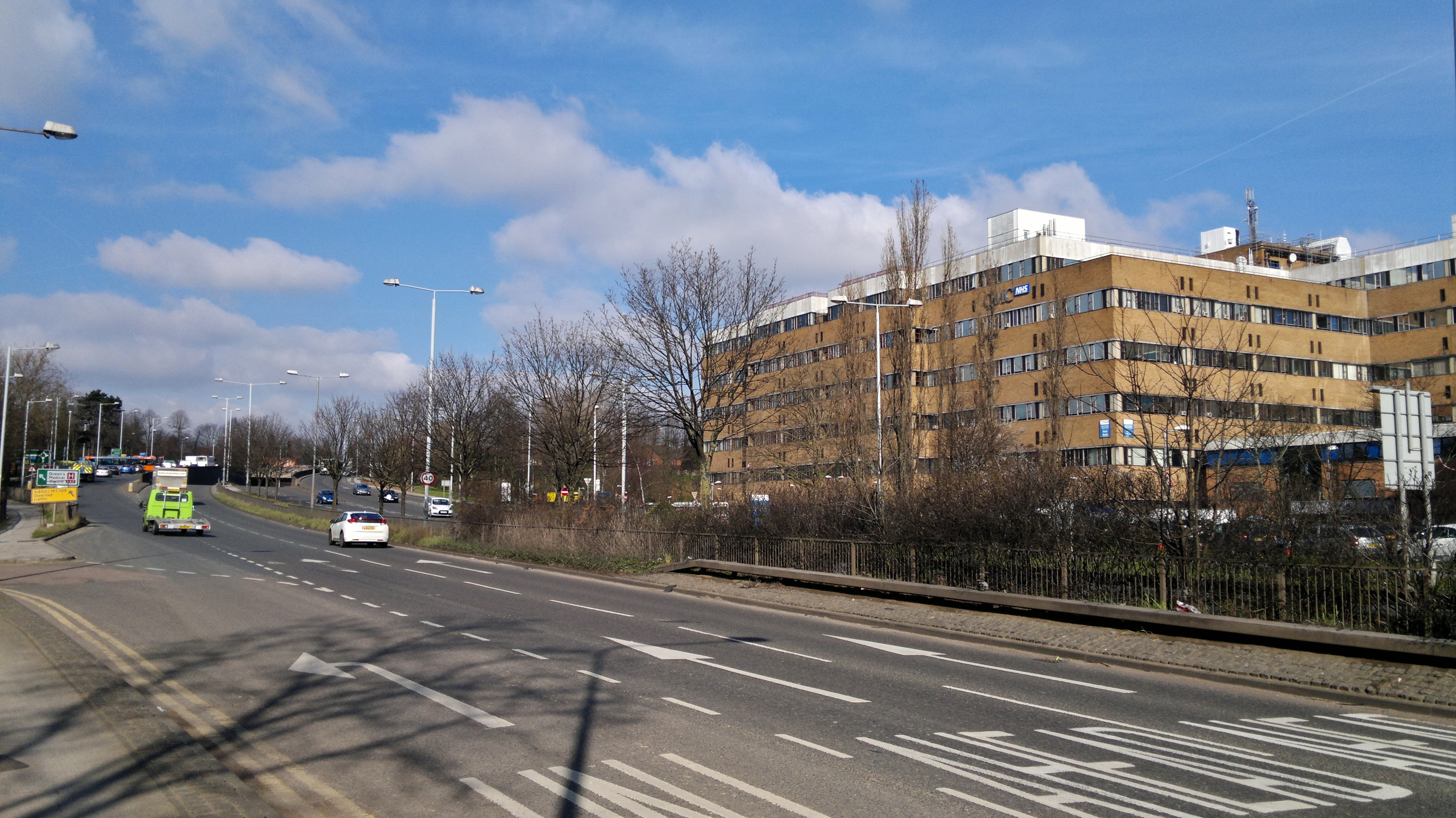
The QMC seen from the north west behind the A52 ring road locally known as Clifton Boulevard

The hospital is situated at the junction of the dual-carriageway Nottingham Ring Road (A6514) and the east–west A52 and A6200. There is a Medilink bus service, which connects Queen's Drive (Park and Ride) with Queen's Medical Centre, Wilkinson Street (for park and ride) and Nottingham City Hospital. Trent Barton’s indigo, i4, Red Arrow (From Derby Road) and Skylink Nottingham (From Abbey Street) and Nottingham City Transport's Grey Line 53, 54, 55 (From Clifton Boulevard [Southbound], Forecourt [Northbound]) and Orange Line 34, 35 and 36 (From Derby Road) bus services.

The Queen's Medical Centre tram stop, on line 1 of the Nottingham Express Transit, is situated between the South Block of the main hospital and the Treatment Centre. The tram connects QMC with Beeston, Nottingham Station, Nottingham City Centre, Basford, Bulwell and Hucknall. Passengers can change to Line 2 of the tram, which connects Phoenix Park (M1 Junction 26) with Clifton, at Nottingham station.

== In the media ==
The hospital is part of the long-running Channel 4 documentary series 24 Hours in A&E.

In February 2025, the Care Quality Commission started prosecuting the trust over three baby deaths in its maternity care. It was the second time the trust had been prosecuted by the CQC for maternity failings.

== See also ==
- NHS
- Nottingham City Hospital
- Nottingham General Hospital
- List of hospitals in England

== Sources ==
- Bittiner, John Bruce; Lowe, David (1990). Nottingham General Hospital - Personal Reflections (PDF). Nottingham: Special Trustees for Nottingham University Hospitals. Archived from the original (PDF) on 10 October 2018.
