= Nottingham University Academy of Science and Technology =

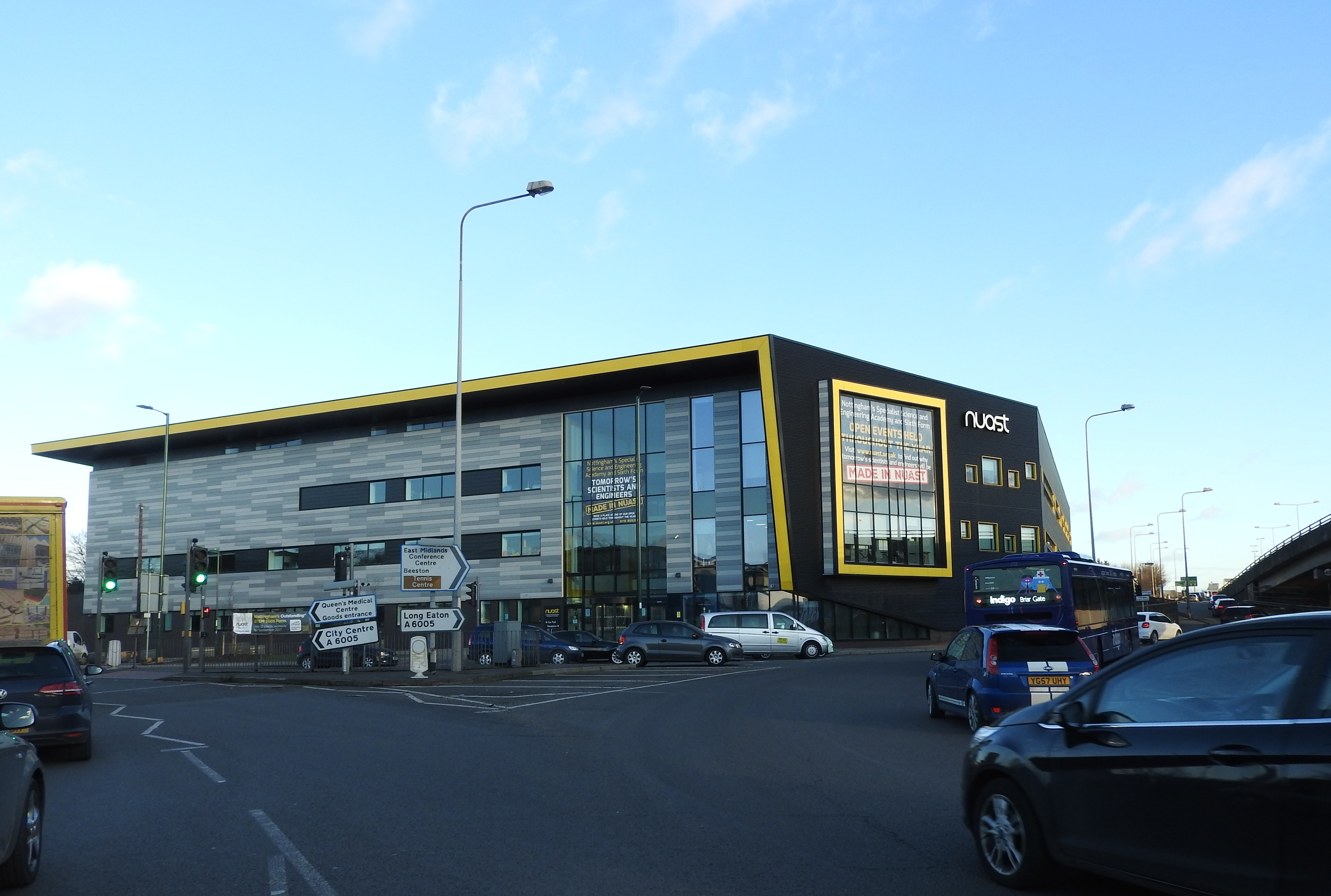

Location
- 93 Abbey Street; Nottingham, Nottinghamshire, NG7 2PL; England
- Coordinates: 52°56′26″N 1°10′51″W

Information
- Other name: NUAST
- Type: Free school
- Established: 2014
- Local authority: Nottingham
- Trust: Nova Education Trust
- Specialist: STEM
- Department for Education URN: 140984 Tables
- Ofsted: Reports
- Chair of the Local Governing Body: John Saunders
- Principal: Dave Thompson (Head Teacher)
- Executive headteacher: David Hooke
- Gender: Mixed
- Age: 11 to 19
- Affiliation: University of Nottingham
- Admissions: Year 7, and year 12
- Employer partners: Siemens, Toshiba, Rolls-Royce, SMS Electronics, Experian, Esendex, MediCity, Greene Tweed, Far Composites, Autodesk
- Website: www.nuast.org.uk

Nottingham University's Academy of Science and Technology (NUAST) is an 11 to 19 free school with STEM specialist status in Nottingham, England.

== Governance ==
The Nottingham University Academy of Science and Technology is an academy sponsored by the University of Nottingham. It is legally a trust, with a board of 11 directors and the headteacher, who is ex-officio, and a local board of governors. It was opened in 2014 as a 14 to 19 University Technical College, but transitioned into an 11-18 free school in September 2018.

The school is a member of Nova Education Trust, which provides the school with its IT systems and teachers.

== Admissions ==
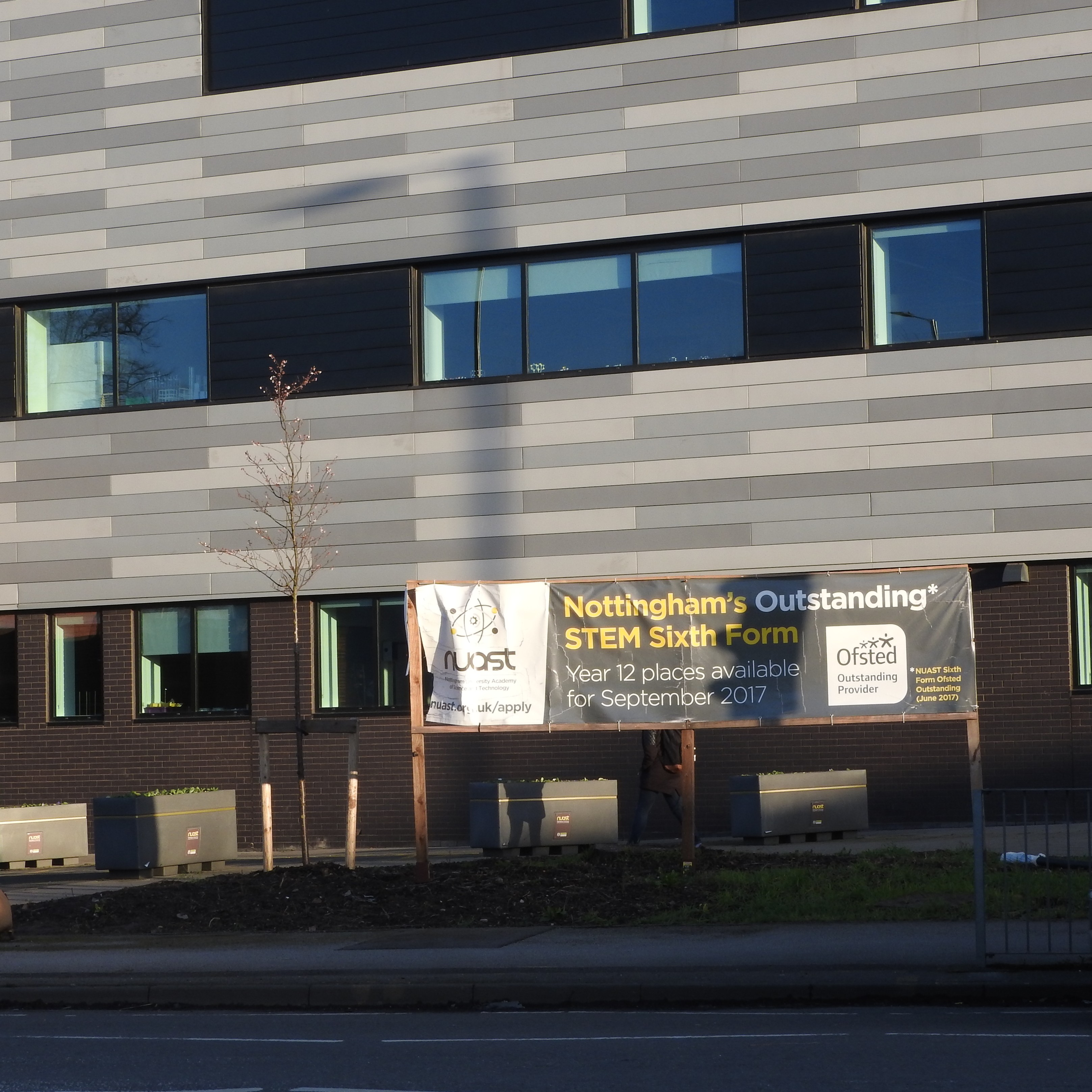
NUAST- Dunkirk, Nottingham

In September 2018, the first Year 7's were admitted to the school. Year 10 admissions remained open until 2021, after which admissions only accepted eleventh and sixth form. Applications for admission are made though the home education authority. The academy has an admissions number of 120.

== Curriculum ==
Students study a curriculum that allows for specialist study in Science, Technology, Engineering and Mathematics (STEM).

At Key Stage 4, students can study the group of subjects designated by the government as EBacc, the English Baccalaureate. These are the core academic subjects: English, Mathematics, History or Geography, two sciences and a language.

All students study mathematics, English Language, English Literature, Physics, Chemistry and Biology. Either ICT or Engineering is compulsory. Students make up the rest of their timetable by choosing two subjects from iMedia, Computer Science, Design and Technology, Business Studies, Media studies, History, Geography and Spanish.

In 2018, the college decided to not run an iMedia option for newly admitted Year 10's, instead deciding to run a Photography option instead. In addition, they added basic PE lessons to meet the Department of Education's requirements.

== Buildings ==
The academy is built on the former site of a fire station, on the A52 Clifton Boulevard in Dunkirk, Nottingham. It was designed by Bond Bryan Architects for BAM Construction. It has a gross internal floor area of 8,600 square metres and cost £10 million. It was completed in 2014.

In addition to the standard features that one finds on a secondary school, there are specialist rooms provided for the STEM subjects. For mechanical engineering, there are workshops with CNC lathes, milling machines and routers. There are bench facilities for heat treatment, welding and brazing. For electronic engineering, there is printed circuit board production and assembly equipment. The building also houses industry standard test equipment. Software is available for virtual circuit simulation and testing. Process control engineering equipment allows training in hydraulic and pneumatic control systems. The ten dedicated science laboratories are to an industrial research standard.

Across the site, there are 150 desktop PCs running Autodesk and Adobe software. Robotics is taught using Raspberry Pis and Lego Mindstorms. Programming is done in Python.

== March 2026 stabbing incident ==
On the 5th of March 2026 a 15-year-old boy stabbed another 15-year-old boy at the site. The boy was charged with causing grievous bodily harm and two counts of possession of a knife on school premises.
