= Snoozebox =

U.K. pop-up hotel company

- Industry: Hospitality
- Founded: 2011; 14 years ago
- Founder: Robert Breare
- Website: snoozebox.com

Snoozebox is a pop-up hotel company which used modified recycled shipping containers.

== History ==
Snoozebox was founded by leisure entrepreneur Robert Breare in 2011, with former Formula 1 racing driver David Coulthard as a principle.

The portable hotels are found at many motorsports events and also at the 2013 Edinburgh Festival Fringe and at Thorpe Park's Crash Pad hotel. It reported a pretax loss of £2.3 million for the six months to June 30, less than the £5.1 million loss it reported in the first half of 2013.

The company formed a partnership with Medirest to test the patient hotel model at Shrewsbury and Telford Hospital NHS Trust.

The contractor Bilfinger Salamis had planned a modular hotel, using Snoozebox's shipping containers, which would have 80 ensuite bedrooms for its skills and safety training centre in Aberdeen. The hotel was planned to be open for 5 years.

A 58-room youth hostel, a partnership between the Eden Project and the Youth Hostel Association has been built entirely of shipping containers by the company in St Austell.

Snoozebox has their flagship hotel in the Queen Elizabeth Olympic Park, London.

== See also ==
- Pop-up hotel
