= Pop-up hotel =

Temporary hotel

A pop-up hotel is a hotel which is temporary, being at a location for a short time before being moved. Such hotels may be built from pre-fabricated modules which are plugged together on site or from collapsible structures such as tents or they may be fully mobile, being built on a large vehicle. Often seen as an alternative to glamping, pop-up hotels provide accommodation for seasonal or unique events such as large outdoors music festivals, retreats, weddings or sporting events.

== Description ==
The pop-up hotel trend is part of a global approach of the hospitality industry to create authentic, ultra-local and transient experiences.

Marriott Hotels & Resorts partnered with the Coachella Valley Music and Arts Festival to offer pop-up accommodations on the grounds of the festival.

Companies such as Flash Camp and Collective Retreats are specialised in pop-up hotel offers. Snoozebox is a pop-up hotel brand that follows festivals in the UK. IceHotel in Sweden was created in 1989 and offers a seasonal fully hand-carved ice resort along the Torne River, carved fresh each year. The Pop-Up Hotel, which launched during the 2011 Glastonbury Festival, specialises in luxury pop-up hotel offers, and partnered with Historic England in 2013 for an event at the Osborne House. The Copenhagen-based architecture firm Pink Cloud worked on a new pop-up hotel concept that would capitalise on vacant office spaces. Poshtel PopUp is also a stylish brand. The London-based company Black Tomato has a service for its customers to create a pop-up hotel anywhere they want (for prices ranging from $20,000 to $160,000).

The concept of pop-up hotels is also being reused by consumer brands and pop-up retail operations. Nutella opened a hazelnut spread-themed pop-up hotel in the Napa Valley in January 2020 (Hotella Nutella).

== See also ==
- Glamping
- Escapism
- Pop-up exhibition
- Pop-up restaurant
- Pop-up retail
- Sleep pod
