= Piteå Hospital =

Hospital in Piteå, Sweden

- Region Norrbotten

Geography
- Location: Lasarettsvägen 14; Piteå, Sweden
- Coordinates: 65°18′46″N 21°29′45″E

Services
- Emergency department: Yes

Piteå Hospital (Swedish: Piteå sjukhus) is a public hospital in Piteå, Sweden. Operated by Region Norrbotten, it has approximately 90 beds and 900 employees. It has an emergency department, intensive care unit, and other specialised departments.

Founded in 1827 as the first hospital in Norrbotten County, it was rebuilt after the original burned down in 1858. Over the coming decades, Piteå Hospital expanded, with a modern 60-bed facility inaugurated in 1915. In the 1930s, the hospital played an important role in Northern Swedish polio treatment, accepting patients by air ambulance. The hospital had the only ventilator in Norrland until 1935. The hospital gained international attention in 1964 when chief physician Nils Oldby successfully re-attached a farmer's severed hand.

Piteå Hospital has since faced various challenges, including labour disputes, the closure of its maternity ward in 2002, and strain during the COVID-19 pandemic. It was also recognised as the best small hospital in Sweden by Dagens Medicin for 2013.

== History ==
=== Early years, fire, and rebuilding (1827–1915) ===
In 1827, the first hospital in Piteå, which was also the first in Norrbotten, was established. It burnt down on the night of 3 July 1858, resulting in one death and multiple injuries. In the aftermath, authorities proposed moving the hospital to Luleå, as this was also the site of the county's administrative board, but local leaders resisted. Between 1859 and 1860, it was decided to retain and rebuild the hospital in Piteå, while also establishing new ones in Luleå and Haparanda. By 1904, the rebuilt facility in Piteå had 35 beds, and two reserved for the mentally ill. Oskar Forsell, who had been chief physician in Piteå since 1897, advocated for a modern replacement, and in 1912 the county council approved a land purchase in Strömnäs. After some delays due to World War I mobilisation, a 60-bed facility, built for roughly 400,000 SEK, was inaugurated on 17 March 1915.

=== Polio, modernisation, and maternity dispute (1916–1950) ===
Piteå played an important role in polio treatment in 1930s Sweden. Before Skellefteå Hospital decided to purchase a respirator in November 1935, Piteå had the only ventilator in Norrland. Polio patients had to be flown there by air ambulance. The following year, the residence of the hospital's chief physician, Robert Ivarsson, burned down. The fire destroyed a significant volume of research material but no injuries were reported.

In 1939, plans were made for a renovation, using designs by architects Gustaf Birch-Lindgren and Bertil Höök. The modernisation and expansion effort was completed by 1943 at a cost of 860,000 SEK. However, the same year, chief physician Ivarsson also reported the hospital to the National Swedish Board of Health after an infant died of complications from an imperforate anus, which had gone unnoticed during observation. A police investigation agreed with Ivarsson's assessment, and found the hospital's care to be neglectful. The maternity ward was closed on 1 August. After a period of investigation, the Board of Health announced that nine members of nursing staff could face prosecution for failing to spot the malformation. The maternity ward issue was resolved after an agreement was made that the hospital would receive its own obstetrician.

=== Post-war milestones (1951–1999) ===
A prison clinic under construction on the hospital grounds was damaged by a fire in January 1963. A notable surgery was performed on 30 June 1964 at Piteå Hospital; chief physician Nils Oldby successfully reattached a farmer's severed hand, which was reported in The New York Times. Oldby then presented the case at a Swedish Surgical Association meeting in Umeå, with the farmer in attendance.

In 1970, approximately 100 nurses resigned from hospitals in Norrbotten, 30 from Piteå, to protest changes to the on-call system, which would result in a reduction of 400 SEK in compensation per month. During a nationwide nurses' strike in November 1995 coordinated by the Swedish Health and Medical Service Employees' Union (Swedish: Svenska hälso- och sjukvårdens tjänstemannaförbund; SHSTF), healthcare services were impacted across much of Sweden. Exemptions were granted to prevent disruptions of emergency, intensive care, and dialysis. In Piteå, nurses with radiology and surgical services participated in the strike. By the following month, they were joined by nurses in the psychiatric unit, ear clinic, eye clinic, and the general medical wards.

=== Modern challenges and COVID-19 pandemic (2000–present) ===
The maternity ward at Piteå Hospital, which had delivered 455 children in 2001, was closed the following January. Services were transferred to Sunderby Hospital.

On 14 March 2020, preparations began at Piteå Hospital for the COVID-19 pandemic, although no seriously ill COVID-19 patients had yet been reported in Norrbotten. By 26 March, the hospital had two wards for COVID-19 patients. An employee's Facebook appeal resulted in 700 donated face masks. The Municipal Workers' Union reported the hospital's emergency department for security and safety issues in December 2020. Next August, Region Norrbotten announced they would allocate 900,000 SEK to rebuild the emergency department.

== Operations and facilities ==
The hospital has approximately 90 beds and 900 employees. It has an emergency department, intensive care unit, and other specialised departments. The hospital also has other non-medical amenities — including a hospital chapel, library, restaurant, and cafeteria.

== Recognition ==
Piteå Hospital was named the best small hospital in Sweden by Dagens Medicin for 2013. It tied for second-best the following year.
