= Region Norrbotten =

Regional council of Norrbotten County, Sweden

- Regional Council
- Formation: 2017
- County: Norrbotten County
- Country: Sweden
- Website: www.norrbotten.se

Legislative branch
- Legislature: Regional Council
- Assembly members: 71

Executive branch
- Headquarters: Luleå

Region Norrbotten, formerly Norrbotten County Council, is the regional council for Norrbotten County in Northern Sweden. It is the largest employer in the county, with approximately 7,000 employees. The Region has four operational areas: healthcare and dental care, regional development, culture and education, and county-wide technical and service functions.

Unlike some other Swedish Regions, public transport is managed by a separate transport authority, Länstrafiken Norrbotten which is jointly owned by the Region (50%) and the 14 municipalities in the county (50% collectively).

The county council was transformed into a Region on 1 January 2017.

== Purpose ==
Region Norrbotten's primary responsibility is to provide healthcare, dental care, and certain educational services to the residents of Norrbotten County. The Region also has responsibilities in regional development, including financial support for culture, public transport, and small businesses.

== Municipalities ==
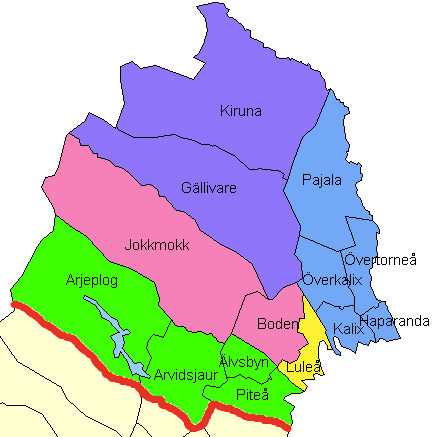
Electoral districts in Region Norrbotten for the regional council elections.

- Arjeplog Municipality
- Arvidsjaur Municipality
- Boden Municipality
- Gällivare Municipality
- Haparanda Municipality
- Jokkmokk Municipality
- Kalix Municipality
- Kiruna Municipality
- Luleå Municipality
- Pajala Municipality
- Piteå Municipality
- Älvsbyn Municipality
- Överkalix Municipality
- Övertorneå Municipality

== Organisation ==
Region Norrbotten is politically governed, with the Regional Council as the highest political body. Voters elect the 71 members of the council. The Regional Executive Board, consisting of 15 members, has executive political responsibility and prepares matters for the council.

Following a major restructuring from 2020–2022, the organisational structure changed. As of January 2023, the Region's operations include the regional director's office, a general administration with six departments (healthcare, IT/medical technology, finance and monitoring, HR, communications, and regional development), and six divisions operating across the county.

== Hospitals ==
- Gällivare Hospital
- Kalix Hospital
- Kiruna Hospital
- Piteå Hospital
- Sunderby Hospital

== Politics ==
The Swedish Social Democratic Party was the largest party in all county council elections from 1934 to 2018, often holding an absolute majority between 1970 and 1991. In 2018, the Norrbotten Healthcare Party became the largest party. However, in the 2022 election, the Social Democrats and the Left Party gained a majority and formed a coalition with the Centre Party, previously aligned with the Norrbotten Healthcare Party and the Moderates.

The Regional Executive Board consists of 15 members: 5 from the Norrbotten Healthcare Party, 5 from the Social Democrats, 2 from the Moderates, and 1 each from the Centre Party, the Sweden Democrats, and the Left Party.

== See also ==
- Norrbotten County
- County Administrative Board of Norrbotten
