= Black Tomato =

British travel agency

Black Tomato Limited
- Trade name: Black Tomato
- Formerly: The Extra Mile Limited
- Type: Privately held company
- Industry: Tour operator activities
- Founded: April 11, 2005; 21 years ago in London, United Kingdom
- Founder: Tom Marchant; James Merrett; Matt Smith
- Headquarters: London, United Kingdom
- Number of locations: 2
- Area served: Worldwide
- Website: blacktomato.com

Black Tomato is a London-based travel company founded in 2005 by Tom Marchant, James Merrett and Matt Smith. The company focuses on designing customized travel itineraries for individual clients, primarily in the high-end travel segment.

== History ==
Tom Marchant, James Merrett and Matt Smith launched Black Tomato in 2005. According to company statements, the name “Black Tomato” was inspired by a menu item encountered during travels in Eastern Europe.

In 2009, the company opened an office in Shoreditch, London. It later expanded internationally, opening an office in New York City in 2013.

== Partnerships ==
Black Tomato has collaborated with various organisations to develop themed travel itineraries. These have included partnerships with Eon Productions, associated with the James Bond franchise, and Agatha Christie Limited, related to itineraries inspired by the works of Agatha Christie.

== Awards ==
Black Tomato has been included in rankings and listings by travel and lifestyle publications. These include mentions in Conde Nast Traveler and Travel + Leisure reader surveys and specialist lists.

Additional recognition has been reported by publications such as Robb Report, Men's Health, and Modern Luxury.
