= Södra Sunderbyn =

- Location within Norrbotten Location within Sweden
- Coordinates: 65°40′N 21°57′E
- Country: Sweden
- Province: Norrbotten
- County: Norrbotten County
- Municipality: Luleå Municipality

Area
  - Total: 2.0 km^{2} (0.77 sq mi)

Population (31 December 2010)
  - Total: 2,977
  - Density: 1,486/km^{2} (3,850/sq mi)
- Time zone: UTC+1 (CET)
  - Summer (DST): UTC+2 (CEST)

Södra Sunderbyn is a locality situated in Luleå Municipality, Norrbotten County, Sweden with 2,977 inhabitants in 2010. Northeast of the community, between Highway 97 and Malmbanan (Iron Ore Line), is Sunderby Hospital; it was built in the 1990s when hospitals were merged in Luleå and Boden. The community also contains Sunderby Folk High School.

The new area of Hammaren almost joins the village to Gammelstad and is regularly visited by city buses from Luleå public transportation. It is therefore increasingly regarded as a suburb of Luleå.

== History ==
=== Sunderbyn in the beginning ===
Sunderbyn's history can be traced back 500 years. Originally there were only a few farmers in the village and these lived mostly around “Kråkberget” or “Crow Mountain”. This is the same mountain/hill where the current Sunderby Folk High School is. There are divided theories on the etymology of the name “Sunderbyn”. One theory says that the name may go back to the ancient Swedish word “Sundarby”; other theories say that Sunder means south, which would mean that the name stands for “Söderbyn”, while some theories say that the name may have Sami origin – “Suntekille”, where "kille” comes from the Finnish word "kylä", meaning village.

=== Agriculture, brickworks and timber rafting ===
Farming has long been a major factor in Sunderbyn's history. Without agriculture Sunderbyn would most likely never have been able to evolve into the current village. A brickyard was opened in 1899 in Södra Sunderbyn. “Mariebergs tegelbruk” (Marieberg's brickyard) was threatened by bankruptcy from its beginning, but survived relatively well until it finally closed in 1967. The brickyard has additionally influenced the name of the main road that runs through the whole of Sunderbyn, Hammaren and Gammelstad – “Mariebergsvägen” or The Road of Marieberg. The timber rafting operations which took place from Grundet island is also a well-known former local business; these started around 1934 and ended late in 1987.

== Sports ==
Sunderbyn has one club Sunderby SK that offers activities including ice hockey, football, skiing and basketball. In the last of these, the sports association has achieved great success in youth SM (Swedish Championship) but also in the Scania Cup. Basketball players that used to play in Sunderby SK include: Mattias Kenttä, Tommy Kurkinen, Jonas Hallberg, Jim Enbom, Stina Nilsson, Nils Nilsson, Per Nilsson, Fredrik Karlsson, William Hangasjärvi and national team players John Rosendahl and Joel Nordin.

Sundishallen, a sports hall in Sunderbyn, is a central spot for the village'sports participants. In recent years it has been possible to read in the newspapers about "Sundisparken", (Sundis park) mostly in the newspaper Norrbottens-Kuriren. This training park was meant to be "a sports mecca for young and old" in the village but when the money from the municipality did not seem to be enough, this idea had to be dropped until further notice.

== Children and leisure ==
There are three schools in Sunderbyn, two elementary schools for classes 1-6 and one for classes 7–9. The two primary schools are called Hemängsskolan and Kläppenskolan and the high school is named Kråkbergskolan. The closure of Kläppenskolan was mooted but the idea was rejected under community pressure.

=== Scouts ===
Sunderby Scoutkår (Sunderby scout-corps) is a part of the Swedish Guide and Scout Association (SSF), which currently has about 65,000 members and is one of the largest youth organizations in Sweden. The corps has members from both Gammelstad and Sunderbyn following the closure of the Gammelstad scout troop. Sunderbyns scout group sells majblommor (may flower) and 2009 they received a diploma from Queen Silvia of Sweden in a ceremony.

== Trade and industry ==
The village center includes a grocery store, as well as two restaurants.

=== Cable TV Association ===
Sunderbyn has its own CATV networks for television and internet. In 2009 the network merged with Öhns Cable TV and the new system has up to 1200 households/members. The Cable TV Association is run as a nonprofit organization. At the merger of 2009, there were also added the members of the agglomeration Gammelstad.
