= Patient hotel =

Form of accommodation for hospital patients

A patient hotel provides accommodation for patients, and often their family, who need to be close to a hospital, but do not need a hospital bed. They are usually in the grounds of a hospital, and are used by people who are recuperating or awaiting treatment.

== About ==
Patient hotels are typically separate buildings that provide mobile patients who can care for themselves a place to stay while undergoing medical and nursing interventions at a nearby hospital or health provider. Typically run by private sector companies, nurses are often employed as receptionists. Patient hotels play a critical role in vacating beds in the hospital that are needed for patients requiring a higher degree of care.

According to a study published in the Journal of Epidemiology and Community Health, guests of the hotel are most likely to be patients needing low level monitoring or simple investigations in obstetrics and gynecology, general surgery, general medicine, and geriatric medicine. 79% of the studied patients were discharged the same or following day.

Heath providers largely see the benefit of patient hotels a cost-effective alternative for care during a surgery, at roughly a third of the price for a stay in the hospital, and increase patient satisfaction due to their element of hospitality. Hotel amenities often include an on-site restaurant, lounges, parking facilities, free wi-fi, similar to a traditional 3-star hotel. What differentiates it from a traditional hotel are hospital attributes, such as increased accessibility, wired for communication with providers, and hospital-grade finishes.

== International ==
=== Scandinavia ===
In 1988, Lund University Hospital in Sweden opened the first patient hotel as a way to make room for incoming patients. Patient hotels are common in Finland, Sweden and Norway where national insurance covers a patient's stay.

The patient hotel model used in Norway began to be tested in 2014 by Medirest at Shrewsbury and Telford Hospital NHS Trust, where they have formed a partnership with Snoozebox to develop a modular design.

=== United Kingdom ===
The first in the UK was opened in 1994 at Nottingham City Hospital. The Coxa centre in University College Hospital Tampere, Finland for joint replacement makes extensive use of patient hotels and has a very high rate of day case surgery. In 2013, NHS England was reported to be considering the possibilities of using them to ease demand on hospital beds, including provision for the 30,000 patients each year who are kept in hospital despite being well enough to be discharged.

University College London Hospitals NHS Foundation Trust uses the Cotton Rooms Boutique Hotel, which is funded by the UCLH charity to house some patients, as even in central London they are less than half the cost of a hospital bed.

=== United States ===
In 1974, Ronald McDonald House Charities opened in Philadelphia. By 2021, the charity operated over 380 Houses in 60 countries which act as a place to stay for families with hospitalized children who are receiving treatment.
