= Nottingham University Hospitals NHS Trust =

NHS hospital trust

- Type: NHS trust
- Established: 2006
- Headquarters: Hucknall Road; Nottingham; NG5 1PB
- Budget: £1.36bn
- Hospitals: Nottingham City Hospital; Queen's Medical Centre
- Chair: Nick Carver
- Chief executive: Anthony May
- Staff: 16,244
- Website: www.nuh.nhs.uk

Nottingham University Hospitals NHS Trust (NUH) is one of England's largest acute teaching trusts. It was established on 1 April 2006 following the merger of Nottingham City Hospital and the Queen's Medical Centre NHS Trusts. They provide acute and specialist services to 2.5m people within Nottingham and surrounding communities at the Queen's Medical Centre (QMC) and the City Hospital campuses, as well as specialist services for a further 3-4m people from across the region.

A merger with Sherwood Forest Hospitals NHS Foundation Trust was planned, and Peter Homa, Chief Executive of Nottingham at that time took the same role at Sherwood Forest, but refused to accept responsibility for the trust's £2.5bn private finance initiative contract. In 2016 Homa stepped down from the job at Sherwood Forest and in November 2016 it was announced that the merger would not proceed.

== Campus ==
The City Hospital campus is the older of the two campuses, founded in 1903. It occupies a large 90-acre (360,000 m^{2}) site on the ring road to the north of the city centre. It provides general medical and surgical services to the local population, and is the location for many specialties such as cardiology, cardiothoracic surgery, breast surgery, plastic surgery, nephrology, oncology, urology, and infectious diseases.

QMC campus was the first purpose-built teaching hospital in the UK, and also contains The University of Nottingham Medical and Nursing Schools and Nottinghamshire Healthcare mental health wards. During the year 2008/09 a proportion of outpatient and day case patient care was transferred to the NHS Treatment Centre operated by Nations Healthcare. NUH staff have been seconded to provide a service to the organisation, but it operates independently of the trust.

The two hospitals are connected by a link bus which provides a free service for staff, and fares from £1 for patients and visitors.

In 2022 the outstanding maintenance bill was £407million, the fourth largest in the English NHS.

== Services ==
The trust is the principal provider of acute general, specialist and tertiary hospital care to the population of Nottingham, with approximately 1,663 hospital beds. Activities include general hospital services for the local population and a wide range of specialist services for regional and national patients. They provide a range of general acute and specialist services across nine clinical directorates. These are:

- Acute medicine
- Cancer and associated specialties
- Diabetic, renal and cardiovascular
- Diagnostic and clinical support
- Digestive diseases and thoracic
- Family health
- Head and neck
- Musculoskeletal and neurosciences
- Specialist support

=== Surgery ===
The trust provides a tertiary service for all surgical specialities for the surrounding counties. The Nottingham Hepatic-Biliary-Pancreatic (HPB) team for example covers Nottinghamshire, Derbyshire, Lincolnshire, and parts of Staffordshire. Queen's Medical Centre is a Level 1 major trauma centre, and covers all of the East Midlands.

=== Dermatology ===
In 2013 Circle Health won a dermatology contract from the Nottinghamshire clinical commissioning groups for services across the Trust and their Nottingham NHS Treatment Centre. Circle also runs the Nottingham Treatment Centre on the QMC site. Nottingham was previously regarded as a national centre of excellence for dermatology. In December 2014 it was announced that six of the eight consultants had left rather than transfer to Circle. It was suggested that the doctors were concerned over job stability at a private employer, and had fears that a profit-driven provider would not offer opportunities for academic research or training. The trust announced that it would stop providing acute dermatology services to new patients from February 2014. The President of the British Association of Dermatologists said this was "just one example of the many fires we are fighting across the UK to try to keep dermatology services open in the face of poorly thought-out commissioning decisions and the Government's lack of understanding of the implications of pushing NHS services into unsustainable models provided by commercially driven private providers or enterprises," The exodus of doctors left a department with too few staff to function, and put Circle under "financial pressure" because they had to pay nearly £300,000 per year each for six locum doctors, some insufficiently qualified to be on the specialist register. A report, by Dr Chris Clough of Kings College Hospital, London, called for the trust, Circle and Rushcliffe Clinical Commissioning Group to work together to solve the problem. The handling of these changes by both commissioners and providers was described as an 'unmitigated disaster'. The consultants had concerns about transferring "to an uncertain model at Circle". The consultants said the company had no experience of the highly specialist work they provided and that this would "inevitably lead to a downscaling of their ability to deliver effective training and research".

In 2019, after litigation, Circle was forced to surrender the contract for the Nottingham Treatment Centre, which has 700 staff and treats around 250,000 patients annually, to the trust.

=== Radiology ===
The trust hosts the East Midlands Radiology Consortium which runs a shared system that stores and transmits patient radiology images across the region.

== Research ==
The trust has a close partnership with The University of Nottingham and Nottinghamshire Healthcare NHS Foundation Trust across a vast range of research activities. This includes the Biomedical Research Centre with dedicated units in gastroenterology/hepatology, hearing, respiratory medicine, musculoskeletal medicine, and mental health, as well as a cross-cutting MRI theme.

Nottingham University Hospitals was one of only two national pilots for a trust-wide programme called Releasing Time to Care – the Productive Ward. The aim of this is to release nurse time from unnecessary or "wasteful" activity.

Bliss, the special care baby charity are currently funding research into the benefits to premature and sick babies of manuka honey dressings.

== Performance ==
The trust was one of 26 responsible for half of the national growth in patients waiting more than four hours in accident and emergency over the 2014/15 winter.

The trust expected to finish 2015/16 with a deficit of more than £42m as a result of changes to the NHS tariff.

It was named by the Health Service Journal as one of the top hundred NHS trusts to work for in 2015. At that time it had 11,557 full-time equivalent staff and a sickness absence rate of 3.39%. 78% of staff recommend it as a place for treatment and 69% recommended it as a place to work.

In November 2016 it was reported that the Trust planned to end its estates and facilities services contract with Carillion after nurses had been forced to clean the wards because of a shortage of 70 cleaning staff. 1500 staff dealing with cleaning, catering, laundry and linen, and security were taken back into direct employment in 2017 when the contract, worth £200m over 5 years was terminated. Carillion will continue to manage the trust's car parks.

A digitisation project which involved Swiss Post Solutions scanning 57m paper records at a cost of £5.8m, £2.7m on hardware and software; and £5.9m on deployment of the system provided by Fortrus was branded as "unsafe" by the trusts consultants in September 2017. Records were scanned into the document management system rather than entering data directly.

In March 2018 it was the tenth worst performer in A&E in England, with only 61.5% of patients in the main A&E seen within 4 hours.

Between 1 December 2018 and 3 April 2019 the trust had 15 Opel 4 alerts and on one day accident and emergency performance against the four-hour target went down to 57.2%. It finished the financial year with a £40.8m deficit.

== In the Media ==
Series three of BBC's Hospital, a documentary that follows the day-to-day running of a hospital, was filmed at the trust. Each episode shows the impact of ever-increasing demands on the NHS's services shown from different perspectives – patients, families, clinical staff and managers.

== Controversies ==
=== Maternity Care Review ===
In September 2022, an independent maternity review began into the Trust after families warned that maternity care was unsafe. 2,500 families and more than 800 staff members contributed to the review, which was led by senior midwife Donna Ockenden. The report, released in June 2026, found that different care may have altered the outcome for 260 babies, 155 who died and 105 who suffered serious brain injury due to substandard care.

The report alleged that concerns of women were often dismissed and minimised, and staff described racism leading to accusation of black women being as " too loud, too demanding". The review also found that leaders at the trust were aware of serious issues in its maternity department going back to "at least 2010", but failed to take action.

=== Mortuary Issues ===
In June 2026, it was reported that Human Tissue Authority (HTA) inspectors who had visited the trust in March 2026 had discovered eight bodies in a state of advanced decomposition due to not being transferred to a freezer within a sufficient timeframe. The inspectors concluded that the trust had "insufficient storage to meet the needs of the mortuary service".

== See also ==
- List of NHS trusts
