= Stora Lulevatten =

Lake in Norrbotten County, Lappland, Sweden

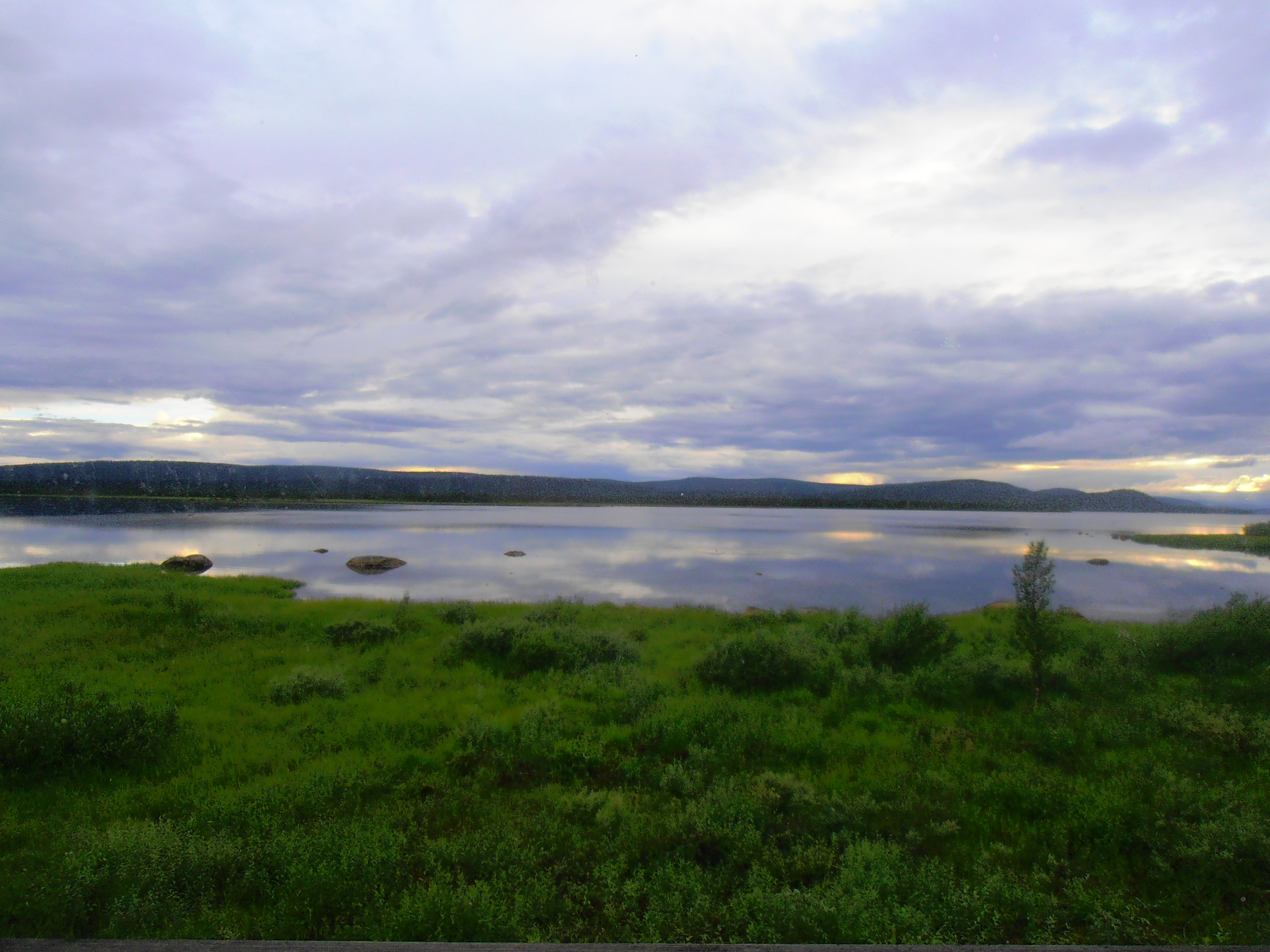

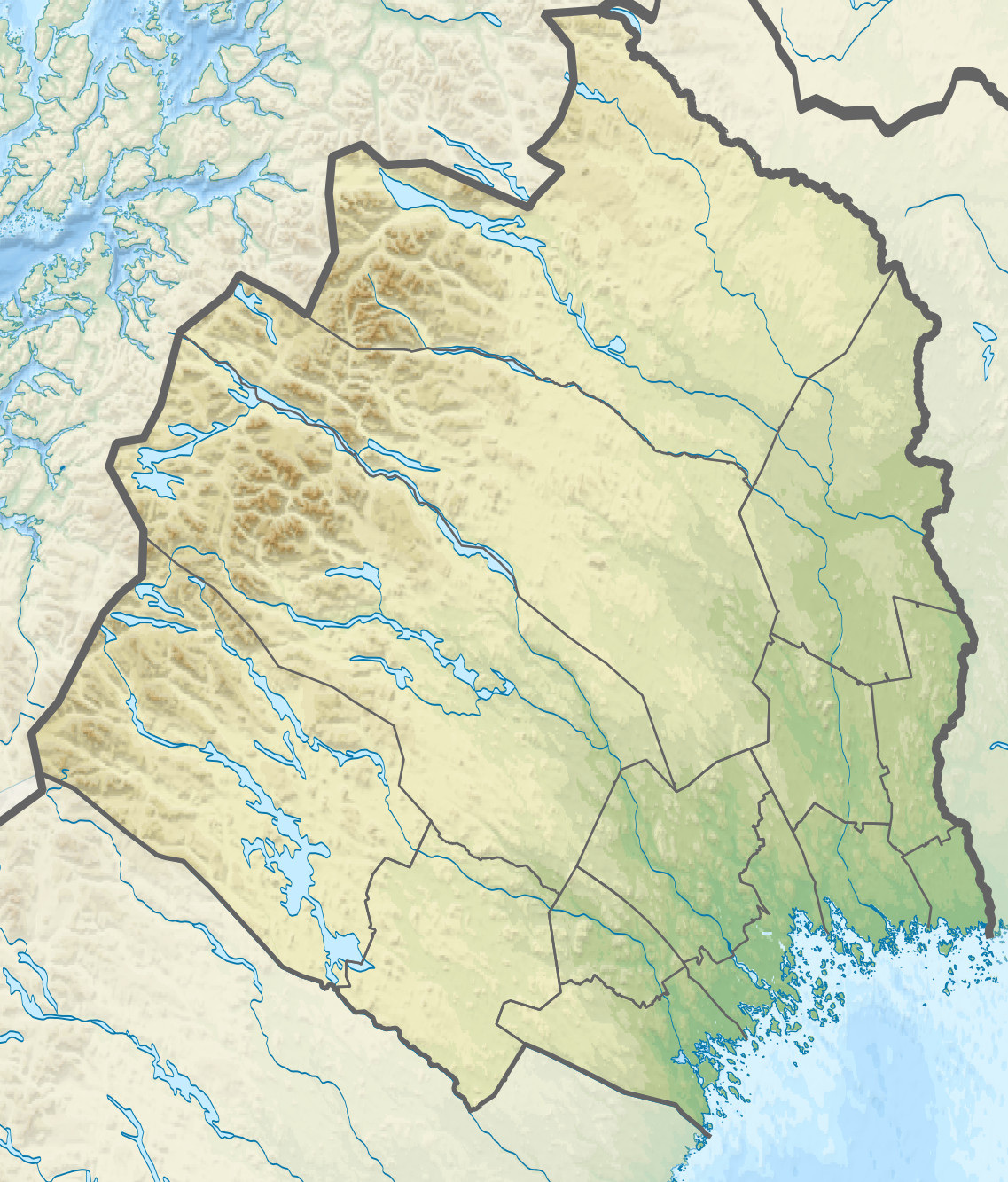
- Location within Norrbotten Location within Sweden
- Location: Norrbotten County, Lappland
- Coordinates: 67°08′N 19°20′E
- Basin countries: Sweden

Stora Lulevatten, "The Great Lule Water" is a lake in Norrbotten County, Lappland, Sweden.
