= Nottingham City Hospital =

- Nottingham University Hospitals NHS Trust
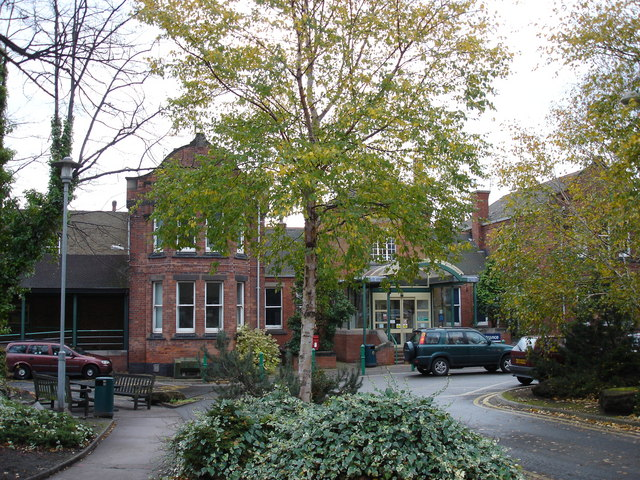
- North Entrance, Nottingham City Hospital

- Shown in Nottinghamshire

Geography
- Location: Nottingham, England
- Coordinates: 52°59′27″N 1°09′28″W

Organisation
- Care system: NHS
- Type: Teaching
- Affiliated university: University of Nottingham

Services
- Emergency department: No
- Beds: 1100

History
- Founded: 1903

Links
- Website: www.nuh.nhs.uk
- Lists: Hospitals in England

Nottingham City Hospital is a large hospital located in Nottingham, England. It occupies a large 90-acre (360,000 m^{2}) site on the ring road to the North of the city centre. It is composed of many buildings, most of which are joined by long corridors. Buildings include a leisure club, a Maggies Centre for people with cancer, and a patient hotel. It is managed by the Nottingham University Hospitals NHS Trust.

== History ==
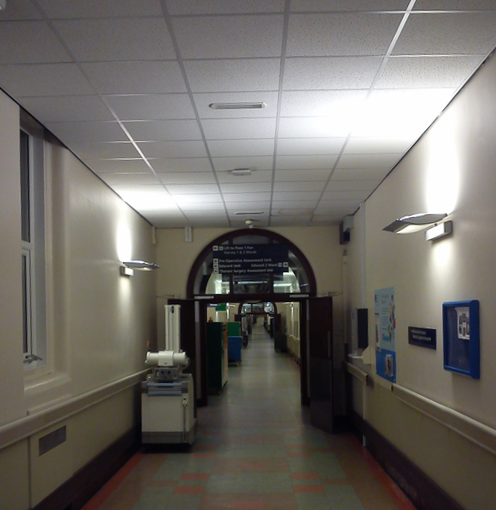
North Corridor

The hospital has its origins in a workhouse built in York Street in 1729 which was demolished to make way for an extension to the Manchester, Sheffield and Lincolnshire Railway in 1895. The complex was rebuilt and re-opened as the Bagthorpe Workhouse and Infirmary on 18 March 1903. The hospital incorporated a chapel, designed by Arthur Marshall in the Arts and Crafts style, which was dedicated on 13 August 1903.

The hospital served as a military hospital during the First World War and the Second World War.

The Bagthorpe Infirmary became the City Infirmary in 1930 and the City Hospital in 1937 before joining the National Health Service in 1948. The Nottingham School of Physiotherapy was opened by Group Captain Douglas Bader in 1965. The Bagthorpe Workhouse, which had developed into a facility for the elderly known as Sherwood Hospital, closed as a separate entity in 1983.

The Medical Research Centre was opened by the Duchess of Gloucester in 1986 and a new CT body scanner was unveiled by Princess Margaret in 1988. The Duke of Kent opened the department of clinical radiology and medical physics in 1992 and a new patient hotel came into use in 1994. The Nottingham Breast Institute was opened by Prince Charles in 2004 and a Maggie's Centre was opened by Sir Paul Smith in 2011.

In 2021 the trust secured funding from the Public Sector Decarbonisation Scheme to build a new energy centre which will be equipped with combined heat and power units. This is intended to reduce its carbon footprint by 14,000 tonnes and guarantee energy savings of approximately £1.8 million annually. The contract with Vital Energi includes installation of LED lighting, 300 kWe solar PV panels, and 342 kW air source heat pumps around the hospital.

In May 2024, the Victorian Society included the chapel in its list of the 10 most endangered buildings in the country.

== Services ==
The hospital serves as the regional centre for cancer care, nephrology, infectious diseases, cardiology, cardiothoracic surgery and burns; and is a national centre for shoulder surgery. It also serves as the respiratory medicine unit, and elective urology centre for Nottingham. Despite its size, the hospital has never had an Accident and Emergency (A&E) department. It also provides maternity and neonatal facilities.

In October 2022, the maternity unit was listed as one of nine such units which were rated inadequate in a review of maternity care by Dr Bill Kirkup.

The hospital has significant roles in teaching and research, in association with the University of Nottingham. Research interests include rheumatology, stroke, respiratory medicine and oncology. Medical students from the University of Nottingham Medical School are attached to most of the departments as part of their clinical training.

== See also ==
- List of hospitals in England
- Listed buildings in Nottingham (Sherwood ward)
