= Hardell =

Hardell is a surname. Notable people with the surname include:

- Lennart Hardell (born 1944), Swedish oncologist
- William Hardell (born 1100s), Mayor of London
