= List of hospitals in Sweden =

Here is a list of hospitals in Sweden.

- Blekinge County
  - Blekingesjukhuset - Karlshamn
  - Blekingesjukhuset - Karlskrona
- Dalarna County
  - Avesta Lasarett - Avesta
  - Borlänge Sjukhus - Borlänge
  - Falun Lasarett - Falun
  - Ludvika Lasarett - Ludvika
  - Mora Lasarett - Mora
- Gävleborg County
  - Bollnäs sjukhus - Bollnäs
  - Gävle Hospital - Gävle
  - Sjukhuset i Hudiksvall - Hudiksvall
- Gotland County
  - Visby Hospital - Visby
- Halland County
  - Halmstad Hospital - Halmstad
  - Varberg Hospital - Varberg
- Jämtland County
  - Region Jämtland Härjedalen - Östersund
- Kalmar County
  - Landstingsfastigheter - Kalmar
- Kronoberg County
  - Centrallasarettet i Växjö
  - Ljungby Hospital - Ljungby
- Norrbotten County
  - Kalix Hospital - Kalix
  - Sunderby Hospital - Boden and Luleå
  - Gällivare Hospital - Gällivare
  - Piteå Hospital - Piteå
  - Kiruna Hospital - Kiruna
- Östergötland County
  - Finspångs Lasarett - Finspång
  - Linköping University Hospital - Linköping
  - Vrinnevisjukhuset - Norrköping
- Skåne County
  - Helsingborg Hospital - Helsingborg
  - Ängelholm Hospital - Ängelholm
  - Hässleholms Hospital - Hässleholm
  - Landskrona Hospital - Landskrona
  - Skåne University Hospital - Malmö and Lund
  - Trelleborg Hospital - Trelleborg
  - Ystad Hospital - Ystad
  - Kristianstads Lasarett - Kristianstad
- Södermanland County
  - Mälarsjukhuset Eskilstuna - Eskilstuna
  - Karsudden Regional Hospital - Katrineholm
  - Kullbergska sjukhuset - Katrineholm
  - Nyköpings lasarett - Nyköping
- Stockholm County
  - Beckomberga Hospital - Bromma - psychiatric hospital (1932-1995)
  - Bromma sjukhus - Bromma
  - Dalens sjukhus - Enskededalen
  - Danderyds sjukhus - Danderyd
  - Ersta Hospital - Stockholm
  - Huddinge universitetssjukhus - Huddinge (now a part of Karolinska universitetssjukhuset and called Karolinska Universitetsjukhuset i Huddinge)
  - Jakobsbergs sjukhus - Järfälla
  - New Karolinska Solna University Hospital - Solna and Huddinge
  - Löwenströmska sjukhuset - Upplands Väsby
  - Norrtälje sjukhus - Norrtälje
  - Nynäshamns sjukhus - Nynäshamn
  - S:t Eriks ögonsjukhus - Stockholm Municipality
  - Saint Göran Hospital - Stockholm Municipality
  - Sabbatsbergs sjukhus - Stockholm Municipality
  - Sollentuna sjukhus - Sollentuna Municipality
  - Södersjukhuset - Stockholm Municipality
  - Södertälje sjukhus - Södertälje
  - Sophiahemmet sjukhus - Stockholm
  - Stockholm Heart Center
  - Regionala Cancercentrum i Samverkan - Stockholm
- Uppsala County
  - Lasarettet i Enköping - Enköping
  - Uppsala University Hospital (Swedish: Akademiska sjukhuset - Uppsala)
- Västerbotten County
  - Norrland University Hospital - Umeå
- Västra Götaland County
  - Alingsås lasarett - Alingsås
  - Södra Älvsborgs sjukhus - Borås
  - Skaraborgs Sjukhus Falköping - Falköping
  - Mölndals Sjukhus - Mölndal
  - Norra Älvsborgs Länssjukhus - Trollhättan
  - Frölunda Specialist Hospital - Västra Frölunda, Gothenburg
  - Sahlgrenska University Hospital - Gothenburg
  - Sahlgrenska University Hospital East - Gothenburg
  - Skaraborgs Sjukhus Lidköping - Lidköping
  - Skaraborgs sjukhus Skövde - Skövde
  - Uddevalla Hospital
  - Kungälvs sjukhus - Kungälv
- Jönköping County
  - Länssjukhuset Ryhov - Jönköping
  - Värnamo sjukhus - Värnamo
  - Höglandssjukhuset - Eksjö
- Örebro County
  - Karlskoga Hospital - Karlskoga
  - Örebro University Hospital - Örebro
  - Lindesbergs lasarett - Lindesberg
- Västmanland County
  - Köping Hospital - Köping
  - Västerås Central Hospital - Västerås
- Värmland County
  - Sjukhuset i Arvika - Arvika
  - Centralsjukhuset Karlstad - Karlstad
  - Torsby lasarett - Torsby
- Västernorrland County
  - Länssjukhuset Sundsvall-Härnösand - Härnösand
