= Frölunda Specialist Hospital =

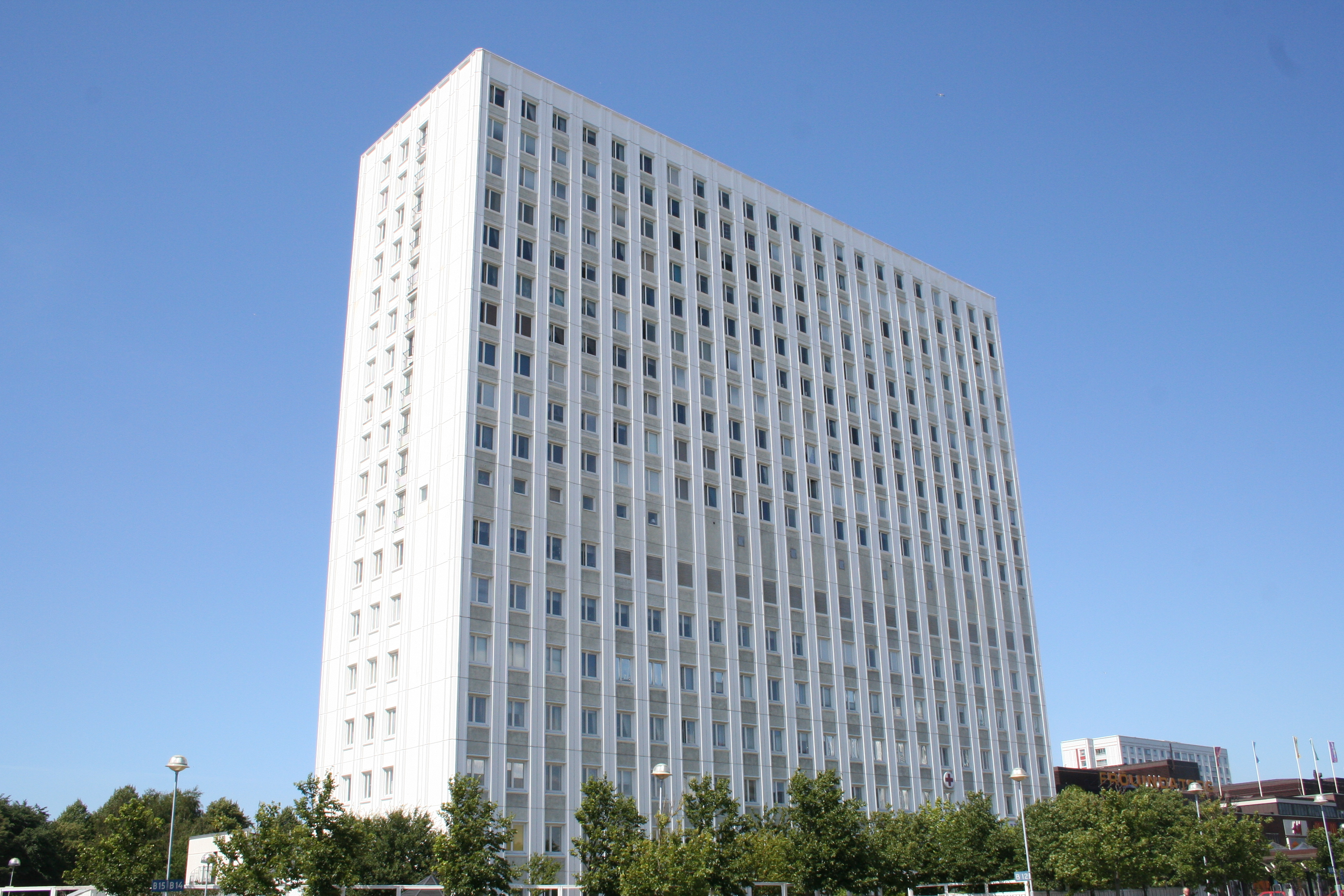

Geography
- Location: Frölunda, Sweden
- Coordinates: 57°39′2″N 11°54′44″E

Links
- Lists: Hospitals in Sweden

Frölunda specialist hospital (Swedish: Frölunda Specialistsjukhus) is located in Frölunda, right next to Frölunda torg, approximately nine kilometres south-west of central Gothenburg. The hospital primarily operate with elective care, with specialist in otolaryngology, neurology, gynaecology, orthopedic surgery, medicine, dermatology, ophthalmology, surgery, and radiography. The hospital was inaugurated in 1968 as a local hospital for people living in Tynnered, Frölunda, and Älvsborg. Today, 190 people work at the hospital which is owned by Västra Götaland Regional Council.

The 17-storey building is 55 metres (180 ft) high. The hospital occupies the bottom five floors; the rest are residential.
