= Jubileumsparken =

Park in Gothenburg, Sweden

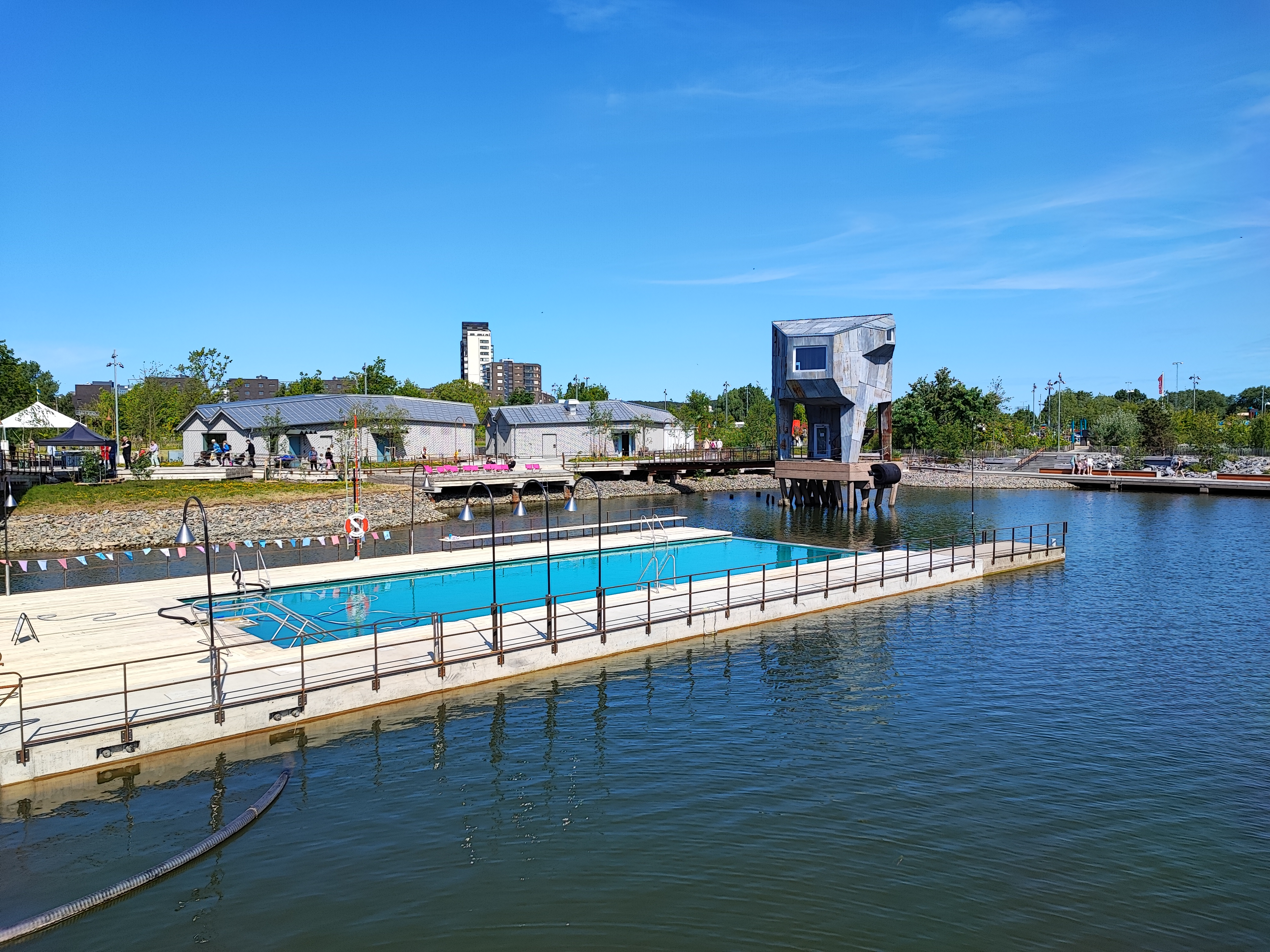
- Outdoor swimming area in the park (2023)
- Interactive map of Jubileumsparken
- Location: Gothenburg, Sweden
- Coordinates: 57°43′1.84″N 11°57′34.89″E
- Opened: 2021
- Owner: Västra Götaland Regional Council
- Status: Open year round

Jubileumsparken is located in the Tingstadsvassen district of Gothenburg. The park cost 347 million SEK and is part of Gothenburg urban redevelopment plan named "Älvstaden". It was initially scheduled to open during Gothenburg's 400th anniversary in 2021, but parts of the park were delayed to 2023. The park will continue to expand until around year 2035 to finally reach around 8-10 hectares.

Jubileumsparken was designed by "Marel landscape architects" and "Atelier Le Balto".
