= Västerås Central Hospital =

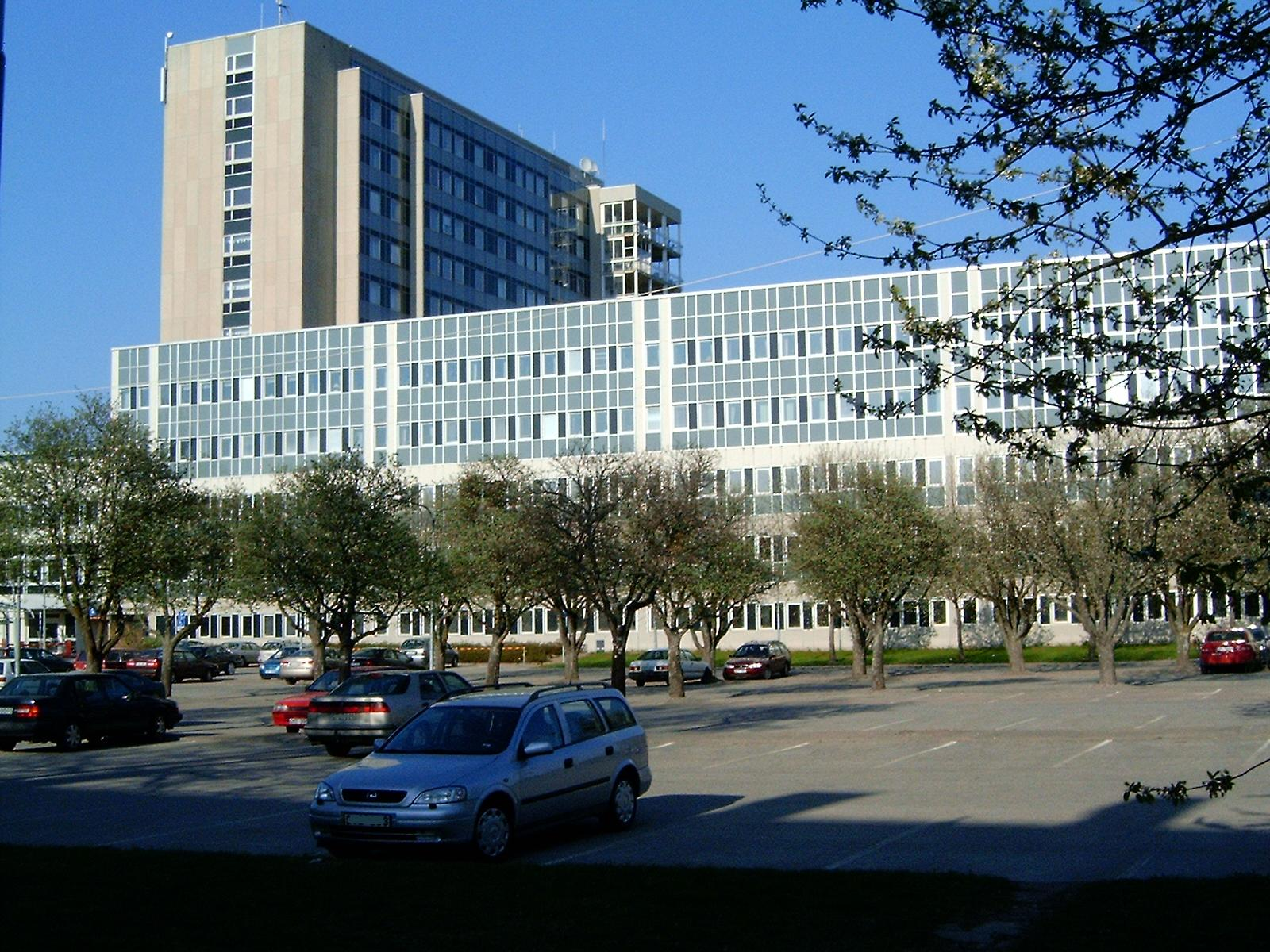
- Västerås Central Hospital in 2006

Geography
- Location: Västerås, Västmanland County, Sweden
- Coordinates: 59°37′03″N 16°34′57″E

Links
- Lists: Hospitals in Sweden

Västerås Central Hospital (Swedish: Västmanlands sjukhus Västerås or Västerås Centrallasarett) in Västerås is the county hospital of Västmanland County in Sweden. It has about 3,000 employees.
