= Skåne University Hospital =

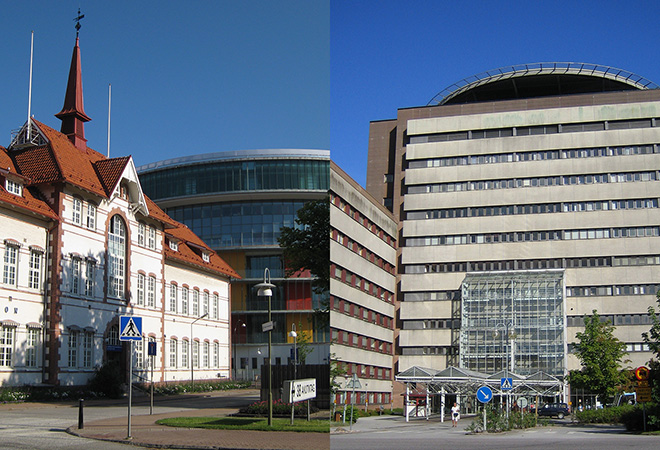
- Skåne University Hospital; Malmö (left) and Lund (right)

Geography
- Location: Malmö and Lund, Sweden
- Coordinates: 55°35′17″N 13°00′09″E (Malmö); 55°42′42″N 13°11′54″E (Lund)

Organisation
- Type: Teaching
- Affiliated university: Lund University

Services
- Emergency department: Yes

History
- Founded: 1 January 2010

Links
- Lists: Hospitals in Sweden

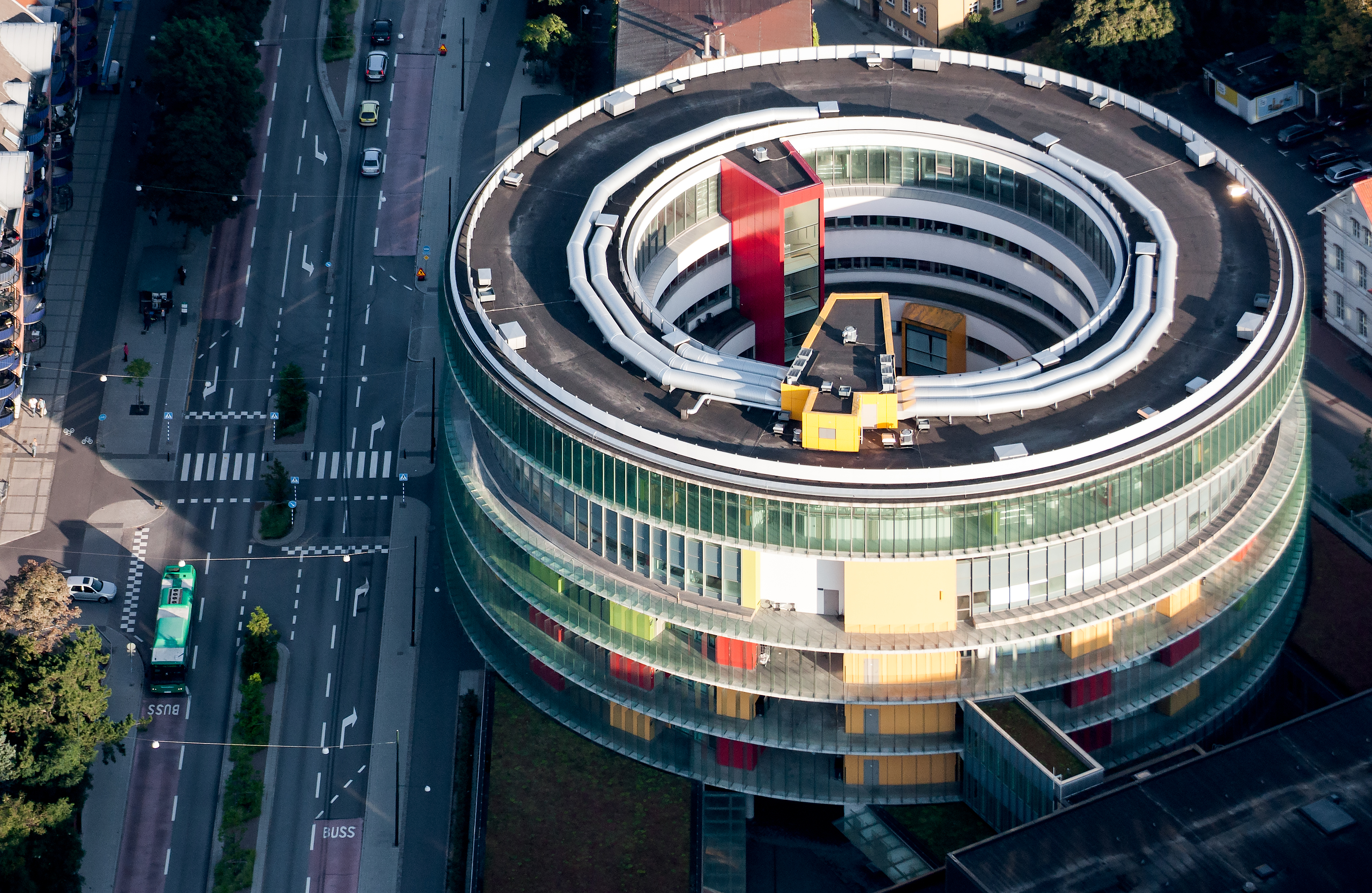
Emergency department in Malmö

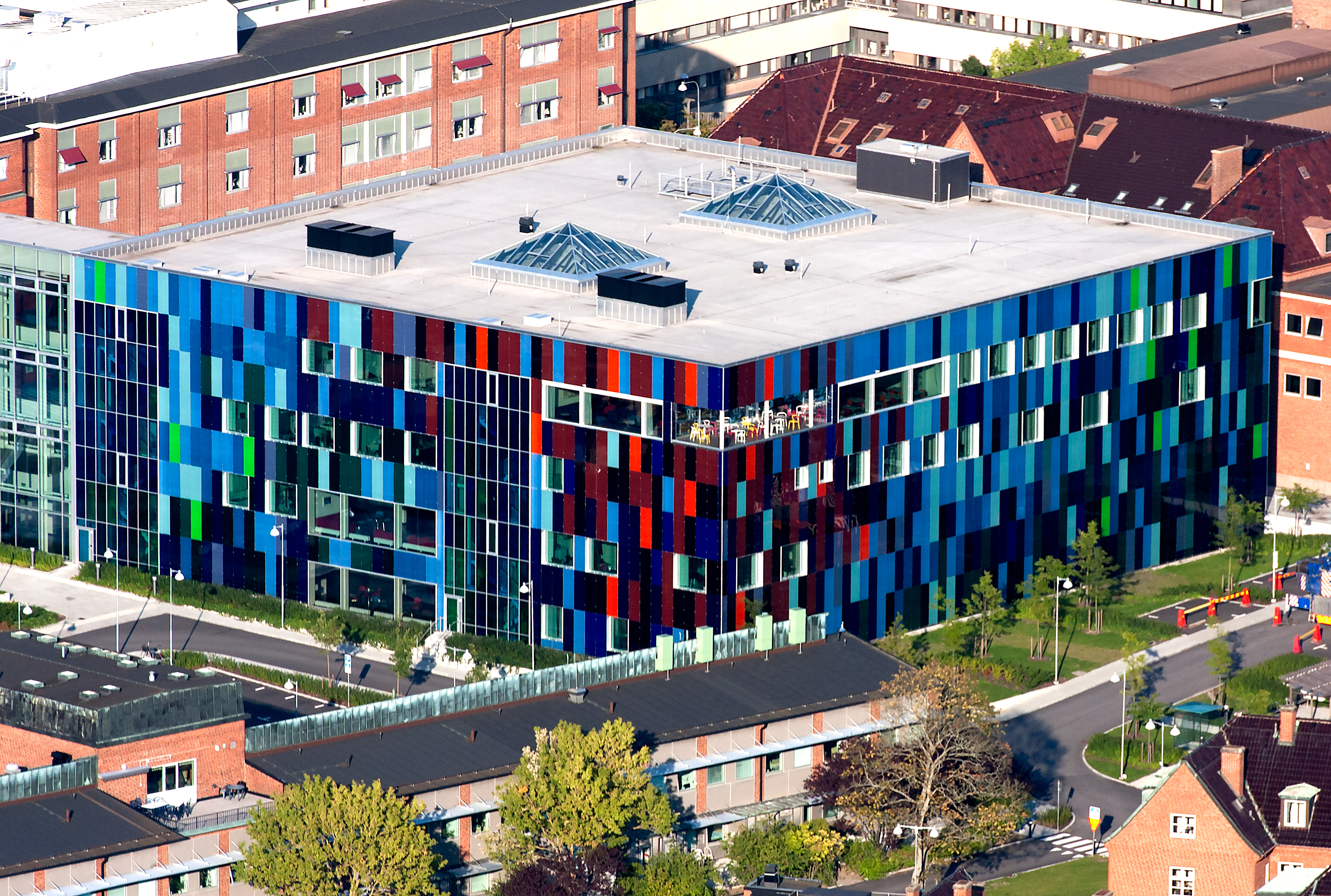
Radiation therapy clinic in Lund

Skåne University Hospital (Swedish: Skånes universitetssjukhus, SUS) is a university hospital in Scania, Sweden. The hospital was founded in 2010 through the merger of the two university hospitals in Lund and Malmö.

== Operations ==
Skåne University Hospital is part of Region Skåne and the third largest of Sweden's seven university hospitals, with about 13,000 employees. Skåne University Hospital is closely affiliated with Malmö University and Lund University. Their association with Lund University allows for integrating research into medical services that support patient care in prevention, diagnosis and treatment affecting approximately 1.7 million people throughout the southern part of Sweden.

Skåne is one of two national centers for pediatric and adult cardio-thoracic surgery as well as for heart and lung transplants. Since June 2018 the hospital has an additional assignment together with Karolinska University Hospital to treat children suffering from congenital malformations.
