= Varberg Hospital =

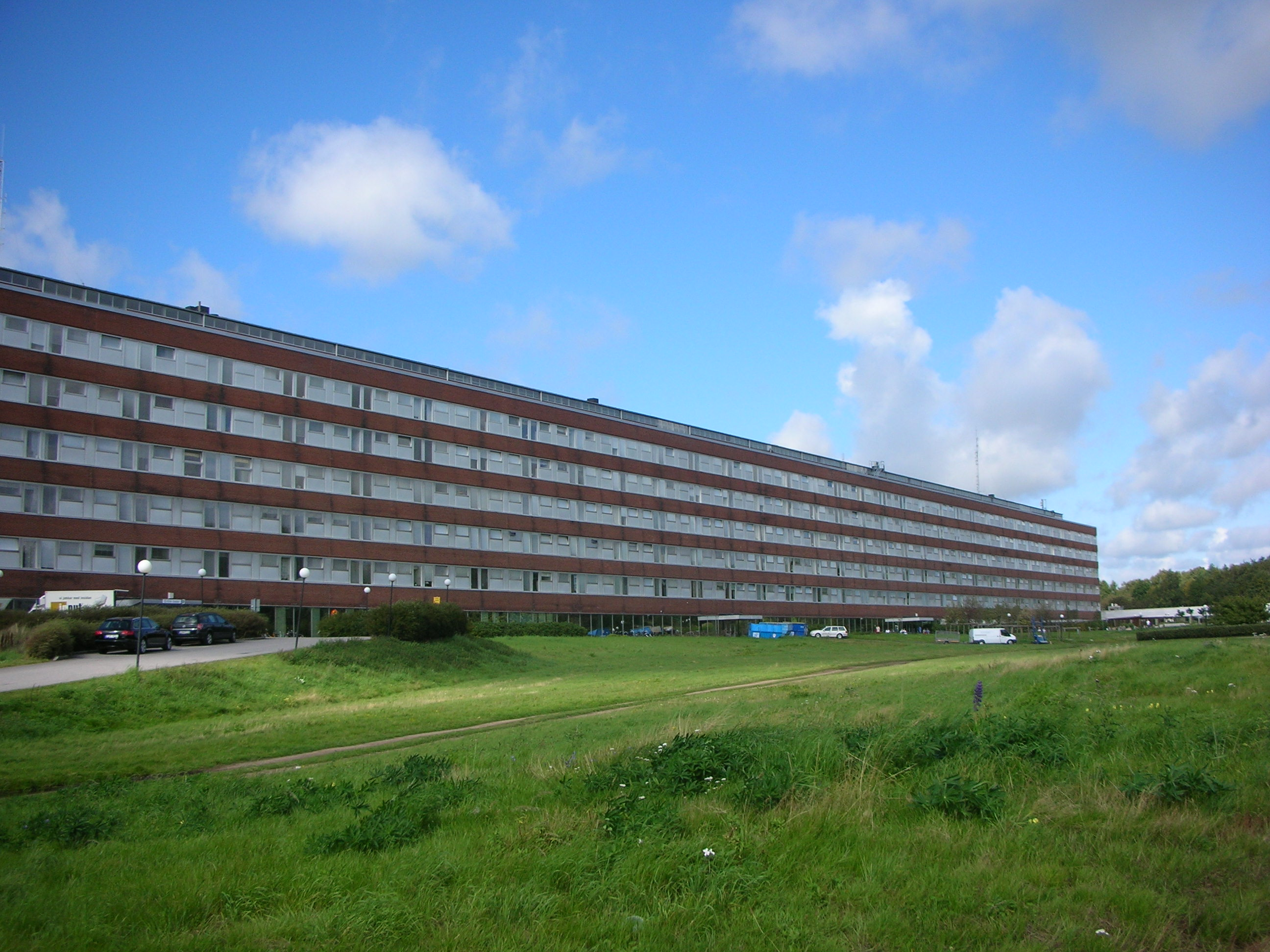

Geography
- Location: Varberg, Halland County, Sweden
- Coordinates: 57°5′53.57″N 12°16′36.61″E

Organisation
- Type: District General

Services
- Emergency department: Yes
- Beds: 800

Helipads
- Helipad: No

History
- Founded: 1972

Links
- Lists: Hospitals in Sweden

Varberg Hospital (Swedish: Varbergs Sjukhus) is a district general hospital in Varberg, Sweden. The hospital was completed in 1972 as a replacement of the old hospital in the city. After that, the old hospital was demolished. Varberg Hospital has 450 beds for general medical care and 350 beds for psychiatric treatment.
