= Karlskoga Hospital =

Karlskoga lasarett
- Region Örebro
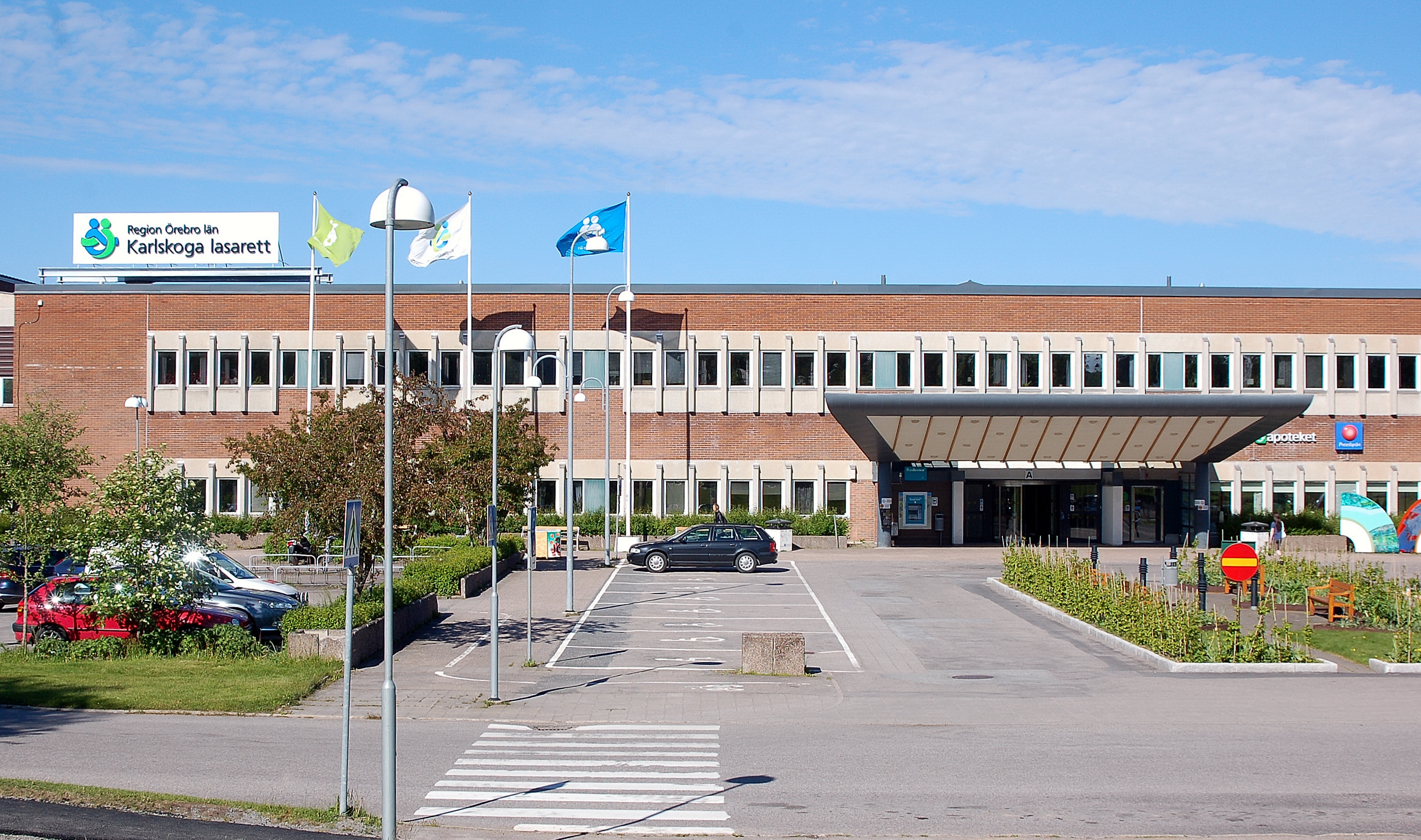
- Main entrance of the hospital

Geography
- Location: Karlskoga, Örebro County, Sweden
- Coordinates: 59°18′56.59″N 14°30′19.68″E

Organisation
- Type: District General

Services
- Emergency department: Yes

History
- Founded: 1942

Links
- Lists: Hospitals in Sweden

Karlskoga Hospital (Swedish: Karlskoga lasarett) is a rural general hospital in the Skranta area of Karlskoga, Sweden, serving a catchment area of 70,000 people.

== History ==
Karlskoga Hospital was opened in 1942. Its predecessor was Karlskoga sjukstuga, also known as Karlskoga old hospital, a healthcare facility on Kungsvägen in Karlskoga, which opened to the public on April 1, 1884. The original building was a two-story timbered house, but a new brick building was inaugurated 17 years later in 1901, near Karlskoga Church. The decision to construct a new healthcare facility was made in 1899 because the former one lacked capacity.

The hospital is one of three hospitals within the Örebro County Region, the others being the Örebro University Hospital and Lindesberg Hospital. The hospital employs approximately 730 people and serves as an emergency hospital for the western part of Örebro County, the municipalities of Karlskoga and Degerfors, as well as the eastern part of Värmland County, including the municipalities of Kristinehamn, Storfors, and Filipstad. The total population in the area is around 70,000 residents. Karlskoga Hospital consists of six clinics and has 130 beds.

The birthing center at Karlskoga Hospital was shut down in 2019.

In 2012, Karlskoga Hospital received the Swedish Quality Award (Swedish: Svensk Kvalitet).
