= Lennart Hardell =

Swedish oncologist

- Education: Umeå University
- Scientific career
- Fields: Oncology
- Workplaces: Örebro University Hospital
- Thesis: Epidemiological studies on soft-tissue sarcoma and malignant lymphoma and their relation to phenoxy acid or chlorophenol exposure (1981)

Lennart Hardell (born 1944), is a Swedish oncologist and professor at Örebro University Hospital in Örebro, Sweden. He is known for his research into what he says are environmental cancer-causing agents, such as Agent Orange, and has said that cell phones increase the risk of brain tumors.

== Mobile phone use and cancer ==
Hardell's research on cell phones and cancer concluded that long-term mobile phone use is associated with an increased risk of acoustic neuroma and glioma. He has said that children should be banned from using cell phones except in emergencies, as he feels the risk of cancer is greater in people who begin using mobile phones before the age of 20. However, after decades of research, these findings have not been consistently replicated by other studies.

His early research on wireless phones and cancer was criticized in a 2002 review for methodological flaws. The review authors, John D. Boice Jr. and Joseph K. McLaughlin, wrote that Hardell's study, published in the European Journal of Cancer Prevention, was "non-informative, either because the follow-up was too short and numbers of cancers too small, or because of serious methodological limitations." Another of Hardell's studies, in which he claimed that mobile phone users in rural areas were at a greater risk of developing brain tumors, was criticized by Adam Burgess in Spiked. Burgess wrote that the study was "post hoc and therefore hypothesis-generating only," and said that the increased risk Hardell had claimed to have found in the study was "barely statistically significant."

Later studies by the Hardell group have consistently shown increasingly significant risks for brain tumor development associated with wireless phone use. His findings, together with results from the international INTERPHONE study on mobile phones and health, contributed to the verdict by WHO and IARC in 2011, where mobile phone radiation was deemed as "possibly" carcinogenic (group 2B). However, this classification has been criticized by ICNIRP, which argued that the evidence supporting the "possibly carcinogenic" classification was limited and did not adequately consider methodological issues and the overall weight of evidence.

Little et al. reported in 2012 that the increased risk of glioma associated with mobile phone use found by a 2011 study by Hardell et al. were not consistent with observed trends in glioma incidence in the United States. Although with regard to the paper of Little et al., data on mobile phone use and cancer incidence rates in the US is more difficult to compare with the aforementioned European studies on mobile phone use and cancer risks than it seems, especially due to differences in technology standards between the US and Europe in early years of mobile phone network technology development – including notable differences in power output between the CDMA standard (which had been widely implemented in the US) and the GSM standard.

Recent systematic reviews, such as the one by Karipidis et al. (2024), critically examine the association between radiofrequency electromagnetic fields (RF-EMF) and cancer. This study highlights significant methodological shortcomings in earlier works, including those by Hardell et al., and finds no consistent evidence linking mobile phone use to increased risks of glioma or other critical neoplasms. These findings underscore the necessity of interpreting Hardell's results with caution, given the robust counter-evidence and more rigorous methodologies employed in subsequent research.

=== Court cases ===
Hardell testified in a 2002 US court case involving a man who filed a lawsuit claiming that his cell phone caused him to develop a brain tumor. The judge in the case, Catherine C. Blake, dismissed the suit and criticized Hardell's testimony, saying that of the two studies Hardell cited, one found no increased risk of tumors associated with cell phone use. Blake added that the other study was criticized as flawed by experts, and said that numerous studies and governmental bodies had come to conclusions that ran contrary to Hardell's opinion.

In 2012, based on Hardell's research, Italy's supreme court ruled that a business executive's brain tumor was caused by his cell phone use. This decision was made despite the lack of solid scientific evidence and the absence of a described biophysical causal mechanism to explain the alleged association between mobile phone use and tumor development.
