= NU Hospital Group =

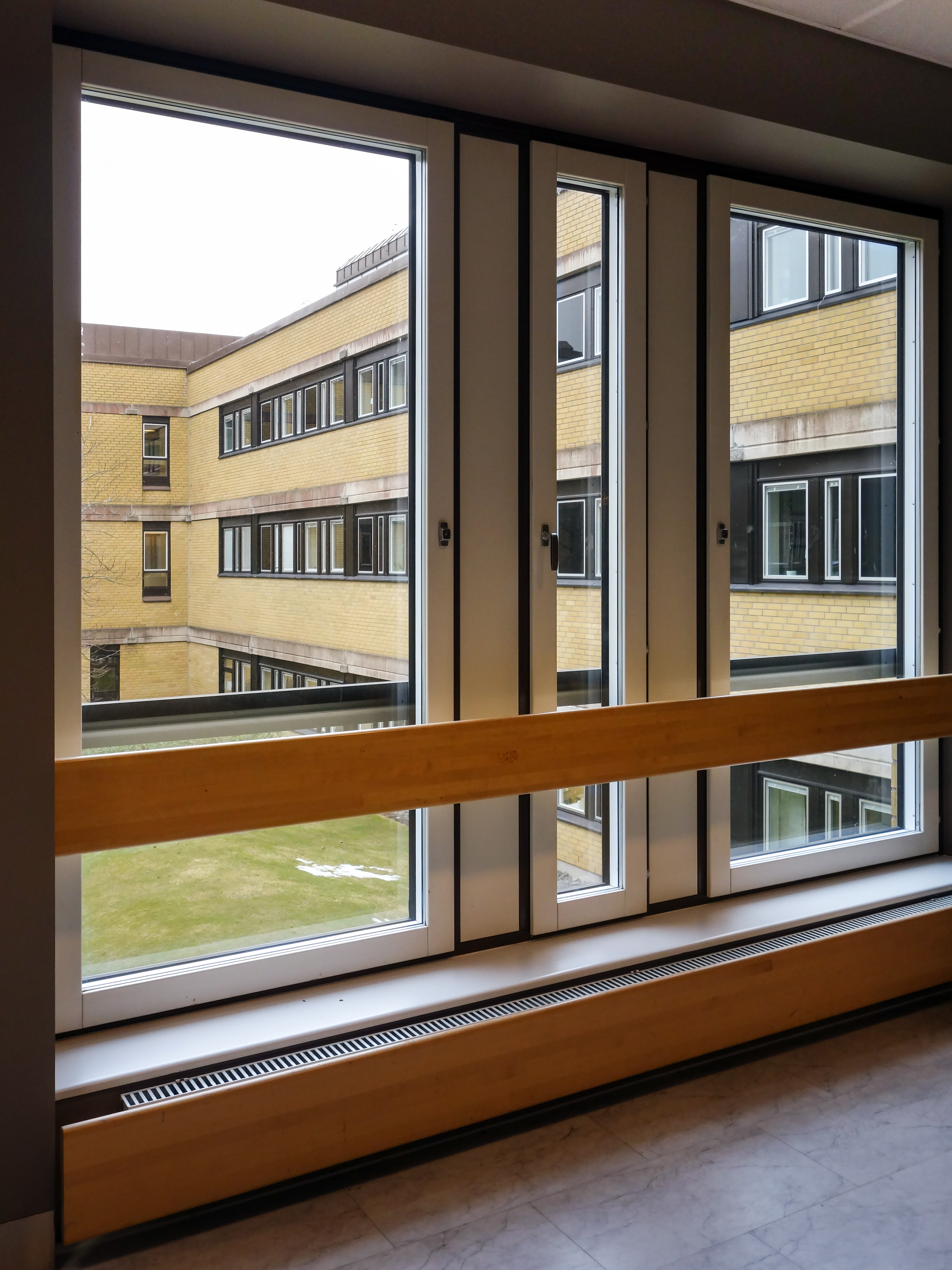
- One of the inner yards at NÄL, seen through a window on level 2

Geography
- Location: Västra Götaland, Sweden

Organisation
- Type: Public

Services
- Beds: 780

Links
- Website: www.nusjukvarden.se (in english)
- Lists: Hospitals in Sweden

The NU Hospital Group consists mainly of two hospitals in Sweden; Norra Älvsborgs Länssjukhus in Trollhättan and Uddevalla Sjukhus in Uddevalla. NU Hospital Group also includes three smaller local hospitals in Lysekil, Strömstad and Dalsland. It serves 270,000 residents of Dalsland, northern Bohuslän and the towns of Trollhättan, Uddevalla and Vänersborg. In 2009, NU Hospital Group treated 126,000 outpatients over the course of 479,000 hospital visits, and 27,000 inpatients over the course of 39,000 visits. The NU Hospital Group is part of the Västra Götaland Regional Council.

== Resources ==
The NU Hospital Group employs approximately 5,000 people, including approximately 1,700 nurses, 1,500 healthcare assistants 600 doctors. It has a capacity of 780 inpatients. NU Hospital Group has a turnover of 3.8 billion SEK.

Specialist clinics include cardiology, neurology/stroke care, nephrology, pulmonary medicine, hematology, gastroenterology, rheumatology, geriatrics, physical rehabilitation, dermatology, infectious medicine, pediatrics, psychiatry for both adults and children, gastric surgery, vascular surgery, urology, breast surgery, orthopedics, gynecology, ophthalmology and otorhinolaryngology. Its radiology department has 5 CT scanners and 3 MRI scanners, whereof one is a 3 Tesla. There is also an intensive care unit and operating rooms, as well as departments for clinical chemistry, bacteriology and pathology.

== Norra Älvsborgs Länssjukhus ==
Norra Älvsborgs Länssjukhus
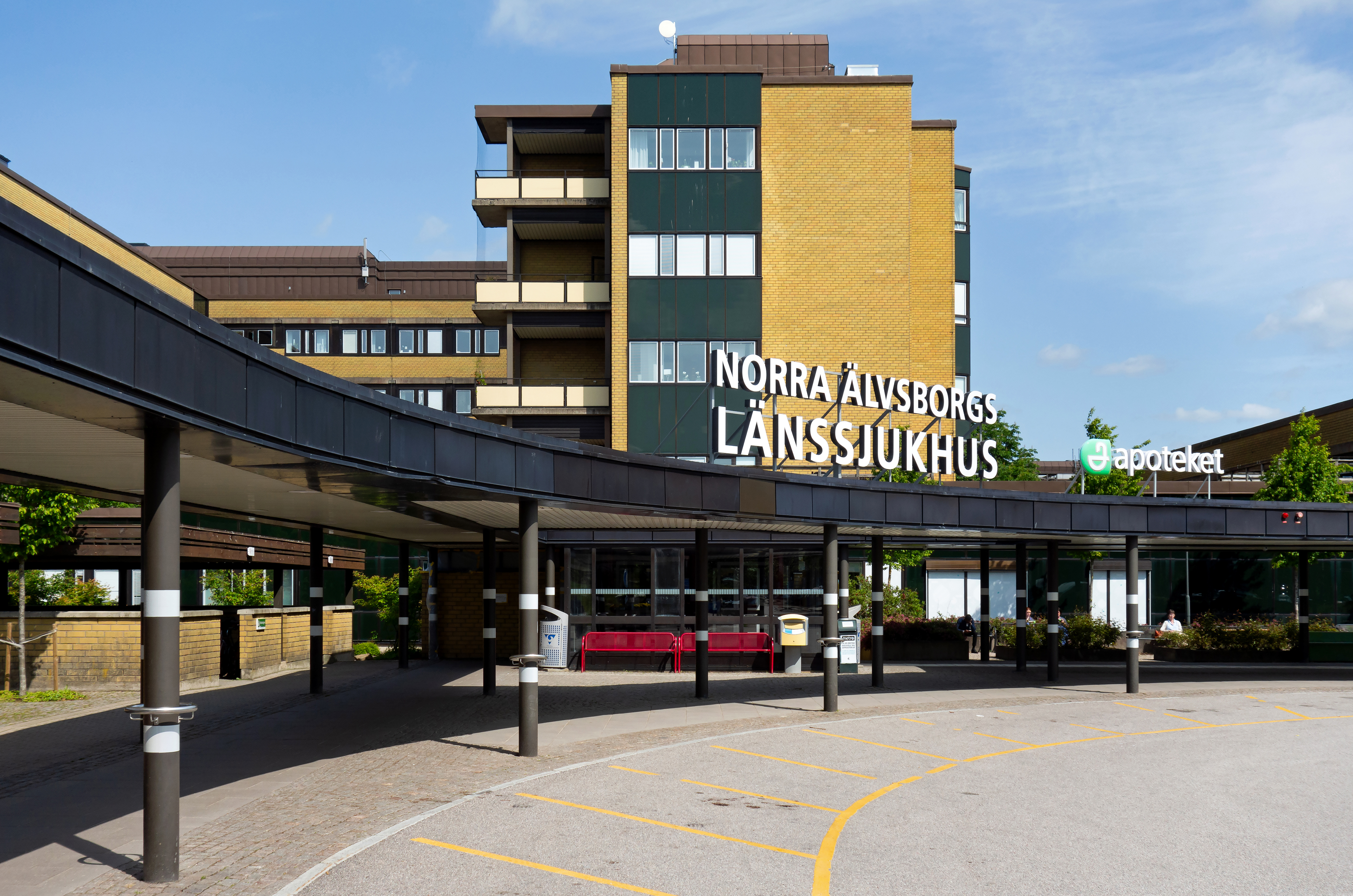
- Norra Älvsborgs Länssjukhus

Geography
- Location: Trollhättan, Sweden
- Coordinates: 58°19′5″N 12°15′55″E

Links
- Lists: Hospitals in Sweden

Norra Älvsborgs Länssjukhus (Swedish for Northern Älvsborg county hospital), commonly called NÄL, is located in Trollhättan. The hospital was completed in 1988 and was a merger between two hospitals in Trollhättan and Vänersborg.

The hospital has about 560 beds and about 2,900 employees.

It is focused at emergency care, including a regular emergency department, a maternity ward as well as an adult emergency psychiatry department.

== Uddevalla Hospital ==
Uddevalla Hospital
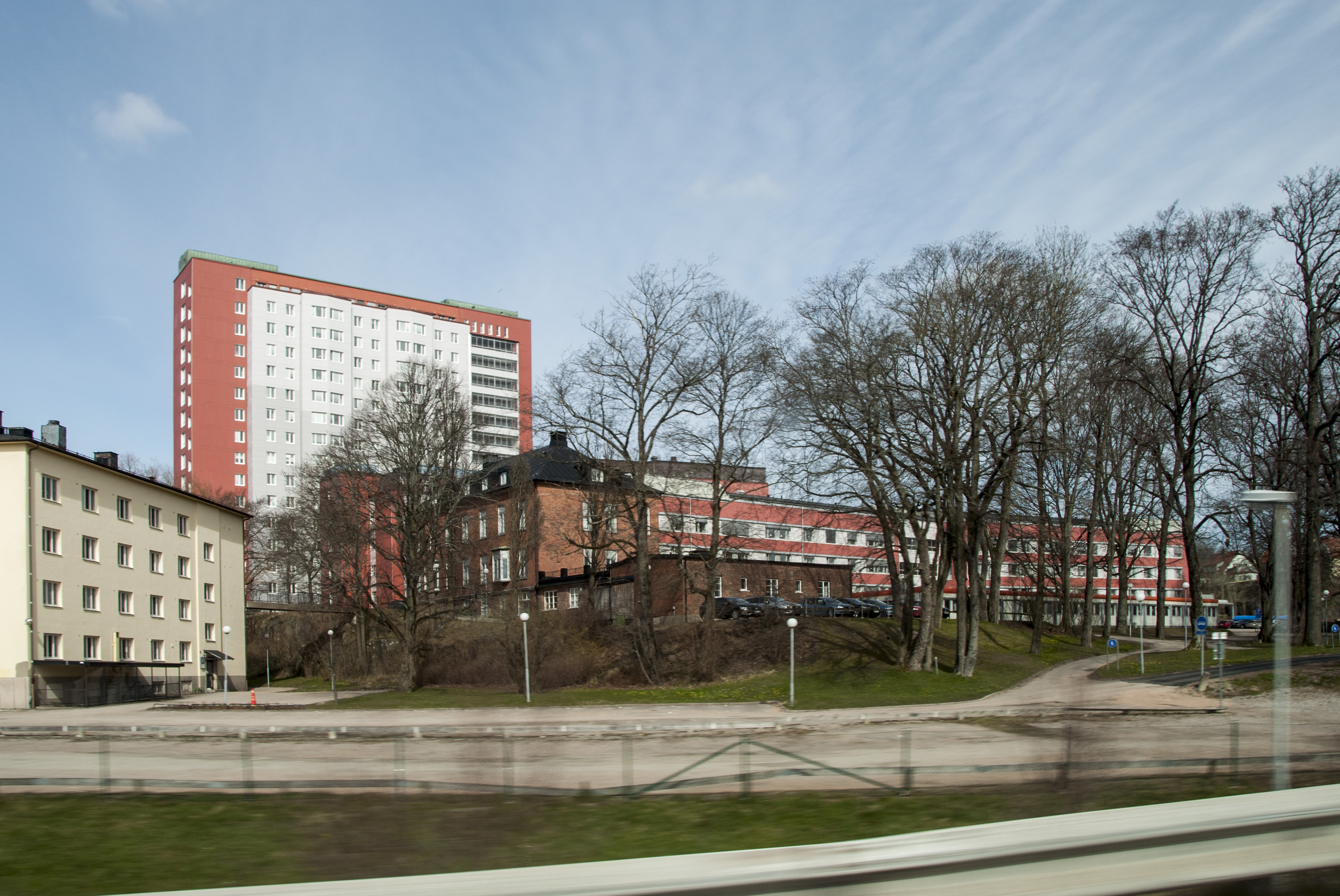

Geography
- Location: Uddevalla, Sweden
- Coordinates: 58°21′22″N 11°55′47″E

Links
- Lists: Hospitals in Sweden

Uddevalla Hospital has approximately 1,600 employees. It has almost exclusively scheduled health care. People with emergent conditions in Uddevalla and nearby regions are transported to Norra Älvsborgs Länssjukhus.
