= Värnamo Hospital =

Hospital in Sweden

- Region Jönköpings län
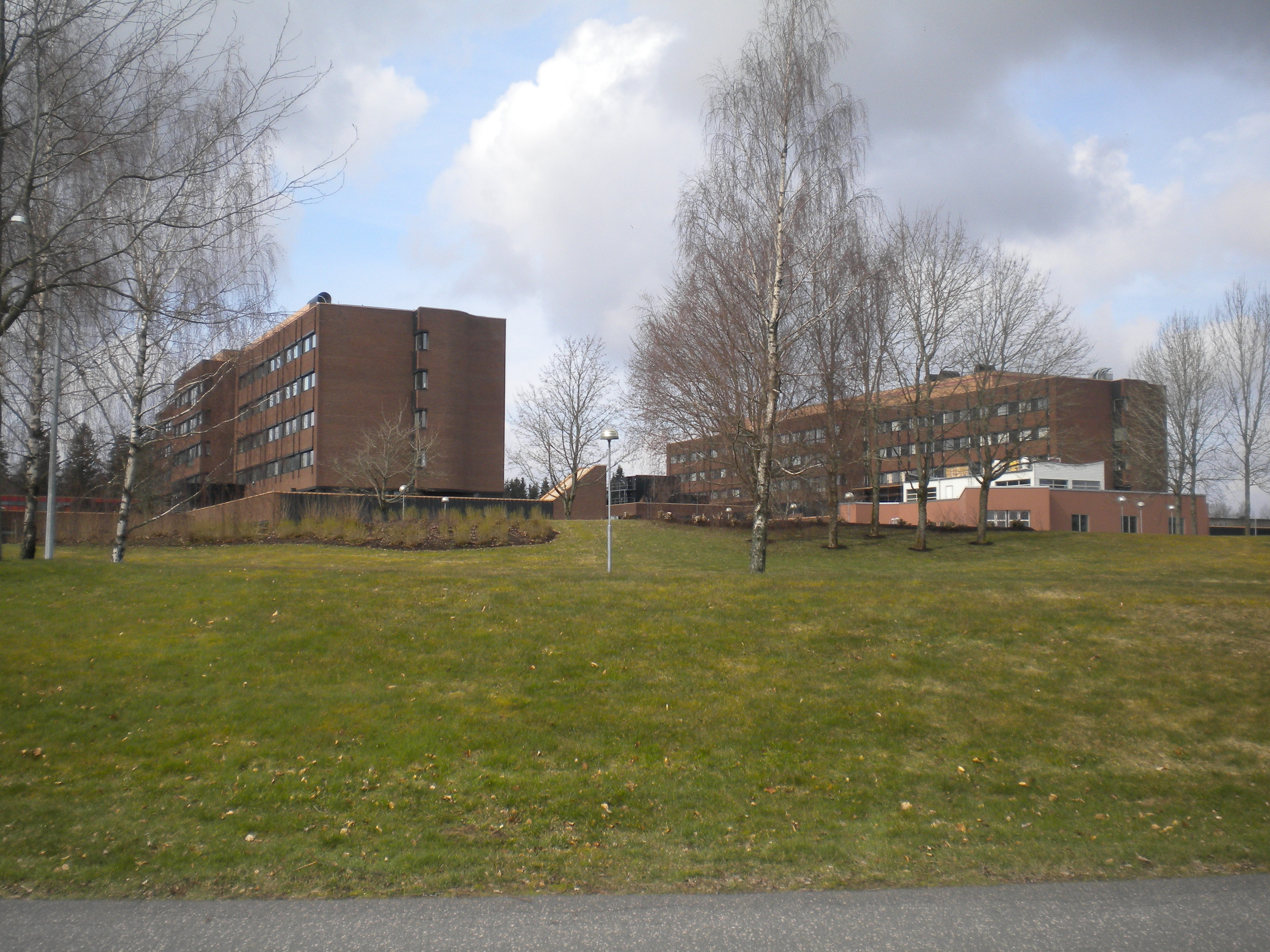
- The hospital seen from a nearby road

Geography
- Location: Värnamo, Jönköping County, Sweden
- Coordinates: 57°10′26″N 14°1′41″E

Organisation
- Type: General

Services
- Emergency department: Yes
- Beds: 127

History
- Opened: 1976

Links
- Website: www.rjl.se/varnamosjukhus
- Lists: Hospitals in Sweden

Värnamo Hospital (Swedish: Värnamo sjukhus) is a rural general hospital in Värnamo, Sweden. It's one of three hospitals in Jönköping County and serves a population of around 96,000. It employs 1,300 people of which 125 are doctors. When it opened in 1976 it replaced Värnamo lasarett from 1923.
