= Ljungby Hospital =

Ljungby Lasarett
- Region Kronoberg
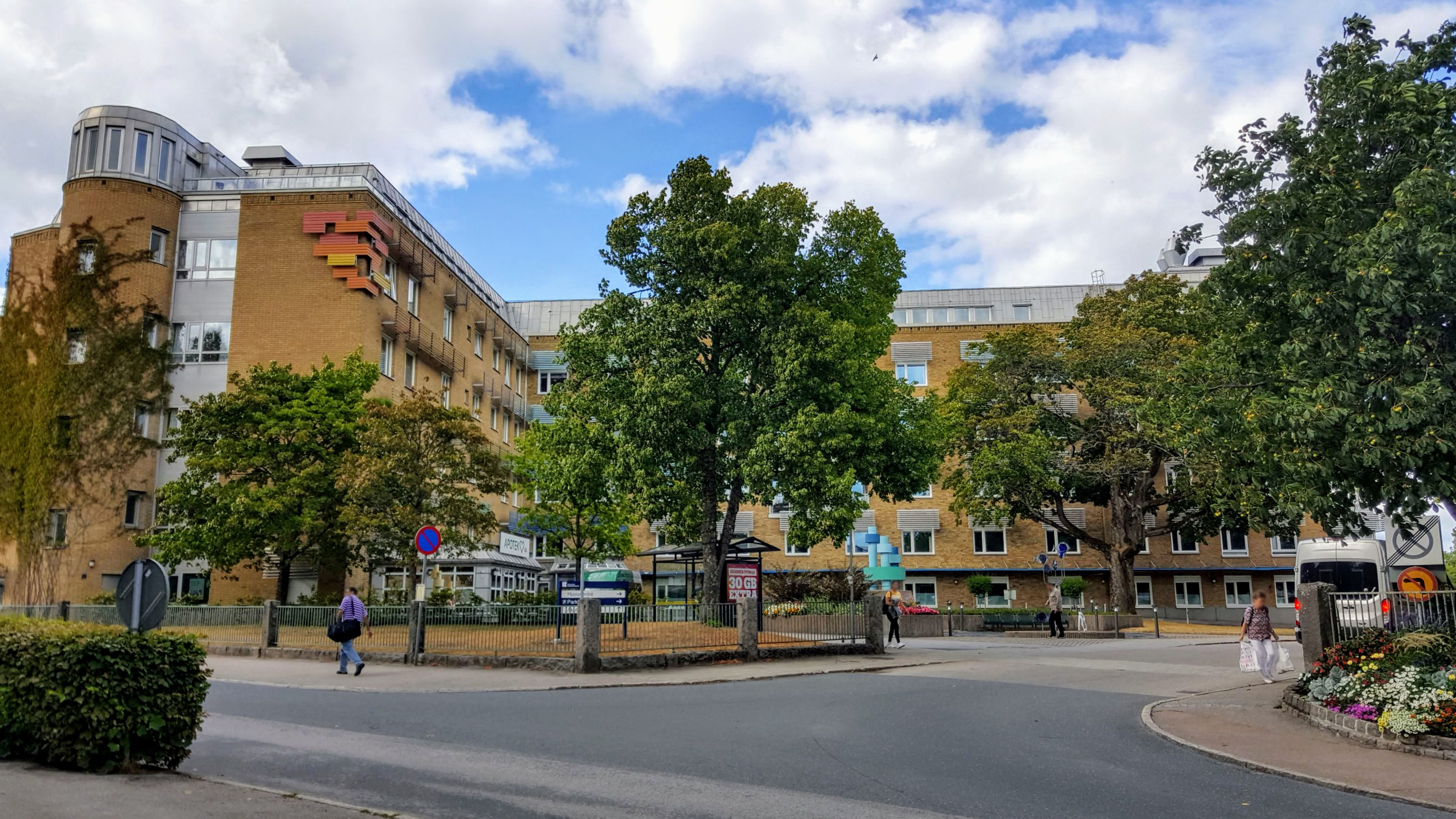
- South-side main entrance of the hospital

Geography
- Location: Ljungby, Kronoberg County, Sweden
- Coordinates: 56°50′07.3″N 13°56′07.7″E

Organisation
- Type: District General
- Network: Södra sjukvårdsregionen

Services
- Emergency department: Yes

Helipads
- Helipad: No

History
- Founded: 1869; 1955 (current)

Links
- Website: 1177.se
- Lists: Hospitals in Sweden

Ljungby Hospital (Swedish: Lasarettet Ljungby) is a public hospital in Ljungby, Sweden with a catchment area of 55,000 people. Ljungby and Central Hospital Växjö are the two hospitals in Kronoberg County.

== History ==
Carl Johan Ekström – director general over the nations hospice and hospitals – in 1838 put forward the need of a hospital in Ljungby. But it was not until 1863, at the first meeting of newly created Kronoberg's County Council, when a motion was put forward to build one in Sunnerbo Hundred. During an 1866 county council meeting it was decided that the planned hospital would be exclusively for the needs of Sunnerbo Hundred. However, the Kronoberg County council would be unable pay for it with the "kurhusavgift"-tax of 3 skilling banco due to legal difficulties; the municipality of Sunnerbo would be responsible for its maintenance.

=== 1869 to 1913 ===
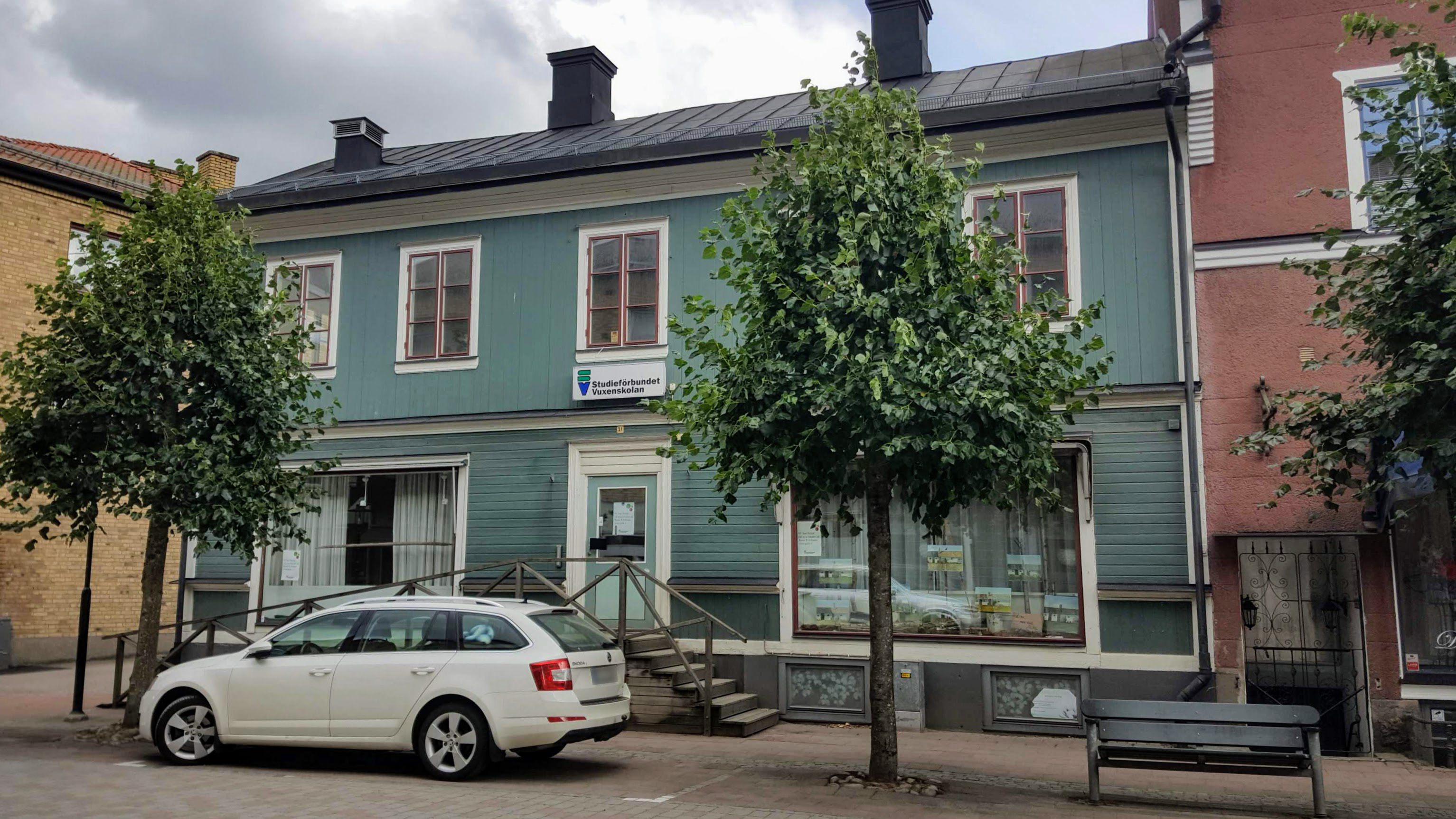
Part of the wooden building that was the hospital between 1869 and 1913. It has today been moved to Kungsgatan in central Ljungby.

Sunnerbo's new hospital was built on a gravelly hill just outside the market town – near the newbuilt church – on a plot donated by pharmacist Edvard Berg. The cost of the hospital plus inventory amounted to 31,000 riksdaler, whereof 12,000 riksdaler came from the amortization loan and 19,468 riksdaler from the "estate inventory" of Växjö hospital when the spun-off Sunnerbo hospital district was created.

The hospital opened on January 1, 1869, and looked like a slightly larger dwelling house. The reason for this is said to have been that no experts were consulted during the construction. It was made of wood, and had two floors and a basement. The basement contained a food cellar, bathroom, autopsy room, and morgue. The ground floor contained a kitchen and a doctor's residence with five rooms. The upper floor had five sickrooms and 27 beds. The attic had four garrets for venereal patients.

The hospital expanded in 1882 with the construction of a separate doctor's dwelling. In 1897 they expanded once again with the addition of running water and electrical light in all rooms. In 1890 the hospital was made a county hospital (länslasarett) and merged with Växjö hospital district.

During 1899 the hospital cared for 442 patients and performed 259 surgeries. The staff consisted of a doctor, a trustee, two nurses, two assistants, and one janitor.

In 1908 it was decided to replace the old building with a new one, as the wooden structure was considered a danger to patients. The new hospital was designed by Rudolf Lange from Gothenburg. His blueprint was approved by the county council in 1911. They received eleven construction offers between 162,500 and 214,000 kronor, and of those the second offer at 178,000 was chosen.

=== 1913 to 1955 ===
The new hospital, with room for 75 patients, was officially opened on November 10, 1913, by governor Alexis Hammarström, although the first patients had moved into the hospital two months before, on September 12.

In 1932 an isolation hospital for 44 patients was erected.

In 1945 it was decided that Ljungby hospital should be a district hospital with surgery, medicine, and x-ray departments, a district dental clinic, maternity and pediatric wards, and a dispensary. A building committee started planning the modernization and refurbishment, and one of the first implementations was a new boiler-room with laundry room, which started construction in 1946. In 1949 the finalized blueprints were sent to Centrala Sjukvårdsberedningen (Eng: The Central Health Care Preparation) for approval, but were rejected, as a refurbishment would be all to expensive—it would be better to demolish the old hospital and build a new one.

During a 1950 meeting Ljungby city council announced their interest in buying the hospital's plot and buildings and moving its operations. However, the new boiler central was almost finished. If the operations were to be moved, they would have to queue again for approval of yet another boiler central, which might delay the new construction by up to 10 years. It was thereby decided that the hospital would be left in place.

Rudolf Lange's blueprints from 1911 of the hospital and its buildings that were finished in 1913.

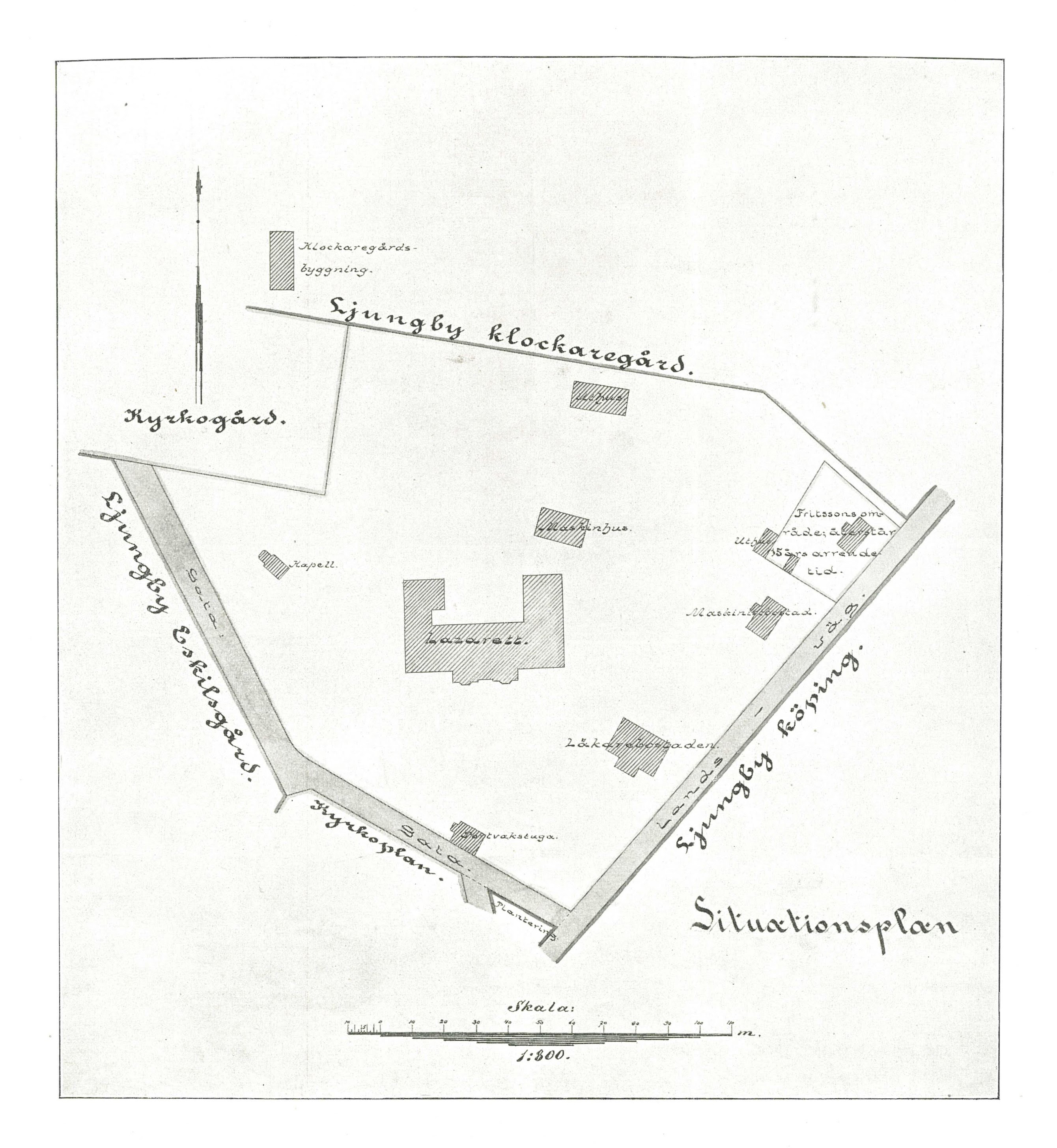
Overview

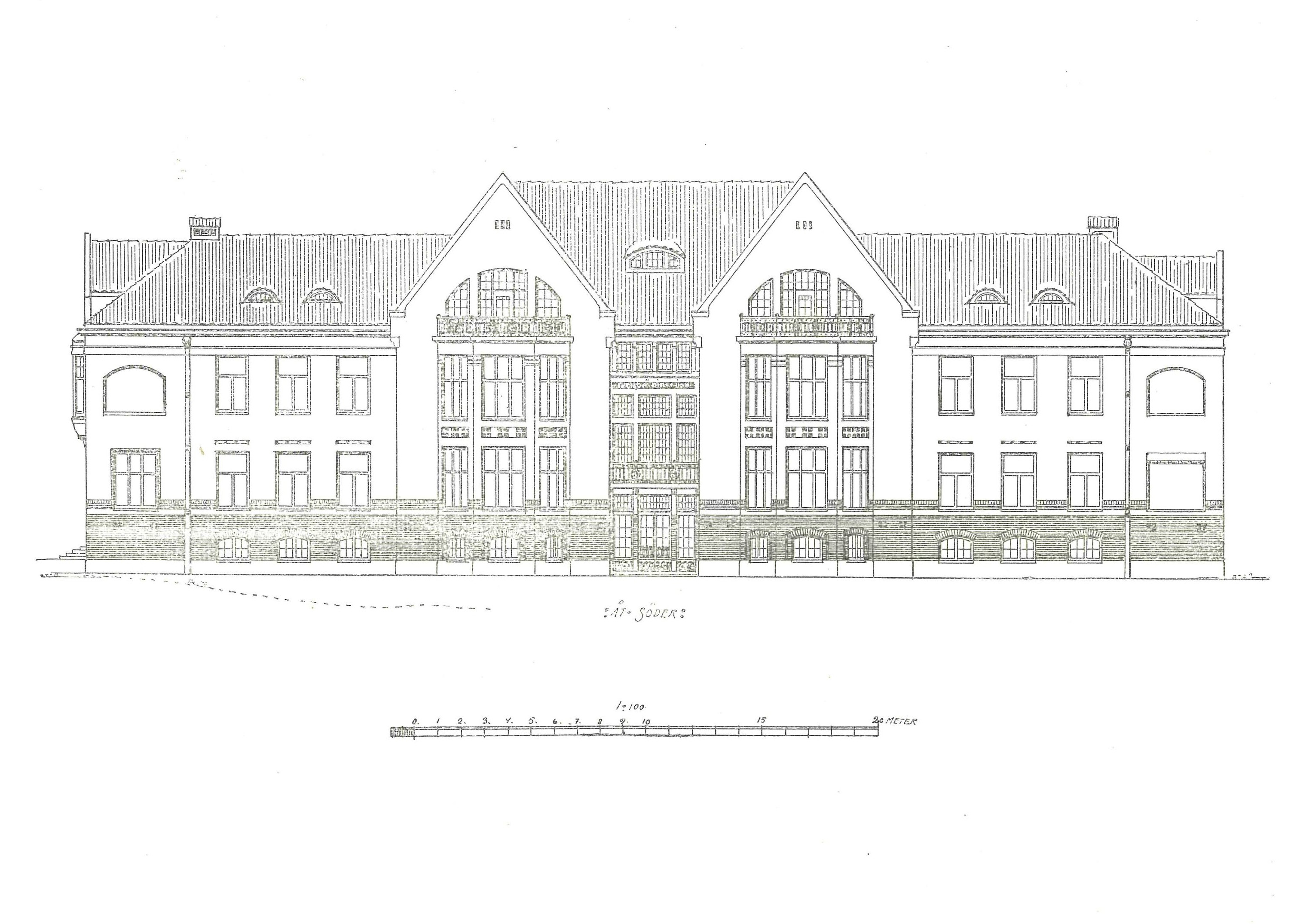
Front

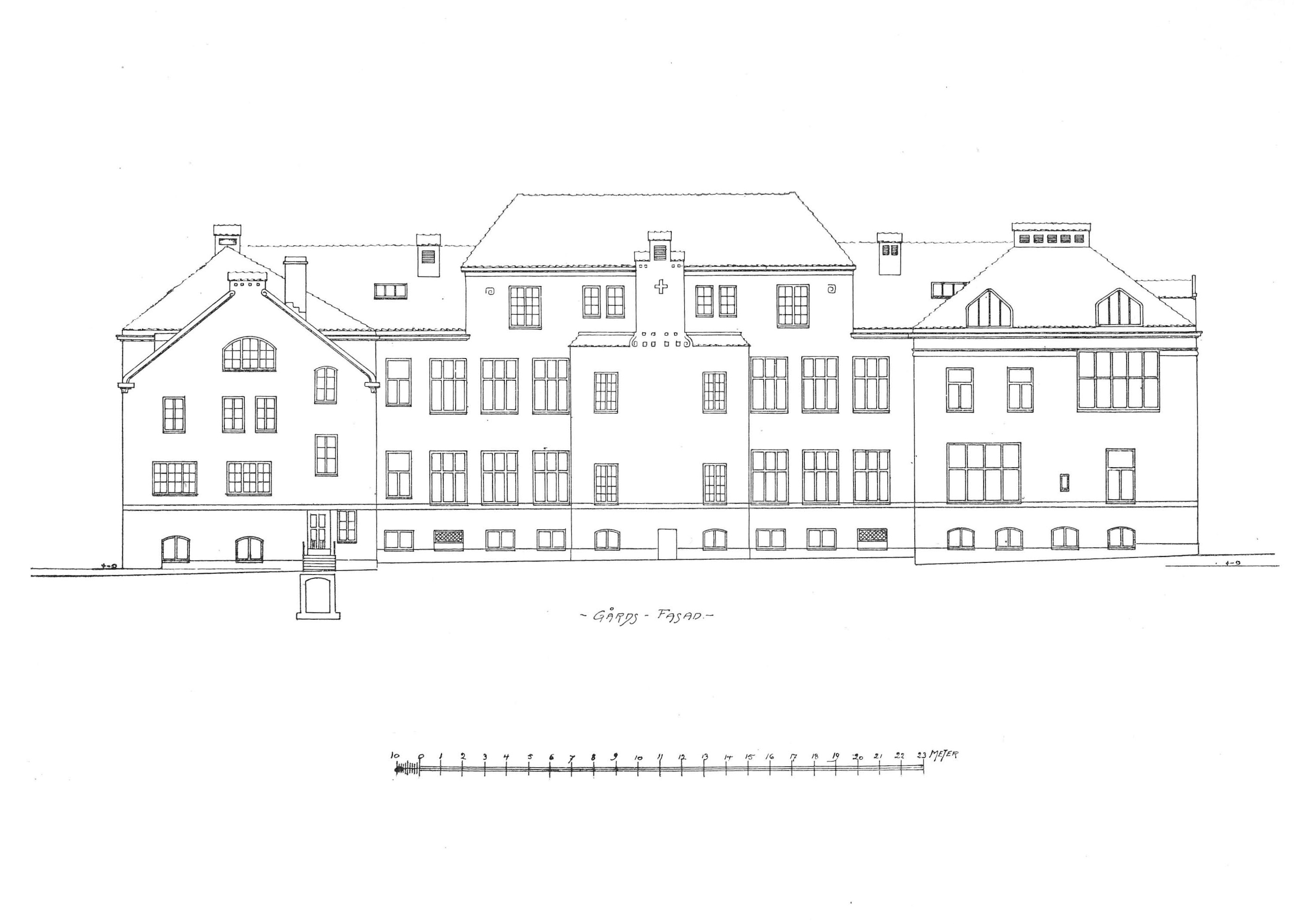
Back

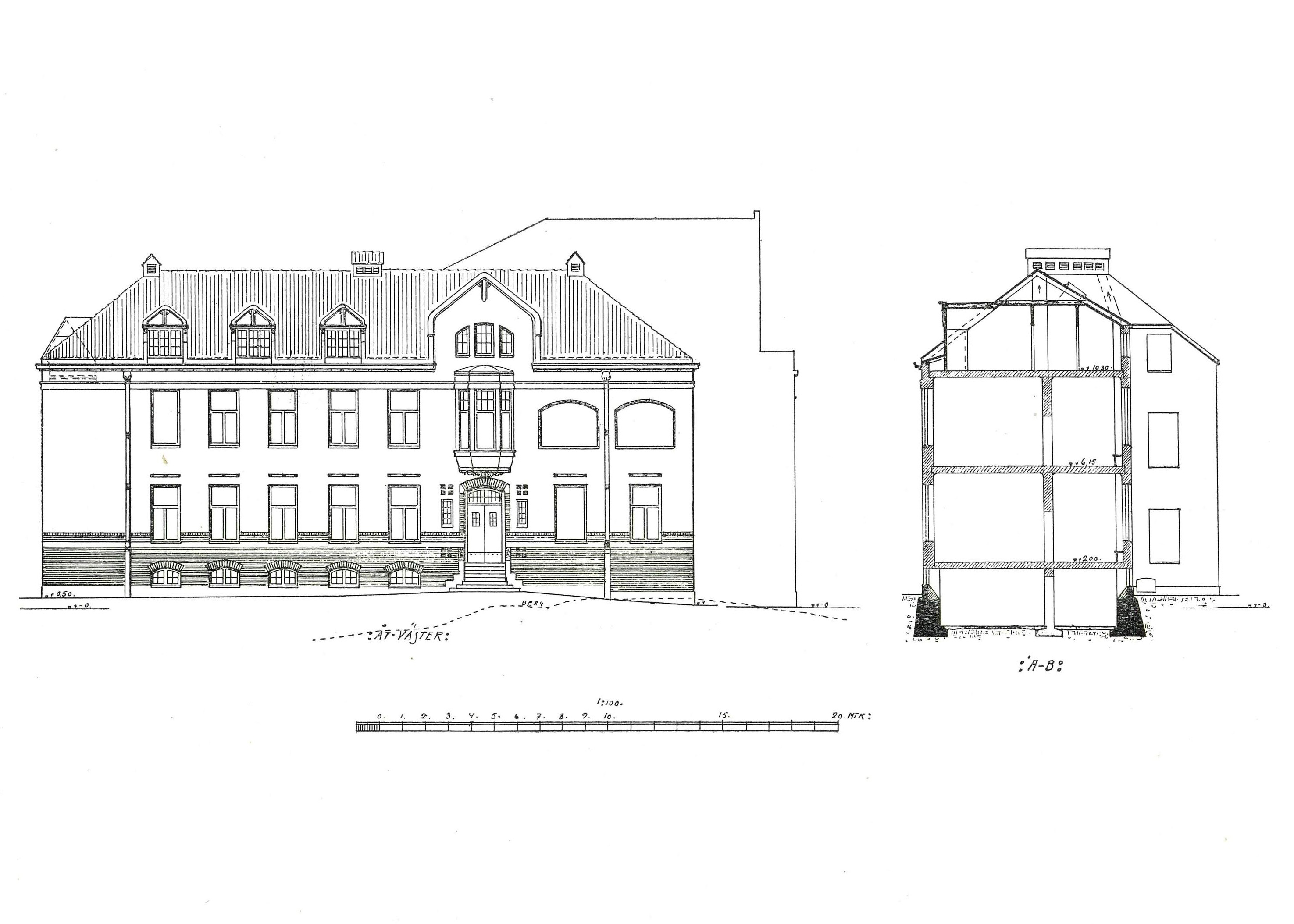
Towards west

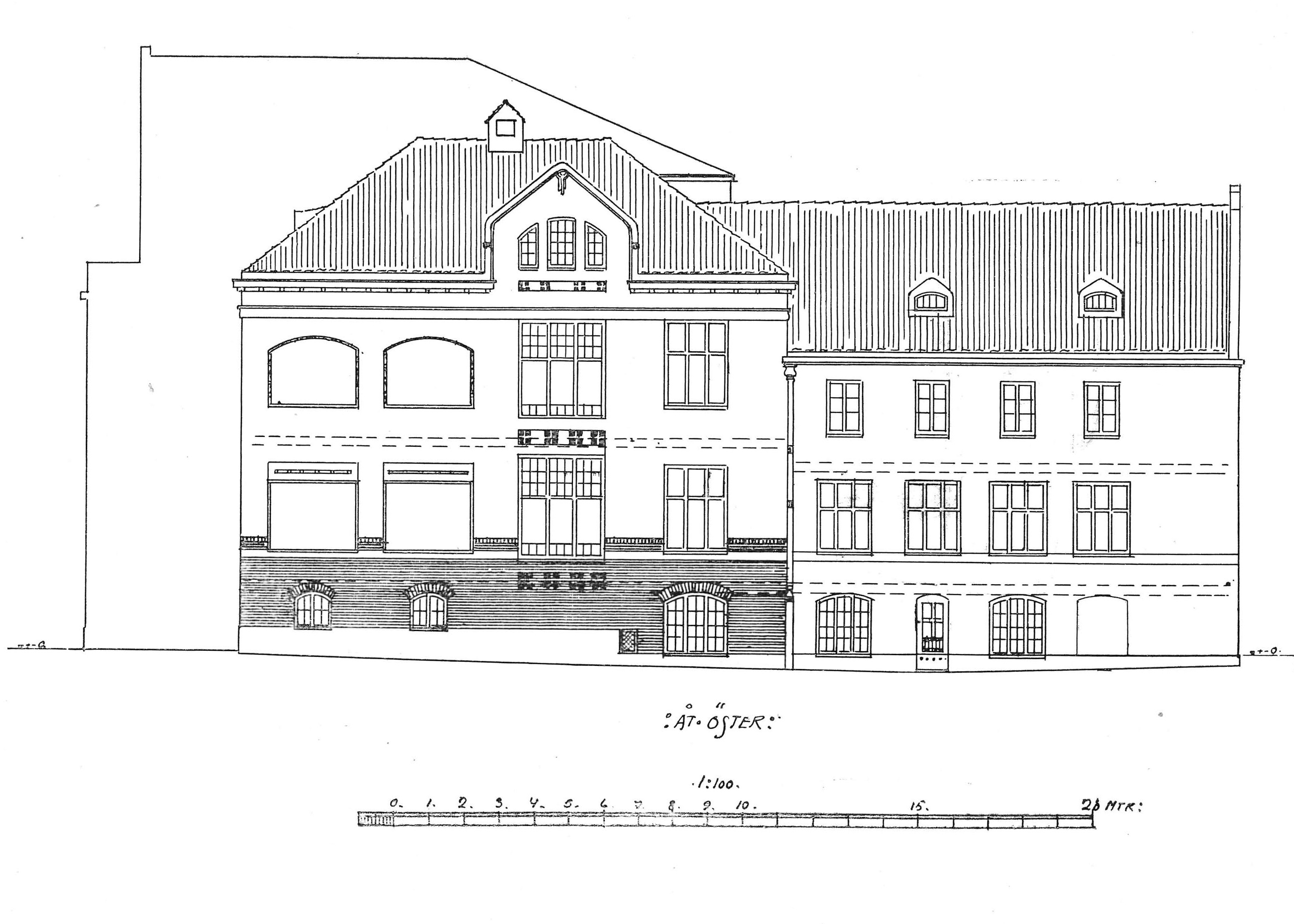
Towards east

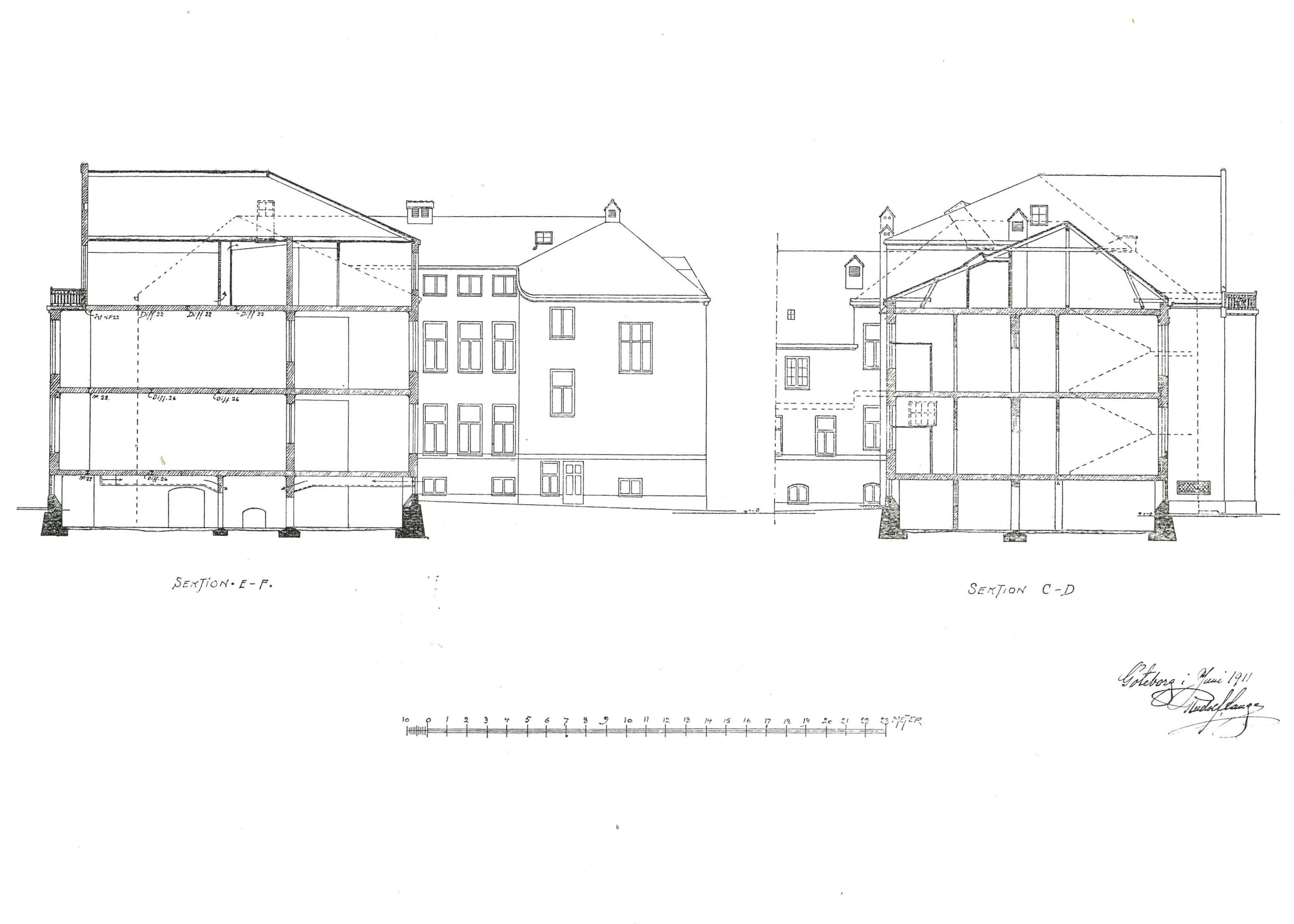
Cross-section

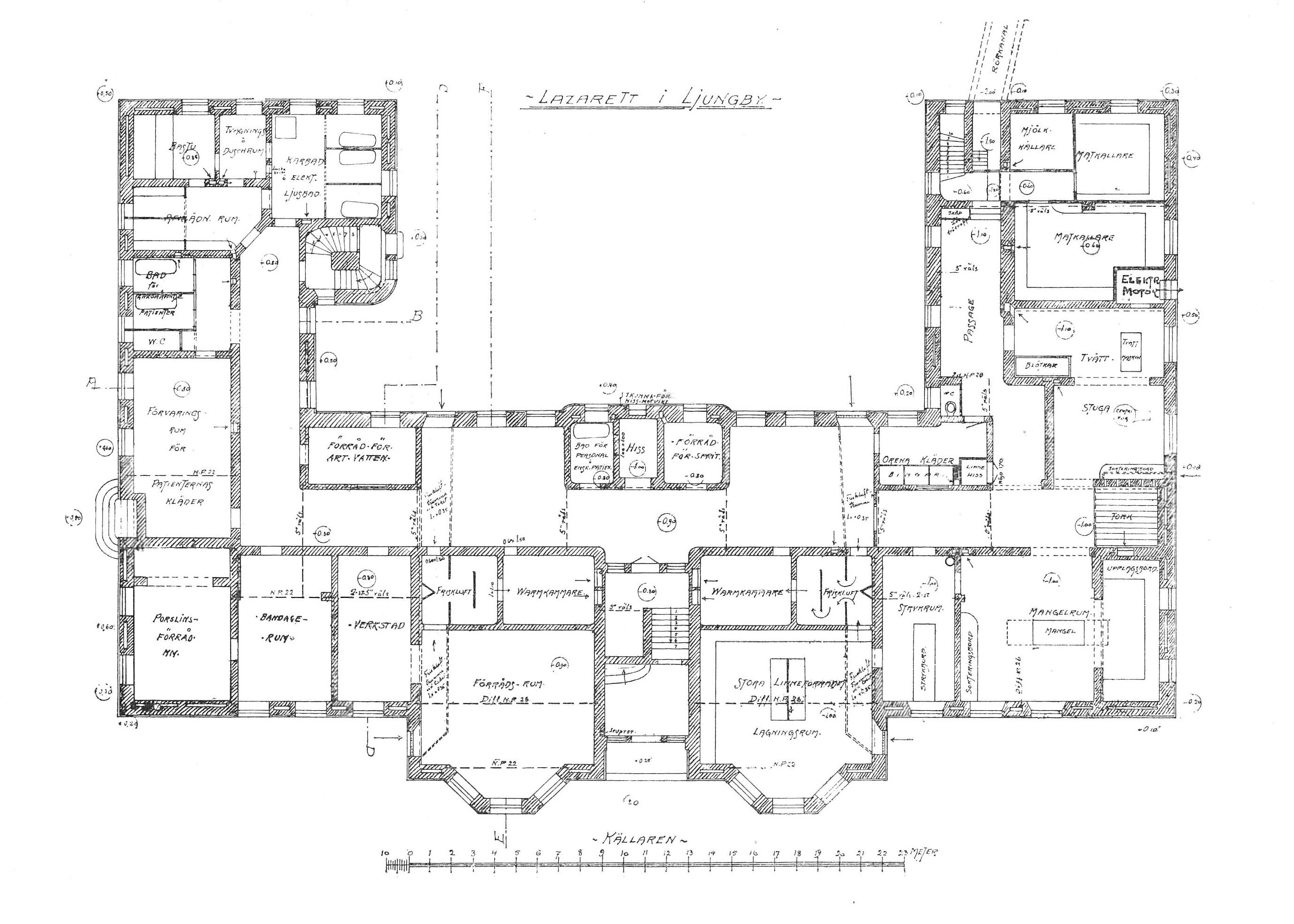
Basement level

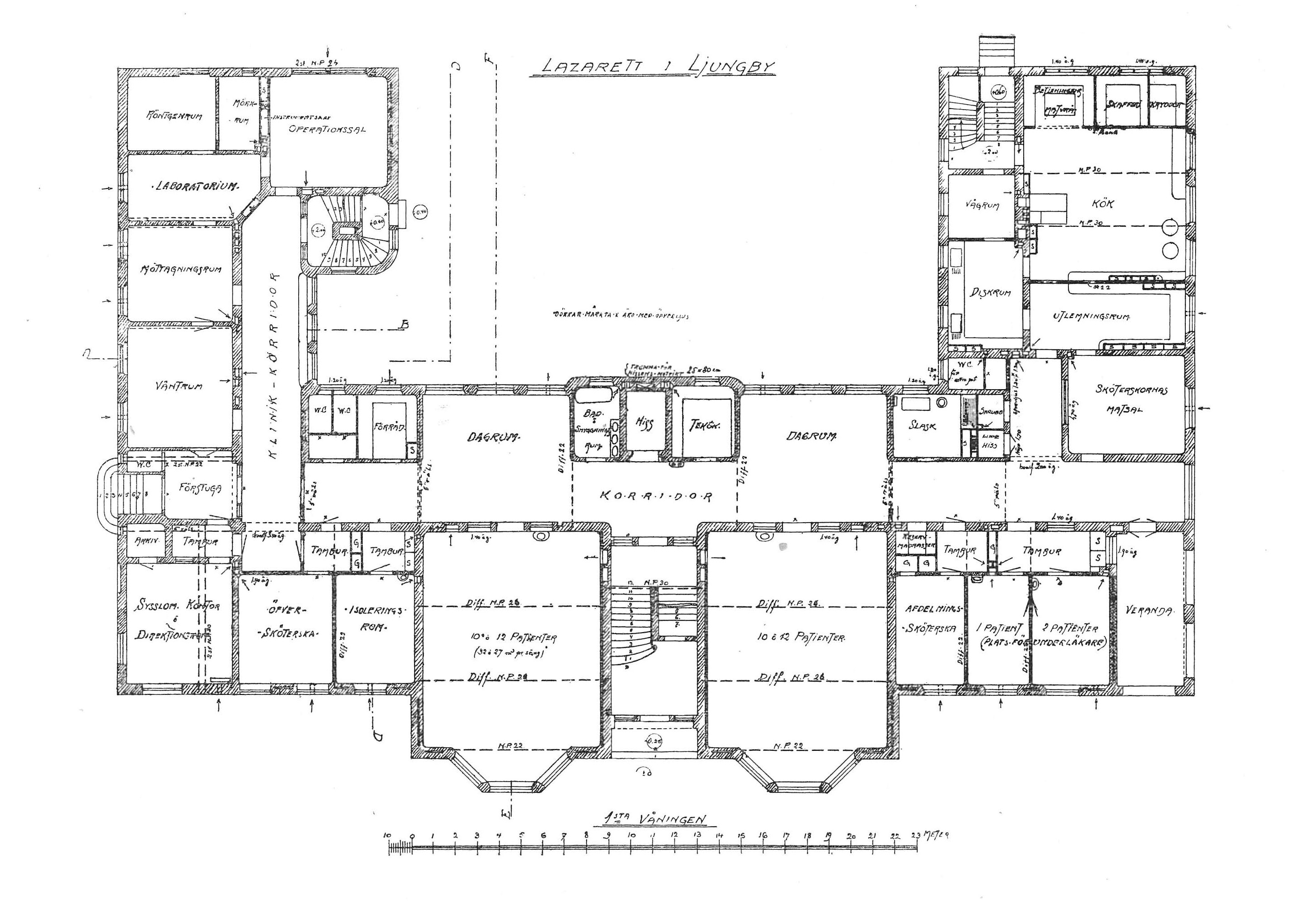
Ground floor

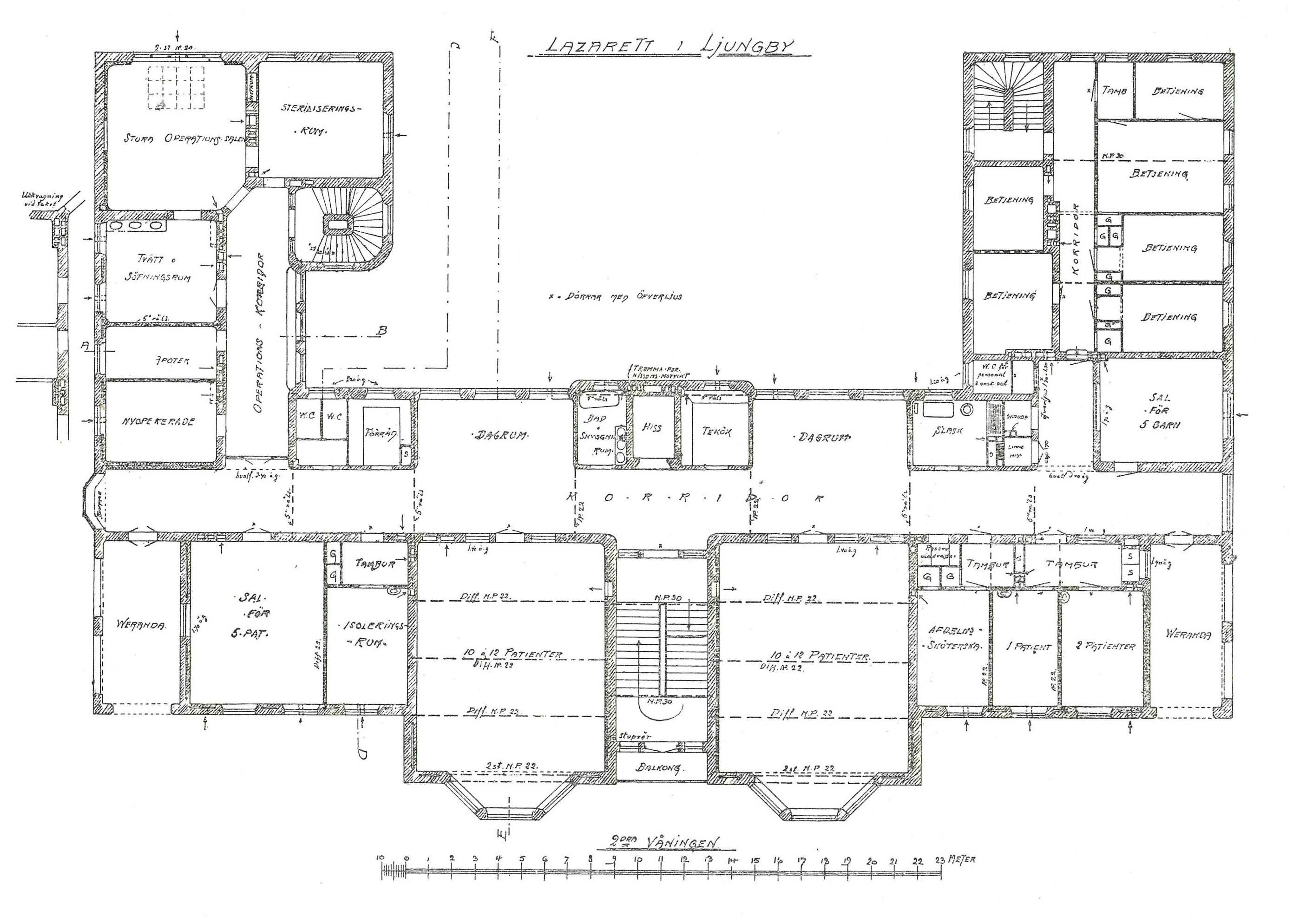
First floor

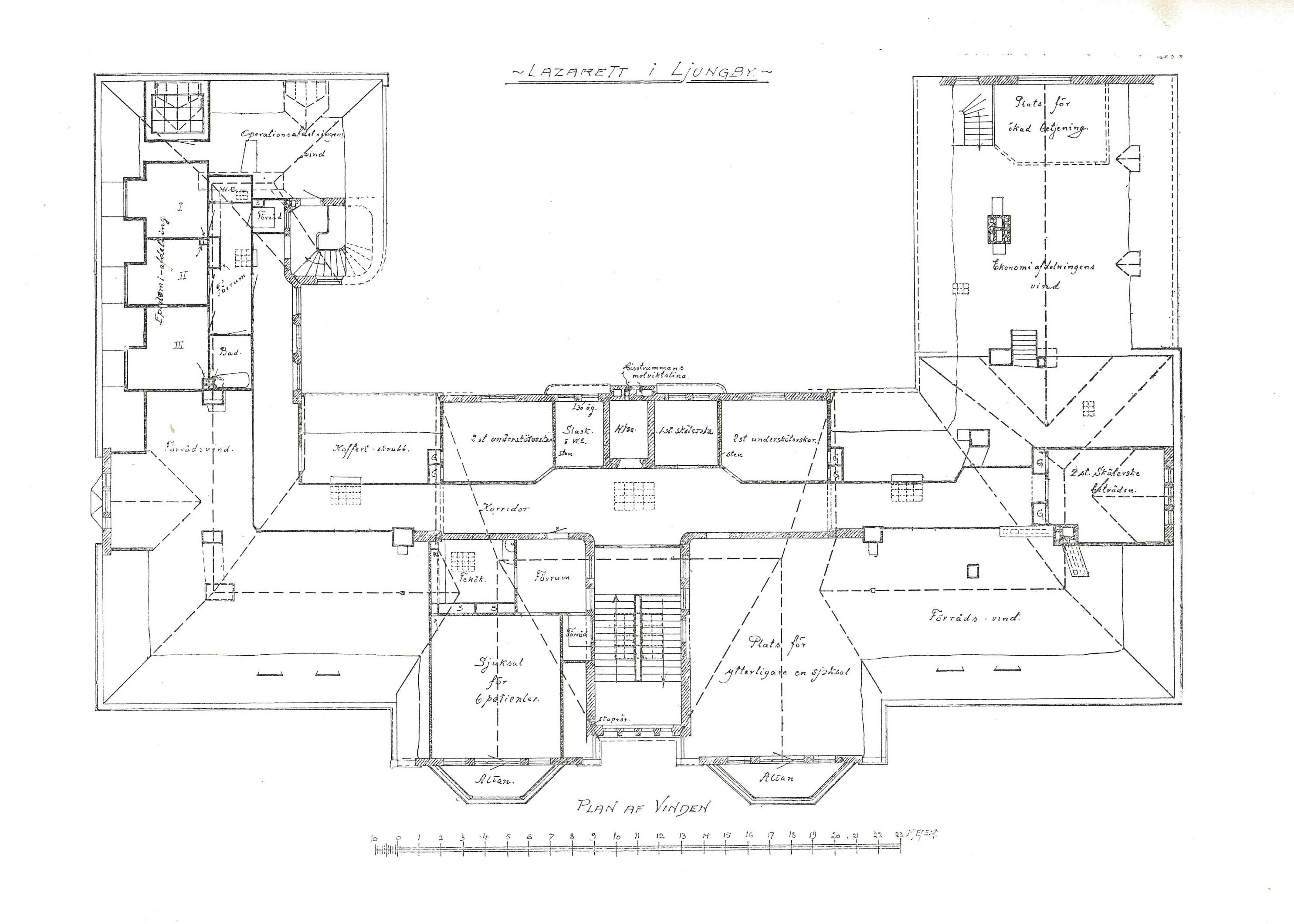
Attic level

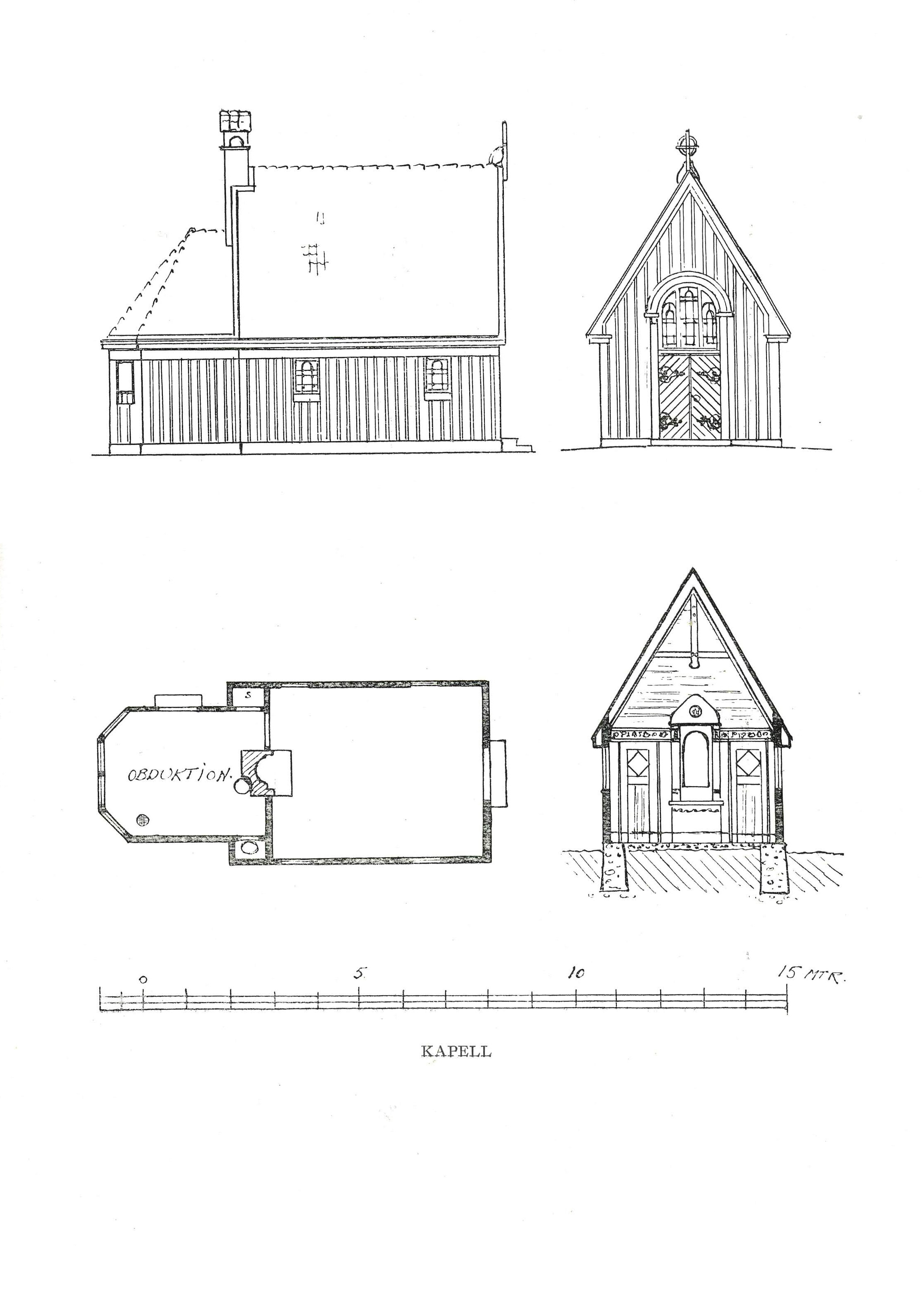
Chapel

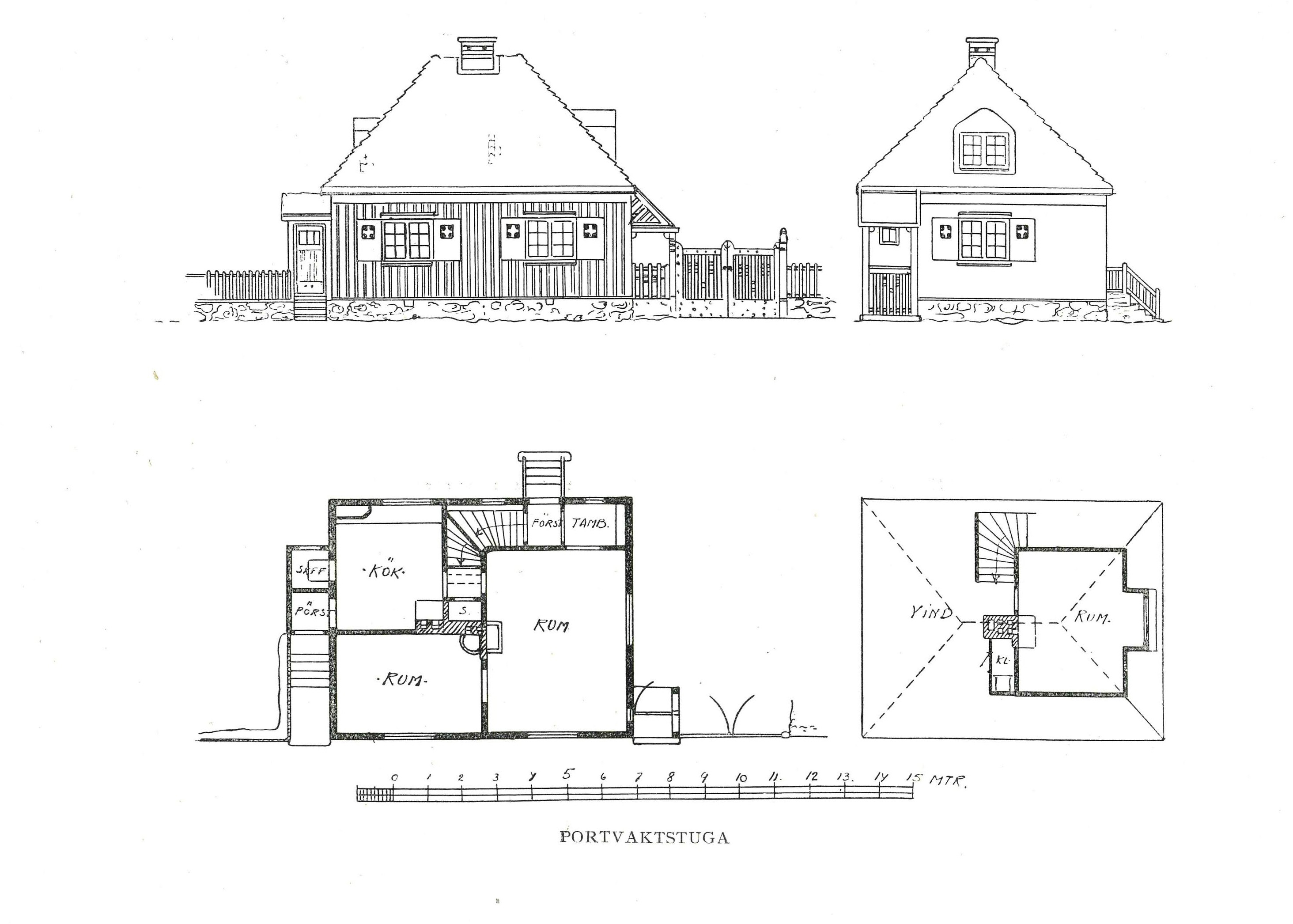
Guardhouse

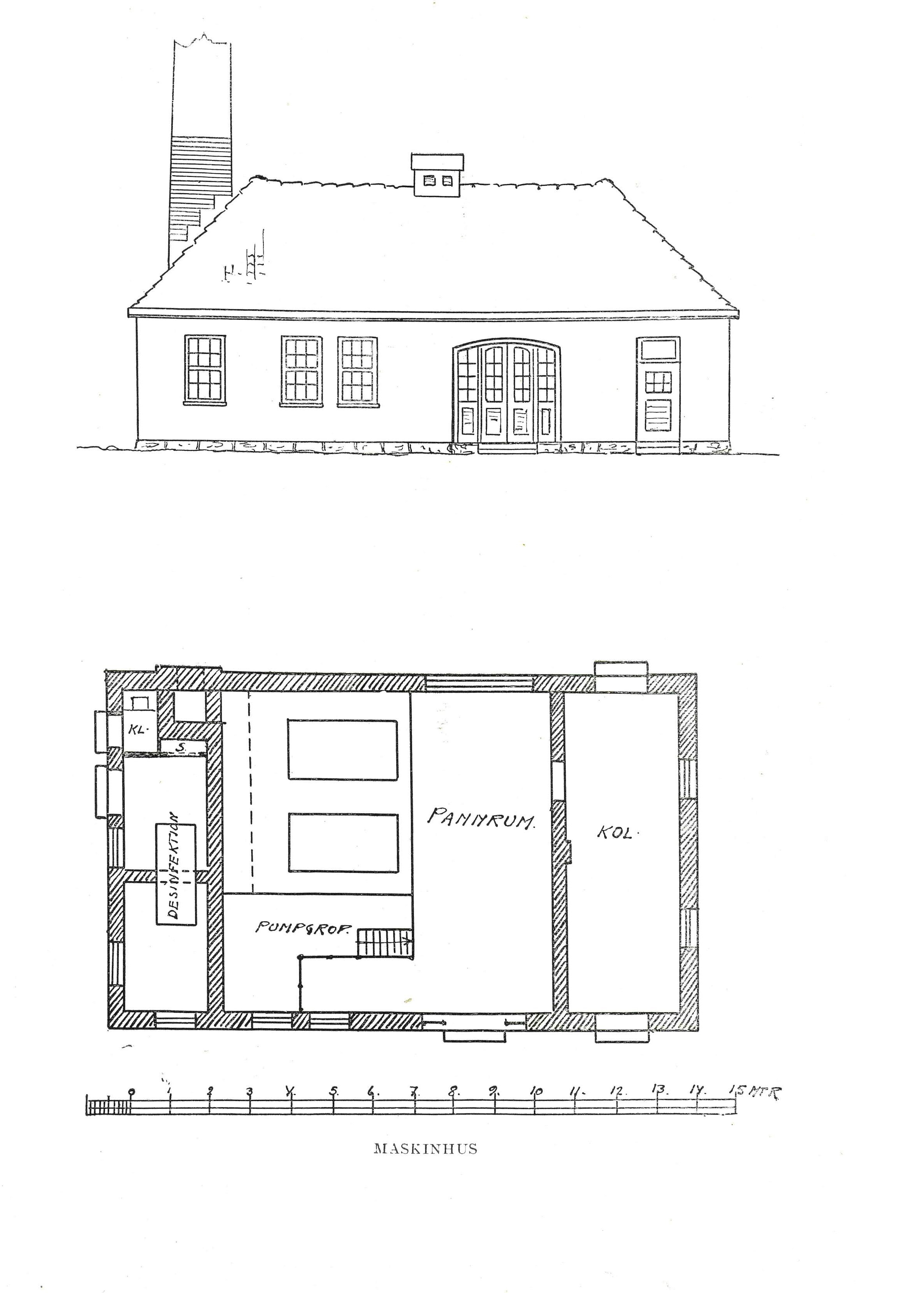
Mechanical house

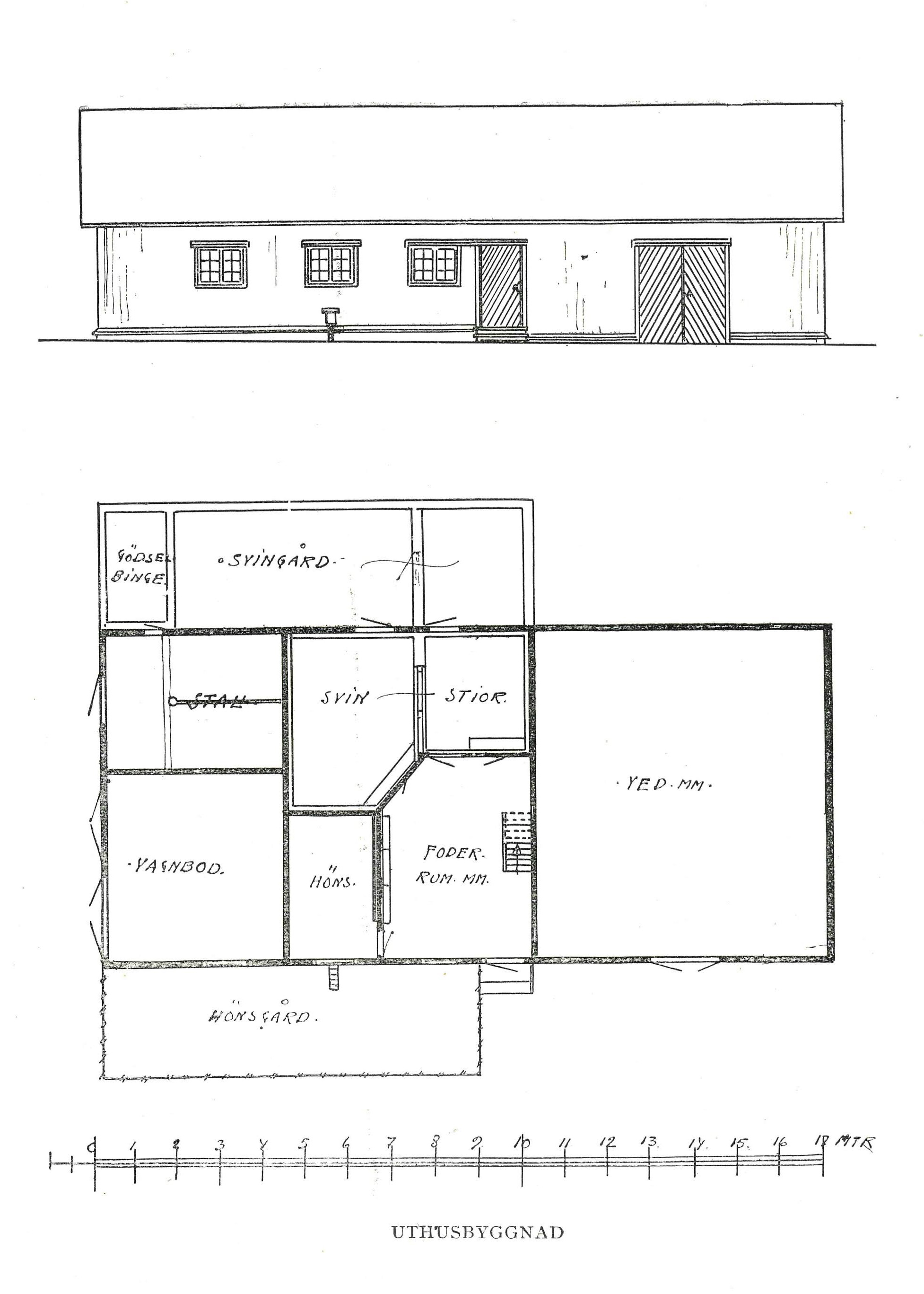
Outbuilding

=== 1955 to 1988 ===
The new hospital was built in three stages. Stage one – surgical department and a nursing ward, x-ray department, plus a birthing center and pediatric ward. Stage two – the isolation hospital would be refurbished to a home for the chronically ill. Stage three, later named Stage II – medical clinic and nursing ward, medical laboratory, and isolation. After the construction of these stages the 1913 hospital buildings would be demolished.

Stage one opened on October 6, 1955 and cost 4.7 million kronor. Stage one was opened a second time on February 11, 1956 by the National Swedish Board of Health director general Artur Engel. In his speech he related to one of his early trips to Ljungby as director general in 1952, "It was quite clear to me that the construction of a new hospital was urgent and should be given priority, not just among the county council's construction companies but before most on a national level." Stage three opened on October 6, 1960 with a speech by Fritiof Karlsson (bf). Thereafter declared interior minister Rune B. Johansson (s) Stage II of the newly constructed hospital open.

As the population of Sunnerbo had several different religious affiliations the hospital board decided in 1988 to start cooperating with the Church of Sweden, then the state church, adapting its operations to cater for different beliefs. The adaptation involved, for instance, traditions before death in Christianity, Judaism, Romani, Islam, and others.
