= Västra Frölunda =

Borough of Gothenburg, Sweden

Coordinates: 57°39′N 11°55′E

Västra Frölunda, sometimes referred to as just Frölunda, is one of 21 boroughs in the city of Gothenburg, Sweden. It is located in the south western part of the city, and is the smallest of the boroughs with a population of 12,855 (2004) on 3.72 square kilometres, although the term Frölunda generally is used for a much wider area covering almost all the city's western suburbs.

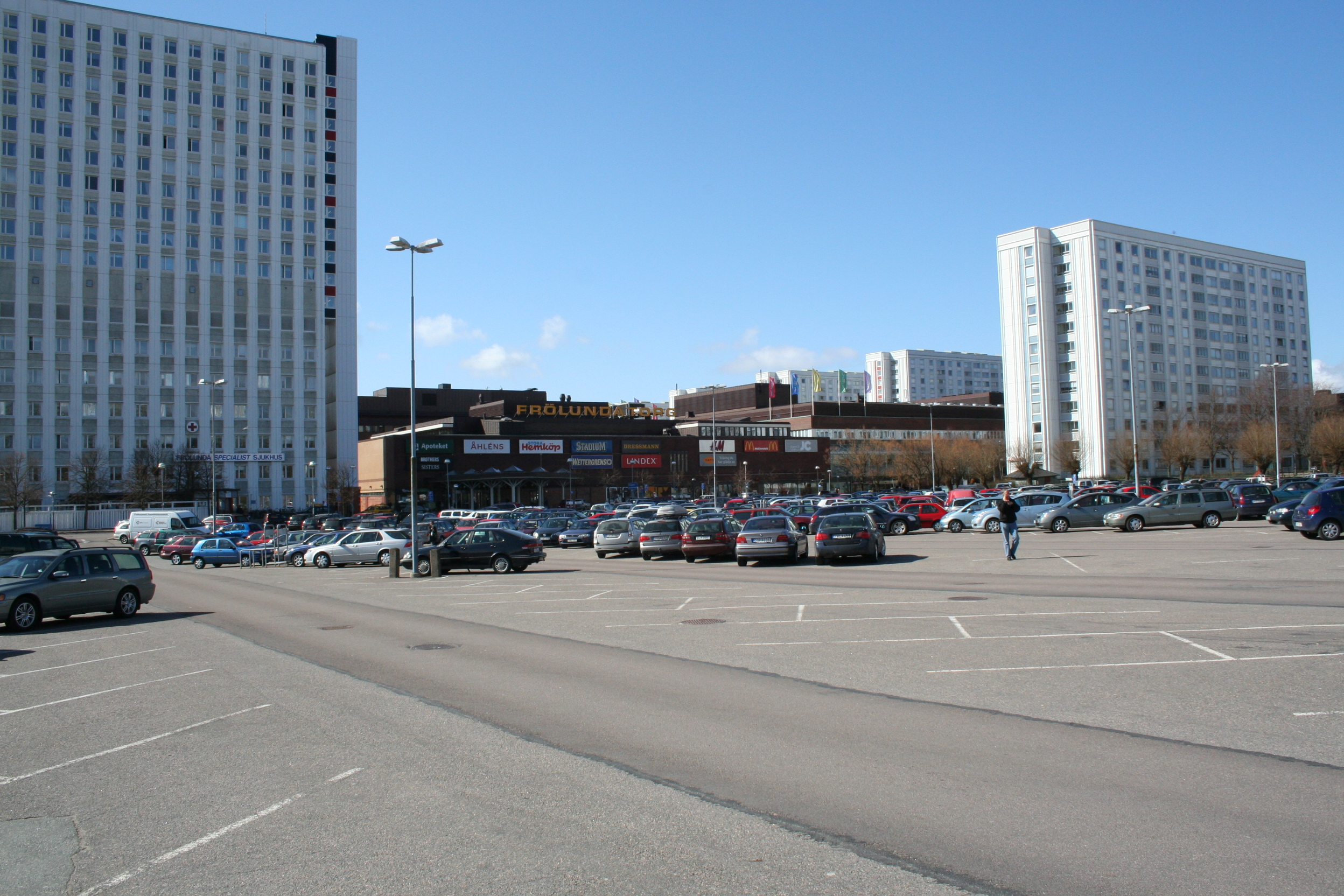
Frölunda Torg

== Sports ==
The following sports clubs are located in Västra Frölunda:

- Assyriska BK
- Utsiktens BK
- Västra Frölunda IF
- Näsets SK
- Älvsborgs FF
- IF Väster

The ice hockey team Frölunda HC is named after Frölunda, but plays in Scandinavium in central Gothenburg.

== See also ==
- Frölunda Specialist Hospital
