= Örebro University Hospital =

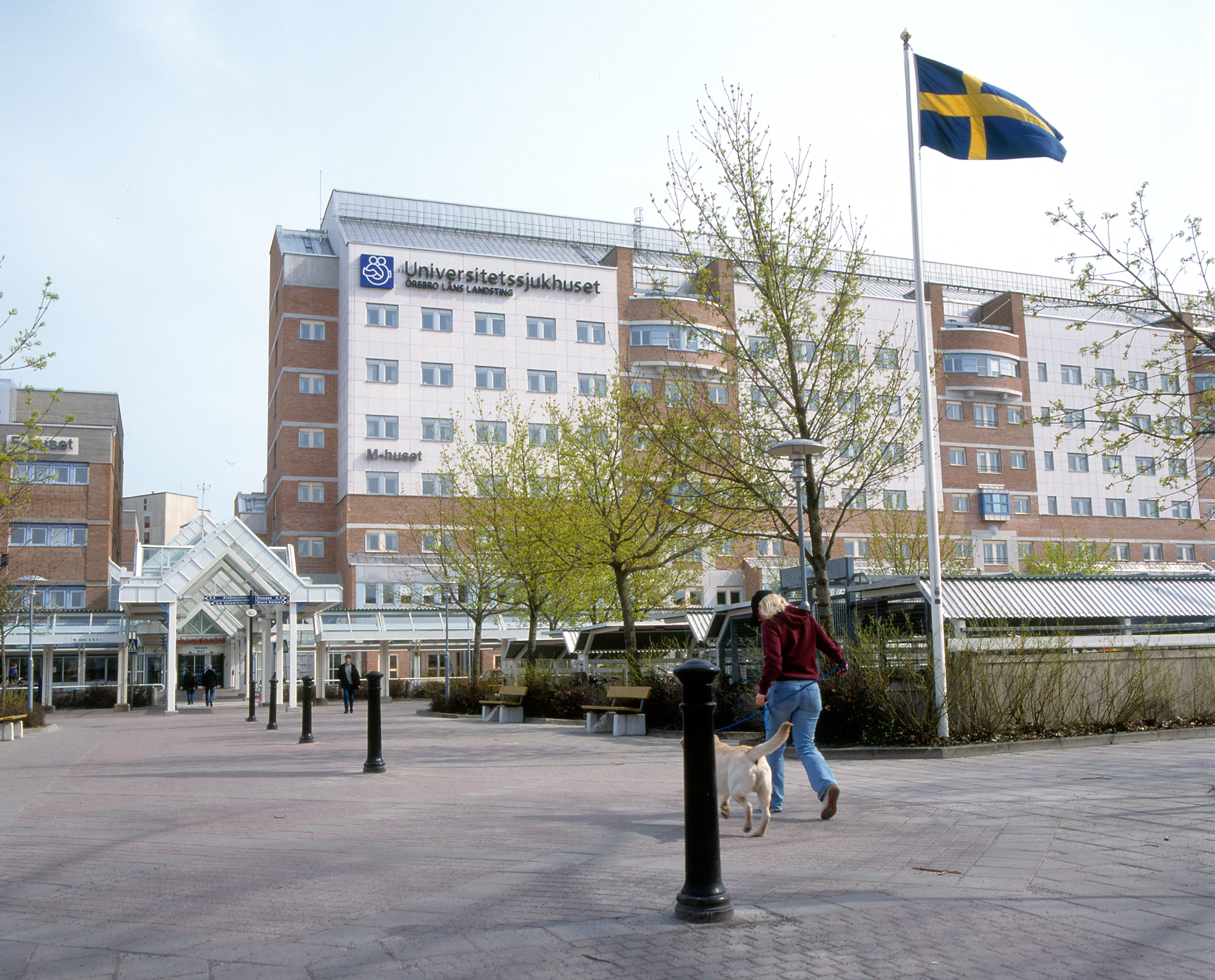
- Hospital main entrance, M-building.

Geography
- Location: Örebro, Örebro County, Sweden
- Coordinates: 59°16′32″N 15°13′30″E

Organisation
- Care system: Public
- Type: Teaching
- Affiliated university: Örebro University

Services
- Emergency department: Yes
- Beds: 462 (2015-02-06)

Helipads
- Helipad: Yes

History
- Founded: 1778 or 1781; 2000 (University Clinic)

Links
- Lists: Hospitals in Sweden

Örebro University Hospital (Swedish: Universitetssjukhuset Örebro, USÖ) is a university hospital in Örebro, Sweden.

The hospital is operated by Region Örebro County and took its current name in 2000, having previously been called Örebro Regional Hospital. The hospital is one of three hospitals within the Örebro County Region, the others being the Karlskoga Hospital and Lindesberg Hospital.

Örebro University, which was awarded full university status in 1999, and the County Council have long tried to establish a governmentally funded medical school in Örebro in collaboration with the hospital. On 30 March 2010, the university was granted the right to award medical degrees, making it the 7th medical school in Sweden.

== Famous births ==
Olle Westling and Ewa Westling's youngest child and only son Prince, Daniel Westling.

Duke of Västergötland & Prince of Sweden, was born on 15 September 1973 at Örebro Hospital.
