= Region Västra Götaland =

Regional council of Västra Götaland County, Sweden

Region Västra Götaland Västra Götalandsregionen
- Regional council
- Formation: 1999
- County: Västra Götaland County
- Country: Sweden
- Website: Official website

Legislative branch
- Legislature: Regional Parliament
- Assembly members: 149
- Meeting place: Vänersborg

Region Västra Götaland (Swedish: Västra Götalandsregionen), is the devolved regional council of Västra Götaland County in Sweden. It was created in 1999 by the merger of the county councils of Gothenburg and Bohus, Älvsborg, and Skaraborg Counties coupled with the devolution of power from the County administrative boards of the same counties, that also merged. Its main responsibilities are the public healthcare system and public transport.

== Parliament ==
The Regional Parliament is located in Vänersborg. Election results 2022

Party	Seats
Socialdemokratiska arbetarpartiet	46
Moderaterna	29
Sverigedemokraterna	24
Vänsterpartiet	16
Centerpartiet	9
Kristdemokraterna	12
Liberalerna	7
Miljöpartiet de gröna	6
Total	149

The Regional Parliament is located in Vänersborg. Election results 2018:

Party	Seats
Socialdemokratiska arbetarpartiet	41
Moderaterna	28
Sverigedemokraterna	20
Vänsterpartiet	15
Centerpartiet	12
Kristdemokraterna	11
Liberalerna	10
Miljöpartiet de gröna	7
Demokraterna	5
Total	149

== See also ==
- Sahlgrenska University Hospital
- NU Hospital Group
- Västtrafik
- Politics of Sweden
- Elections in Sweden
