= Awsworth railway station =

Former railway station in Nottinghamshire, England

Coordinates: 52.99299°N 1.28729°W

Awsworth
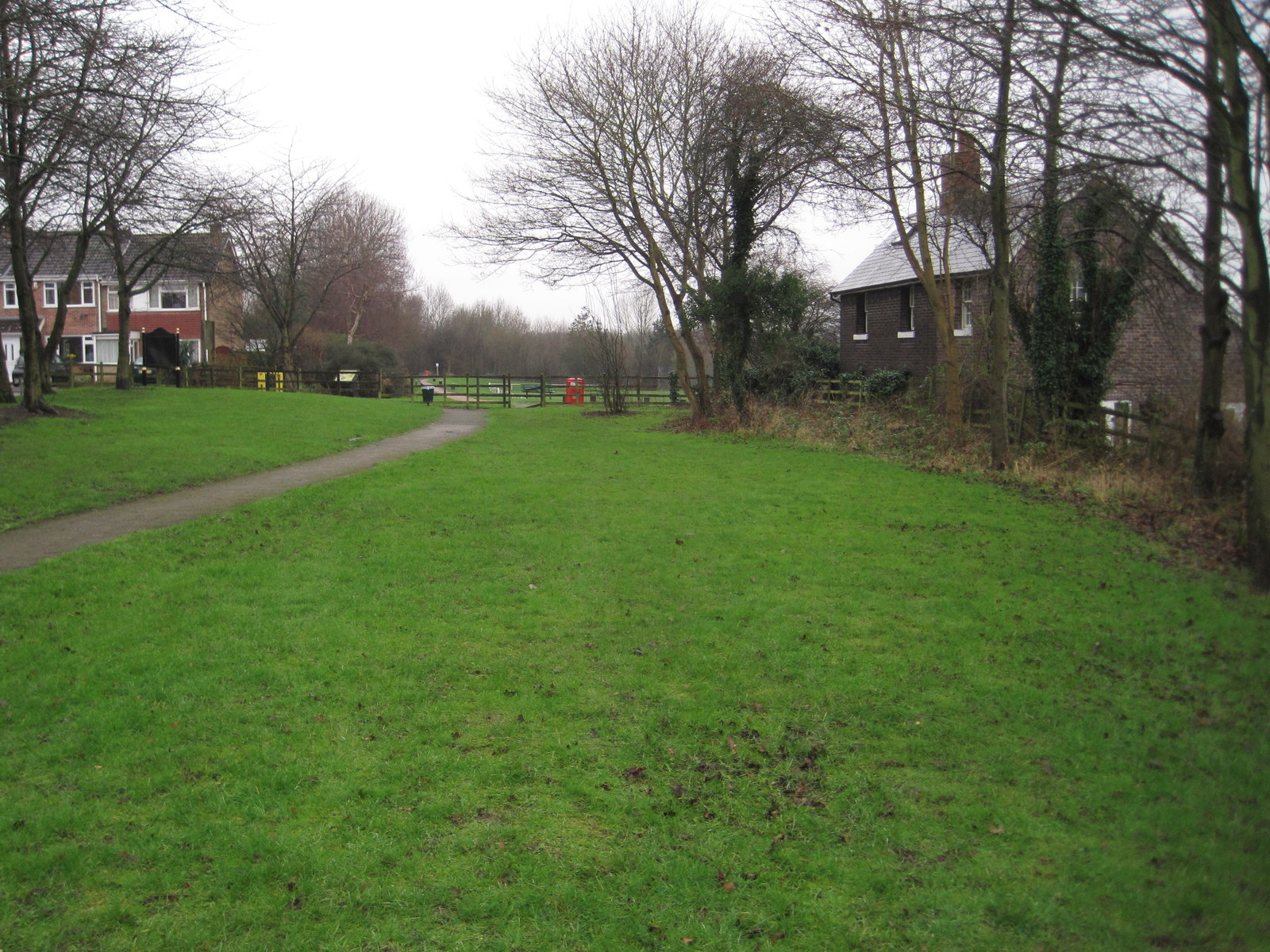
- The site of the station in 2016

General information
- Location: Awsworth, Broxtowe; England
- Grid reference: SK479442
- Platforms: 2

Other information
- Status: Disused

History
- Original company: Great Northern Railway
- Pre-grouping: Great Northern Railway
- Post-grouping: London and North Eastern Railway; London Midland Region of British Railways

Key dates
- 1 November 1880: Station opened
- 7 September 1964: Station closed
Location

Awsworth railway station was a former railway station in Awsworth, Nottinghamshire. It was opened by the Great Northern Railway on its Derbyshire and Staffordshire Extension on 1 November 1880.

== History ==
It was situated on a down grade between Kimberley East railway station and the crossing of the Erewash Valley, which it crossed by means of the impressive Bennerley Viaduct which has been partly preserved. Nearby was Awsworth Junction where a branch led north towards Eastwood and Langley Mill and Pinxton crossing the impressive Giltbrook Viaduct known locally as "Forty Bridges".

Opened by the Great Northern Railway, it became part of the London and North Eastern Railway during the Grouping of 1923. The station then passed to the London Midland Region of British Railways on nationalisation in 1948.

It was then closed by the British Railways Board.

Preceding station	Disused railways	Following station
Kimberley East	London Midland Region of British Railways (Derby) Friargate Line	Ilkeston North

== The site today ==
The site of the station has been redeveloped into a housing estate. Nothing remains of the original station.
