= Giltbrook Viaduct =

- Coordinates: 52.997°N 1.279°W
- Carried: Formerly Great Northern Railway
- Crossed: Awsworth Lane, Two Midland Railway lines, Greasley arm of Nottingham Canal
- Locale: Greasley and Kimberley, Nottinghamshire

Characteristics
- Total length: 1,716 ft (523 m)
- Height: 60 ft (18 m)

History
- Construction start: May 1873
- Construction end: November 1875
- Demolished: 1973

Giltbrook Viaduct was a sigmoid railway viaduct built in the Erewash Valley between Giltbrook and Awsworth Junction in Nottinghamshire.

It was demolished in 1973 to make way for the A610 bypass.

== Origins ==
The viaduct was built between May 1873 and November 1875 and forms part of the Great Northern Railway Derbyshire Extension which was built in part to exploit the coalfields in Derbyshire and Nottinghamshire. The contract was given by the Great Northern Railway (GNR) to Joseph Firbank with the line laid out by, and the viaduct designed by Richard Johnson (Chief Civil Engineer of the GNR); Samuel Abbott was the resident engineer.

At Awsworth Junction the railway branched, one line passed over the Bennerley Viaduct, the other turned North towards Pinxton crossing the Giltbrook Viaduct (or Kimberley Viaduct but known locally as Forty Bridges).

Location of Awsworth Junction

This viaduct was built of red bricks used to create 43 arched spans with a total length of 1,716 feet (523 m) and a height of 60 feet (18 m). The viaduct was S-shaped and built in four sections. The first section consisted of a single 27 feet (8.2 m) long skew span arch crossing Awsworth Lane followed by 13 arches each spanning 30 feet (9.1 m). The second section consisted of one 27 feet (8.2 m) skew span arch over the Midland Railway's Bulwell to Bennerley branch line followed by 15 arches each spanning 30 feet (9.1 m). The third section started with a 27 feet (8.2 m) long skew span arch, skewed in the opposite direction, crossing the Midland Railway's line to Digby Colliery which was immediately to the East of the viaduct followed by 3 arched spans of 30 feet (9.1 m). The fourth section started with a 45 feet (14 m) long segmental arch which crossed the Greasley arm of the Nottingham Canal followed by 8 arched spans 30 feet (9.1 m) long. Each section was separated by stop piers. To the South West of the viaduct next to the Nottingham Canal arm was a Nottingham Gas Light and Coke Company chemical works of which Thomas Hawksley was once the managing engineer.

== Great Midlands Raid ==
Houses were built into arches 8 and 23 counting from the Awsworth end. These dwellings were used as makeshift air raid shelters by school children from Awsworth during a First World war German Zeppelin Airship bombing raid which dropped bombs at Bennerley Junction. This bombing raid was part of what became known as the Great Midlands Raid.
