= Awsworth =

Village in Nottinghamshire, England

Coordinates: 52.9925°N 1.2825°W

- Village and civil parish
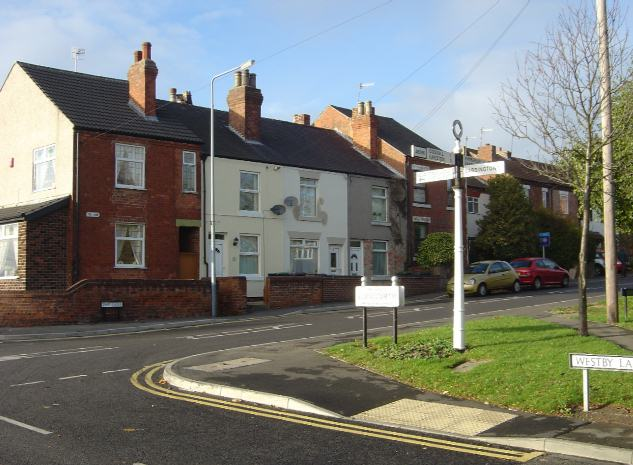
- The crossroads

- Location within Nottinghamshire
- Interactive map of Awsworth
- Area: 1.22 sq mi (3.2 km^{2})
- Population: 2,166 (2021)
  - Density: 1,775/sq mi (685/km^{2})
- OS grid reference: SK 4843
  - London: 115 mi (185 km) SSE
- District: Borough of Broxtowe
- Shire county: Nottinghamshire
- Region: East Midlands
- Country: England
- Sovereign state: United Kingdom
- Post town: Nottingham
- Postcode district: NG16
- Dialling code: 0115
- Police: Nottinghamshire
- Fire: Nottinghamshire
- Ambulance: East Midlands
- UK Parliament: Broxtowe
- Website: www.awsworthparishcouncil.gov.uk

Awsworth is a village and civil parish in the Borough of Broxtowe, Nottinghamshire, England. Its population of 2,266 in the 2001 census and 2,204 in that of 2011, further decreasing to 2,166 for the 2021 census. It is a component of the Greater Nottingham area, between Kimberley, Nottinghamshire and Ilkeston, Derbyshire. It has been a civil parish since 1894.

== History ==
The oldest existing record of Awsworth comes from 1004, when the toponym is listed as Ealdeswy(rðe) in the charter of Æthelred the Unready to Burton Abbey that confirmed Wulfric Spot's bequest of 1002.

== Church ==
The Parish Church of St Peter has a remaining chancel from the brick chapel of 1746. The nave was rebuilt in 1902–1903 by Naylor and Sale of Derby, in a freely adapted Gothic style. A projected north-west tower was never built.

== Railways ==
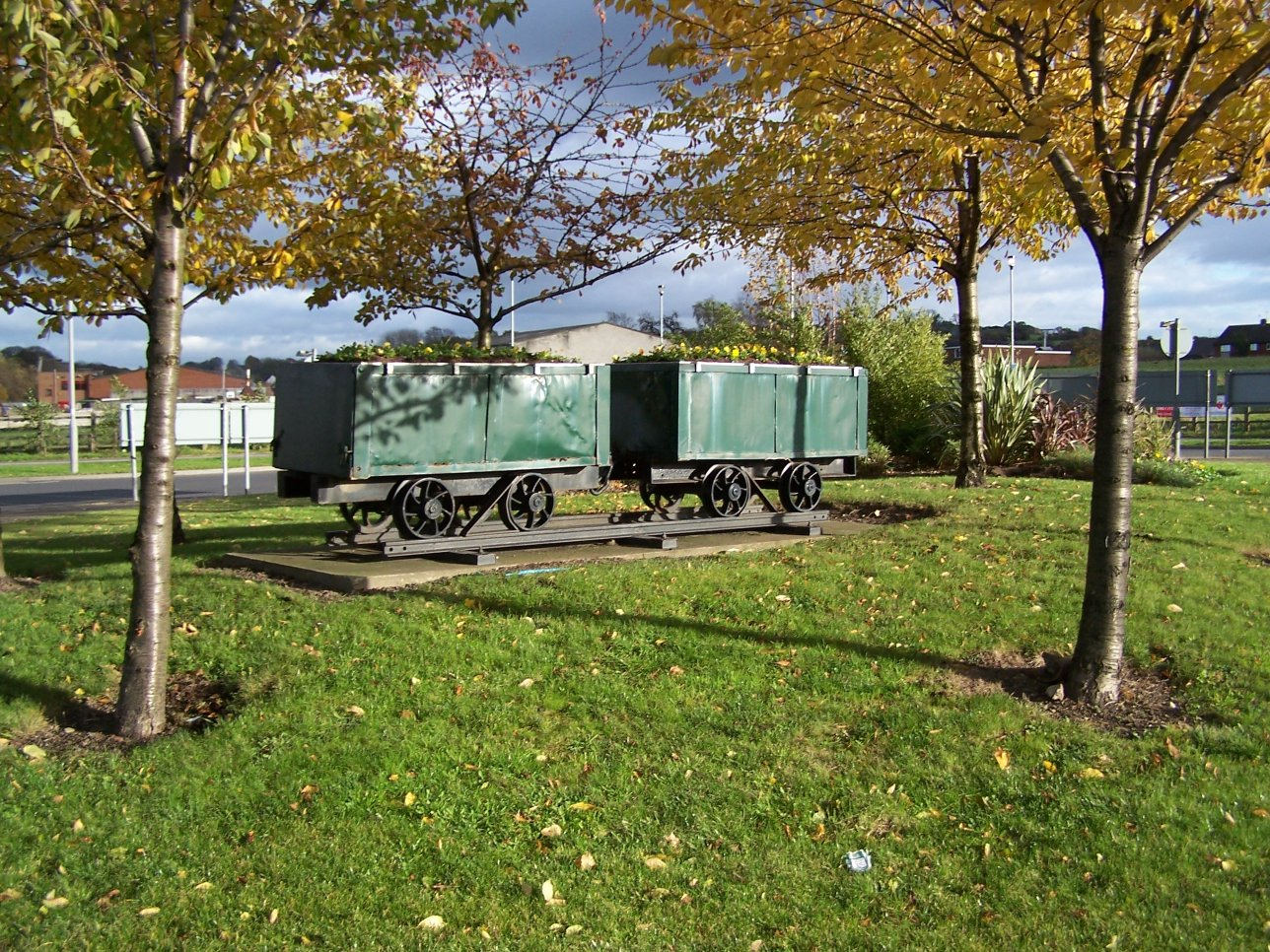
These old colliery wagons stand on a traffic island marking the entrance to Awsworth

Awsworth once had a station on the Great Northern (later LNER) line from Nottingham to Derby, crossing the Erewash Valley to Ilkeston over the Bennerley Viaduct. This closed in September 1964. At Awsworth Junction, a short distance to the east, a branch line curved north to Pinxton. This line closed in January 1963.

Near the junction the line crossed a viaduct almost half a mile in length across the Giltbrook valley. This was known variously as Awsworth Viaduct, Giltbrook Viaduct and Kimberley Viaduct, but commonly by locals as the "Forty Bridges", although the exact number of arches and girder spans was 43. This viaduct has been demolished, but the Bennerley Viaduct remains.

== Coal mining ==
Coal mining in Awsworth is first mentioned c. 1604. In a series of undated letters c. 1601 – c. 1605, Huntingdon Beaumont wrote to his business partner, Sir Percival Willoughby, about having surveyed the coal pit in Awsworth of Sir John Savage (1554–1615) and suggesting that they should ask about leasing the mine.

== Notable residents ==
- Arthur Burrows, Nottinghamshire cricketer
- Samuel Chambers, miner and unjustly transported convict

== See also ==
- Listed buildings in Awsworth
