= Samuel Abbott (engineer) =

English railway engineer

Samuel Abbott, MICE was an English railway engineer, born in Calverton, Nottinghamshire on 28 March 1842 and died in Buenos Aires on 17 May 1890. Samuel Abbott was the general manager of the Buenos Aires Great Southern Railway at the time of his death.

== Life ==
He was born in 1842, the son of Evelyn Abbott (1811-1871) and Mary Lamb (1815-1898).

He married Jane Robins Robins (1844-1914) on 30 July 1872 at St Jude’s Church, East Brixton, London, and they had the following children:

- Evelyn Robins Abbott (1873-1950)
- Thomas Robert Lamb Abbott (1875-1909)
- Samuel Herbert Lee Abbott (1877-1951)
- Reginald Stuart Abbott (b. 1883)
- Albert Victor Abbott (b. 1885)
- Victoria Mary Abbott (b. 1888)

He died of Typhoid at the age of 49 and was buried at Cementerio de la Chacarita, Ciudad Autónoma de Buenos Aires, Capital Federal, Argentina.

== Career ==
Samuel Abbott was educated at Lincoln Grammar School after which he joined the engineering staff of the Great Northern Railway under Richard Johnson in 1864. In 1867 he was appointed to supervise the erection of several large bridges on the Transcaucasian Railway between Poti and Tiflis and then employed preparing plans for an extension from Tiflis to Baku.

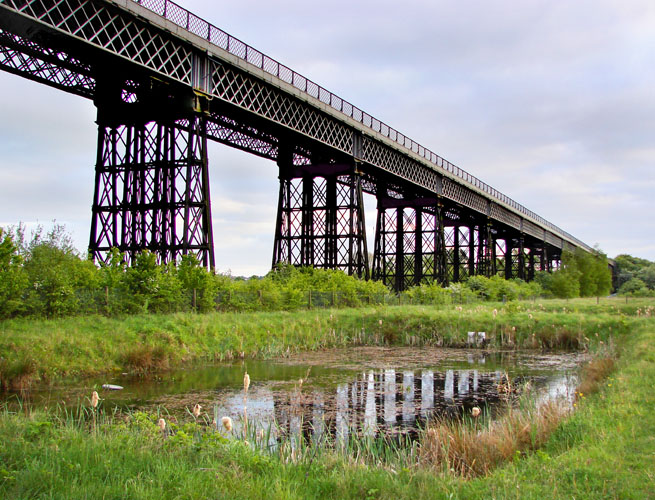
Bennerley Viaduct

Abbott returned to England and rejoined the staff of Richard Johnson at the Great Northern Railway in 1871 where he laid out the line and prepared plans for the Derbyshire and Staffordshire extension. Abbott was appointed resident engineer for the section of line between Awsworth Junction in Nottinghamshire and Egginton Junction in North Staffordshire; including Bennerley Viaduct and Friargate Bridge.

After completion of the Derbyshire and Staffordshire extension, Abbott was transferred to Lincoln as the resident engineer for the northern section of the Great Northern and Great Eastern Joint Railway; designing and superintending the construction of 20 miles of that railway between Market Rasen and Grimsby

After resigning from the Great Northern Railway, Abbott joined the Buenos Aires Great Southern Railway in 1885, rising to the position of general manager.
