= Listed buildings in Awsworth =

Awsworth is a civil parish in the Borough of Broxtowe, Nottinghamshire, England. The parish contains four listed buildings that are recorded in the National Heritage List for England. Of these, one is listed at Grade II*, the middle of the three grades, and the others are at Grade II, the lowest grade. The parish contains the village of Awsworth and the surrounding area, and the listed buildings consist of a railway viaduct, a school and associated structures, and a war memorial.

== Key ==
Grade	Criteria
II*	Particularly important buildings of more than special interest
II	Buildings of national importance and special interest

== Buildings ==
Name and location	Photograph	Date	Notes	Grade
Bennerley Viaduct; 52.98966°N 1.29766°W		1877	The viaduct was built by the Great Northern Railway to carry its Derbyshire and Staffordshire extension over the valley of the River Erewash, and is now disused. The viaduct is a lattice truss bridge in wrought iron, consisting of 16 lattice deck spans on 15 latticework piers. These have foundations in concrete, blue brick and stone, and at the ends are support structures in brick. The viaduct is 433 metres (1,421 ft) long, and over 18 metres (59 ft) above the river.	II*
Infant School; 52.99117°N 1.28242°W	—	1878	The school is in red brick on a chamfered plinth, with dressings in stone and yellow terracotta, egg and dart moulded gable eaves and a slate roof with ornate ridge tiles and finials. On the front are two projecting bays with pedimented gables containing tall windows with segmental heads, moulded terracotta imposts, and moulded lintels. Above each window is a lettered band and in the gable is a circular window with four keystones. On the roof are two cupolas.	II
Walls, railings and covered playground, Infant School; 52.99117°N 1.28205°W	—	1878	The covered playground to the rear of the school is in red brick with stone dressings, and a hipped slate roof with ornate ridge tiles and terracotta finials. The south front is open and carried on five cast iron columns. Enclosing the playground is a coped brick wall containing brick [piers with stone caps, along the front of the school the wall is low, with iron railings.	II
Awsworth War Memorial; 52.99200°N 1.28282°W	—	1920	The war memorial is in the churchyard of St Peter's Church, and is in limestone. It consists of an obelisk on a square plinth, a two-tier base and a two-tier platform. On the front of the plinth is an inscription and a carving in relief, and on the base are more inscriptions and the names of those lost in the two World Wars.	II
