= St John the Evangelist's Church, Derby =

St John the Evangelist’s Church, Derby
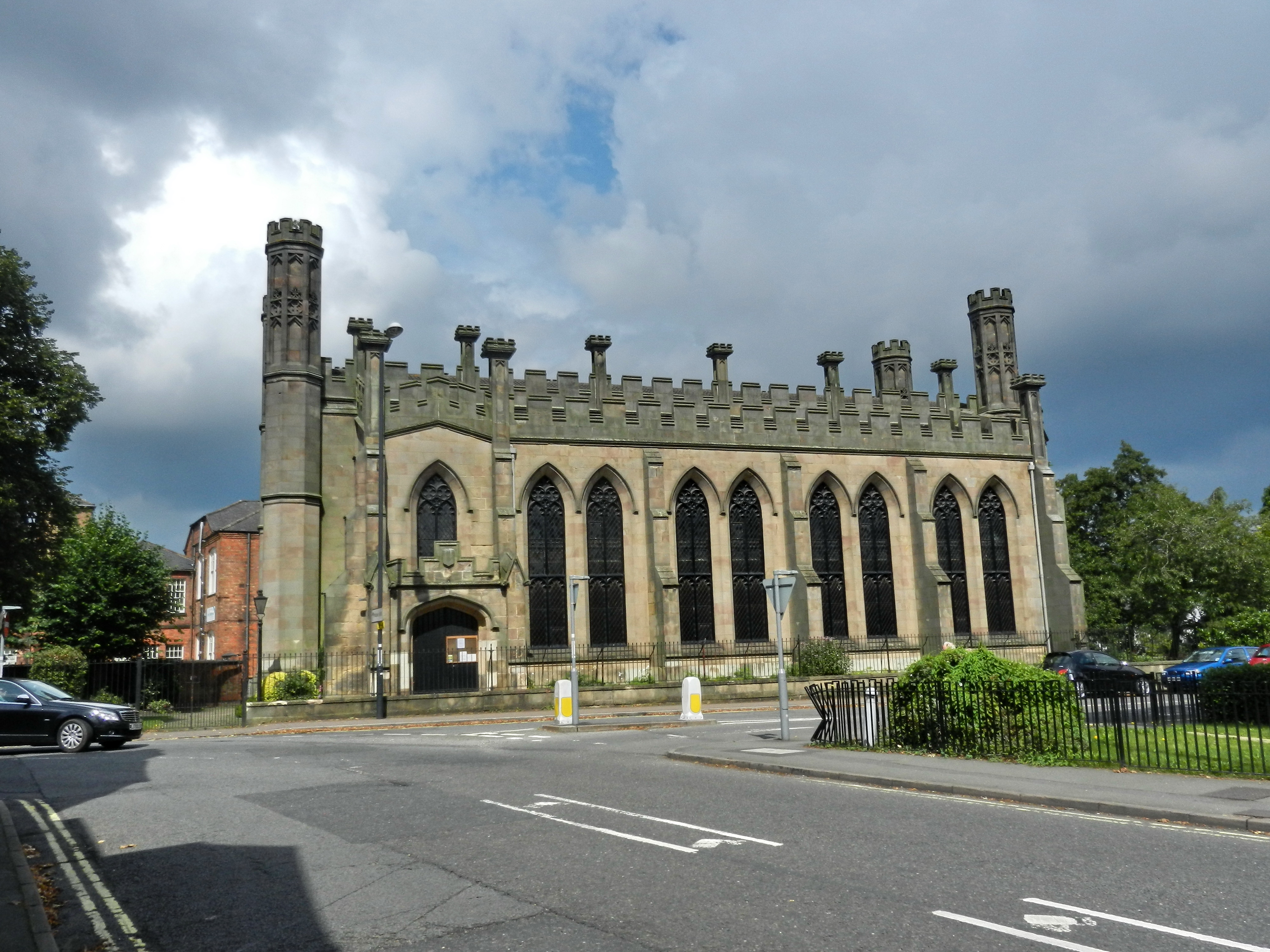
- St John the Evangelist’s Church, Derby
- St John the Evangelist’s Church, Derby
- 52°55′32.93″N 1°29′16.77″W
- OS grid reference: SK 34518 36612
- Location: Derby, Derbyshire
- Country: England
- Denomination: Church of England

History
- Dedication: St John the Evangelist

Architecture
- Heritage designation: Grade II* listed
- Architect: Francis Goodwin
- Groundbreaking: 14 September 1826
- Completed: 1828

Administration
- Diocese: Diocese of Derby
- Archdeaconry: Derby
- Deanery: Derby North
- Parish: St John the Evangelist, Derby

St John the Evangelist's Church, Derby is a Grade II* listed parish church in the Church of England in Derby.

== History ==
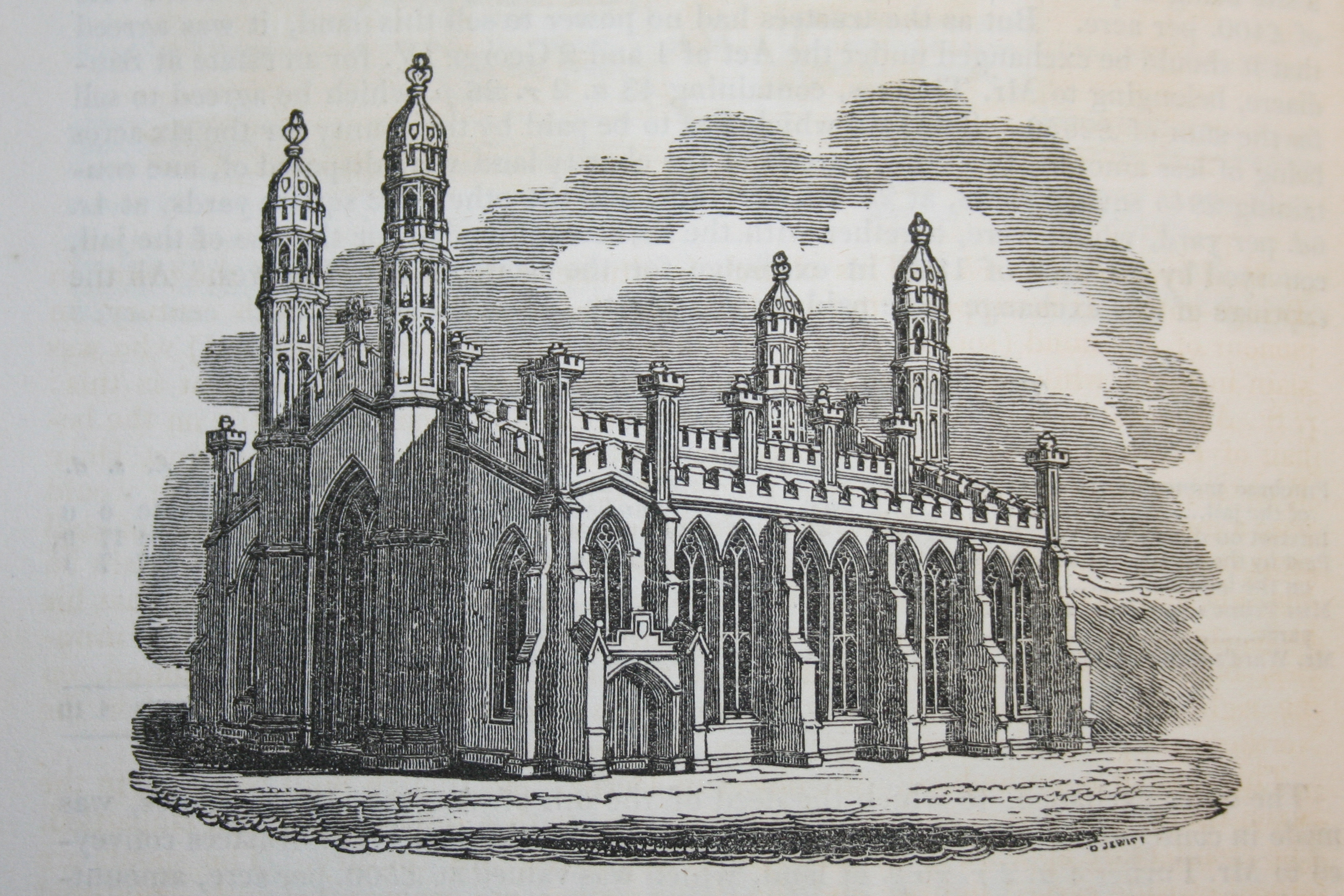
The church before 1833

The architect for the church was Francis Goodwin. The foundation stone was laid on Thursday 14 September 1826.

It is a Gothic box shape with four tall corner turrets. The interior has galleries on each side, and the apsidal chancel dates is a later addition from 1871.

In 1891 the chancel was extended by 10 feet, and the floor of the chancel raised to give those in the galleries a better view. The heating and lighting were also improved at the same time. A new stained glass window by Ward and Hughes was installed, and the organ was improved by Charles Lloyd of Nottingham. The cost of the works was around £1,820 (equivalent to £199,931 in 2025).

In 1902 further works were carried where the exterior was repaired, and the upper stonework was taken down and adjusted. The interior of the building was cleaned and painted.

== Organ ==
The church contains an organ dating from 1875 by Henry Willis. A specification of the organ can be found on the National Pipe Organ Register. In 1836 Gray and Davison supplied a second hand organ for £177 local legend has it that this organ came from the Theatre Royal Dury Lane, the theatre did hire an "oratorio organ from Gray and Davison until 1834 so may be true(presumably the one referred to above as improved by Lloyd and Dudgeon)

=== Organists ===
- J. Norton ca. 1838, ca. 1846
- W. H. Orme
- Charles Drew 1868 - 1886
- Thomas Archer 1886 - 1923
- H.E Oldfield ca. 1928 ca. 1940
- Frederick J. Stevenson 1944 - ca. 1952 (formerly organist at St James' Church, Derby)
- John Gold..??
- Hedley Taylor until 1962
- Christopher Lyndon-Gee c.1965
- Terry Worroll ca. 1968 - 1970
- TMN Whitehall 1970 - 1973 (Martyn R Warsop assistant)
- David S Johnson 1973 - ca. 1984
- Andrew Storer from 1995

== See also ==
- Grade II* listed buildings in Derby
- Listed buildings in Derby (northern area)
