= Listed buildings in Derby (northern area) =

The area to the north and northwest of the centre of the city of Derby, England, contains 76 listed buildings that are recorded in the National Heritage List for England. Of these, three are listed at Grade I, the highest of the three grades, ten are at Grade II*, the middle grade, and the others are at Grade II, the lowest grade. The area is largely residential, and it contains some industry, mainly in former silk mills, and the Midland Railway had a goods yard in the area. Most of the listed buildings are houses and associated structures. Some of the former mills are listed, together with buildings in the Midland Railway goods yard. The other listed buildings include churches and chapels, public houses and a hotel, shops, bridges, the remains of a cross, a well, a convent, street bollards, war memorials and a telephone kiosk.

== Key ==
Grade	Criteria
I	Buildings of exceptional interest, sometimes considered to be internationally important
II*	Particularly important buildings of more than special interest
II	Buildings of national importance and special interest

== Buildings ==
Name and location	Photograph	Date	Notes	Grade
Headless Cross; 52.92527°N 1.49006°W		Early medieval (probable)	The cross, probably originally a plague cross, was moved to its present site in 1979. It is in stone, and consists of a fragment of a tapered stone shaft, on a large square base with three steps.	II
St Mary's Bridge Chapel; 52.92712°N 1.47573°W		14th century	The chapel, which has been restored, originally stood on a bridge, most of which has been replaced. At the south end is a timber framed gable under which is a Perpendicular window, and there are similar windows on the sides.	I
St Alkmund's Well; 52.92955°N 1.47820°W		Medieval	Three steps lead down to a small stone with a jet of water. In the 18th century, a low stone wall was added on the right side, and there are iron railings on three sides.	II
Stone House Prebend; 52.93364°N 1.47704°W	—	Early 16th century	The house has been altered and extended through the centuries. The older part is timber framed and encased in red brick, the rest of the house is in red brick, and the roof is tiled. There are two storeys, a U-shaped plan, and two massive external sandstone chimneys. Most of the windows are 19th-century casements.	II*
Convent of Mercy; 52.92719°N 1.47945°W		Late 16th century (probable)	An additional wing was added on the left in the early 19th century. The building is in red brick with stone dressings, floor bands, and a slate roof. The left wing has plain eaves, the right wing has a coped parapet, and the windows are replacements. On the front is a Roman Doric portico with two columns and two pilasters, and a triglyph frieze with paterae.	II
126 Nuns Street; 52.92659°N 1.48922°W		16th or early 17th century	The building is in red brick, the lower part in stone on a small plinth, and the roof is tiled. There are two storeys and a T-shaped plan. On the front is a blocked doorway with a depressed arch, and above is a blocked rectangular opening. To the sides are mullioned windows in the ground floor and modern windows above.	II
Derwent House; 52.93417°N 1.47701°W	—	16th or early 17th century	The house is in red brick on a stone plinth, with a tile roof. There are two storeys, a rectangular plan, and three bays. In each floor is arcaded banding over three round-headed recesses containing casement windows. The gable ends contain brick ornament, and a single window in each floor.	II
4 and 4A Ashbourne Road; 52.92536°N 1.49066°W		c. 1630	No. 4, formerly a public house, later a shop, it is in painted cement, with rendered brick string courses, and a tile roof with a coped gable. There are two storeys and an attic, and two bays, with a modern shop front in the ground floor and casement windows above. No. 4A to the right is an early 19th-century cottage with an earlier core, two storeys and a single bay, a shop front in the ground floor, and a casement window above.	II
Seven Stars Inn; 52.92755°N 1.48104°W		1680	The public house is in painted brick with a tile roof, two storeys and an attic. The gable end faces the street, and contains four bands of moulded brick, a doorway, various windows, and a datestone in the gable apex.	II
St Mary's Bridge House; 52.92710°N 1.47592°W		c. 1700	The house is in red brick with stone dressings, moulded brick floor bands, and a tile roof. There are three storeys and a T-shaped plan. The windows are sashes, most with channelled wedge lintels and triple keystones.	II
38 Ashbourne Road; 52.92597°N 1.49334°W		18th century	A house in red brick with stone dressings, on a stone plinth, with a slate roof. There are two storeys, the front facing the road has four bays, and it contains a small doorway in the left bay. The right return has three bays, the middle bay projecting, with a cornice, a shallow parapet, and two ball finials. This bay contains a recessed semicircular doorway with a radial fanlight, imposts and a keystone. The windows are sashes, most with segmental-arched heads.	II
28 Friar Gate; 52.92392°N 1.48478°W		Mid 18th century	A red brick house in a terrace, on a plinth, with stone dressings, a modillion eaves cornice, and a tile roof. There are three storeys and three bays. In the right bay is a round-headed doorway with a traceried fanlight, decorated spandrels, and a moulded pediment on consoles. The windows are sashes with flat brick arches.	II
29 Friar Gate; 52.92395°N 1.48486°W		Mid 18th century	A red brick house in a terrace, on a plinth, with stone dressings, a modillion eaves cornice, and a tile roof. There are three storeys and three bays. In the right bay is a round-headed doorway with pilasters, a traceried fanlight, impost blocks, and an open pediment. To its left are two shop windows, and the other windows are sashes with flat brick arches.	II
30–31 Friar Gate; 52.92399°N 1.48499°W		Mid 18th century	A shop in painted brick with a modillion eaves cornice, a parapet and a tile roof. There are three storeys and three bays. In the ground floor is a modern shop front, and the upper floors contain sash windows.	II
32 Friar Gate; 52.92404°N 1.48511°W		Mid 18th century	A red brick house on a plinth, with stone dressings, a moulded eaves cornice, and a small parapet. There are three storeys and three bays, the middle bay projecting slightly. In the centre is a round-headed doorway with engaged Tuscan columns, a traceried fanlight, and a moulded pediment. The windows are sashes, those in the ground floor with channelled wedge lintels and keystones, and the window above the doorway with a moulded surround.	II
43–44 Friar Gate; 52.92445°N 1.48637°W		Mid 18th century	A red brick house with stone dressings, floor and sill bands, a modillion eaves cornice, a small parapet, and a tile roof. There are three storeys, a symmetrical front of three bays, and a single-bay wing recessed on the right. Four steps lead up to a central doorway that has Roman Doric pilasters, a semicircular traceried fanlight with a keystone, and an open pediment The doorway is flanked by Venetian windows. In the middle floor is an arcade of three stone arches, and the windows are sashes, in the main block with moulded surrounds, the window above the doorway with a cornice.	II*
45 Friar Gate; 52.92451°N 1.48656°W		Mid 18th century	A red brick house with stone dressings, a moulded eaves cornice, and a slate roof. There are three storeys and four bays, the right bay slightly recessed, and containing a rusticated segmental coach arch. In the second bay, steps lead up to a round-arched doorway containing a recessed door with a semicircular fanlight, above which is decorative brickwork and a cornice. The windows are sashes with channelled wedge lintels and triple keystones.	II
56–57 Friar Gate; 52.92484°N 1.48773°W		Mid 18th century	A pair of red brick houses with stone dressings, on a plinth, with a moulded cornice. No. 56 has a slate roof, and No. 57 a roof of modern tiles. There are three storeys and each house has five bays. In the centre of each house is a doorway with a semicircular traceried fanlight, and a pediment on consoles. The windows are sashes with channelled wedge lintels and triple keystones.	II
58 Friar Gate; 52.92489°N 1.48797°W		18th century	A red brick house with stone dressings, on a stone plinth, with a moulded cornice and a slate roof. There are two storeys and three bays. The central doorway has a rectangular three-light fanlight and a hood, and the windows are sashes.	II
61–62 Friar Gate; 52.92506°N 1.48882°W		Mid 18th century	A pair of red brick houses with stone dressings, a modillion eaves cornice and a tile roof. There are three storeys and six bays, and the windows are sashes. Each house has a doorway in its left bay; the left doorway has a reeded surround and a hood on brackets, and the right doorway has a semicircular fanlight and a pediment on consoles.	II
St Mary's Bridge; 52.92719°N 1.47522°W		18th century	The bridge, designed by Thomas Harrison, carries a road over the River Derwent. It is in stone, and consists of three segmental arches that are divided by buttresses, each containing a small pedimented niche with a vermiculated base. At the top is a modillion cornice and a balustraded parapet.	II*
St Helen's House; 52.92740°N 1.48020°W		1766–67	A house designed by Joseph Pickford in Palladian style, later extended and used for other purposes. The front is in stone, the ground floor rusticated, the rest of the building is in red brick, and the roof is slated. The main building has three storeys and seven bays. The ground floor has a recessed round arch in each bay, the middle bay containing a doorway, and the outer bays sash windows. In the upper floors, the middle three bays are flanked by attached Roman Ionic columns, the bays contain balustraded panels, and at the top is a pediment. The windows in the central three bays of the middle floor have alternating segmental and triangular pediments, and in the outer bays they have cornices. At the top of the house is a plain frieze, a modillion cornice, and five cast iron urns. Attached to the house are the later extensions, and in front of the house is a stone wall.	I
41 Friar Gate; 52.92436°N 1.48593°W		1768	A house designed by Joseph Pickford for himself, later a museum called Pickford's House, it is in red brick with stone dressings, floor bands, a modillion cornice, an open pediment surmounted by urns, and a slate roof. There are three storeys and five bays, the middle three bays projecting slightly, and the centre bay containing a three-storey recessed round-headed arch. Five steps lead up to the central doorway that has Roman Doric engaged columns, side lights and pilasters, a traceried fanlight, a frieze decorated with architectural drawing instruments, and a modillion pediment. The windows are sashes, those in the middle three bays with moulded surrounds, and those in the middle floor with balustrades under the sills.	I
The Cedars; 52.92548°N 1.49280°W		1770–72	The house is in red brick on a plinth, with stone dressings, two storeys, five bays, and a single-bay addition on the right. In the centre is a doorway with engaged Tuscan columns, a semicircular traceried fanlight, a frieze with medallion ornament, and a moulded pediment. The windows are sashes with rusticated wedge lintels and keystones. In the addition is an arched recess containing a circular window.	II
42 Friar Gate; 52.92441°N 1.48616°W		Late 18th century	A red brick house in a terrace with stone dressings, a modillion eaves cornice and a slate roof. There are three storeys and a symmetrical front of five bays, the middle bay projecting slightly. In the centre is a doorway with a moulded surround, a traceried semicircular fanlight, and a moulded pediment on consoles. The windows are sashes with flat brick arches and keystones.	II*
59–60 Friar Gate and 2 Bridge Street; 52.92498°N 1.48819°W		Late 18th century	A building on a corner site in red brick with stone dressings, on a stone plinth, with a sill band. There are three storeys, five bays on Friar Gate and three on Bridge Street. On both fronts are round-headed recesses containing doorways with radial fanlights, on Friar Gate is a smaller round-arched doorway, and the windows are sashes.	II
60A Friar Gate and 1 Bridge Street; 52.92502°N 1.48863°W		Late 18th century	A building on a corner site in red brick with stone dressings, on a stone plinth, with modillioned eaves and a cornice and a half-hipped slate roof. There are three storeys, three bays on Friar Gate and three on Bridge Street. On Friar Gate is a doorway with a hood, on Bridge Street is a projecting canted bay. In the angle is a porch with a column on the left, rusticated quoins on the right, and a round-arched doorway.	II
63 Friar Gate; 52.92512°N 1.48899°W		Late 18th century	A house in red brick with a tile roof. There are three storeys and four bays. In front of the two right bays is a projecting modern porch. The windows in the lower two floors are sashes, and in the top floor they are casements.	II
64 Friar Gate; 52.92516°N 1.48915°W		Late 18th century	A house in red brick with stone dressings, a sill band and a tile roof. There are three storeys and four bays. The doorway has a rectangular fanlight and a hood. The left bay contains a square bay window, and the other windows are sashes with keystones.	II
Georgian House; 52.92536°N 1.48982°W		Late 18th century	A red brick house with stone dressings, and three storeys. In the centre is a tall recessed blind round arch flanked by three-light sash windows, each with a frieze and a cornice, in the lower two floors, and semicircular -arched windows in the top floor. To the left is a round-arched doorway, and to the right is a lower recessed bay containing a two-light window.	II
27 Friar Gate; 52.92389°N 1.48467°W		1778	A red brick house at the end of a terrace, on a plinth, with stone dressings, sill bands, and a modillion eaves cornice. There are three storeys and five bays. In the centre is a round-headed doorway with engaged Tuscan columns, a radial fanlight, a frieze and a modillion cornice. The windows are sashes, those in the ground floor with external shutters, the windows above the doorway with shaped surrounds, and the window in the middle floor with a pulvinated frieze and a pediment. On the right return is a large openwork gilded clock face.	II*
Wesley Chapel and minister's house 52.92641°N 1.48412°W		1802	The former chapel is in freestone, and has a gabled front and a parapet. There are two storeys and a front of three bays. The central doorway has a round-arched head and a semicircular fanlight, above it is an inscribed tablet, and the windows are sashes that have lintels with shaped soffits. At the rear is the minister's house, in red brick, with two storeys, two bays, and a hipped slate roof. The doorway has pilasters and a rectangular fanlight, and the windows are sashes.	II
Friends Meeting House; 52.92657°N 1.48143°W		1808	A porch was added to the meeting house in 1855. The building is in stone with coved eaves and a hipped slate roof. There is a single storey and a rectangular plan, with a front of five bays containing four tall round-arched windows.	II
Rykneld Mill; 52.92667°N 1.48460°W		c. 1808	A silk mill that was enlarged and later converted for residential use, it is in red brick with slate roofs. The south mill was a ribbon mill, and has eight storeys with pedimented parapets, and fronts of twelve and four bays. The north mill was a throwing mill, and has seven storeys, a hipped roof and fronts of nine and two bays. The middle mill, a weaving mill, has five storeys and twelve bays, and the other buildings include a former office wing to the north, a counting house, a manager's house and a public house. In the courtyard are the former engine house, boiler house, and the base of a hexagonal chimney stack.	II*
1–16 North Parade; 52.92901°N 1.47860°W		1818	A terrace of 16 stone houses with two storeys, and two bays each, the corner of the right-hand house angled. There is a sill band, bold lined eaves, and a slate roof, hipped at the ends of the terrace. Each house has a projecting porch with pilasters, an entablature with paterae, and brattishing in the form of acroteria above a cornice, and a rectangular fanlight. Some houses have added canted bay windows, and the other windows are sashes.	II
2 Ashbourne Road and 11–13 Brick Street; 52.92541°N 1.49050°W		Early 19th century	A row of cottages, with an earlier core, converted into shops. They are in painted cement, with plain eaves, a tile roof, two storeys and four bays. In the ground floor are 19th-century shop fronts, and the upper floor contains three casement windows and a horizontally- sliding sash window.	II
28 Ashbourne Road; 52.92574°N 1.49213°W		Early 19th century	A detached house in red brick, stuccoed on the front, with stone dressings, a moulded eaves cornice, a small parapet and a slate roof. There are two storeys and a symmetrical front of three bays. In the centre is a porch with Greek Ionic columns, and a doorway with a fanlight. This is flanked by canted bay windows, and the upper floor contains sash windows.	II
30 Ashbourne Road; 52.92578°N 1.49235°W		Early 19th century	A detached house in red brick, stuccoed on the front, with stone dressings, a wide moulded eaves cornice and a slate roof. There are two storeys and a front of three bays. In the centre is a doorway with a stuccoed reeded surround, a rectangular fanlight, and a cornice hood on brackets. The right bay contains a two-storey oval bay window, and the other windows are sashes.	II
32 Ashbourne Road; 52.92584°N 1.49262°W		Early 19th century	A stuccoed house with stone dressings, a wide moulded eaves cornice and a slate roof. There are two storeys and two bays. The right bay contains a two-storey oval bay window, and in the left bay is a doorway with a stuccoed reeded surround, a rectangular fanlight, and a sash window above.	II
4–6, 8 and 10 Bridge Street; 52.92518°N 1.48803°W		Early 19th century	A row of red brick houses with stone dressings, a sill band, and a coped parapet. There are three storeys and seven bays. On the front are three round-arched doorways with stuccoed surrounds and radial fanlights, and the windows are a mix of sashes and casements.	II
18 and 20 Bridge Street; 52.92546°N 1.48784°W		Early 19th century	A pair of red brick houses with stone dressings, on a plinth, with two storeys and six bays. The windows are sashes with wedge lintels and keystones. The left doorway has Tuscan half-columns, a three light fanlight, and a cornice, and the right doorway has stuccoed pilasters, a three-light fanlight, and a cornice hood on consoles.	II
2–8 Brook Street; 52.92589°N 1.48405°W		Early 19th century	A terrace of houses in red brick with stone dressings, a sill band and a slate roof. There are two storeys and each house has two bays. In the right bay of each house is a doorway with pilasters, a rectangular fanlight and a hood, and the windows are sashes with wedge lintels. In front of the houses are stone slab forecourt walls with railings.	II
47 Ford Street; 52.92402°N 1.48450°W		Early 19th century	The building, which probably originated in the 17th century, is in red brick with plain eaves and a tile roof. There are two storeys, two bays and a lower bay to the right. The windows in the left part are sashes, and in the right part is a casement window. The doorway, which has a rectangular fanlight, and the ground floor windows, have cambered heads.	II
35–39 Friar Gate; 52.92422°N 1.48571°W		Early 19th century	A row of four shops and a house that are rendered, painted and roughcast, on a plinth, with stone dressings, moulded eaves and a tile roof with coped gables. There are three storeys and nine bays. In the ground floor are four shop fronts, and in the left bay is a doorway with a rectangular fanlight and a cornice hood on consoles. The windows are sashes with moulded surrounds.	II
Six bollards 52.92949°N 1.47879°W		Early 19th century	The bollards at the entry to Well Street from North Parade are in cast iron. They are cylindrical and tapering, with bands, and at the top is a knob-shaped cap.	II
Chestnut House; 52.92530°N 1.48960°W		Early 19th century	A stone-faced house with corner pilasters, a moulded cornice, a small parapet and a slate roof. There are three storeys and three bays. In the centre, steps lead up to a porch with Greek Doric columns, and the windows are sashes, those in the outer bays of the two lower floors tripartite.	II
Parkfield; 52.93753°N 1.48341°W	—	Early 19th century	A red brick house on a plinth, with stone dressings, sill bands, moulded eaves, a blocking course and a tile roof. There are two storeys and three bays. In the centre is a doorway with a moulded surround, pilasters a rectangular fanlight and a cornice hood on consoles. To its left is a stuccoed canted bay window, and the other windows are sashes with wedge lintels, keystones and shutters.	II
The Georgian House Hotel; 52.92586°N 1.49275°W		Early 19th century	The hotel is roughcast, and has a moulded eaves cornice, a small parapet and a slate roof. There are two storeys and a front of five bays, the middle bay projecting slightly. In the centre is a porch with paired Doric columns, a frieze and a cornice, and a doorway with a moulded surround and side lights. The windows are sashes.	II
St John the Evangelist's Church; 52.92588°N 1.48799°W		1826–28	A Commissioners' church designed by Francis Goodwin in Early English style. It is built in stone and consists of a nave, north and south aisles, a south porch, and an apsidal chancel. At the corners are octagonal turrets with embattled parapets. Along the sides of the church are paired lancet windows, embattled parapets, and finials with embattled tops.	II*
Highfield House; 52.93392°N 1.48597°W	—	1827	The house is in stone on the east and south fronts, and in whitewashed brick elsewhere, and it has a hipped tile roof. There are two storeys, a south front of three bays, four bays on the sides, and a lower rear wing. On the front is a Doric porch, on which is a glazed canopy with a curving roof on decorative cast iron brackets. On the west, garden, front is a canted bay window, and the other windows are sashes with louvred shutters.	II
1–5 St John's Terrace; 52.92623°N 1.48800°W		Early to mid 19th century	A terrace of five stuccoed houses with bold lined eaves and a slate roof. There are two storeys and eleven bays. Each house has a recessed doorway with a rectangular fanlight, and a two-storey canted bay window with three lights, and the other windows are sashes.	II
Mansfield Road Bridge; 52.93449°N 1.46862°W	—	1836–40	The bridge was built by the North Midland Railway to carry Mansfield Road over its line. It is in sandstone with gritstone dressings, and soffits in red brick. The bridge consists of three segmental arches, the middle arch the largest. The arches have rusticated voussoirs springing from impost bands, under which are abutments with rusticated quoins and plinths. The parapets are coped, and the wing walls end in piers.	II
St Mary's Church; 52.92740°N 1.47904°W		1837–39	The church was designed by Augustus Pugin, and the Lady chapel was added in 1854 by E. W. Pugin. It is built in stone, and consists of a nave with a clerestory, aisles, a porch, a chancel with an apse, a Lady chapel, and a tower at the liturgical west end. The tower is tall and slim, with four stages, buttresses, a doorway over which is a large five-light Perpendicular window, and a niche containing a statue. At the top is a parapet with pierced stepped crenellations and corner crocketed pinnacles.	II*
47–51 Friar Gate; 52.92471°N 1.48712°W		1840	A row of stone houses with rusticated quoins, a sill band, an ornamental frieze and eaves, and a dentilled eaves cornice. There are three storeys and a symmetrical front of eleven bays, the middle three bays projecting slightly under a dentilled pediment. In the centre of the outer sections are paired porches with round-arched openings, pilasters, a frieze and a cornice. The middle section contains a doorway with a rectangular fanlight and a cornice on consoles. The windows are sashes, with cornices on consoles in the ground and middle floors, and those in the middle section with alternate segmental and triangular pediments.	II*
Eborn House; 52.93735°N 1.49258°W	—	c. 1840	The house is in engraved stucco with angle pilasters, an eaves cornice and blocking course, and a hipped slate roof. There are two storeys and five bays, and a two-bay rear wing on the left. The porch has Ionic columns, and the windows are sashes.	II
93 Friar Gate; 52.92411°N 1.48629°W		c. 1842	The house designed by H. I. Stevens is in Italianate style. It is stone-faced, the ground floor rusticated, with bold eaves and a blocking course. There are three storeys and four bays. In the second bay is a porch with pilasters and a cornice, and a round-arched entrance with a voluted keystone. Within the porch, steps lead up to a round-headed doorway with a semicircular fanlight, and in the right bay is a small round-arched doorway. The windows in the ground floor are tripartite, and in the upper floors are sash windows, those in the middle floor with arched cornices on consoles.	II
Former warping mill 52.92659°N 1.48404°W	—	Early 1840s	The mill, later used for other purposes, is in red brick on a stone plinth, with stone dressings, chamfered eaves, and a hipped slate roof. It is a narrow building with four storeys, a north front of five bays, and a single bay on the east end facing the street. The windows are casements with stone lintels, and in the ground floor is a segmental-arched cart entrance.	II
48 and 50 Kedleston Road; 52.93128°N 1.48715°W		c. 1845	A pair of stuccoed houses with pilasters, a sill band, bold lined eaves, and a hipped slate roof. There are two storeys and four bays. At each end is a semi-elliptical bay window, and between are tripartite windows. The doorways are on the sides; No. 50 has a stuccoed porch with pilasters, and No. 48 has a modern porch and a doorway with a moulded architrave and a rectangular fanlight.	II
St Paul's Church; 52.92997°N 1.47308°W		1849–50	The south aisle was added to the church in 1897. The church is built in stone with a Welsh slate roof, and has a cruciform plan, consisting of a nave, north and south aisles, a north porch, north and south transepts, a chancel and a northeast tower. The tower has three stages, stepped buttresses, and a southeast stair turret with a finial spire. On the north side is a porch with a pointed doorway, in the middle stage is a single-light window, the bell openings have two lights, and at the top is a parapet with crocketed pinnacles.	II
21–24 Duffield Road; 52.92947°N 1.48309°W	—	c. 1850	A terrace of four stuccoed houses on a painted stone plinth, with stone dressings, a sill band, wood bracketed eaves, and a slate roof with a coped gable on the right. There are two storeys, and each house has two bays. Stone steps lead up to a doorway in the right bay of each house that has a semicircular-arched head, pilasters, and a fanlight. The windows are sashes in moulded architraves.	II
Kingston Terrace, walls, railings and gate piers 52.92841°N 1.47976°W		c. 1850	A terrace of four houses in red brick with stone dressings, corner pilasters, a sill band, moulded bracketed eaves, a slate roof, and three storeys. The doorways have round-arched heads, they are in double recesses, and have imposts, a semicircular fanlight and a keystone. Most of the windows are sashes, those in the ground floor have keystones, and are set in segmental-arched recesses with imposts and a keystone, and those in the middle floor with flat heads and keystones. In front of the forecourt is a high retaining stone wall on which are elaborate cast iron railings, and at the ends are plain stone gate piers.	II
46 Friar Gate; 52.92460°N 1.48677°W		Mid 19th century	A red brick house with stone dressings, on a plinth, with floor and sill bands, a moulded eaves cornice, a parapet and a slate roof. Steps lead up to the doorway that has engaged Tuscan columns, a semicircular traceried fanlight, a frieze, and a modillion cornice. The windows are sashes, in the ground floor with moulded surrounds, in the middle floor with pilasters, cornices and pediments, and the top floor with dog-eared surrounds.	II
67–67A Friar Gate; 52.92542°N 1.48998°W		Mid 19th century	The house on a corner site is in red brick with stone dressings, plain eaves and a slate roof. There are two storeys and three bays. The central doorway has a cornice, to its right is a square bay window, and the upper floor contains sash windows with channelled wedge lintels. Extending from the left of the house is a later single storey extension with shop windows on the front and left return.	II
Accumulator Tower, St Mary's Goods Yard; 52.92805°N 1.47306°W		c. 1860	The accumulator tower, built for the Midland Railway, is in red brick on a blue brick chamfered plinth, with dressings in white and blue brick, white brick corner pilaster strips, floor bands, an eaves cornice and a slate roof. There are two storeys and a square plan, and single storey pavilions to the east. The windows have rusticated round-arched heads and complex metal glazing.	II
Town Goods Shed, St Mary's Goods Yard; 52.92890°N 1.47275°W		c. 1860	The goods shed, built for the Midland Railway, and later converted for other uses, is in red brick with stone dressings and an M-shaped slate roof with overhanging eaves. Along the sides are alternating groups of three round-headed windows and large loading entrances. At each end is a central train entrance divided into three by square cast iron columns, flanked by single round-headed windows, at the south end also flanked by projecting lower office wings with round-headed windows and doors.	II
Grain Warehouse, St Mary's Goods Yard; 52.92825°N 1.47288°W		1861–62	The former warehouse, built for the Midland Railway, is in red brick with stone dressings, dentilled eaves, and a slate roof with coped gables. There are four storeys and five bays, the middle and outer bays recessed. The other bays have pediments, the right containing a circular clock face and the left with a circular inscribed plaque. In the ground floor is a doorway and windows, all with round-arched rusticated heads. The upper floors contain windows with one, two or three lights, some with stone lintels.	II
St Anne's Church; 52.92885°N 1.48933°W		1871–72	The church is built in dark red brick with Welsh slate roofs. It consists of a nave and a chancel under a continuous roof, a clerestory, low narrow north and south aisles and chapels, a southwest porch and a southwest turret. At the west end are three lancet windows, with two similar windows above and a roundel over them. The clerestory windows are round-arched and contain roundels, and most of the other windows are lancets. The turret has a wooden bellcote, and a pyramidal roof with lucarnes and an iron finial.	II*
23 Friar Gate; 52.92372°N 1.48403°W		Late 19th century	The building, at the end of a terrace, is in red brick with stone dressings and an eaves cornice, with the gable end facing the road. There are three storeys and two bays. In the ground floor is a modern shop front, the upper floors contain two-light mullioned and transomed windows, those in the middle floor with iron guards, and in the gable apex is a quatrefoil in a square surround.	II
Friar Gate Railway Bridge; 52.92404°N 1.48545°W		1878	The bridge, now disused, was built by the Great Northern Railway to carry its line over Friar Gate. It is in cast iron, it was made by Andrew Handyside and Company, and consists of a single segmental arch with stone abutments. There is delicate ornamentation in the spandrels and in the balustrade.	II
Handyside Arch Bridge; 52.93093°N 1.47751°W		1878	The bridge, now a footbridge, was built by the Great Northern Railway to carry its line over the River Derwent. It was made by Andrew Handyside and Company, and the deck is hung from steel segmental arches with lattice construction. The abutments and parapet walls are in stone.	II
Former Friargate House School; 52.92525°N 1.48939°W		1884	The house, at one time a school, is in red brick with stone dressings, a sill band, a moulded cornice, a parapet and a slate roof. There are three storeys and eight bays, the middle four bays projecting slightly. In the centre is a stuccoed porch attached to a three-bay bay window. The porch has Greek Ionic columns, above which is a frieze and a cornice. The doorway has pilasters, a rectangular fanlight, a frieze and a cornice, and the windows are sashes with channelled wedge lintels and triple keystones.	II
Austwick; 52.93052°N 1.48332°W	—	1902	The house is in roughcast red brick, with a tile roof, two storeys and an attic, and an irregular plan. The roof has an almost pyramidal shape, and in the hips at the front is set a four-light dormer. The upper floor contains a ten-light window breaking through the eaves, and in the ground floor are bay windows set at 45 degrees. On the north front is a two-storey tower and a single-storey porch. The east front has two doorways and a five-light window above, and to the rear is a single-storey service range.	II
Wall and railing, Duffield Road; 52.93134°N 1.48378°W		c. 1905	The stone retaining wall to the elevated section of pavement along the east side of Duffield Road extends for about 380 yards (350 m), and is between 6 feet (1.8 m) and 2 feet 6 inches (0.76 m) high. It is surmounted by tapered, knob-headed cast iron standards linked by a single rail and a spiked iron chain.	II
Little Chester War Memorial; 52.92995°N 1.47260°W	—	1920	The war memorial, by the entrance to St Paul's Church, is in granite. It consists of a tapering rectangular obelisk on a base of two steps. It is surmounted by a Latin cross inscribed with the christogram "IHS". On the base is an inscription, and on the front of the obelisk are the names of those lost in the First World War. Set into the flanking walls are two tablets with inscriptions, and the names of those lost in the Second World War.	II
War Memorial, St Helen's House; 52.92741°N 1.48048°W		1921	The war memorial, designed by Reginald Blomfield, is in Portland stone, and commemorates the former pupils of Derby Grammar School who were lost in the two World Wars. It consists of an octagonal base of three moulded steps and a canted square base carrying a square pedestal, with an inscribed stone tablet on one face and bronze plaques on the others, and a moulded cornice. On the pedestal is a square obelisk on four balls, with a bronze wreath on the front, and bronze plaques on the other sides.	II
Telephone kiosk 52.92400°N 1.48577°W		1935	The K6 type telephone kiosk adjacent to Friar Gate Railway Bridge was designed by Giles Gilbert Scott. Constructed in cast iron with a square plan and a dome, it has three unperforated crowns in the top panels.	II
