= Handyside Bridge =

Bridge in Derby, England

Handyside Bridge - Derby
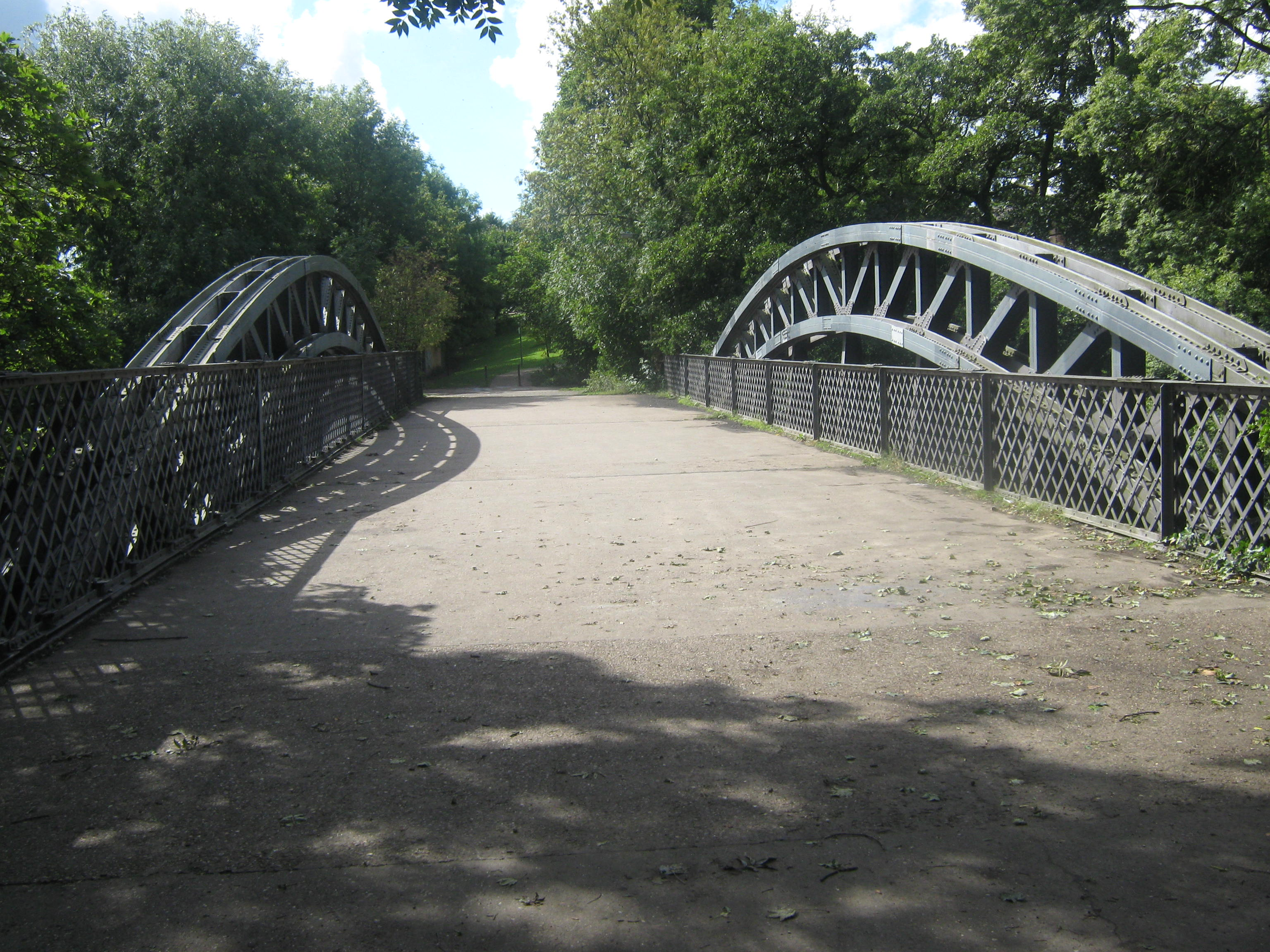
- The top of the bridge
- Coordinates: 52.9309°N 1.4775°W
- Carries: Foot (previously rail)
- Crosses: River Derwent
- Locale: Derbyshire, England
- Maintained by: Derby City Council

Characteristics
- Design: Rail Bridge
- Material: Wrought and cast iron
- Total length: 203 feet (62 m)
- Width: 33 feet (10 m)
- Height: 82 feet (25 m)
- No. of spans: River Derwent

History
- Construction start: August 1877

Statistics
- Daily traffic: 800 (2011 estimates)
- Toll: Free

Location
- Interactive map of Handyside Bridge - Derby

Handyside Bridge, also known as Derwent Bridge, is a former railway bridge in Darley Abbey, Derbyshire, England which was converted to a foot bridge in 1976 following closure of the railway in 1968.

Named for its builders, Andrew Handyside & Co., it is a tied-arch bridge constructed from riveted wrought iron and is situated at the entrance to Darley Park in Derby. It spans the River Derwent and was part of the Great Northern Railway Derbyshire Extension popularly known as the (Derby) Friargate Line. The next station to the south was Friargate which has another bridge built by Andrew Handyside.

== History ==
The bridge was built by Andrew Handyside and Company in 1878 when the Derbyshire and Staffordshire Extension of the Great Northern Railway reached Derby. Designed by Richard Johnson, the GNR's chief engineer for the extension, it consists of a single span of 140 feet (43 metres), 16 feet (4.9 m) high at the centre, supported by two bow-shaped wrought iron trusses. The design avoided the need for a supporting pier in the river, keeping the Derwent clear for navigation. During construction a test was carried out to prove the bridge would hold the weight of the expected rail traffic, in which Handyside successfully ran six locomotives with a combined weight of 432 tons across it.

The bridge carried trains from 1878 to 1968, with the last passenger train crossing on 5 September 1964 and the last goods train May 1968 by the Stephenson Locomotive Society, when the branch was closed by the Beeching cuts. The deck, which used to carry the track, is suspended from steel segmental arches of a lattice construction, with stone abutments. When the bridge was built a Cantilever pedestrian footpath was attached to its North-side to allow workers to cross. This was removed in 1978.

The Handyside-owned Britannia Foundry works were 200 metres downstream of the bridge and were served by sidings connected to the mainline via a branch line. This spur allowed products from the foundry to be transported by goods train. Another substantial business nearby was the refrigeration business of Sir Alfred Seale Haslam.

The bridge was designated a Grade II listed building on 2 March 1976 and now forms part of the Derwent Valley Mills World Heritage Site.

The next bridge downstream to cross over the River Derwent is Saint Mary's Bridge which is 448 metres away and the next bridge upstream Haslam's Lane Toll bridge which is 1,541 metres away.

== Images ==
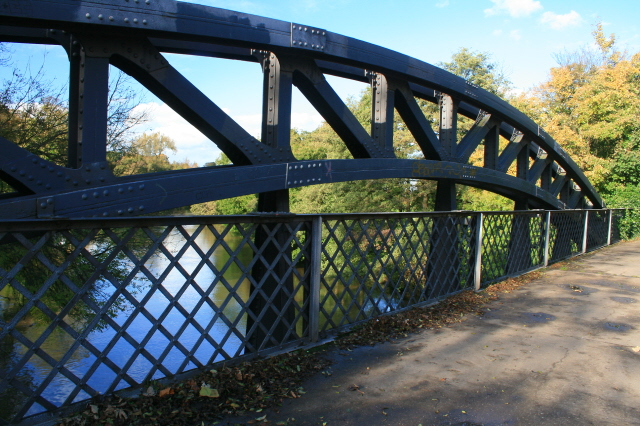

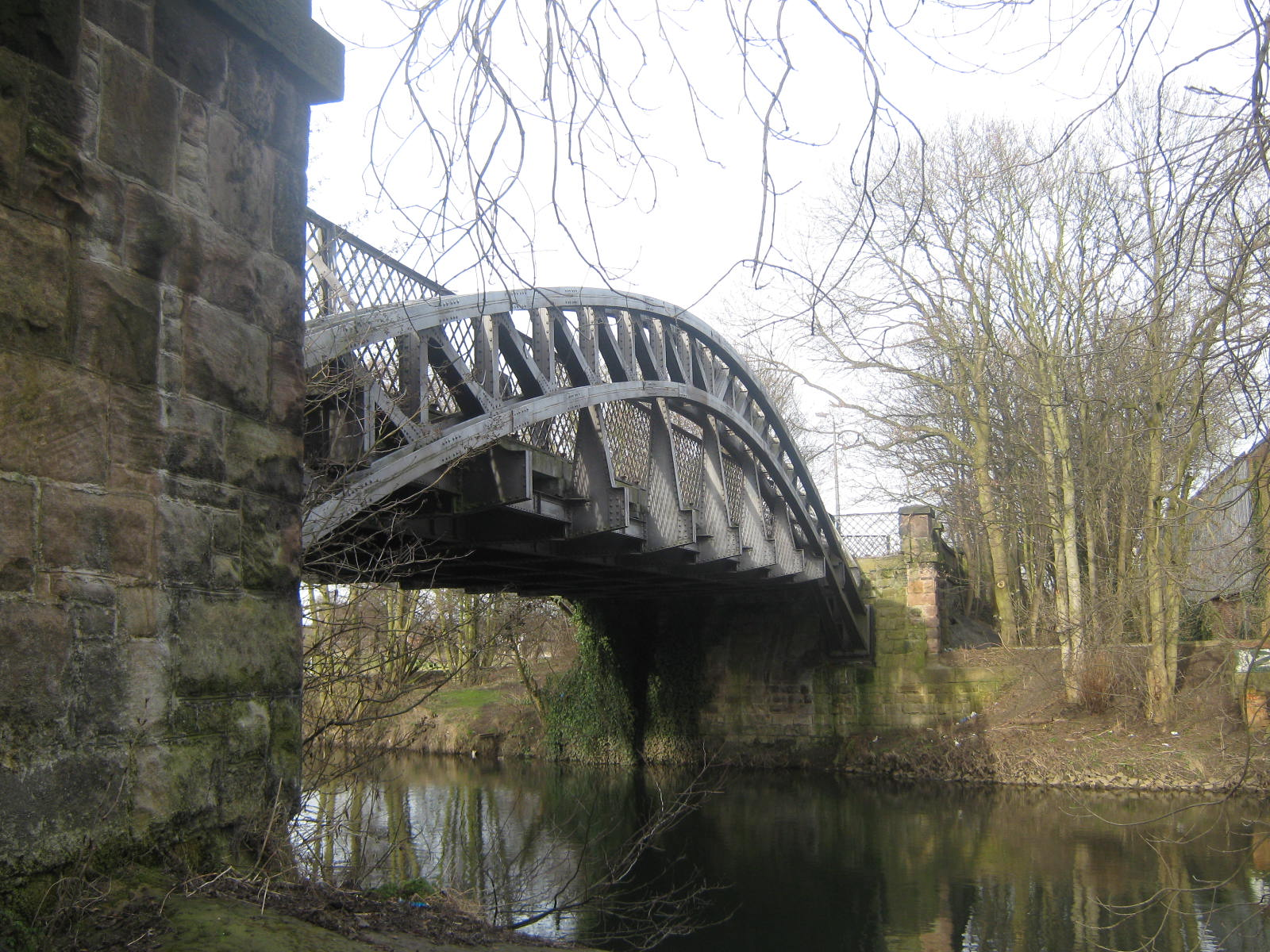

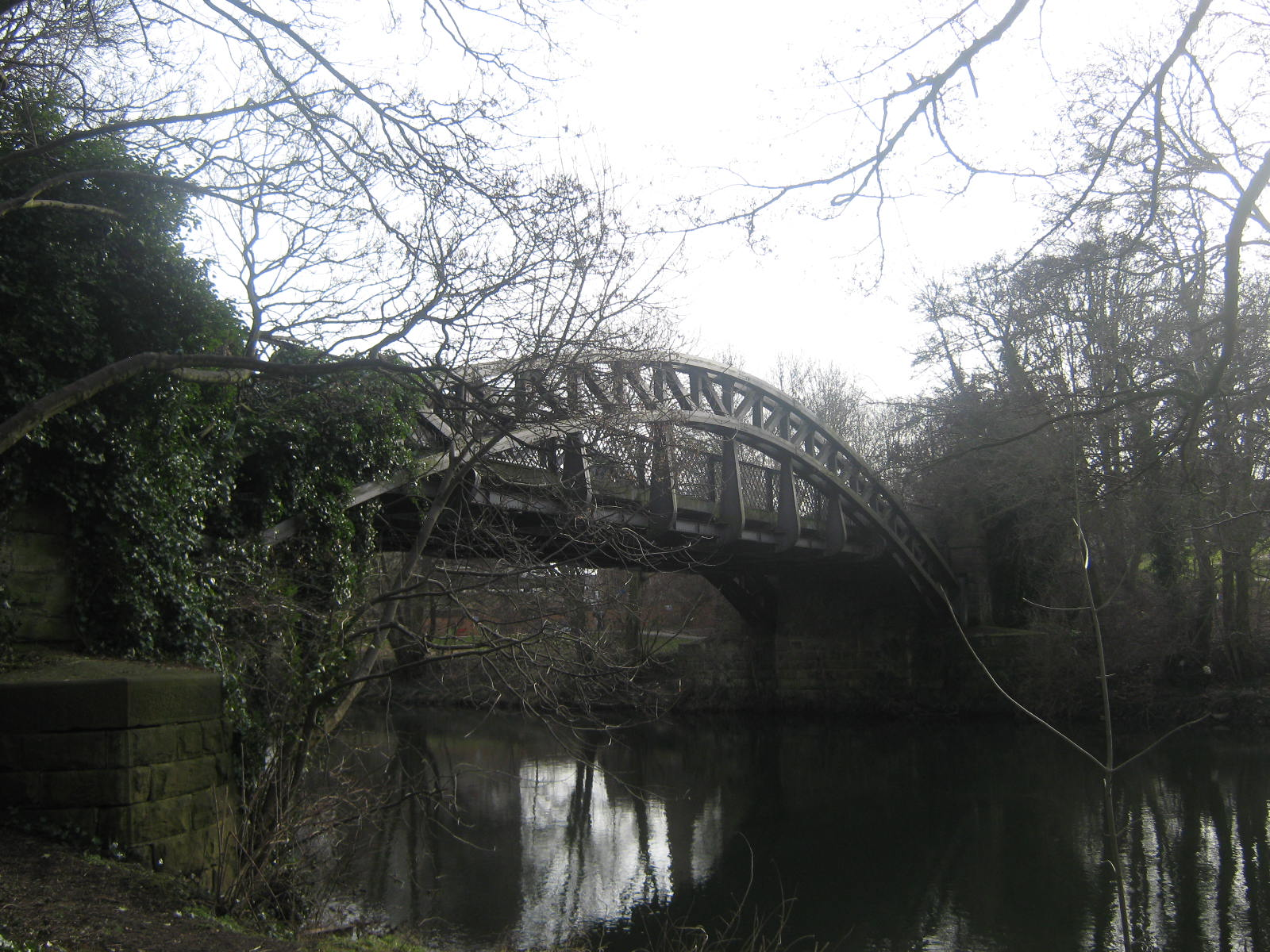

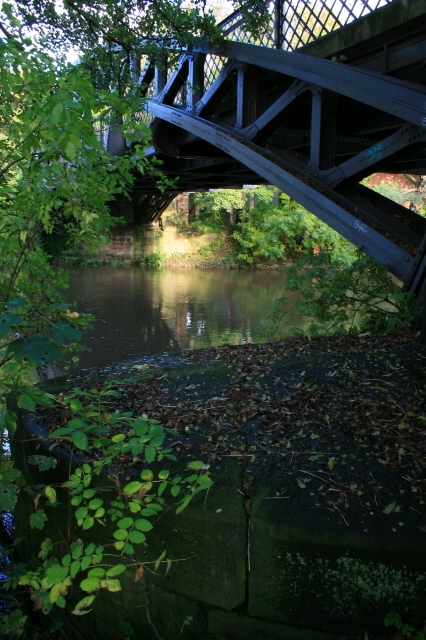

== See also ==
- Listed buildings in Derby (northern area)
- List of crossings of the River Derwent, Derbyshire
