= Friar Gate Bridge =

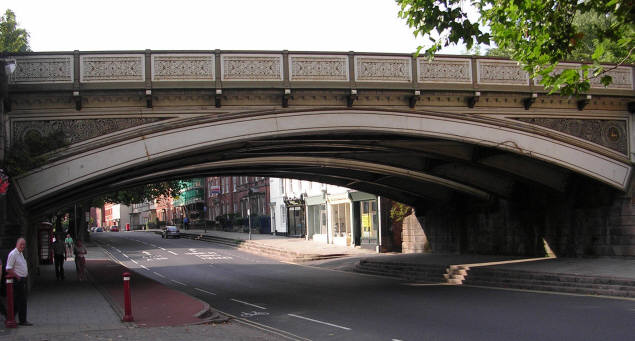
- Looking north west out of the city centre through the span of the bridge
- Coordinates: 52.923989°N 1.485604°W
- Carries: GNR Derbyshire and Staffordshire Extension
- Crosses: Friar Gate
- Locale: Derby
- Other name(s): Handyside Bridge
- Owner: Derby City Council
- Heritage status: Grade II listed

History
- Designer: Richard Johnson
- Constructed by: Andrew Handyside and Company
- Opened: 1878

Friar Gate Bridge is a railway bridge at the end of Friar Gate in the centre of Derby in the East Midlands of England. The bridge is a remnant of the GNR Derbyshire and Staffordshire Extension (known locally as the Friargate Line); it formed the approach to Derby Friargate railway station. It is a Grade II listed building.

== History and design ==
The bridge was built in 1878 by Andrew Handyside and Company, a Derby-based iron foundry firm, to the design of Richard Johnson, the Great Northern Railway's chief engineer for the route. It is of cast iron construction with stone abutments and is significant for the intricate decoration of the ironwork including the spandrels—which contain a deer motif, similar to the one on the city's coat of arms—and balustrade and the decorative two-tone paintwork. It carried the Great Northern Railway's Derbyshire and Staffordshire Extension across the foot of Friar Gate and into Derby Friargate railway station from the direction of Nottingham Victoria railway station via Bennerley Viaduct. Friar Gate is a street of Georgian houses on the edge of Derby city centre and the bridge was built to be sympathetic to the local architecture, though it did not appease local residents who complained of its "meretricious decoration, which only emphasised the insult". The bridge is, in fact, two separate bridges set slightly apart in a vee shape; the tracks on each span served opposite sides of the island platform at Friargate station. Each bridge consists of four panels of ribbed arches bolted together.

The railway line closed in 1964 as a result of the Beeching cuts. Most of the infrastructure was demolished, and the bridge and the nearby goods warehouse (built in the same year) are among the only traces of Friargate station. The Friargate Bridge forms a gap in the viaduct on which the station was sited, the arches of which remain in use by various businesses. The bridge is not accessible; the surrounding area is largely derelict and wildlife has taken over. The bridge itself fell into disrepair after its closure and British Rail eventually sold it to Derby City Council for the nominal sum of £1, on condition that the council assumed responsibility for the bridge's maintenance.

The bridge has been a Grade II listed building since 28 March 1974. It is part of a group of listed buildings with 27–32, 35–39, and 41–51 Friar Gate and 47 Ford Street. A red telephone box under the bridge is also a listed building. A campaign group was established in the 1970s to lobby for the restoration of the bridge. Derby City Council attempted several restoration projects after taking ownership of the bridge, but none came to fruition. In 2015, the council spent £260,000 on restoration work and engineering reports, in order to support an application to the Heritage Lottery Fund for £1 million for a larger restoration project including tree clearance and drainage improvements.

The bridge is the subject of the duo Flanagan and Allen's best known song Underneath the Arches, referring to the homeless men who slept there during the Great Depression. According to a television programme broadcast in 1957, Bud Flanagan said that he wrote the song in Derby in 1927, and first performed it a week later at the Pier Pavilion, Southport.

== See also ==
- Listed buildings in Derby (northern area)
- Handyside Bridge, by the same company on the same line just to the east
- List of railway bridges and viaducts in the United Kingdom
