= Richard Johnson (engineer) =

British railway engineer (1827–1924)

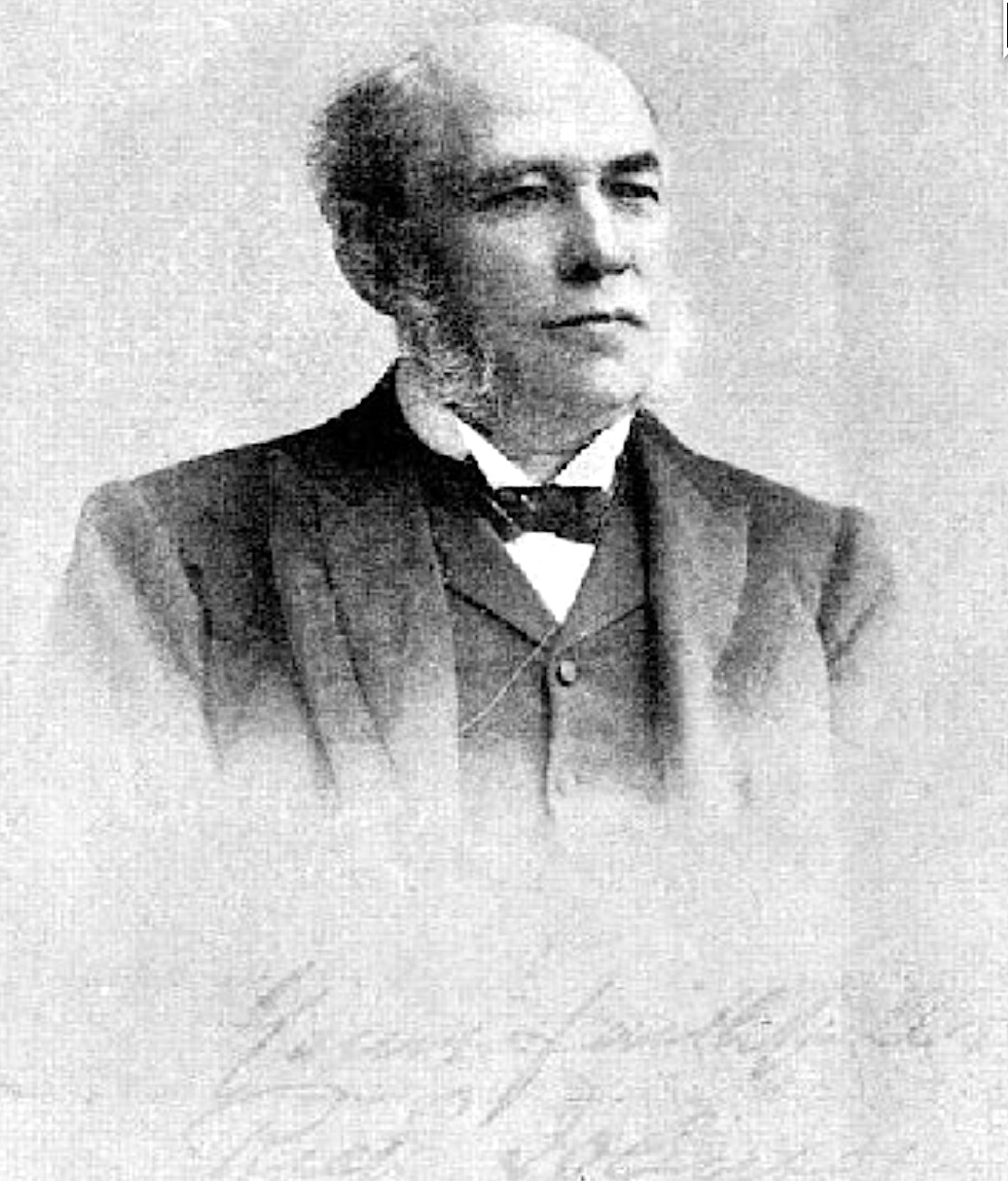
- Richard Johnson, GNR Chief Engineer
- Born: 1827; Spalding, Lincolnshire, England
- Died: 9 September 1924 (96 years old); Hitchin, Hertfordshire, England
- Occupation: Railway engineer
- Years active: 1847–1924
- Notable work: Bennerley Viaduct, Handyside Bridge, Friargate Bridge, Derby

Richard Johnson, MICE (1827 – 9 September 1924) was an English railway engineer, latterly chief engineer for the Great Northern Railway (GNR).

== Life and career ==
Johnson was born in Spalding, Lincolnshire, and began his career as an apprentice carpenter in 1840. He joined the engineering firm Brydone and Evans in 1847, working on the GNR. He was promoted in 1855 to become the district engineer for the GNR's loop line and then again in 1859 to take responsibility for the Peterborough to Doncaster route. In 1861 he became chief engineer to the GNR upon the retirement of his predecessor Walter Marr Brydone. He was in-post at the time of the Welwyn Tunnel rail crash (1866). He went on to oversee the construction of the GNR Derbyshire and Staffordshire Extension, which involved several significant bridges, including Giltbrook Viaduct in Nottinghamshire, Bennerley Viaduct near Ilkeston on the Nottinghamshire–Derbyshire border, and two in Derby: the Handyside Bridge over the River Derwent and the Friargate Bridge carrying the approach tracks to Derby Friargate railway station, as well as the Kimberley Cutting. Johnson was also involved in the construction of bridges at Newark (at 262 ft (80 m), the longest on the GNR, reconstructed in 1889–90, in place of the 1851-52 Warren Truss bridge), Doncaster (the Don Bridge), Peterborough, and the Copenhagen Tunnels just north of London King's Cross. He retired in 1896. In his 35 years as CE he converted the whole of the GNR from iron to steel rails.

In his personal life, Johnson was teetotal, avoiding all forms of alcohol, and a Christian missionary. He died on 9 September 1924 in Hitchin. His son, T R Johnson, was GNR Assistant Engineer and, from 1907 to 1914, New South Wales Chief Railway Commissioner.
