= River Erewash =

English river between Derbyshire and Nottinghamshire

Coordinates: 52°53′48″N 1°14′35″W

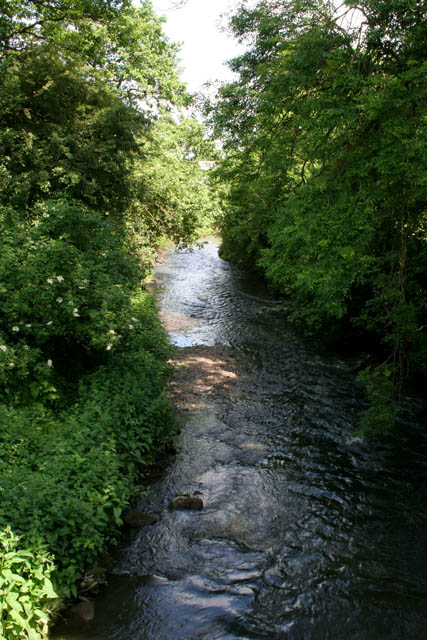
- The River Erewash, Derbyshire
- Etymology: wandering, marshy river

Location
- Country: England
- Counties: Derbyshire, Nottinghamshire

Physical characteristics
- Source
  - location: south east of Kirkby-in-Ashfield
- Mouth
  - location: confluence with River Trent at Attenborough Nature Reserve

The River Erewash /ˈɛrɪˌwɒʃ/ is a river in England, a tributary of the River Trent that flows roughly southwards through Derbyshire and Nottinghamshire, forming the boundary between the two counties for much of its length. It rises near Kirkby-in-Ashfield, and passes close to Pinxton, Ironville, Langley Mill, Eastwood, Ilkeston, Trowell, Stapleford, Sandiacre, Toton and Long Eaton to reach the River Trent near Beeston.

It shares its valley with a railway line from Kirkby-in-Ashfield to Pye Bridge Junction, and the Erewash Valley line below the junction. The Pinxton Branch of the Cromford Canal runs parallel to the upper reaches, and below Ironville the main line of the abandoned Cromford Canal enters the valley. At Langley Mill, both the Erewash Canal and the abandoned Nottingham Canal fit into the valley, with the Nottingham Canal turning to the east at Trowell, and the Erewash Canal continuing through Long Eaton when the river turns to the east to reach its mouth.

The river passes through three nature reserves, at Erewash Meadows and Aldercar Flash to the north of Langley Mill, and the Attenborough Nature Reserve on the banks of the River Trent. They are managed by the Nottinghamshire Wildlife Trust and the Derbyshire Wildlife Trust. Historically, the river has supplied power to several water mills, none of which remain standing, apart from some of Stapleford Mill, which forms part of a social club established in 1922. The river is mentioned several times in the works of the writer D. H. Lawrence.

== Etymology ==
The approximate meaning of the name is not in doubt, but there is room for debate about the precise derivation and its connotations. Brewer gives the commonly accepted explanation that it comes from the Old English words irre ("wandering") and wisce ("wet meadow"). This is accepted by Kenneth Cameron, a leading placename expert and Derbyshire specialist, who interprets the name as "wandering, marshy river". Margaret Gelling, who specialises in seeking precise topographical equivalents for toponymic elements, confirms that wisce signifies a marshy meadow but gives only southern examples. She conjectures that there is an element, wæsse, perhaps Old English, that signifies very specifically "land by a meandering river which floods and drains quickly", and her examples are primarily Midland and northern. This seems to fit the Erewash perfectly. A good example of the meandering character of the river will be seen around Gallows Inn Playing Fields, Ilkeston, where rapid flooding and draining occur frequently. As it meanders through Toton and Long Eaton the river splits into two sections; the main course veers to the east and the relief channel flows over a low weir in a straight southerly direction. When there has been prolonged rainfall, the two waters are prone to bursting their banks and meet over the football pitches and the cricket pitch.

== Course ==
The Erewash rises on the south side of Kirkby-in-Ashfield, Nottinghamshire, close to a disused railway embankment to the south of Kirkby-in-Ashfield railway station. It flows to the south-west, and is joined by another stream which rises in Portland Park and flows to the north-west, passing under the railway line for Kirkby-in-Ashfield to Pye Bridge junction, where it joins the Erewash Valley line. It is culverted beneath another disused embankment, and turns westwards to the north of Kirkby Woodhouse. To the south of Bentinck Town it is crossed by the B6018 Park Lane, and is culverted under the M1 motorway. It is joined by Maghole Brook, which is also culverted under the motorway, a little further to the north. Pinxton in Derbyshire is to the north and Selston in Nottinghamshire is to the south. The county boundary follows the course of the river from the M1 crossing to its mouth. After the motorway, it is crossed by a railway bridge. It passes the basin at the end of the abandoned Pinxton Branch of the Cromford Canal, which shares the valley as the river turns to the south. At Pye Bridge the Erewash Valley line crosses over the river, after which it too shares the valley. The railway bridge is followed by the B600 Alfreton Road bridge. As it approaches Ironville, it is crossed by two railway embankments, now part of the heritage Midland Railway – Butterley, and continues to the east of the disused Cromford Canal to reach Erewash Meadows Nature Reserve.

Erewash Meadows is a large area of floodplain grassland and wetland. It is jointly owned by Derbyshire Wildlife Trust and Nottinghamshire Wildlife Trust, and includes 0.75 miles (1.21 km) of the Cromford Canal which is in water to the north of the ponds which form the central section of the reserve, known as Brinsley Meadows. The river provides habitat for fish and invertebrates, as well as a significant number of water voles. During the spring and summer months, the ponds and the watered section of the canal are populated by grass snakes, amphibians and dragonflies. Butterflies thrive on the wild flowers which inhabit the grasslands, and during the spring, the reserve is a haven for lapwings, beeding snipe, reed buntings and sedge warblers. Wading birds, wildfowl and hen harriers can be seen during the autumn months, and some of the wildfowl stay for the winter, including widgeon and teal. The site covers around 100 acres (42 ha). To the south is Aldercar Flash nature reserve, 22 acres (9 ha) of newly created ponds and reed beds, which house populations of little ringed plover, snipe, shelduck, reed warbler and water voles.

After the reserves, the river is crossed by the A610 road to pass between Langley Mill to the west and Eastwood to the east. It is joined by Nether Green Brook, which flows westwards to reach the Erewash's left bank. It is crossed by the A608 road to the east of Langley Mill railway station, loops around the site of the Heanor Milnhay sewage treatment works at Langley Mill, and is joined by Bailey Brook on its right bank. Severn Trent submitted a planning application in 2022 to abandon the treatment works and replace it with a pumping station and pipeline to allow the effluent to be treated elsewhere. To the south-west of Eastwood the river is crossed by a Grade II listed aqueduct, built in 1779 by the engineer John Varley to carry the Erewash Canal over the river. It is constructed of sandstone, and has three segmental arches. Gill Brook joins the river on its left bank, and it is crossed by the Grade II* listed Bennerley Viaduct. It was built in the late 19th century, and is one of only two wrought iron viaducts that survive in England. It was completed in 1887, and continued in use until 1968. It is 1,421 feet (433 m) long and carried the line around 59 feet (18 m) above the river. It probably survived because of the difficulty of cutting up wrought iron at the time it was abandoned, and was extensively restored in 2022.

The river is crossed by a railway line to the north of Ilkeston railway station, by the A6096 road which runs westwards into Ilkeston, and then by the railway line again. There is a short section where the river has been straightened to accommodate the railway, before it crosses the river twice more, with the A609 road crossing between the two railway bridges. On the northern edge of Stapleford the M1 motorway crosses, and the river passes between Sandiacre to the west and Stapleford to the east. Three more bridges follow, carrying the railway, the B5010 road, and the A52 Brian Clough Way. The river threads between the Erewash Canal and Toton Sidings, and is crossed by the railway for the final time to the north east of Long Eaton. It turns to the east to flow along the southern edge of Toton, and the main channel is supplemented by a relief channel to the south. Both are crossed by the A6005 road bridge, before they join again and enter Attenborough Nature Reserve to the south of Beeston, from where the Erewash flows into the River Trent.

Attenborough Nature Reserve was first created in 1966, on land where Cemex were extracting gravel, and the Attenborough Nature Centre was opened by David Attenborough in 2005. The site is noted for kingfishers, bitterns and otters. Gravel extraction ceased in 2019, and Nottinghamshire Wildlife Trust bought the site in December 2020. Cemex had carried out extensive repairs to works bridge, which provides access to the eastern section of the site prior to the sale, but the bridge was deemed to be unsafe and beyond economic repair in 2023, with a replacement estimated to cost $0.5 million.

The river gives its name to the Erewash Valley, which has a rich industrial history, and the local government district and borough of Erewash, which was named after the river when the former borough of Ilkeston and urban district of Long Eaton were united with some of the surrounding rural areas in 1974.

== History ==
The river has been used as a source of water power in the past. Furthest upstream was Kirkby Mill or Fryers Mill, located on Mill Lane between Kirkby in Ashfield and Kirkby Woodhouse. The first known mill had a waterwheel that was 28 feet (8.5 m) in diameter. In the mid-18th century it was owned by the Fryer family, and subsequently by the Robinsons. The building was demolished in 1857 and a new mill constructed, with a wheel that was 36 feet (11 m) in diameter and carried the date 1860. Its water supply dropped by a half in 1890, when the London and North Eastern Railway built a tunnel under the Shoulder of Mutton Hill. The mill was sold to William Alfred Curtis in 1932, but only lasted for two more years, as subsidence from the nearby Bentinck Colliery resulted in the land surface dropping by 3 feet (0.9 m), and the mill became unworkable. It was demolished in 1934, although the mill pond still exists.

To the south of Langton Hall Farm stood an iron furnace. It was built in 1671 by Humphrey Jennens, and used charcoal from Kirkby Wood to heat the ore. Jennens sold 2,034 tons of unrefined cast iron in 1693. The furnace was mentioned in various leases from the 18th century, and was taken over by the Spencer Partnership. After a period of inactivity between 1750 and 1765, it was in use again, but finally closed in 1788. Traces of a mill leat and dam can still be found at the site.

Langley Mills had a mill at the time of the Domesday Book in 1086. More recently, there was a mill accessed from Cromford Road. It was owned by Smith's from the mid 1800s, and produced flour. The mill complex was demolished in 2014. Maps show that there were sluices and leats at the site, which was immediately below the confluence of the Nether Green Brook and the Erewash. A mill at Ironville was mentioned in the Nottingham Borough records for 16 June 1348, but no subsequent records are known.

Newmanleys Mill was located to the south-west of Eastwood. Some land was sold to the Day family in 1612, and the original mill is thought to have been built soon afterwards. John Day's mill is shown on a document from 1814, when it had three pairs of stones for grinding corn, an overshot waterwheel and a drying kiln. The Bentley family took over its operation around 1860, and at some point the waterwheel was replaced by an undershot wheel, which was in turn replaced by a turbine in 1892, and subsequently by a paraffin engine and then an oil engine. The mill was demolished in 1933. A new steel framed mill was built on the same site, and milling continued until 1968, with power obtained from both water and electricity.

Rather less is known about the mill at Trowell, Broxtowe. There was a mill there in the eighth year of Henry VI, around 1430, and another mention of it in 1568. It was shown on maps dating from 1774, 1836 and 1900.

The origins of Stapleford mill are unknown, but when it was sold in 1881, it had three pairs of stones and a dresser. It was converted to a steam-powered mill in 1888. After the first world war, workers used to have drinks with the manager at the mill after work finished on Fridays. The manager died in 1922, and his will left the building to his staff to be run as a social club. It opened as a club on 23 September 1922, initially for working men, but restrictions on membership have since been removed.

Water quality in the Erewash is affected by the discharge of treated and untreated effluent from sewage works. Heanor Milnhay works at Langley Mill discharged directly into the Erewash, while Newthorpe works, to the south of Eastwood, discharged into Gilt Brook, a tributary of the Erewash. Severn Trent Water carried out a major upgrade of the Newthorpe works between 2022 and 2024, and decommissioned the Milnhay works, replacing it with a pumping station to pump untreated effluent to Newthorpe once work there was completed. The work cost around £35.8 million, and was designed to improve the quality of discharges into the river system to meet the requirements of the Water Framework Directive. The treatment process included a new Enhanced Bio-Phosphorus Removal plant, which uses polyphosphate-accumulating organisms rather than chemicals to remove phosphates from the effluent, enabling phosphate levels to meet new requirements for phosphates introduced in December 2024.

1.55 miles (2.5 km) of new dual rising main was constructed between the two works. The route for the pipeline crossed land affected by legacy coal mining, and special permission had to be obtained to lay the pipes through such a high-risk area. At Newthorpe, a new inlet works was constructed to process the flow from Milnhay. The secondary and tertiary treatment sections of the plant were decommissioned, replaced by new treatment structures capable of processing twice the volume of effluent. This included anaerobic and anoxic tanks, a four-lane activated sludge plant, three final settlement tanks which are 018 feet (5.5 m) in diameter, and the largest mixed media filtration system installed in the UK. This was all built on a field next to the existing works, and the outlet from the works was re-routed directly into the Erewash.

At Milnhay, only the storm tanks were retained, although their capacity was increased from 2 megalitres to 7 Ml, by reusing the existing primary settlement tanks and building a new blind tank. The rest of the works were decommissioned, replaced by a pumping station to pump the incoming effluent to Newthorpe. The project was recognised at the 2024 Ground Engineering Awards as the best ‘UK Project with a Geotechnical Value of £500k-£1M’.

== Literary associations ==
For such a small river the Erewash has a high literary profile, due almost entirely to the writer D. H. Lawrence, who mentions it several times and centres a number of works in the Erewash valley. A reference at the beginning of The Rainbow is perhaps the most telling from the geographical point of view:

The Brangwens had lived for generations on the Marsh Farm, in the meadows where the Erewash twisted sluggishly through alder trees, separating Derbyshire from Nottinghamshire.

== Water quality ==
The Environment Agency assesses the water quality within the river systems in England. Each is given an overall ecological status, which may be one of five levels: high, good, moderate, poor and bad. There are several components that are used to determine this, including biological status, which looks at the quantity and varieties of invertebrates, angiosperms and fish. Chemical status, which compares the concentrations of various chemicals against known safe concentrations, is rated good or fail.

The water quality of the River Erewash system was as follows in 2019/2022.

Section	Ecological Status	Chemical Status	Length	Catchment
Erewash from Source to Nethergreen Brook	Poor	Fail	16.9 miles (27.2 km)	23.31 square miles (60.4 km^{2})
Erewash from Nethergreen Brook to Gilt Brook	Poor	Fail	3.9 miles (6.3 km)	2.47 square miles (6.4 km^{2})
Erewash from Gilt Brook to Trent	Moderate	Fail	10.9 miles (17.5 km)	21.61 square miles (56.0 km^{2})

Reasons for the water quality being less than good include discharge from sewage treatment works and runoff from agricultural land. The closure of Langley Mill sewage treatment works has removed the discharge of treated effluent into the river. Like most rivers in the UK, the chemical status changed from good to fail in 2019, due to the presence of polybrominated diphenyl ethers (PBDE), perfluorooctane sulphonate (PFOS) and mercury compounds, none of which had previously been included in the assessment.

== See also ==
- List of rivers in England
