= Horninglow railway station =

Former railway station in England

Horninglow

General information
- Location: Horninglow, East Staffordshire; England
- Coordinates: 52.8201°N 1.6287°W
- Grid reference: SK251247
- Platforms: 2

Other information
- Status: Disused

History
- Original company: North Staffordshire Railway
- Pre-grouping: North Staffordshire Railway
- Post-grouping: London, Midland and Scottish Railway; London Midland Region of British Railways

Key dates
- 11 September 1848: Opened
- 1 January 1949: Closed
Location

Horninglow railway station is a disused railway station in Horninglow, a district of Burton upon Trent, Staffordshire.

== History ==
The station was opened by the North Staffordshire Railway in 1848 next to the level crossing of the A38/Derby Road where it entered Burton.

The line itself dated back to 1848, and, from 1878 was shared by the Great Northern Railway (Great Britain) with its GNR Derbyshire and Staffordshire Extension.

The station buildings were more substantial than at Rolleston, being a single storey of half-timbered brick construction. A small waiting room was added on the second platform at the request of the Board of Trade in 1888. It closed to passengers on 1 January 1949. Although the station was no longer used as a stop for the 'Tutbury Jinnie' (as the local Burton-Tutbury passenger service was affectionately known), it continued to be used for occasional holiday excursion trains and the line remained in use for freight until 2 April 1966 when the last train - a short freight headed by a diesel shunter - passed through and was greeted by a half dozen trainspotters. The signal box adjacent the station, which had been active until then, closed the same day.

== Post-closure history ==
The platforms were trimmed in the 1960s and the building converted into a cafe. The outside toilet and station building/cafe remained until the 1990s, when they were demolished to make way for housing. The stationmaster's house, across the road from the station, eventually became a private dwelling and is still occupied today.

Preceding station	Disused railways	Following station
Stretton and Claymills Line and station closed	North Staffordshire Railway GNR Derbyshire and Staffordshire Extension	Burton-on-Trent Line closed- station open
