= Egginton railway station =

Former railway station in Derbyshire, England

Coordinates: 52.8628°N 1.6016°W

Egginton railway station is a former railway station in Egginton, Derbyshire.

It was opened by the North Staffordshire Railway in 1849, but closed in 1878 when the Great Northern Railway (Great Britain) opened its Derbyshire Extension and a joint station was built at Egginton Junction.

The buildings next to the Etwall Road level crossing, however, have survived and are still occupied.
