= Stretton and Claymills railway station =

Former railway station in England

Stretton & Claymills
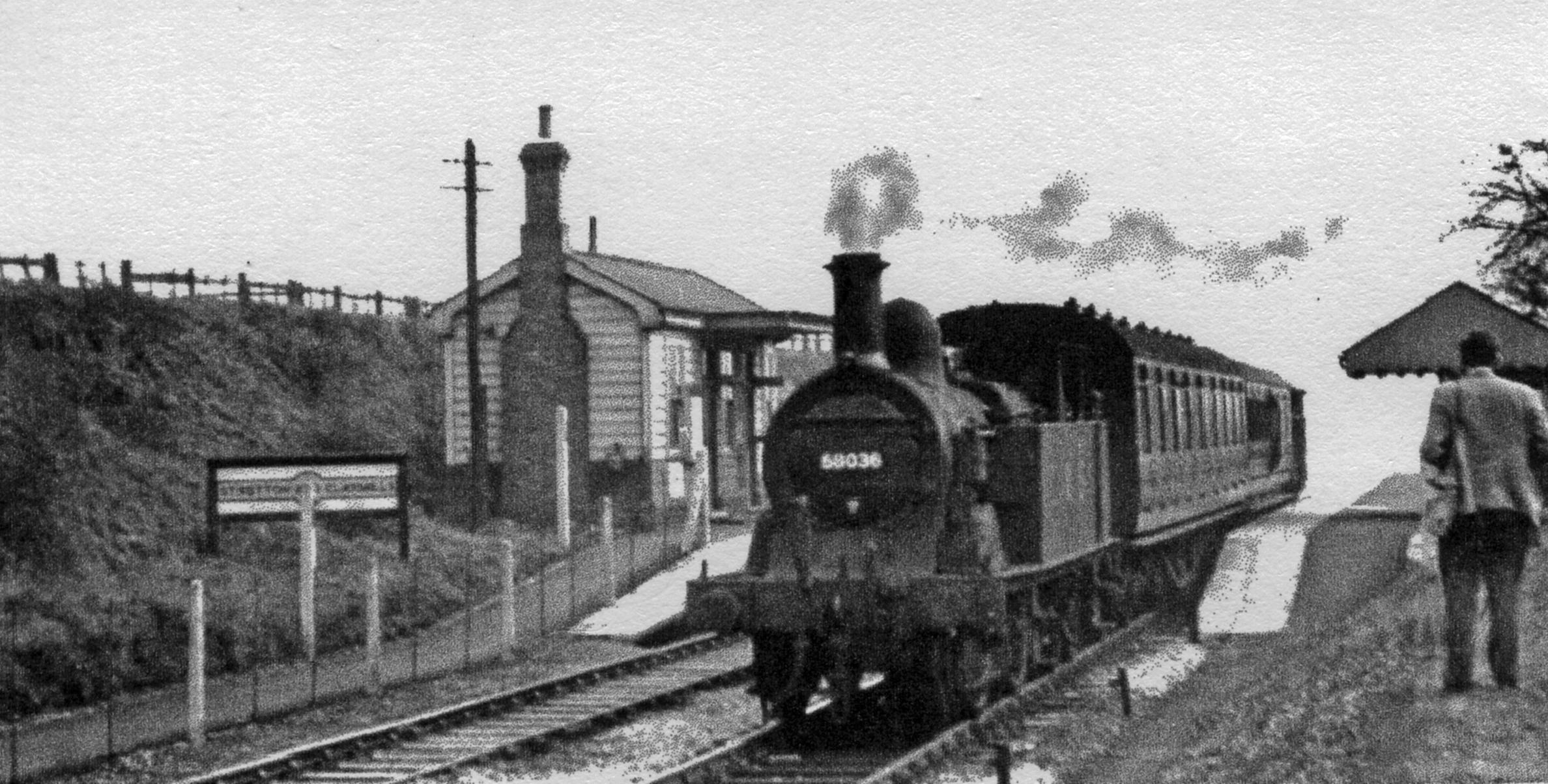
- Stretton & Clay Mills station 1949

General information
- Location: Stretton, East Staffordshire; England
- Coordinates: 52.8338°N 1.6289°W
- Grid reference: SK251263
- Platforms: 2

Other information
- Status: Disused

History
- Original company: North Staffordshire Railway
- Post-grouping: London, Midland and Scottish Railway; London Midland Region of British Railways

Key dates
- 11 September 1848: Opened
- 1 January 1949: Closed to passengers
- 7 June 1965: Goods facilities withdrawn
Location

Stretton and Claymills railway station is a disused railway station in Stretton, near Burton upon Trent, Staffordshire.

== History ==
The station was opened by the North Staffordshire Railway in 1901.

The line itself dated back to 1848, and from 1878, was shared by the Great Northern Railway with its GNR Derbyshire and Staffordshire Extension. Although the correct name is "Clay Mills", both companies referred to it as one word.

The station was built of timber throughout. There was a small booking office, and general and ladies’ waiting rooms on the main platform, with an open-fronted shelter on the other. Access was by inclined ramps from the road way outside. The LMS rebuilt the platforms in concrete, halving them to 150 foot.

The station closed in 1949 but remained intact until it was demolished in 1964. The preceding station, Horninglow, also closed in 1949 but continued to be used by occasional excursion trains, but it is not known if this was the case with Stretton. Goods traffic continued to use the line until 1966.

Preceding station	Disused railways	Following station
Rolleston-on-Dove Line and station closed	North Staffordshire Railway GNR Derbyshire and Staffordshire Extension	Horninglow Line and station closed

== Present day ==
The track has since been removed, and the way hard-surfaced to make the 'Jinnie Trail'. The station master's house has been a private dwelling since the line closed.
