= St Wilfrid's Church, Egginton =

St Wilfrid’s Church, Egginton
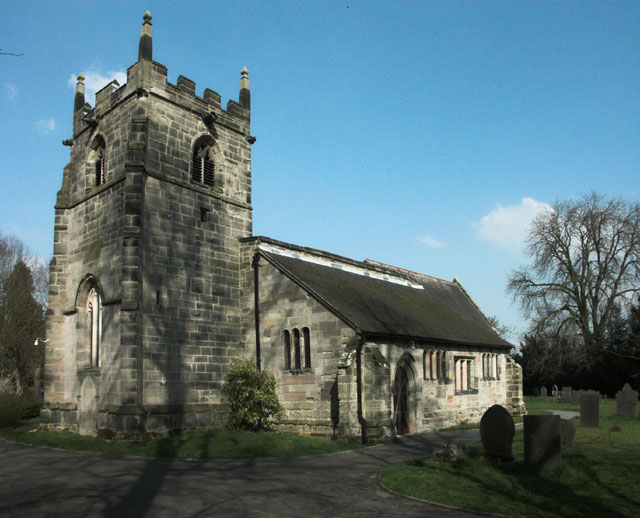
- St Wilfrid’s Church, Egginton
- St Wilfrid’s Church, Egginton
- 52°50′50.65″N 1°36′14.25″W
- Location: Egginton
- Country: England
- Denomination: Church of England

History
- Dedication: St Wilfrid

Architecture
- Heritage designation: Grade I listed

Administration
- Province: Province of Canterbury
- Diocese: Diocese of Derby
- Archdeaconry: Derby
- Deanery: Longford
- Parish: Egginton

Clergy
- Vicar: Stella Greenwood

St Wilfrid's Church, Egginton is a Grade I listed parish church in the Church of England in Egginton, Derbyshire.

== History ==
The church dates from the 12th century with elements from the 15th, 16th and 17th centuries.

The church was restored between 1891 and 1892 by Evans and Jolly of Nottingham. A new oak roof was placed over the nave and north aisle. A new concrete floor was laid, with wooden blocks under the seats and red tiles in the aisles. An organ chamber was formed between the east end of the north aisle and the vestry. The window formerly in the chancel was moved to the organ chamber and the old east window of the north aisle was moved within the church. Battlements corresponding to those of the north aisle were placed on the organ chamber. The fragments of ancient glass in the east window were releaded and replaced by Clayton and Bell. They also provided a new window in memory of Revd. Rowland Mosley. The contractors were Walker and Slater of Derby. The church was reopened by the Bishop of Southwell on 1 April 1892.

== Organ ==
The organ was by Forster and Andrews dating from 1892 and installed for a cost of £253 (equivalent to £27,793 in 2025). A specification of the organ can be found on the National Pipe Organ Register.

== Parish status ==
The church is in a joint parish with:

- St Helen's Church, Etwall

== See also ==
- Grade I listed churches in Derbyshire
- Grade I listed buildings in Derbyshire
- Listed buildings in Egginton
