= Egginton Junction railway station =

Former railway station in Derbyshire, England

Coordinates: 52.863°N 1.6167°W

Egginton Junction
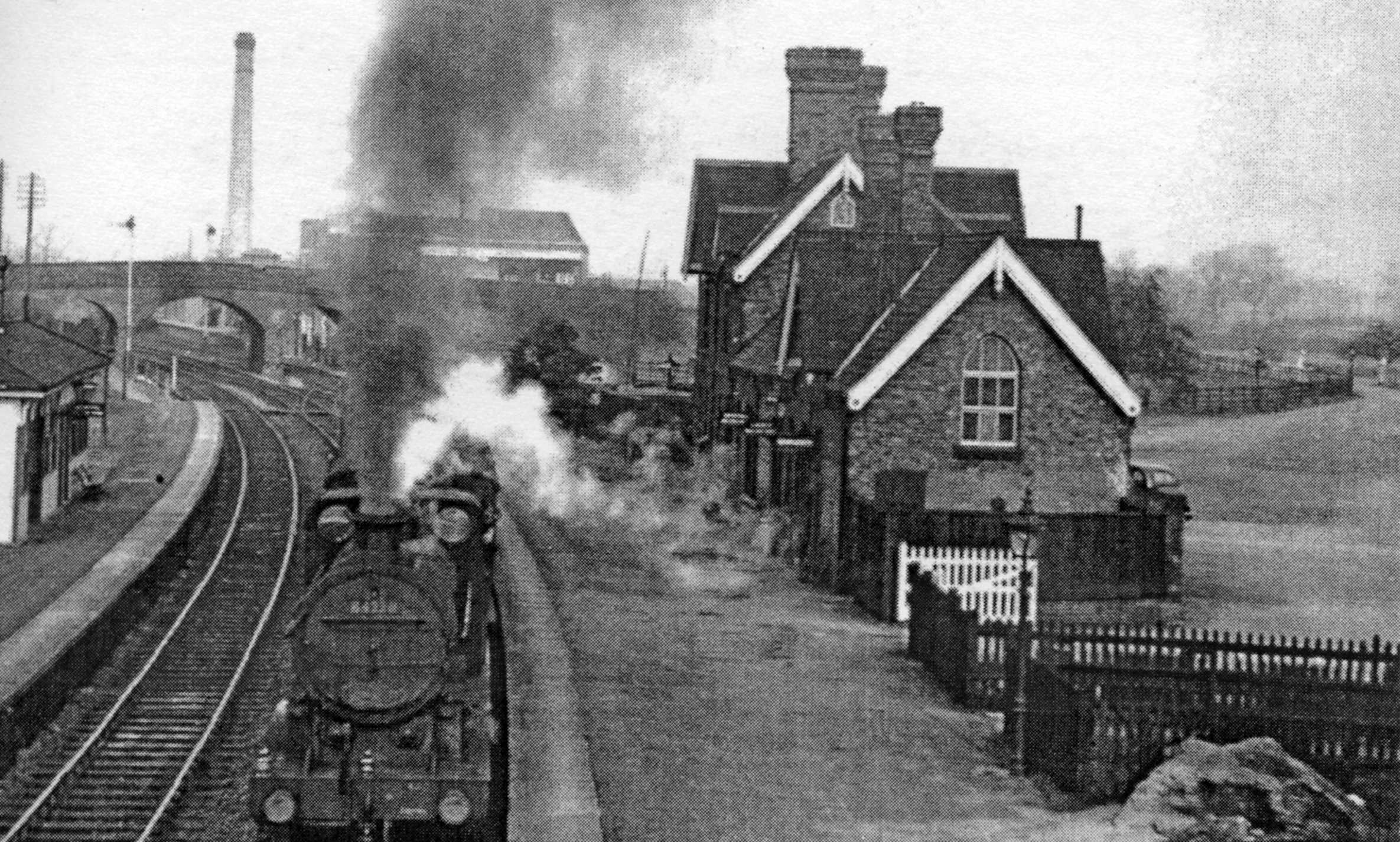
- Station in 1949.

General information
- Location: Egginton, South Derbyshire; England
- Platforms: 4 (2 GNR/2 NSR)

Other information
- Status: Disused

History
- Original company: Great Northern Railway
- Pre-grouping: Great Northern Railway; North Staffordshire Railway
- Post-grouping: London and North Eastern Railway; London Midland Region of British Railways

Key dates
- 1 July 1878: Opened
- 5 March 1962: Closed
Location

Egginton Junction railway station is a disused railway station in Egginton, Derbyshire.

== History ==
The first station serving the village of Egginton was Egginton railway station, opened by the North Staffordshire Railway (NSR) in 1849 with the opening on the line between Stoke-on-Trent and Derby at a location approximately 1/4 mile (0.4 km) west of the later station. In January 1878 the Great Northern Railway (GNR) opened on its GNR Derbyshire and Staffordshire Extension which made a junction with the NSR at Egginton. Initially there was no provision for GNR trains to stop at Egginton station so the two companies agreed to build a new station situated at the junction of the two lines. It was arranged in the angle of the junction, with platforms for the trains of both railways, and was opened on 1 July 1878.

The new station was provided with substantial brick buildings: a two-storey station master's house and the usual single storey offices on the main platform in the vee of the junction, with small timber-built waiting room on the other platforms.

Regular passenger traffic on the GNR line from Friargate finished in 1939, although it saw excursions until 1959. The station then closed in 1962. The Egginton Dairy creamery had a dedicated siding for the dispatch of milk trains around the country, until the mid-1960s.

Preceding station	Historical railways	Following station
Tutbury Line and station open	North Staffordshire Railway Crewe to Derby Line	Terminus
Terminus	Midland Railway Crewe to Derby Line	Pear Tree and Normanton Line and station open
Preceding station	Disused railways	Following station
Etwall Line and station closed	Great Northern Railway GNR Derbyshire and Staffordshire Extension	Rolleston-on-Dove Line and station closed

== Present day ==
The line from Friargate remained open for some years, being used as a test track by the British Rail Research Division. The station area was leased by a caravan dealer who later moved on. By 1974, the main station was derelict and would have been pulled down had not a building company bought it in 1978 and renovated it for use as offices. The NSR side of the station has disappeared, apart from the signal box which is still in use to supervise a level crossing and to act as the 'fringe' to Derby PSB.
