= St Mary's Church, Rolleston on Dove =

St Mary’s Church, Rolleston on Dove
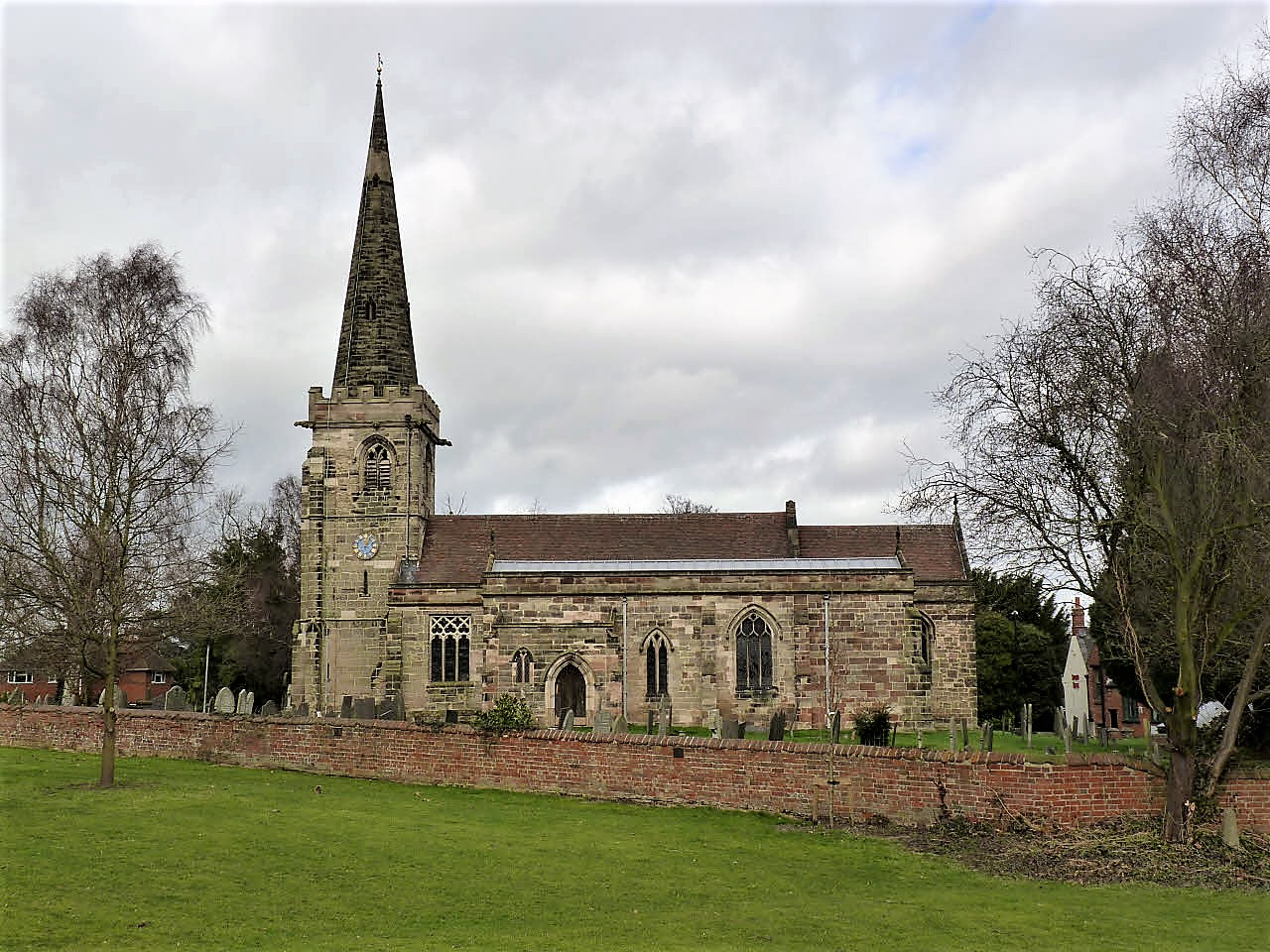
- South elevation

- Location in Staffordshire
- 52.8464°N 1.6515°W
- OS grid reference: SK 23564 27718
- Location: Rolleston on Dove, Staffordshire
- Country: England
- Denomination: Church of England

History
- Dedication: St Mary the Virgin

Architecture
- Heritage designation: Grade I listed

Administration
- Diocese: Diocese of Lichfield
- Archdeaconry: Stoke-on-Trent
- Deanery: Tutbury
- Parish: Rolleston: St Mary

St Mary's Church is a parish church of the Church of England in Rolleston on Dove, Staffordshire. Parts of the structure date to 1130, though it was extensively renovated in 1892. It is unusual in having the main entrance door on the north side, with the southern entrance reserved for members of the Mosley family, local landowners and key donors to the church. The church features stained glass windows dating to the medieval period and others by Victorian designer Charles Eamer Kempe. The tower houses eight bells, one dating to 1586. The church is grade I listed and there are associated grade II listings for churchyard railings, a memorial, the lychgate and a former church grammar school. The lychgate, by Lincolnshire architect Cecil Greenwood Hare, also functions as a war memorial.

== Organisation ==
The church is the parish church of Rolleston on Dove, Staffordshire in the Diocese of Lichfield in the Church of England. It lies within the deanery of Tutbury and the archdeaconry of Stoke-upon-Trent. By 2018 the vicar also covered Holy Trinity Church in Anslow and St Mary's Church, Tutbury. The church holds holy communion on the first and third Sunday evenings of the month and choral evensong on the other Sunday evenings. An early morning holy communion is held on the first Sunday of the month and midweek communions every Thursday morning. A morning prayer is held on the third and fourth Sundays of the month.

== History ==
A church is thought to have stood on the site since at least the early Norman period as a priest is recorded as residing at Rolleston in the 1086 Domesday Book, though the present structure is later. The advowson was owned by the lord of the manor of Rolleston. In 1261 the lord of the manor, Robert de Ferrers, 6th Earl of Derby, gave the advowson to the priory at Tutbury but it was reclaimed in 1272 by Robert's successor, Edmund, Earl of Leicester. It passed to the Crown in 1399 as part of the Duchy of Lancaster. It remained in crown control until the early 17th century. Sir Edward Mosley, 1st Baronet acquired the advowson shortly after becoming lord of the manor in the 1620s. The Mosley family had close connections to the church and several members of the family, often younger sons, served as rector. They had their own private entrance on the south of the building, and held rights over seating and the erection of monuments in the south aisle. The Mosley family remain extant and retain the right of burial in the churchyard, which otherwise closed in 1974 when the local authority constructed a cemetery to the north-west of the village.

The advowson passed to Sir C.A. King-Hardman in 1929 and was transferred to the Martyrs Memorial and Church of England Trust (MMT) in 1939. The MMT is now part of the Church Pastoral Aid Society and retain the right to present clergy for appointment to the church.

The church held a glebe of 44 acres (18 ha) of land in Rolleston and 22 acres (8.9 ha) in Anslow and received tithes from both settlements. The income was around £36 in the 13th century, but rose to around £60 in the early 17th century, and to more than £700 by 1831. The tithes for Rolleston were commuted in 1837 and for Anslow in 1844. Most of the glebe was sold in 1881. The church, first listed by Historic England on 12 March 1964 is grade I listed.

== Current structure ==
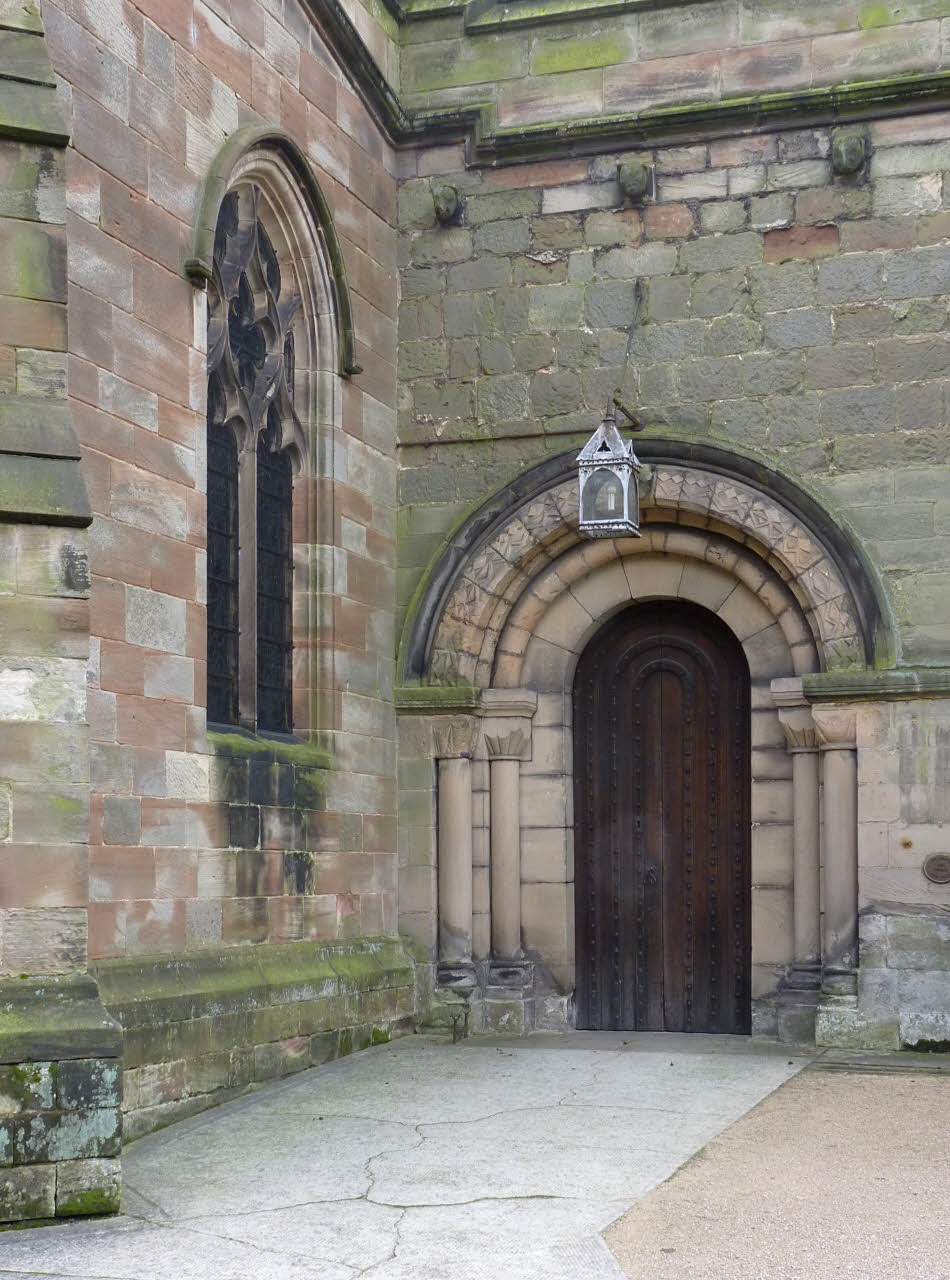
Detail of north entrance

The current church dates to the 12th and 13th centuries. It underwent a major restoration in 1892 by the architect Sir Arthur Blomfield. The oldest surviving portion is the north entrance (unusual in a church, whose entrances are usually on the south), in Romanesque style and dating to 1130. The church is constructed of ashlar sandstone and consists of a nave, chancel and tower with spire. There are aisles on the north and south sides of the church.

The nave, much of which is 13th century, is almost entirely enclosed by the aisles. There are two bays exposed on the south of the church, the one to the left of the aisle holds the 12th-century round-arched entrance doorway and the one to the right a pointed window with three lights. The single bay exposed on the north side of the church contains a window described as of unusual 17th-century construction with three treofil-topped lights and a criss-cross panel over. The nave is supported by buttresses, two stages in height. There is a three-light pointed window to the eastern end of the chancel and a cinquefoil-headed window on the north wall. The nave and chancel are roofed in red tiles.

The north aisle, also designated a lady chapel, was added in 1892. It consists of three bays, each with a two-light pointed window, with two-stage buttresses between. The easternmost bay is larger than the others and contains a priest's door. The south aisle, extended in 1892 by demolishing an external vestry, consists of four bays, again divided by two-stage buttresses. There is a pent-porched door at the south-western end, the Mosley entrance, dating to 1821. The aisles are both roofed in lead, behind stone parapets.

The tower dates to the 14th century and sits at the western end of the nave. It is of three stages buttressed on the external corners to the full height. The tower is topped by a crenelated parapet, with gargoyles, and a stone-built spire added in 1892. The bell openings are pointed and have louvres. There is a window at the western side, on the lowest stage.

=== Interior ===
The chancel features stained glass by the Victorian designer Charles Eamer Kempe and a window in the south aisle contains medieval stained glass. The chancel roof is supported by scissor trusses, the nave roof is on collar and arch braces. There are two octagonal pulpits at the western end, one of fretted oak on a stone base and one 19th-century in date of stone with quatrefoil panelled sides. The font is also octagonal. The tower is behind a wooden screen.

The interior was extensively remodelled in 1884 with new pews installed, recycling oak from the former seats; rendering and whitewash removed from the walls; the tower arch exposed and a gallery removed. The tower houses eight bells (dating to 1586, 1622, 1652, 1701, 1803, 1908, and two to 1929) and an electrically-operated clock. An organ was provided by the Mosley family during an 1892 renovation.

The church features a 1536 monument to Robert Sherborne, Bishop of Chichester. There are also monuments for Thomas Caldwell (died 1554), an unknown couple (c. 1600), William Rolleston (d.1682) and a person named Wilman (1692). There are plaques for numerous members of the Mosley family, including Sir Edward Mosley (died 1638), whose monument is the largest in the church, and Sir Oswald Mosley, 4th Baronet (died 1915).

== Churchyard ==
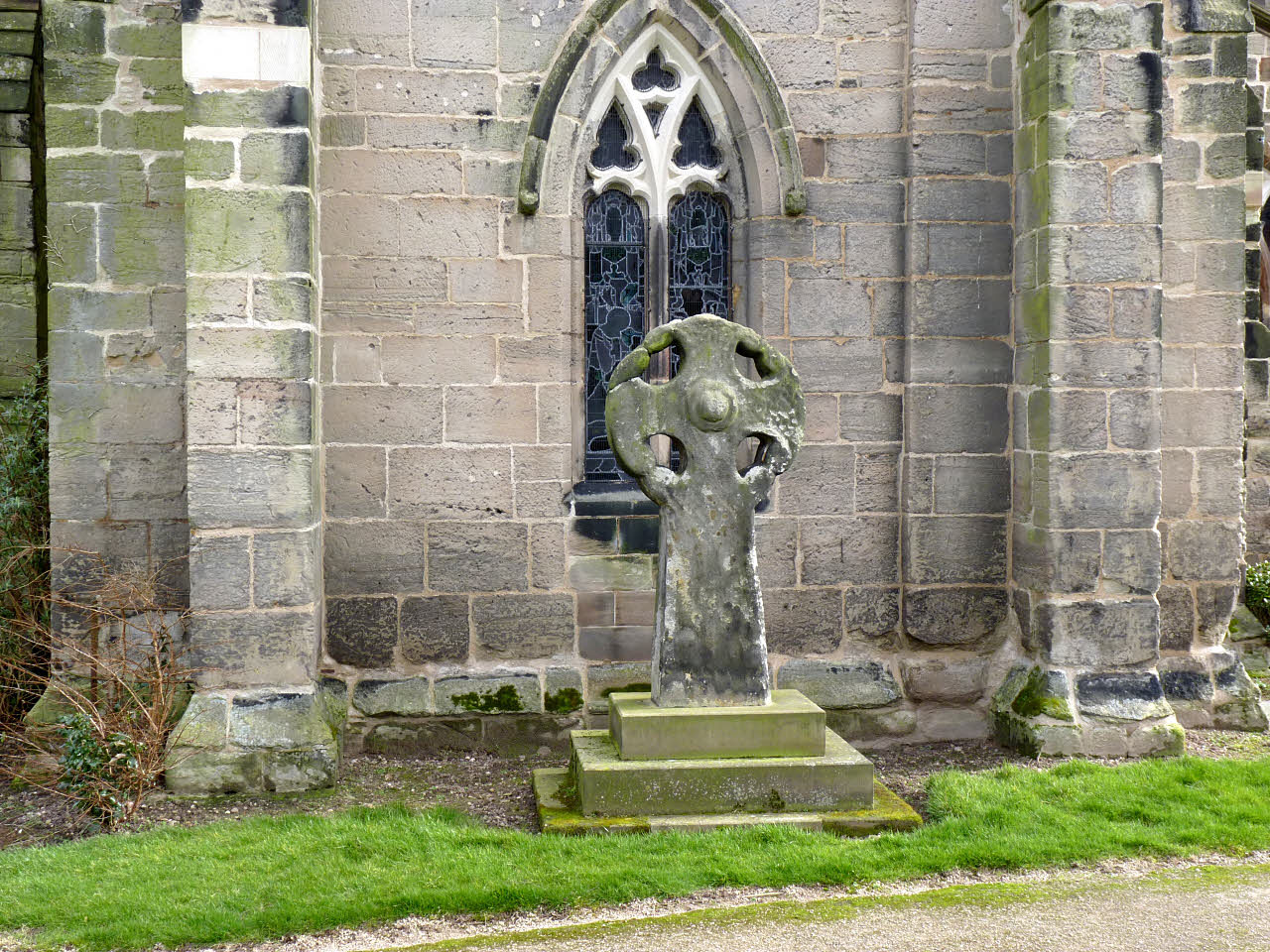
The Saxon cross

The churchyard is surrounded by a sandstone curtilage wall. It was extensively remodelled in the 19th century with entrances stopped up, walls moved and rebuilt and new entrances formed. In 1897 Sir Oswald Mosley, 4th Baronet erected a Saxon cross in the churchyard. It had previously been used as a paving slab in the porch of St Michael's Church, Tatenhill and before that was in the grounds of Rolleston Hall.

An iron fence was installed in 1900 to prevent cattle from gaining entrance, and in 1923 Sir Oswald Mosley, 5th Baronet extended the churchyard with a grant of land. Floodlighting was installed in 1996 and a millennium yew planted in 2000. The monument to George Ridgway, and some of the railings, with a gate, were separately granted grade II listed building protection on 26 March 1986.

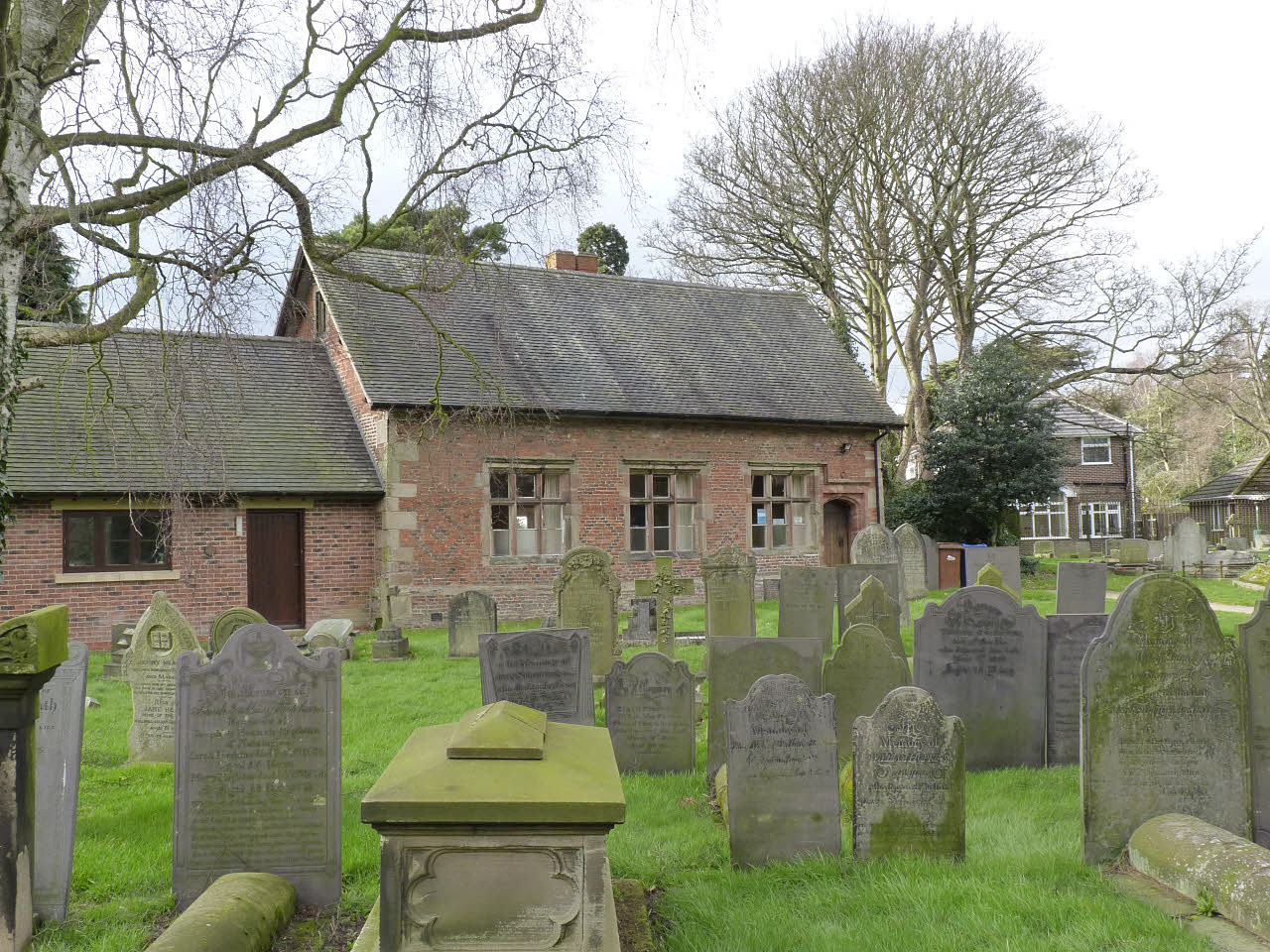
The former grammar school

The south-west of the churchyard included an access to St. Mary's Grammar School until the churchyard was remodelled in 1837, with the entrance moved to the southern side because of vandalism to the windows and gravestones. The school was first endowed by Bishop Sherbourne in 1520 and rebuilt by Sir Edward Mosley, 2nd Baronet in 1640. It closed as a school in 1909 when a council school was opened in the village, and is now used by various village organisations. The former school was granted protection as a grade II listed building on 26 March 1986. The churchyard as a whole is listed as a scheduled monument.

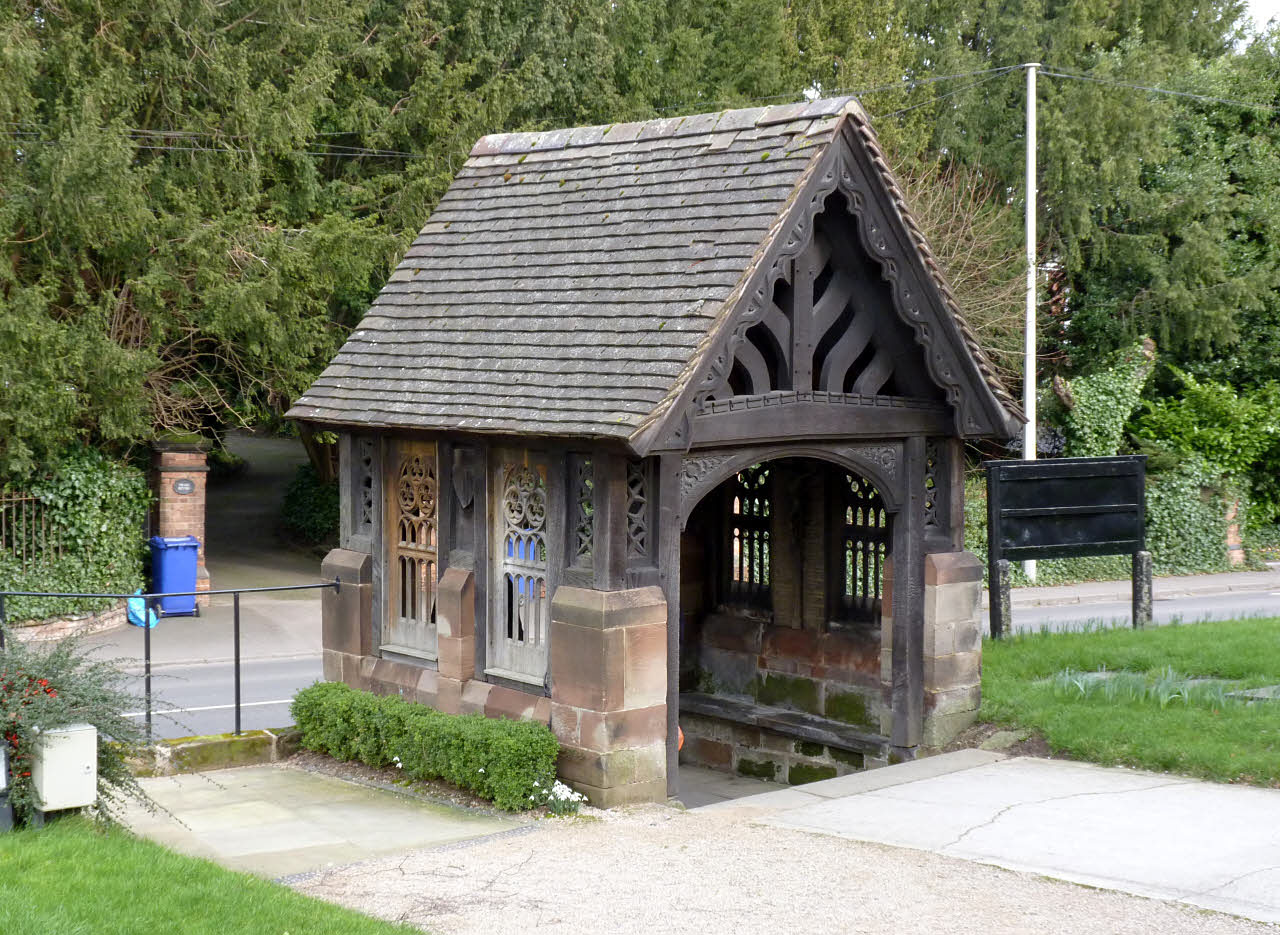
The lychgate

The lychgate at the northern entrance to the churchyard doubles as a war memorial and was erected by public subscription and a donation from the Mosley family in 1919. Designed by Lincolnshire architect Cecil Greenwood Hare and built in Lichfield, the structure contains a bronze crucifix and lists of those villagers killed during the two world wars. The pierced side panels were replaced with new versions, in oak, in the 2000s. The lychgate was granted protection as a grade II listed building on 26 March 1986.

== Rectory ==
A rectory was constructed to the north of the church in 1612. It was a substantial structure of six bays with a courtyard containing a stable block, tithe barn, dovecote and kiln. The structure was rebuilt in brick in 1700 and by this time its grounds contained extensive gardens and fish ponds. The house was improved and extended during the 19th century. It was sold and replaced by a smaller house built on church grounds in 1953.

== See also ==
- Grade I listed churches in Staffordshire
- Listed buildings in Rolleston on Dove
