= Tutbury Jinnie =

Tutbury Jinnie was the name given to a local rail service between the stations at Burton upon Trent and Tutbury. The service consisted, at various times, of up to eight trains on weekdays and two on Sundays.

== Background ==
Until 1949, the service also served stations at Horninglow, Stretton and Rolleston. Although popular, increased use of road traffic led to the loss-making service being withdrawn at the beginning of the 1960s. The last train was the 20:12 Tutbury-Burton service on 11 June 1960. The last train to use the line was a short freight hauled by a diesel shunter. The track remained in place for some years afterwards, until well into the 1970s.

== Legacy ==
The name is commemorated in the name of the Jinnie Trail, a linear park which follows the route of the old railway line.

Midland Classic bus route 1, between Tutbury and Burton, was branded "The Tutbury Jinny". Its successor is also called the Tutbury Jinnie and is run by Evolve Bus & Coach.
