= Derby Friargate railway station =

Former railway station in Derby, England

Coordinates: 52.9235°N 1.4862°W

Derby Friargate
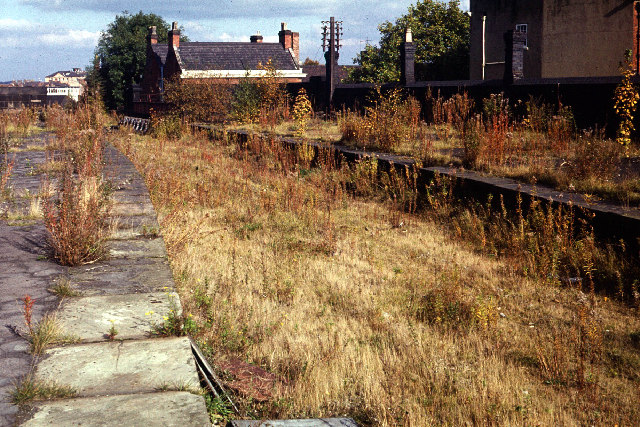
- Platform remains in 1974

General information
- Location: Derby, City of Derby; England
- Platforms: 4

Other information
- Status: Disused

History
- Original company: Great Northern Railway
- Pre-grouping: Great Northern Railway
- Post-grouping: London and North Eastern Railway; London Midland Region of British Railways

Key dates
- 1 April 1878: Opened as Derby
- December 1881: Renamed Derby Friargate
- 7 September 1964: Closed to passengers
- 4 September 1967: Goods facilities withdrawn
Location

Derby Friargate railway station was the main station in Derby on the Great Northern Railway Derbyshire Extension, popularly known as the (Derby) Friargate Line.

== History ==
The line opened on 1 April 1878. The station was on the Derbyshire and Staffordshire extension line, which ran from Burton-upon-Trent to Derby Friargate. Then line continued to Nottingham London Road. The station was closer to the city centre than its counterpart station which is on Midland Road. The station was on Friar Gate, just north of the city.

The station was closed to passengers in 1964 and to freight between Nottingham and Derby in 1967. The site was then taken over by British Rail Research Division for test tracking and researching. It used a single line between Friar Gate and the line near Egginton until 1971, when it was cut back to nearby Mickleover and the line onward was lifted.

The track from Eggington Junction to Mickleover was finally lifted between July and October 1990, to aid the construction of the A516 road's Etwall bypass. The A516 crosses the railway route slightly east of Etwall station, and opened in February 1992. Housing, including student accommodation, has since been built on the trackbed.

Preceding station	Disused railways	Following station
Derby Racecourse	London Midland Region of British Railways (Derby) Friargate Line	Mickleover

== Present day ==
=== Friargate Bridge ===
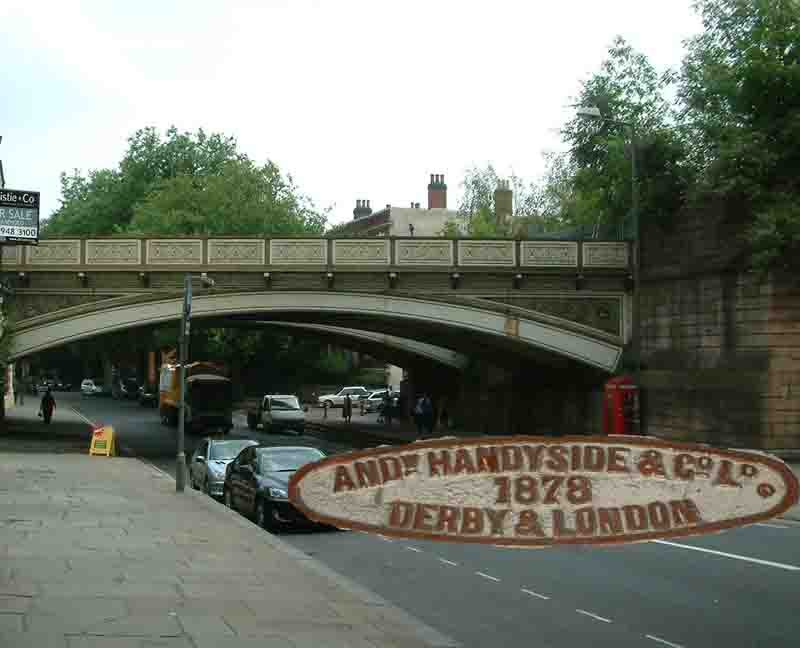
Friar Gate Bridge MS Live Map Aerial view

Today little remains of the station except Andrew Handyside & Co's bridge over Friargate, although the remaining arches attached to the south side of the bridge on the right side reveal a boarded-up arch, the inside of which contains the original staircase to the central island platforms. Now vanished is the canopy that provided passenger access to the station, which was directly adjacent to the boarded-up arch. It is now impossible to access this from below or from the boarded-up recess where the staircase ascended to the platforms.

=== Station site ===
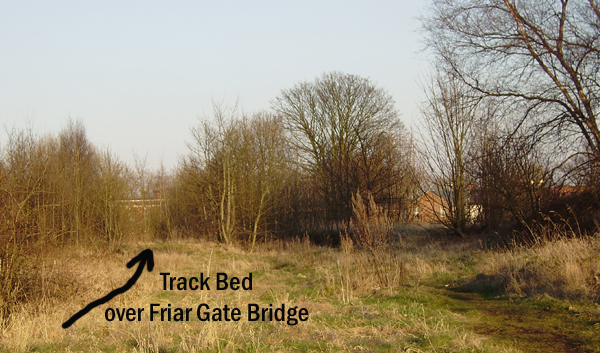
Friar Gate Station remains can be found under the trees and scrub to the right. The arrow shows the old track bed over the bridge. The houses on Friar Gate can just be seen beyond the trees.

It is possible to walk the old station site and to inspect Handyside's bridge, although the crossing has been fenced off for safety reasons. The old route of the line was towards Mickleover over a steeped bridge taking the line under Uttoxeter Old Road. The main line and sidings are now an industrial estate.

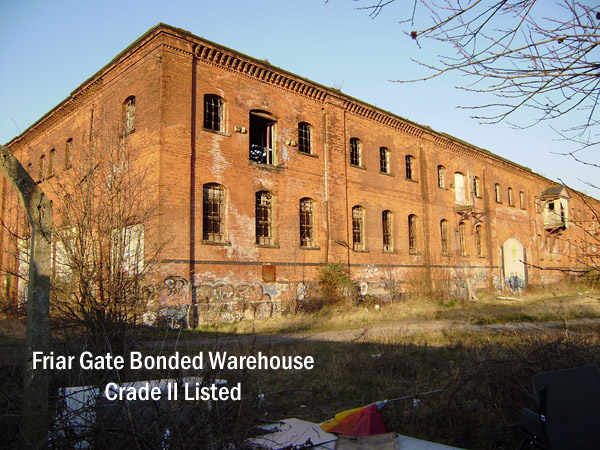
The Great Northern Railway Goods Wharf, viewed from Friar Gate, is a Grade II listed building, though derelict, plans still exist to turn this into apartments. As the building is listed it is protected from demolition.

From here the route approaches the site now occupied by Sainsbury's and there are still some signs of the existence of the old railway, such as a disused bridge over where the line once stood. Further along and a bridge carrying the old Kingsway part of Derby outer ring road can be observed, although today it only carries a little-used pavement.

Next the line crosses the line of the A38 and climbs through a deep cutting to a summit at Mickleover tunnel. Neither end of the 464-yard tunnel is visible, having been hidden beneath spoil since 1982. For further information about the route of the line and its history see Derbyshire and Staffordshire extension.

=== Friargate Bridge restoration ===
In late 2007 many members of the public and people with local businesses near Friargate railway bridge noticed the poor state of maintenance of the bridge. Several letters appeared in the local paper about this issue.

An online petition was set up to ask the council to restore the bridge. The bridge was sold by British Rail to Derby City Council for £1 in the 1960s, with the provision that the bridge would be maintained in good condition in perpetuity.

=== Memories of Friargate Station ===
Published in 1998, the book Memories of Friargate Station by local author Susan Bourne chronicles the station from its early days until its demolition. It also looks at the people who worked there.

=== Station masters ===
- Alfred Mason 1880–1882
- William Goodship 1882–1884 (afterwards station master at Leicester)
- Stephen James Sanders 1884 – 1888
- W. M. De-Ville 1889 – 1905
- F. Worman 1905 – 1922
- John Frederick Drury 1922–1932
- S. Marsden ca. 1934
- Oswald Walker
- Sidney Harold Woodward ???? – 1962

== "Underneath the Arches" ==
The Flanagan and Allen song "Underneath the Arches" may have been influenced by the arches around the bridge. According to a TV programme broadcast in 1957, Bud Flanagan said that he wrote the song in Derby in 1927, and first performed it a week later at the Pier Pavilion, Southport.
