= Mickleover railway station =

Former railway station in Derbyshire, England

Coordinates: 52.9192°N 1.5445°W

Mickleover
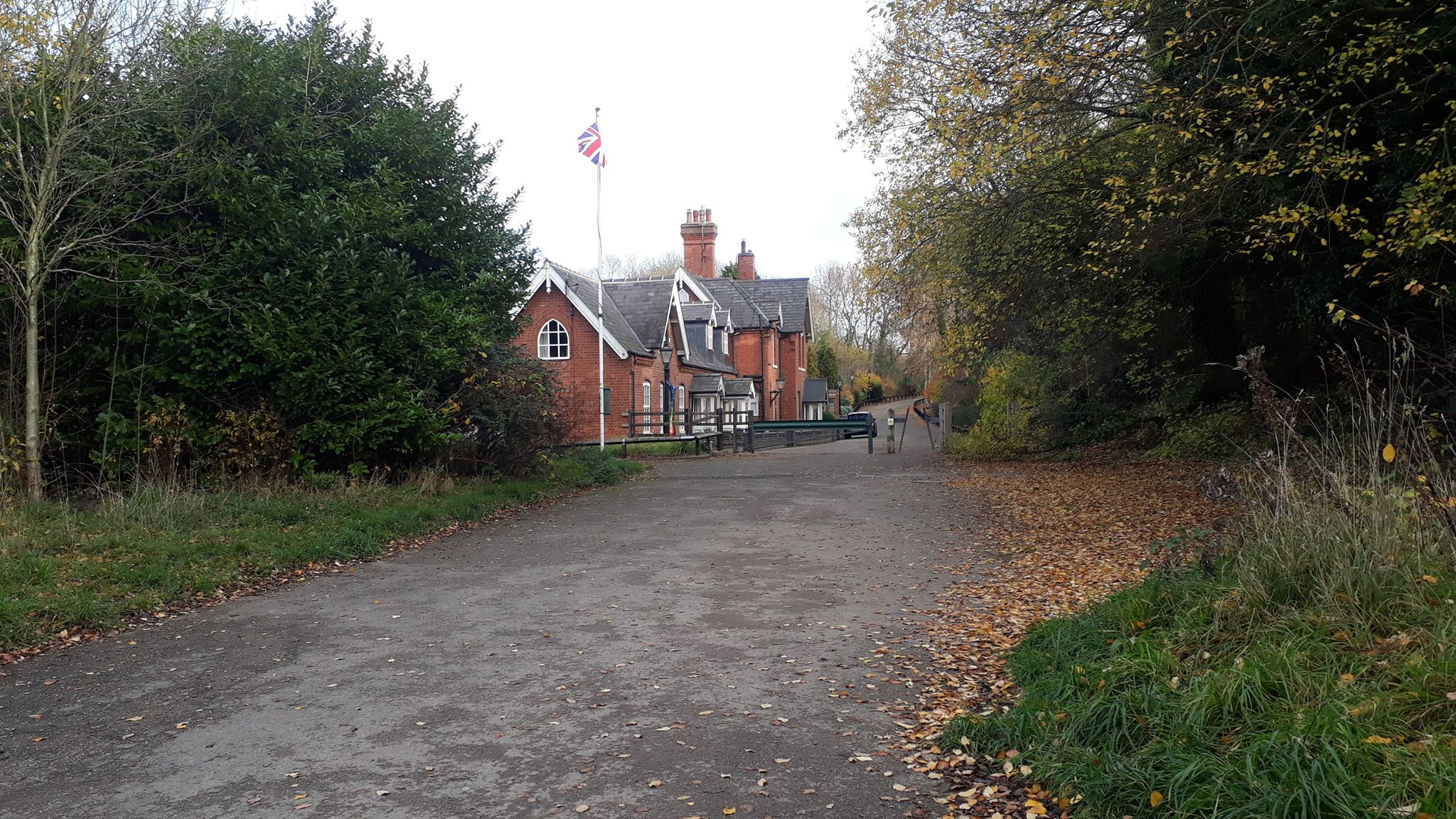
- Station building in 2019

General information
- Location: Mickleover, City of Derby; England
- Platforms: 2

Other information
- Status: Disused

History
- Original company: Great Northern Railway
- Post-grouping: London and North Eastern Railway; London Midland Region of British Railways

Key dates
- 1 April 1878: Opened
- 2 October 1939: Closed to passengers
- 3 February 1964: Goods facilities withdrawn
Location

Mickleover railway station is a disused railway station which served the town of Mickleover and village of Radbourne in Derbyshire, England. It was opened by the Great Northern Railway on its Derbyshire Extension in 1878.

== History ==
From Derby Friargate, the line climbed at 1 in 100 (10 ‰) for two miles (3.2 km) southwards. On the outskirts shortly after the present Derby ring road, the line entered a deep cutting leading to Mickleover Tunnel. The summit of the climb lay at the other end and, being curved, it presented a particular challenge to train drivers.

The station was about a mile north of the village along Station Road. It was labelled Mickleover for Radbourne, since it was in that parish, albeit some two miles distant. Originally it was spelt "Radburn" and, for a while, "Radbourn".

It was provided with substantial brick buildings; a two-storey station master's house and single storey offices on the platforms. Regular passenger traffic finished in 1939, although it saw excursions until 1959. The station was completely closed in 1964 when goods traffic ceased.

The line from Friargate remained open for some years, and was used as a test track by the British Rail Research Division.

Preceding station	Disused railways	Following station
Derby Friargate	Great Northern Railway (Derby) Friargate Line	Etwall

== Present day ==
The main station building has been converted into two private dwellings.
