= Listed buildings in Egginton =

Egginton is a civil parish in the South Derbyshire district of Derbyshire, England. The parish contains 13 listed buildings that are recorded in the National Heritage List for England. Of these, one is listed at Grade I, the highest of the three grades, one is at Grade II*, the middle grade, and the others are at Grade II, the lowest grade. The parish contains the village of Egginton and the surrounding area. The listed buildings include a church, a pinfold, houses and farmhouses, various bridges, and an aqueduct carrying the Trent and Mersey Canal over the River Dove.

== Key ==
Grade	Criteria
I	Buildings of exceptional interest, sometimes considered to be internationally important
II*	Particularly important buildings of more than special interest
II	Buildings of national importance and special interest

== Buildings ==
Name and location	Photograph	Date	Notes	Grade
St Wilfrid's Church; 52.84749°N 1.60418°W		c. 1300	The church has been altered and extended through the centuries, and it was restored in 1891–92. It is built in sandstone with roofs of lead and tile, and consists of a nave, north and south aisles, a chancel with a north vestry, and a west tower. The tower has three stages, chamfered string courses, diagonal buttresses, a west doorway with a pointed arch, above which is a three-light Perpendicular window, and a staircase in the southwest angle with an arrow slit window. The bell openings have two lights with Y-tracery, and at the top is an embattled parapet with gargoyles and pinnacles. On the south side is a 14th century doorway with a moulded arch and a hood mould, and the east window consists of five lancet windows.	I
Pinfold; 52.85223°N 1.60374°W	—	17th century (possible)	The pinfold is in sandstone, and is a rectangular enclosure contained by walls about 4 feet (1.2 m) high, with flat copings. It is open to the west, and partly open to the east.	II
Benby House Farmhouse; 52.84717°N 1.60346°W	—	18th century	A rectory, later a farmhouse, in red brick with stone dressings, a parapet to the south, and a Welsh slate roof with coped gables. There are two storeys, a south front of two bays, and a rear wing. On the south front are two canted bay windows, and on the east front is a Tuscan Doric porch with four columns and a round-arched doorway with fluted surround, and a bay window to the right. The windows are sashes with wedge lintels. In the rear wing is a dentilled cornice, and a round-arched doorway with a fanlight.	II
Manor Farmhouse; 52.85175°N 1.60781°W	—	Mid 18th century	The farmhouse is in red brick with a dentilled eaves cornice and a tile roof. There are two storeys and attics, and a symmetrical front of three bays. In the centre is a doorway with fluted pilasters and a rectangular fanlight. The windows are casements with segmental wedge brick arches, and in the roof are three dormers with hipped roofs.	II
Monk's Flood Bridge; 52.84025°N 1.60060°W		Late 18th century	The bridge carries the former Derby to Buxton road, and is in sandstone. It consists of a single small segmental arch with a plain band at the base of the parapet. The parapet walls have rounded copings, and curve out to end in octagonal piers with shallow pyramidal tops.	II
Monk's Flood North Bridge; 52.84051°N 1.59992°W	—	Late 18th century	The bridge carries the former Derby to Buxton road, and is in sandstone. It consists of a single small segmental arch with a plain band at the base of the parapet. The parapet walls have rounded copings, and curve out to end in octagonal piers with shallow pyramidal tops.	II
Coach and Horses Bridge; 52.84801°N 1.58681°W		c. 1777	This is bridge No. 25, an accommodation bridge carrying a farm track over the Trent and Mersey Canal. It is in red brick and consists of a single pointed segmental arch. The bridge has plain parapet walls ramped up in the centre with stone copings, and the flanking walls curve outward and end in square piers.	II
High Bridge; 52.84350°N 1.59674°W		c. 1777	This is bridge No. 26, carrying a track over the Trent and Mersey Canal. It is in red brick with sandstone dressings and consists of a single segmental arch with a hood mould. The bridge has plain parapet walls ramped up in the centre with stone copings, and the flanking walls curve outward and end in square piers.	II
High Bridge House; 52.84331°N 1.59672°W		c. 1777	A lengthman's house, later a private house, it is in red brick with bands, and a tile roof. There are two storeys and three bays, the middle bay with a pediment containing a circular window. In the centre is an open gabled porch, and a doorway with a fanlight. The windows are sashes with wedge lintels; those in the outer bays are tripartite.	II
Dove Aqueduct; 52.83924°N 1.60261°W		c. 1777	The aqueduct carries the Trent and Mersey Canal over the River Dove. It is in red brick with sandstone copings, and consists of 23 low segmental arches carried on piers with impost bands. At the ends, the walls curve outward and end in square piers.	II
Footbridge, Egginton Estate; 52.84667°N 1.60910°W	—	1812	The footbridge spans the remains of the weir and sluices of Egginton Hall Lake. It is in cast iron, it consists of a single elliptical arch, and has spandrels of pierced design with diminishing circles. Six of the original twelve balusters remain, and each has a square tapering shaft with twisted fluting, and is attached to the principal arch with ornate fish-tailed scrolls.	II*
Park Hill; 52.86122°N 1.60609°W	—	Early 19th century	A small country house, built as a dower house and later used for other purposes, in red brick with sandstone dressings, a floor band, a moulded cornice, a blocking course, and a hipped tile roof. There are two storeys and an L-shaped plan. The south front is symmetrical with five bays, a central Doric porch, and a round-arched doorway with a semicircular fanlight. Most of the windows are sashes with wedge brick lintels. The west front has six bays. The left part projects, and contains a canted bay window in the ground floor, and a pair of canted bay windows in the upper floor with a balustraded parapet between them.	II
Whitehouse Farmhouse; 52.85253°N 1.60243°W	—	Early 19th century	The farmhouse is in painted brick with a dentilled eaves cornice and a hipped tile roof. There are two storeys and three bays. The central doorway has a moulded surround and a rectangular fanlight, and the windows are casements under shallow pointed arches.	II
