= Andrew Webster (cricketer) =

English cricketer

Personal information
- Full name: Andrew John Webster
- Born: 5 March 1959 (age 67); Rolleston on Dove, Staffordshire, England
- Nickname: Webbo
- Batting: Left-handed
- Bowling: Right-arm medium

Domestic team information
- Years: Team
- 1981–1982: Worcestershire
- 1985–1988: Staffordshire
- 1986–1988: Minor Counties

Career statistics
Competition	FC	LA
Matches	9	17
Runs scored	81	76
Batting average	13.50	7.60
100s/50s	0/0	0/0
Top score	25	30
Balls bowled	1,249	912
Wickets	15	16
Bowling average	48.93	39.75
5 wickets in innings	1	0
10 wickets in match	0	N/A
Best bowling	5/87	4/38
Catches/stumpings	3/0	1/0
- Source: CricketArchive, 27 November 2008

Andrew John Webster (born 5 March 1959) is a former English cricketer who played first-class and List A cricket for Worcestershire during the early 1980s. He also appeared at List A level for Staffordshire and Minor Counties.

Webster played briefly for Derbyshire's Second XI in 1979, but he made his first-class debut for Worcestershire against Kent at Canterbury at the very end of the 1981 season. In a weather-affected match he bowled six wicketless overs and scored 6.

In 1982 Webster began the year in the seconds, but made his way into the first team by mid-season, and once there retained his place for most of the rest of the summer. His best performance came against Hampshire in August, when he took his career-best of 5/87 in the first innings, then (batting at ten) stayed with number 11 Stephen Perryman as the two added 6 to complete a one-wicket victory. However, he was unable to match this feat, and by the end of the year was back in the Second XI, where he never returned, due to spinal injury.

After another game for Derbyshire II, in 1985 he joined Staffordshire to play minor counties cricket, and stayed with them until the end of the 1980s, also playing six times for the Minor Counties representative side in the Benson & Hedges Cup. With Staffordshire he obtained his best List A figures, 4/38 against Nottinghamshire in the NatWest Trophy in 1985. In 1989 he was part of the Old Hill side which narrowly lost the Cockspur Cup final to Teddington.
