= Listed buildings in Rolleston on Dove =

Rolleston on Dove is a village and a civil parish in the district of East Staffordshire, Staffordshire, England. It contains 28 listed buildings that are recorded in the National Heritage List for England. Of these, one is listed at Grade I, the highest of the three grades, and the others are at Grade II, the lowest grade. Most of the listed buildings are houses, cottages, farmhouses, farm buildings and associated structures. The other listed buildings include a church, items in the churchyard, a former school, almshouses and associated structures, and public houses.

== Key ==
Grade	Criteria
I	Buildings of exceptional interest, sometimes considered to be internationally important
II	Buildings of national importance and special interest

== Buildings ==
Name and location	Photograph	Date	Notes	Grade
St Mary's Church; 52.84649°N 1.65163°W		12th century	The church was altered and extended during the following centuries, and was restored in 1892 by Arthur Blomfield who also added the north chapel. The church is built in sandstone with lead roofs on the aisles, and tiled elsewhere. It consists of a nave, a south porch, north and south aisles, a chancel, and a west steeple. The steeple has a tower with three stages, angle buttresses, an embattled parapet with gargoyles, and a recessed spire. The church has retained some Norman features, including the doorways and a north window in the chancel.	I
School and attached house 52.84637°N 1.65235°W		1638 or 1640	The building was altered and extended in the 19th century. It is in red brick on a plinth, with stone dressings and quoins. There is a single storey, three bays, and a rear wing. The windows in the main range are moulded, mullioned, and transomed, and in the rear wing they are segmental-headed casements. On the front is a Tudor arched doorway, and some of the quoins have inscribed panels.	II
1 Beacon Road; 52.84555°N 1.64543°W		17th century	The house, which was altered in the 19th century, is timber framed on a brick plinth, with infill and some replacements in painted brick, and with a thatched roof. There is one storey and an attic, and three bays. Above the doorway is a lean-to hood, to its left is a small bay window, the other windows are casements, and there are three swept half-dormers.	II
14 and 16 Burnside; 52.84500°N 1.65149°W		17th century	The house was altered in the 19th century and has been divided into two. It is timber framed on a stone plinth, with rendered infill, some replacement in brick, and a tile roof. There is one storey and an attic, and an L-shaped plan, with a front range of three bays, the left bay gabled, and a gabled cross-wing on the right. The windows are casements, and there is a round-headed doorway on the right side of the cross-wing.	II
1 Chapel Lane; 52.84567°N 1.64594°W		17th century	The house was later altered. It is timber framed with infill and additions in rendered brick, and it has a tile roof. There is a single storey and an attic, and three bays, with a lower bay to the right. To the left is a garage door, to the right is a doorway, the windows are casements, and there is a central gabled half-dormer.	II
Ivy Cottage; 52.84658°N 1.64792°W		17th century	The cottage, which was altered in the 20th century, is timber framed with infill and rebuilding in brick, and it has a tile roof. There are two storeys, two bays, and a lower wing to the right. In the centre is a gabled porch, and the main part contains oriel windows, with hipped roofs in the ground floor, and under the eaves in the upper floor.	II
3 Beacon Road; 52.84550°N 1.64554°W		1707	A red brick house with a dentilled band, dentilled eaves, and a tile roof. There are two storeys, two bays, and a lean-to on the right. On the front the date and initials are spelt out in raised bricks. There is a central doorway, and the windows are casements.	II
5 and 6 Bladons Yard; 52.84595°N 1.64990°W		1707	A house that was altered in the 20th century and divided into two, it is in red brick with a band and a hipped tile roof. There are two storeys and an attic, and five bays. On the front the date is laid out in blue brick, and there are two lean-to porches. The windows are casements, and there are two small hipped dormers.	II
The Almshouses; 52.84538°N 1.65140°W		1712	The almshouses, which were restored in 1892, are in red brick with stone dressings quoins and a tile roof. There is one storey and attics, and a front of eight bays. In the centre is an open pediment containing a cartouche with a coat of arms and an inscription. The doorways are in three pairs, the windows are small-pane casements with raised keystones, and there are six hipped dormers.	II
Ferndale Cottages; 52.84771°N 1.65266°W		Early 18th century	A row of timber framed cottages with painted and rendered infill and a tile roof. There are two storeys, three bays, three gablets on the front, and a lean-to on the left. The windows are cast iron casements.	II
Wall, The Almshouses; 52.84531°N 1.65106°W		Early 18th century	The wall encloses the garden to the east of the almshouses. It is in red brick with glazed terracotta, and has pitched capping. The wall is about 1.5 metres (4 ft 11 in) high and is ramped up towards the centre of the east side where it joins two gate piers with ball finials.	II
The Croft House; 52.84689°N 1.64922°W		Early 18th century	A red brick house with a band at eaves level, a parapet, and a tile roof. There are two storeys and an attic, two bays, and a rear wing. In the centre is a gabled porch, and a doorway with a radial fanlight in a Neoclassical recess. The windows are casements.	II
Brookhouse Inn; 52.84737°N 1.64690°W		Early to mid 18th century	A farmhouse, later a public house, it is in red brick with bands, a parapet, and a tile roof. There are three storeys, a double-depth plan, three bays, and a lower gabled wing and a coach house to the right. In the centre is a stone Tuscan porch with a frieze and a cornice. The windows are small-pane casements with segmental heads, and in the wing is a flat-roofed dormer.	II
7 and 8 Brookside; 52.84719°N 1.64906°W		18th century	A house, later divided into two, in red brick, with a band, and a tile roof. There are two storeys and attics, and two bays. The doorways are in the centre, to the left is a square bay window, and to the right is a sash window; all the openings have relieving segmental arches. In the upper floor the window on the left is a casement with a scrolled swan-neck arch, and to the right is a sash window with a segmental arch, and there are two gabled dormers.	II
Barn Farmhouse; 52.84649°N 1.64810°W		Late 18th century	A farmhouse, later a private house, it is in red brick, painted on the front, with a band, a dentilled eaves course, and a tile roof, hipped to the right. There are two storeys and three bays. The doorway has a moulded surround, a frieze and a hood, and the windows are casements with segmental heads.	II
Linden Lea and Wesley Cottage; 52.84649°N 1.64783°W		Late 18th century	A house, later divided into two, in red brick, with a band, dentilled eaves, and a tile roof. There are two storeys and an L-shaped plan, with a front of four bays, lower flanking one-bay wings, and a rear wing. The doorways are in the centre, and the windows are small-paned casements.	II
Churchyard railings and gate 52.84642°N 1.65258°W		Late 18th or early 19th century	The railings, which are in cast and wrought iron run along the west side of the churchyard of St Mary's Church for about 30 metres (98 ft). They are about 2 metres (6 ft 7 in) high, and are ramped up to a gateway at the north end.	II
Pump, The Almshouses; 52.84537°N 1.65119°W		Late 18th or early 19th century	The hand pump is in the garden in front of the almshouses. It is about 1.5 metres (4 ft 11 in) high, in cast iron, and encased in a timber box, which is wider at the top. Protruding from the box are the handle and the spout.	II
Ridgway Memorial; 52.84654°N 1.65191°W		c. 1824	The memorial is in the churchyard of St Mary's Church, and is to the memory of George Ridgway. It is a chest tomb in stone, and has a raised and ridged top slab, bowed reeded pilasters at the angles with paterae to the capitals, and an inscribed side panel in slate.	II
9 Church Road and railings 52.84709°N 1.65483°W		Early 19th century	Originally a lodge, later a private house, it is in rendered brick, and has a band and a hipped slate roof. There are two storeys and two bays. The central entrance has a Tuscan doorway and a moulded cornice, and above it is a plaque depicting figures in relief. The windows are sashes or replacement casements, and have raised keystones. To the east is a small enclosure with cast iron railings.	II
Gate piers, 9 Church Road; 52.84703°N 1.65467°W		Early 19th century	The four gate piers are in cast iron and have a square plan. They are about 2 metres (6 ft 7 in) high, and have panelled sides, and cornices surmounted by small urns.	II
Brookside Farmhouse; 52.84714°N 1.64957°W		Early 19th century	The farmhouse is in red brick with dentilled eaves and a tile roof. There are two storeys and attic, and three bays. The central doorway has a moulded surround, a fanlight, and a cornice. The windows are sashes with segmental heads, and there are three gabled dormers with stone lintels.	II
Outbuildings, Brookside Farm; 52.84744°N 1.64913°W	—	Early 19th century	These consist of a barn, stables and other outbuildings. They are in red brick with tile roofs, they form a t-shaped plan, and have one or two storeys. The openings include various doorways, four Diocletian windows, and other windows.	II
Dean Cottage; 52.84714°N 1.64962°W		Early 19th century	The cottage is in rendered brick on a plinth, with a band and a tile roof. There are two storeys, and two bays. The windows are small-pane casements.	II
Dower House; 52.84687°N 1.65078°W		Early 19th century	The house is in painted brick with a band and a hipped tile roof. There are two storeys and an attic, three bays, and a wing to the right. The central doorway has a fanlight and a lean-to hood, and it is flanked by three-sided bay windows. The other windows are sashes and there is a lunette in a central gablet.	II
Craythorne Hall and Manor; 52.84042°N 1.63490°W		Mid 19th century	A large house, later divided into two, it is in sandstone with quoins, corniced eaves, and a hipped slate roof. There are two storeys and an irregular plan, with an entrance front of two bays, a projecting single-bay to the left, and a taller narrower projecting wing to the right. In the centre is a cast iron porch with paired Tuscan columns, a frieze and a balustrade. Most of the windows are sashes.	II
The Spread Eagle Public House; 52.84649°N 1.65084°W		Mid 19th century	The public house, which possibly has a 17th-century core, is in painted brick, it has a tile roof, and an L-shaped plan. The range facing the street is about 30 metres (98 ft) long. The part to the left, which is older, has one storey and an attic, two gables, two doorways with gabled hoods, and casement windows. The later extension to the right has two storeys, two gables, two oriel windows in the upper floor, and casements with segmental heads in the ground floor. The rear wing on the left has one storey and an attic, and contains three gabled dormers. All the gables have decorative bargeboards and most have finials.	II
Lychgate and War Memorial; 52.84664°N 1.65155°W		c. 1920	The lych gate is at the north entrance to the churchyard of St Mary's Church. The base is in sandstone, the superstructure is in timber, and the roof is tiled. The bargeboards of the gables are cusped, and on the sides are fretted panels. The lych gate is also a war memorial and there are painted memorial inscriptions on the inside members.	II
