= Jinnie Trail =

Coordinates: 52.8395°N 1.6286°W

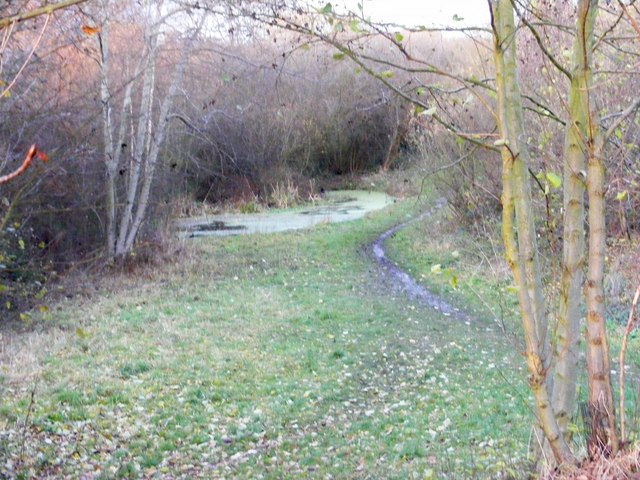
The Jinnie Trail

The Jinnie Nature Trail is a conservation area stretching along a narrow man-made valley between the villages of Rolleston on Dove and Stretton. It was originally built as a railway line stretching from Tutbury and into Burton on Trent. However, today it remains as a rural walk kept as a nature conservation area stretching approximately 2 kilometres in length.
