= Etwall railway station =

Former railway station in Derbyshire, England

Coordinates: 52.8817°N 1.6081°W

Etwall
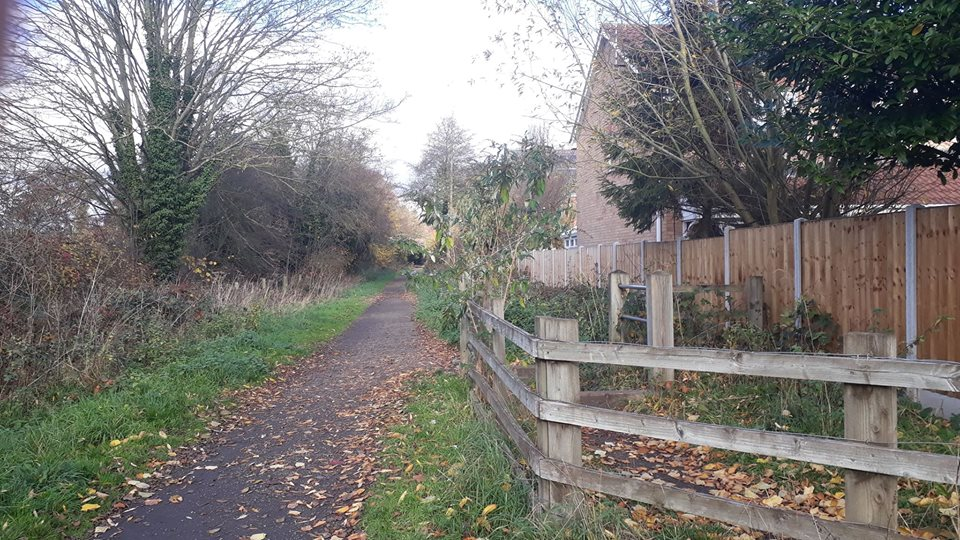
- Site of the station 2019

General information
- Location: Etwall, South Derbyshire; England
- Platforms: 2

Other information
- Status: Disused

History
- Original company: Great Northern Railway
- Pre-grouping: Great Northern Railway
- Post-grouping: London and North Eastern Railway; London Midland Region of British Railways

Key dates
- 1 April 1878: Opened
- 4 October 1939: Closed to passengers
- 4 March 1968: Goods facilities withdrawn
Location

Etwall railway station is a disused railway station in Etwall, Derbyshire. It was opened by the Great Northern Railway on its Derbyshire Extension in 1878.

== History ==
From Mickleover the line dropped at about 1 in 110 (9.1 ‰) towards Etwall.

The station was very close to the village, being adjacent to the Uttoxeter road which crossed the line by a steeply sloped bridge. It was provided with substantial brick buildings similar to others on the line; a two-storey station master's house and the usual single storey offices on one platform, with a small timber waiting room on the other. After public services finished, the stationmaster continued to live in the house.

Regular passenger traffic finished in 1939, although the station saw excursions until 1961. Goods traffic continued until 1968, after which the line from Derby Friargate was used as a test track by the British Rail Research Division for some years.

Preceding station	Disused railways	Following station
Mickleover	Great Northern Railway (Derby) Friargate Line	Egginton Junction

== Present day ==
The goods yard was sold to an agricultural engineering company who later bought the house and demolished it 1987–8. In the early 2000s, a small housing development was constructed on the site; the road leading into the site being called 'Old Station Close'. The footpath constructed on the old trackbed can be reached from this estate.
