= Stretton, East Staffordshire =

Village in Staffordshire, England

Coordinates: 52.834°N 1.626°W

Stretton
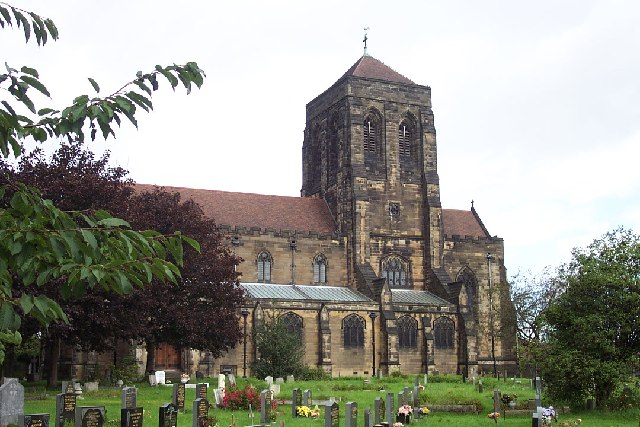

- Location within Staffordshire
- Population: 8,611 (2011)
- OS grid reference: SK252263
- District: East Staffordshire
- Shire county: Staffordshire
- Region: West Midlands
- Country: England
- Sovereign state: United Kingdom
- Post town: BURTON-ON-TRENT
- Postcode district: DE13
- Dialling code: 01283
- Police: Staffordshire
- Fire: Staffordshire
- Ambulance: West Midlands
- UK Parliament: Burton

Stretton is a large village and civil parish in Staffordshire, England. It is situated on the northern outskirts of Burton upon Trent and is now a suburb. The name is Old English and means Street Town derived from its location on the Roman road called Ryknild Street. The population of the parish at the 2001 census was 8,355, increasing to 8,611 at the 2011 Census.

The River Dove which forms the border between Staffordshire and Derbyshire flows past the eastern side of the village. The Trent and Mersey Canal also passes through.

Stretton was served by a railway station (Stretton and Claymills railway station) which was opened by the North Staffordshire Railway on 1 January 1901. There was also a Stretton Junction. The station and the North Staffordshire Railway line have now gone. Today the principal transport link is the A38 road which passes through.

Stretton is home to the sports and social clubs of Stretton Eagles and Stretton Wanderers. It also shares a nature trail with the neighbouring village of Rolleston on Dove.

Schools include Fountains High School, Fountains Primary School and William Shrewsbury Primary School.

The parish church of Stretton is St Mary's, part of the Diocese of Lichfield. The Dovecliff Hall Hotel is a Grade II listed country house to the north of the village.

== Notable people ==
- Irven Edwards (1907 in Stretton – 1973) an Anglican priest, a prebendary of Lichfield Cathedral and Dean of Wells 1963-1973

== See also ==
- Listed buildings in Stretton, East Staffordshire
