= Rolleston-on-Dove railway station =

Disused railway station

Rolleston-on-Dove
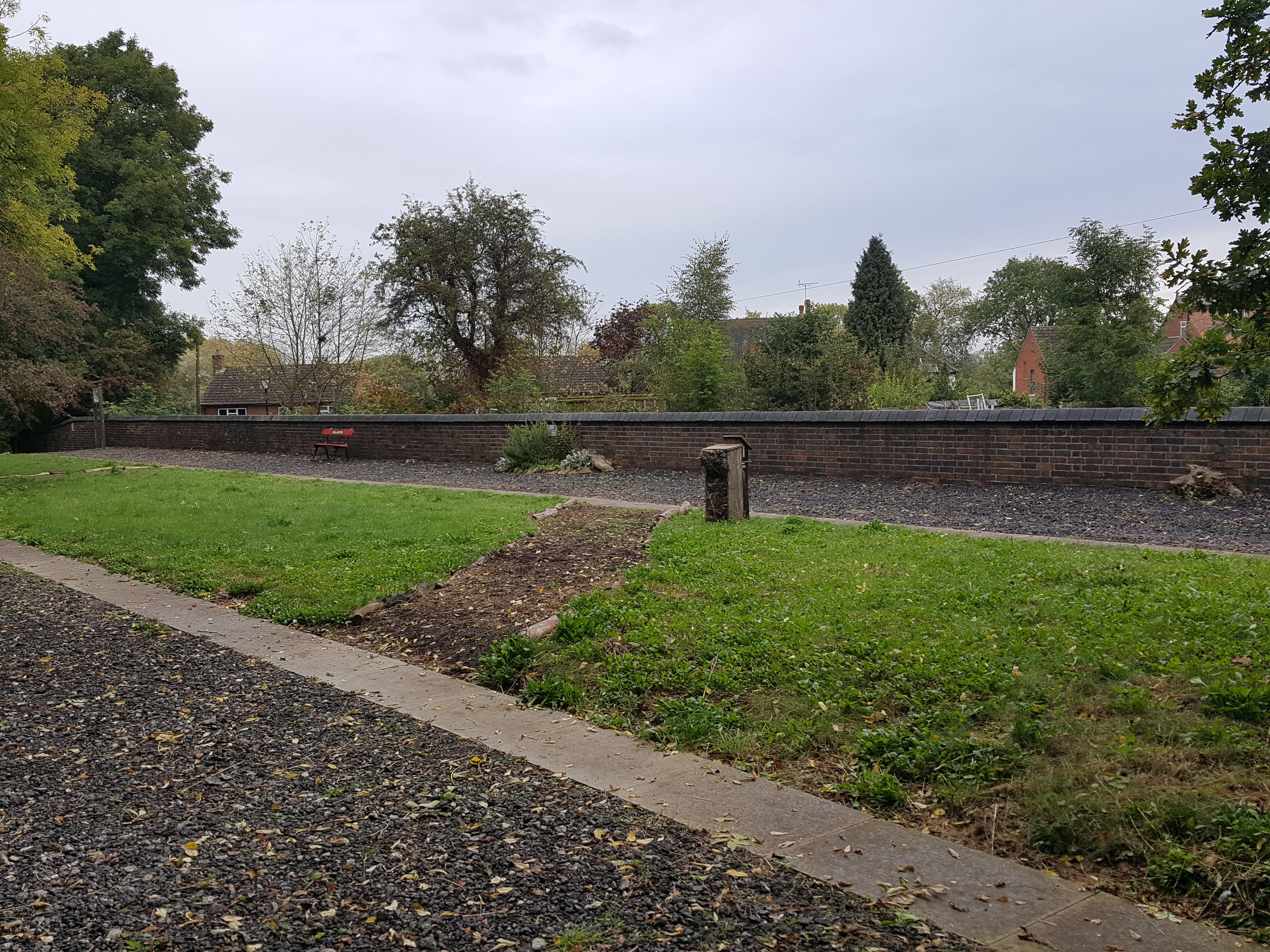
- Rolleston on Dove railway station, September 2017

General information
- Location: Rolleston on Dove, East Staffordshire; England
- Coordinates: 52.8457°N 1.6302°W
- Grid reference: SK250276
- Platforms: 2

Other information
- Status: Disused

History
- Original company: North Staffordshire Railway
- Post-grouping: London, Midland and Scottish Railway; London Midland Region of British Railways

Key dates
- 1 November 1894: Opened
- 1 January 1949: Closed
Location

Rolleston-on-Dove railway station is a disused railway station built to serve Rolleston on Dove in Staffordshire.

== History ==
The station was opened by the North Staffordshire Railway in 1894 as simply "Rolleston" but was renamed to avoid confusion with Rolleston Junction station.

The line had been opened in 1848 and, from 1878, was shared by the Great Northern Railway (Great Britain) with its GNR Derbyshire and Staffordshire Extension .

The station was about a mile from the village. It was provided with two brick-built platforms and timber buildings. A goods loop ran behind the secondary platform to serve the station yard. Rolleston-on-Dove station closed in 1949.

Preceding station	Disused railways	Following station
Tutbury Line closed, station open	North Staffordshire Railway GNR Derbyshire and Staffordshire Extension	Stretton and Claymills Line and station closed
Egginton Junction Line and station closed	Great Northern Railway GNR Derbyshire and Staffordshire Extension	Stretton and Claymills Line and station closed

== Present day ==
Although the platforms can still be seen, the timber buildings were demolished in the 1960s. A replica of the former running in board has been erected on one of the platforms.
