= Egginton =

Village in South Derbyshire, England

Coordinates: 52.851°N 1.603°W

- Location within Derbyshire
- Population: 545 (2021)
- OS grid reference: SK267283
- District: South Derbyshire
- Shire county: Derbyshire
- Region: East Midlands
- Country: England
- Sovereign state: United Kingdom
- Post town: DERBY
- Postcode district: DE65
- Dialling code: 01283
- Police: Derbyshire
- Fire: Derbyshire
- Ambulance: East Midlands
- UK Parliament: South Derbyshire

Egginton is a village and civil parish in the local government district of South Derbyshire, England. The population of the civil parish as of the 2011 census was 574.

== Location ==
The village is located just off Ryknild Street, otherwise known as the A38, between Derby and Stretton, Burton upon Trent. It is historically a farming community. Due to a historical legal situation, no alcohol is allowed to be sold in the village and hence there is no village pub.

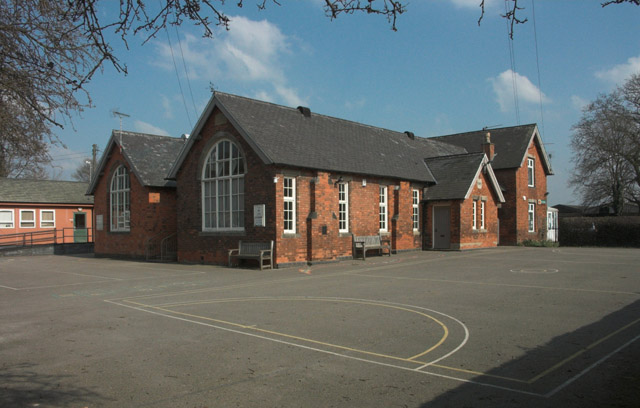
Egginton school

In Fishpond Lane there is a row of tenants' cottages, some of which have their windows bricked up, dating back to the days of window-tax.

The village does not have a war memorial in the normal sense but it has a memorial hall that doubles as the village school and as a community hall.

== Airfield ==
After the closure of the former Burnaston Airport nearby, Derby Airfield was established at Egginton. The small airfield houses a community of light aircraft owners, an aero club, and supporting aircraft maintenance firms.

== Railway ==
The railway line which passed through Egginton originally formed part of the Great Northern Railway's Derbyshire Extension route from Grantham to Stafford and was opened in April 1878. It ran from Grantham on the East Coast Main Line via Nottingham Victoria, over Bennerley Viaduct (which still stands today) to Derby Friargate Station. This section of the Great Northern Railway, also known as the Friargate Line, (for further history about this now closed railway see GNR Derbyshire and Staffordshire Extension), was built as a rival to the already established Midland Railway, which at the time had a monopoly over Derby, Nottingham and the surrounding areas.

Although most of the line was closed to passenger traffic in December 1939, Egginton station did not officially close until 3 March 1962. The station building survives as the HQ for a payroll company. The route of the line is now a cycle track and nature path with little to indicate its former status.

The section of line between Egginton Junction and Friargate was then acquired by the Train Control Group of the BR Research Division, as a suitable test track. It was singled between Friargate and Mickleover, but in 1973 the line was cut back to Mickleover since the eastern end of the track bed had been earmarked for the new A38 trunk road. Thereafter the line was used as a test track until 1990 when the A516 feeder road to the A50 by-pass was built over the trackbed and the line was closed and lifted.

== See also ==
- Listed buildings in Egginton
