= Robert Sherborne =

English bishop (died 1536)

- Bishop of St David's (1505–1508); Bishop of Chichester (1508–1536)
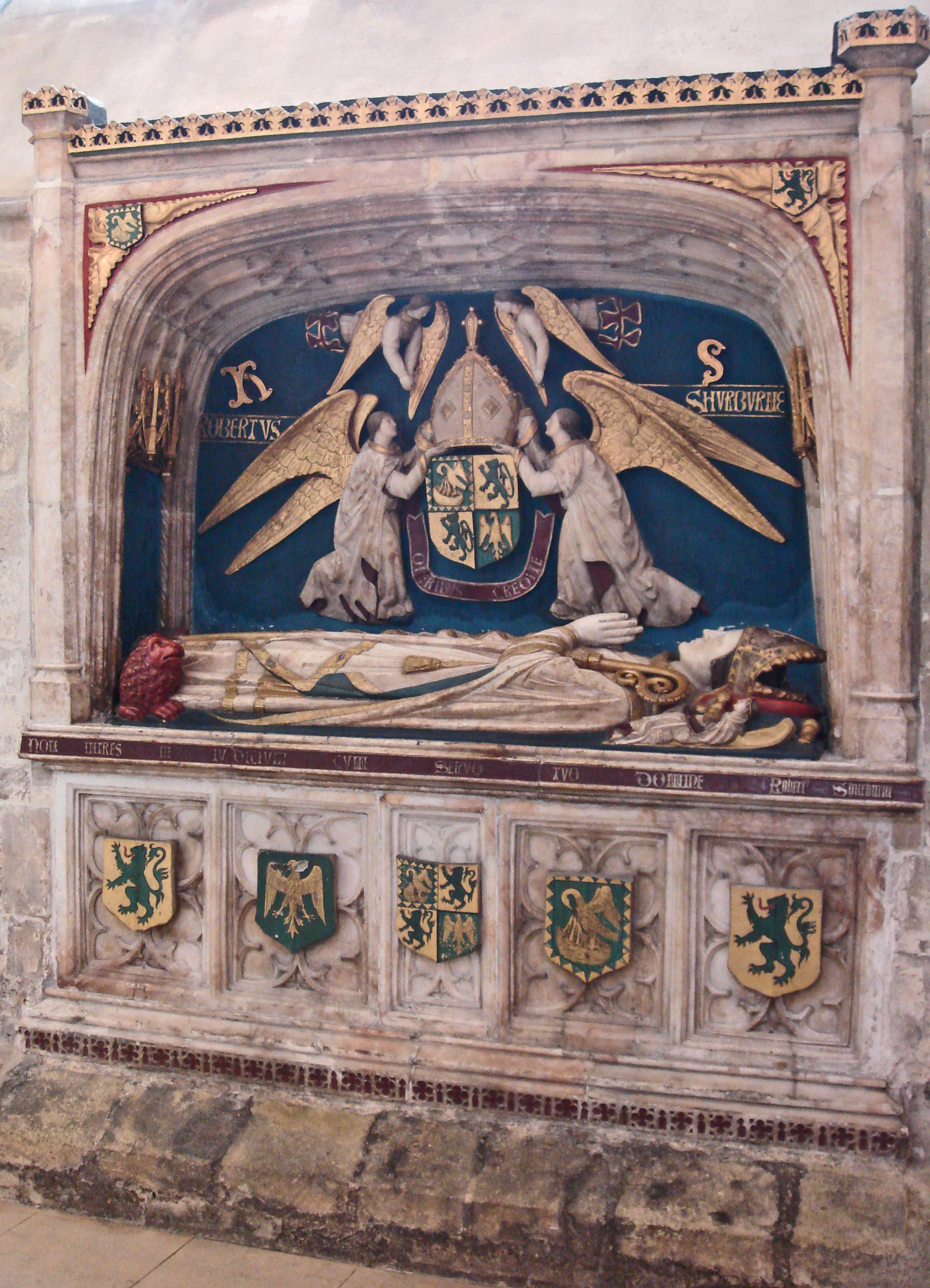
- Monument in Chichester Cathedral
- Diocese: Diocese of Chichester

Orders
- Ordination: 5 March 1501

Personal details
- Born: c. 1453 Rolleston on Dove, Staffordshire, England
- Died: 1536

Robert Sherborne (born c. 1453 died 1536) was Bishop of St David's from 1505 to 1508 and Bishop of Chichester from 1508 to 1536.

Sherborne was born in Rolleston on Dove, Staffordshire, and educated at Winchester College and New College, Oxford. He was Master of St. Cross Hospital, near Winchester and a Canon of Wells Cathedral until 1493.

Sherborne was Archdeacon of Huntingdon (1494–1496), Archdeacon of Buckingham and of Taunton (1496–1505) and Dean of St Paul's (1499–1505). Exceptionally, he held ecclesiastical posts prior to ordination: he was made a deacon in 1499 and ordained a priest on 5 March 1501. He acted as royal ambassador to the pope several times. From 1505 to 1508 he was bishop of St David's, a post he obtained by forging a papal bull. When the forgery was discovered, Henry VII wrote to the pope on his behalf. Sherborne does not seem to have been punished, and in 1508 was made bishop of Chichester, this time legitimately by a real papal bull.

Sherborne was a patron of the artist Lambert Barnard, commissioning several series of paintings from him. He founded the Free Grammar School in Rolleston, around 1520, which continued to 1909.

== Sources ==
- Concise Dictionary of National Biography
- Steer, Francis W., Robert Sherburne Bishop of Chichester: Some Aspects of his Life Reconsidered, Chichester Papers No. 16 (Chichester City Council, 1960)
