= Rolleston on Dove =

Village in East Staffordshire, England

Coordinates: 52.844499°N 1.652535°W

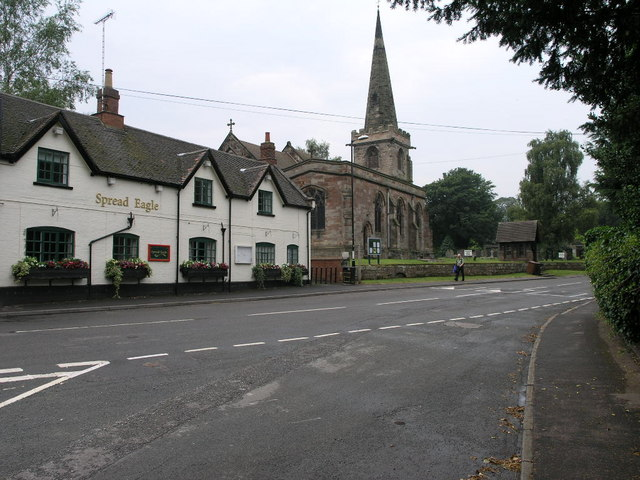
- Spread Eagle and St. Mary's (2006)

- Location within Staffordshire
- Area: 4.07 sq mi (10.5 km^{2})
- Population: 3,267 (2011)
  - Density: 803/sq mi (310/km^{2})
- OS grid reference: SK235275
  - London: 113.1 mi (182.0 km)
- Civil parish: Rolleston on Dove
- District: East Staffordshire
- Shire county: Staffordshire
- Region: West Midlands
- Country: England
- Sovereign state: United Kingdom
- Post town: BURTON-ON-TRENT
- Postcode district: DE13
- Dialling code: 01283
- Police: Staffordshire
- Fire: Staffordshire
- Ambulance: West Midlands
- UK Parliament: Burton
- Website: Rolleston on Dove Parish Council

Rolleston on Dove, also known simply as Rolleston, is a village and civil parish in the East Staffordshire district, in the county of Staffordshire, England near Burton upon Trent. On 28 March 1983 the parish was renamed from "Rolleston" to "Rolleston on Dove". According to the University of Nottingham English Place-names project, the settlement name Rolleston could mean 'Hrothwulf's farm/settlement' or 'Hrolfr's farm/settlement'. The 2011 census for Rolleston returned 1,467 households and 3,267 residents.

== History ==
Mentioned in the Domesday Book Survey of 1086, Rolleston was a settlement in the Hundred of Offlow, Staffordshire. It had recorded population of 36 households, including a priest. Rolleston was originally built around the hall, the church and the stream running through it, the Alder brook. The oldest area of the village, thought to date from the 11th century, is near the Spread Eagle Inn and Rolleston's Church, St. Mary's, together with Brookside and Burnside, although there are old houses in other parts in the village.

== Rolleston Hall ==
Sir Oswald Mosley, the founder of the British Union of Fascists spent some of his earlier years at the family seat here. Rolleston Hall, where Mosley lived, was sold by auction on 2 August 1923 for housing development. The lake and two of the entrance lodges remain. The family coat of arms are still displayed in what was originally the Victorian Commemoration Hall which is now Rolleston Club.

== Transport ==
Rolleston on Dove was served by a railway station which was opened by the North Staffordshire Railway on 1 November 1894. The station closed in 1949. Rolleston is also home to the Jinnie Trail, a former railway line in a man-made valley which was closed completely in 1968. In 1972 it was created into a rural walk stretching approximately 2 kilometres. Along the walk today, parts of the remaining stations are being revealed by an ongoing restoration project.

== Sport and leisure ==
=== Cricket ===
Rolleston Cricket Club is an English amateur cricket club with a history of cricket in the village dating back to 1871. The club ground is located on The Willows, Dovecliff Road. Rolleston field 4 Senior XI teams in the Derbyshire County Cricket League and an established Junior training section that play competitive cricket in the Burton & District Youth Cricket League.

=== RoDSEC ===
The Rolleston on Dove Special Events Committee (RoDSEC) organises many seasonal activities, including money raising events for local charities.

=== Football ===
Rolleston Football Club was a junior league club that used the Craythorne Road Football pitches for their home ground.

== Notable residents ==
- Robert Sherborne (c.1453 in Rolleston on Dove – 1536) was Dean of St Paul's 1499–1505 and Bishop of Chichester 1508–1536.
- Sir Oswald Mosley (1896–1980) politician who started in the Conservative Party migrated through the Labour Party via a party of his own creation to become English Fascist leader in the 1930s
- Robert W. Ford (1923–2013) British diplomat and radio operator arrested by the Chinese in Tibet after World War II.
- Andrew Webster (born 1959 in Rolleston on Dove) a former English cricketer who played first-class and List A cricket for Worcestershire
- Hugh Waddell (rugby league)

== See also ==
- Listed buildings in Rolleston on Dove
