= Derbyshire and Staffordshire extension =

United Kingdom railway

The Derbyshire and Staffordshire extension of the Great Northern Railway was an English railway network built by the GNR to get access to coal resources in the area to the north and west of Nottingham. The Midland Railway had obstructed the GNR in its attempts to secure a share of the lucrative business of transporting coal from the area, and in frustration the GNR built the line. The line was forked: it reached Pinxton in 1875 and a junction with the North Staffordshire Railway at Egginton, approaching Burton on Trent in 1878. The line cut through Derby, resulting in considerable demolition of housing there.

West of Derby the line was primarily agricultural; thoughts that a long-distance connection might build up using the line were over-optimistic, although a limited long-distance goods traffic did run. The GNR served holiday resorts on the East Coast of England, and a considerable excursion and holiday traffic from Derby and Nottingham was developed.

After World War I a slow decline set in, affecting both passenger and goods traffic, and the passenger service west of Derby was discontinued in 1939. The Nottingham to Derby passenger service was withdrawn in 1964. Freight business had run down gradually, and that too ceased completely in 1968. After closure to revenue traffic, part of the line was later used as an experimental test track.

== Nottingham railways ==
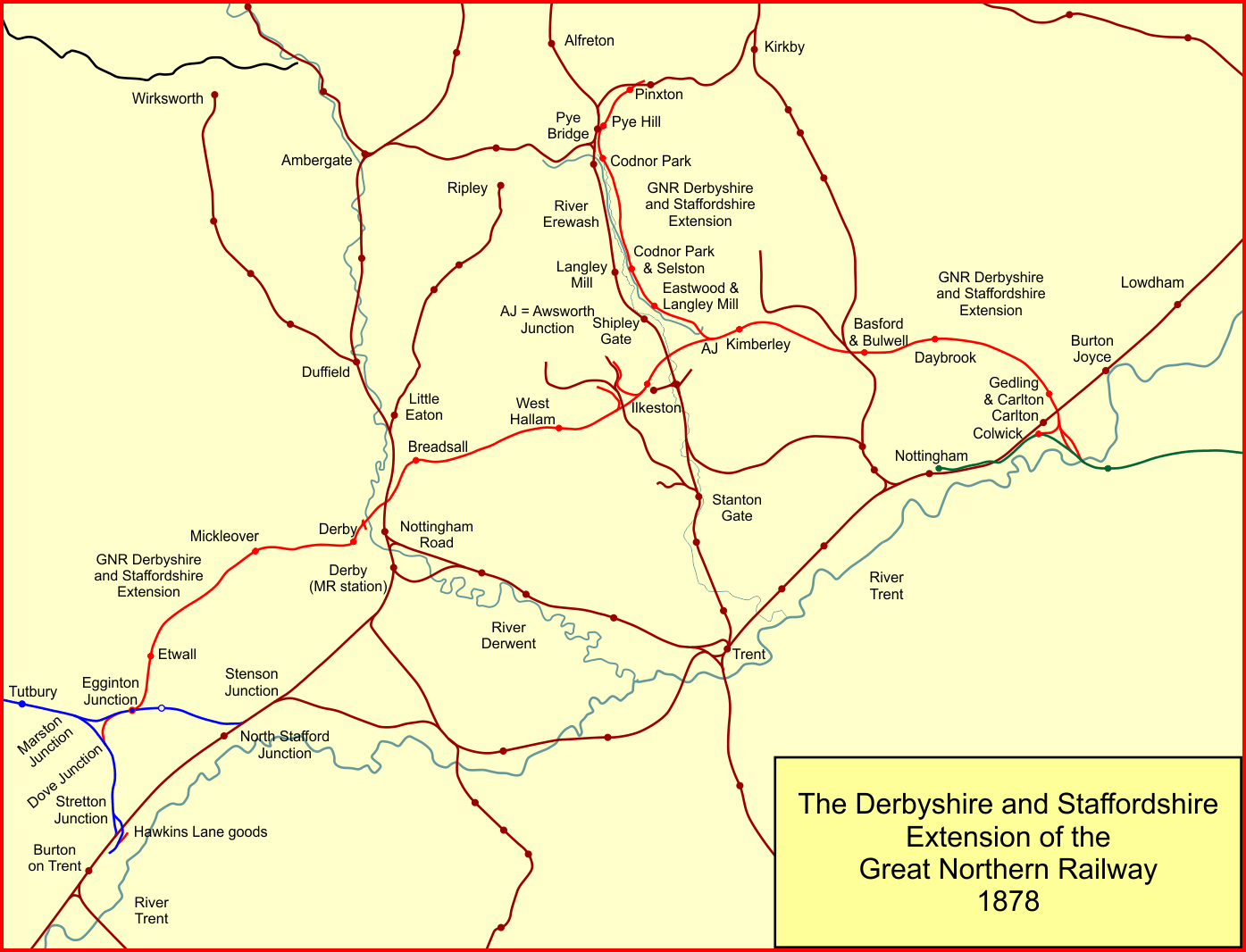
The Derbyshire and Staffordshire extension lines of the Great Northern Railway

The first railway in Nottingham opened in 1839 when the Midland Counties Railway inaugurated a line from Derby. In 1844 the Midland Counties Railway amalgamated with others and formed the Midland Railway. The MR built a new station at Nottingham on the present-day site, opening it in 1848, and the company expanded considerably in the following years, and for some time was the dominant railway company in the general area.

The mineral and commercial resources of Nottingham and its environs were attractive to other railways, and the Ambergate, Nottingham, Boston and Eastern Junction Railway opened an east–west line from Grantham to a junction at Colwick, east of Nottingham, in 1850. It made a junction with the Midland Railway at Colwick and relied on the MR for access to Nottingham. The Ambergate company had been conceived to connect the manufacturing districts of Manchester and Lancashire with the Eastern Counties and Boston docks, but the ambitious scheme never achieved the funding it would need, and it was cut back.

In 1852 the Great Northern Railway reached Grantham and made a junction with the Ambergate company there. A contractor had worked the Ambergate line at first, but now the GNR took over the operation. The Midland Railway went to great lengths to be obstructive to the GNR use of its line, in order to protect its near-monopoly. In 1857 the GNR opened its own station, London Road, at Nottingham, together with an independent line to the station from Colwick. In 1860 the GNR leased the Ambergate company for a term of 999 years.

== Derby railways ==
Derby had long been dominated by the Midland Railway, (Note: The North Staffordshire Railway approached, at Willington Junction, and the London and North Western Railway had its own goods depot in the town.) its predecessors having opened their lines in 1839 and 1840. However the Midland Railway's commercial methods had been aggressive: there was considerable resentment in Derby at the Midland Railway exploitation of its monopoly position. If another large company were to open a line to the town, this would be a highly satisfactory development.

== Haulage of coal to the south ==
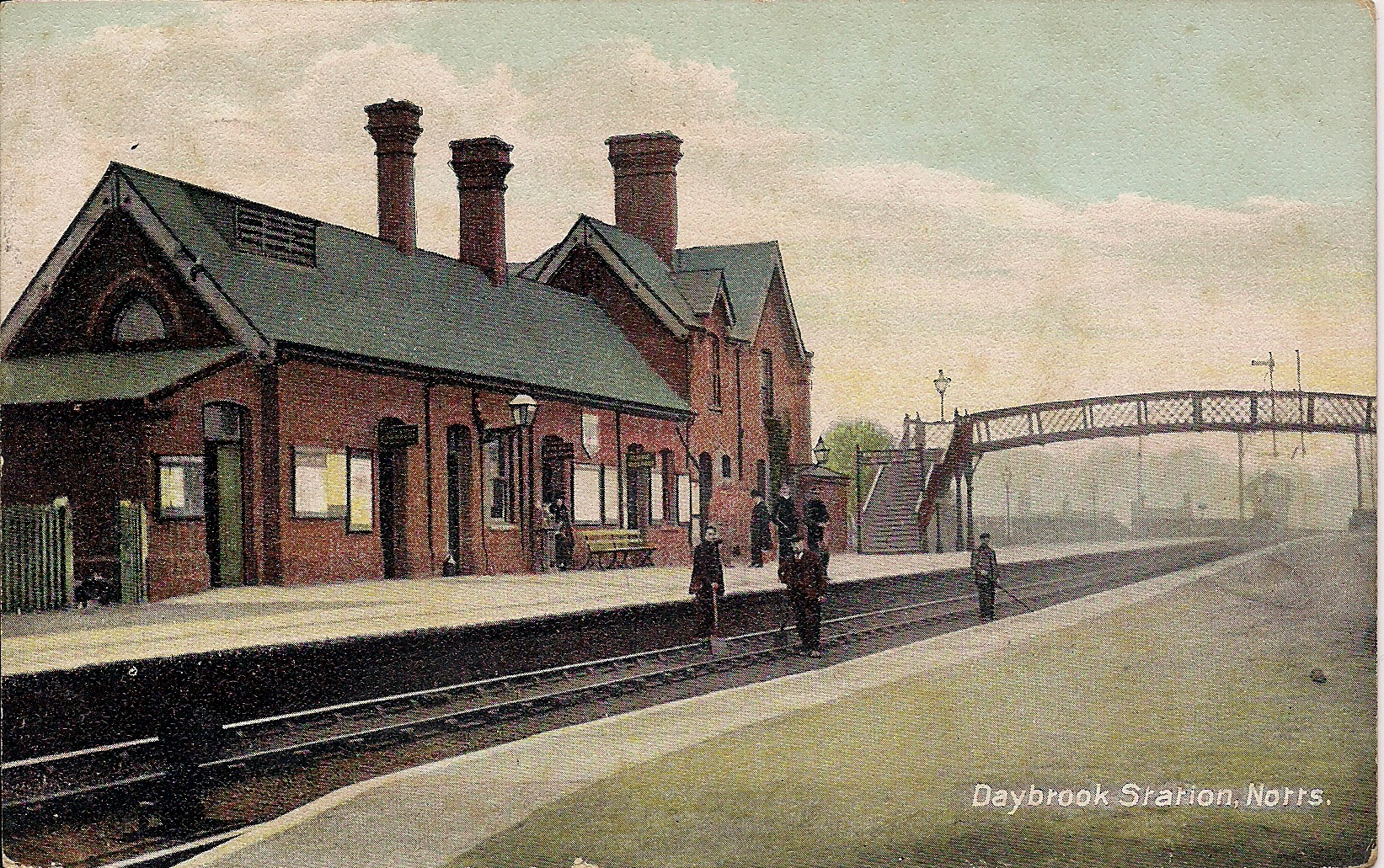
Daybrook railway station

Conveying coal from northern coalfields to London to the southern counties was a huge operation, bringing in very considerable income. The GNR had access to collieries in South and West Yorkshire, but the Midland Railway and the GNR had a traffic sharing agreement in place, which required the GNR to pay significant toll for coal passing through Nottingham. Finding this oppressive, the GNR tried in 1862 to get a line from Colwick to Codnor Park, where there was a huge ironworks, already long established, coupled with coal and iron mines dominated by the Butterley Company. The line would have extended directly westward from the GNR terminus at Nottingham (London Road) through Lenton and Radford. However the Midland Railway offered a new traffic agreement which appeared to be equitable to the GNR, and was accepted by them. In fact it stored up trouble for the future. In 1868 the Midland Railway opened its independent line from Bedford to London; hitherto it had relied on running over the GNR main line between Hitchin and London. Now no longer beholden to the GNR, it took a tougher line than ever in the Nottingham area, ending the traffic-sharing agreement. Shortly a ruinous rates war followed, and on 2 April 1871 the GNR was barred from running its coal trains through the Midland lines at all. Faced with a massive loss of income, the GNR was spurred to making its own line into the Derbyshire coalfield.

== Authorisation of GNR line ==
This scheme was to be much more ambitious than the 1862 plan, designed to reach as far as Burton on Trent. As the GNR prepared the necessary parliamentary bill, the Midland saw that its monopoly was now under threat, and offered to resume the previous arrangements at Nottingham, but this was too late: the GNR had had enough. Thus in 1872 the GNR proposed a line that would run north from Colwick, and then west to Kimberley. The northern route around Nottingham avoided crossing the inner area of Nottingham from east to west, and linked in with large, hitherto unexploited, coal reserves in the Bestwood estate of the Duke of St Albans. Nevertheless, the new route had engineering challenges of its own. Just west of Kimberley, the line was to divide, one arm running north to Codnor Park and Pinxton, paralleling the Midland Railway Erewash Valley line. The other arm would continue westward through Ilkeston to Derby and Burton on Trent. From Burton, GNR trains would be able to reach Stafford using running powers over the North Stafford Railway. This westward connection would enable a route for outward mineral flows as an alternative to running through Colwick. The terrain west of Ilkeston was agricultural rather than mineral-bearing. The planned route involved prodigious engineering challenges and steep gradients, as more convenient alignments were already occupied by the Midland Railway.

Great Northern Railway (Derbyshire and Staffordshire) Act 1872
- Act of Parliament
- Parliament of the United Kingdom
- Long title: An Act to enable the Great Northern Railway Company to construct Railways in Nottinghamshire and Derbyshire; and for other purposes with relation to the same Company.
- Citation: 35 & 36 Vict. c. cxxxix

Dates
- Royal assent: 25 July 1872

The line was to cut directly through Derby, requiring the demolition of many slum properties. Politically and commercially influential people in the town were favourable to the GNR, but it is suggested that there was some naivety in the easy approval of the GNR's intentions. The project was authorised on 25 July 1872 by the Great Northern Railway (Derbyshire and Staffordshire) Act 1872 (35 & 36 Vict. c. cxxxix); in addition to the main goods depot off Friar Gate, a subsidiary yard was planned in Duke Street, giving access to a centre of industrial activity there. This was authorised in 1874, and involved a northward spur running down from the main line at Darley Lane Junction, some way north east from Friargate, to a shunting neck on the riverside. From here a southward reversal was necessary to reach the goods yard itself.

== Construction and first openings ==
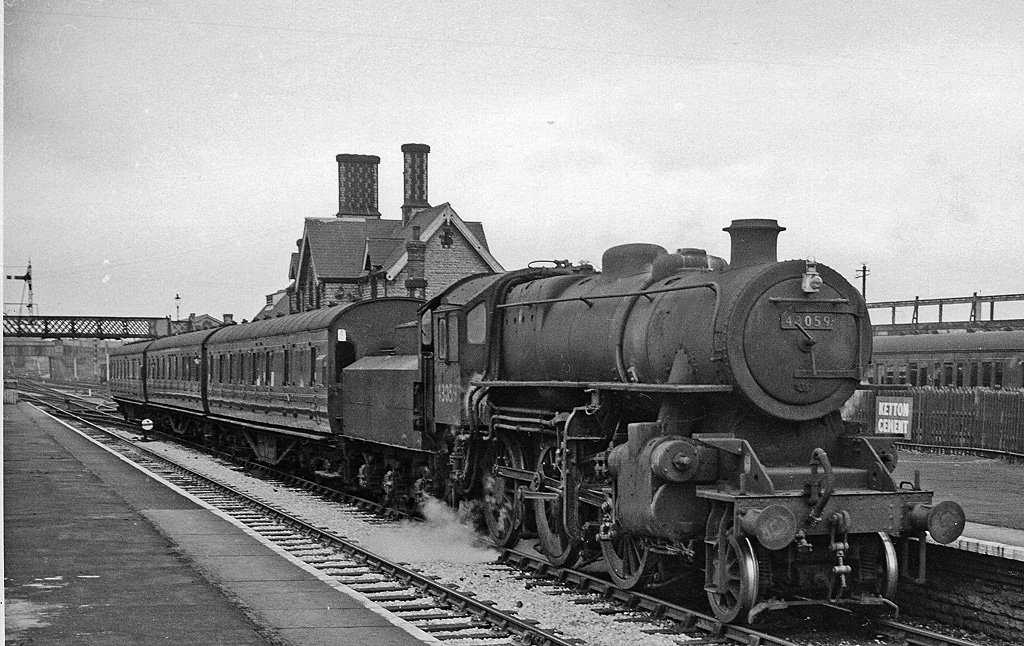
The 17.18 Nottingham (Victoria) to Derby (Friargate) service at Basford North in 1963

The first construction was concentrated on the route to Pinxton, the northern arm of the Y-shaped route, turning north at Awsworth Junction, just beyond Kimberley. The mineral resources of the area it would serve would be much more lucrative than the agriculture in the western areas. At Colwick a large triangle of lines was created, forming junctions with the Grantham line at Colwick West and East Junctions, coming together at North Junction. Colwick was planned to be the collection point for loaded and empty wagons in connection with the colliery traffic, and an engine shed and sidings for 650 full wagons and 500 empties were laid out there; cottages were erected for the staff.

The line was difficult to construct; earthworks were heavy, especially between Bulwell and Kimberley. There was a tunnel 1,132 yards (1,035 m) long at Mapperley, and Giltbrook Viaduct, 60-foot (18.3 m) high with 43 arches crossing the Midland Railway west of Kimberley, a viaduct crossing another Midland branch at Bulwell, and Watnall tunnel, 268 yards (245 m), east of Kimberley.

The line from Colwick junctions to Pinxton opened on 23 August 1875 for mineral traffic. The great rock cutting at Kimberley was still not completed when passenger trains began, and there was only a single track for a distance of 1 1/4 miles (2.0 km). Single-line working was set up temporarily, and blasting was stopped while trains were in the cutting. It was not until February 1877 that the second line was sanctioned for passenger traffic, making the route double throughout.

The search for coal traffic was successful: 115,000 tonnes (113,000 long tons; 127,000 short tons) of coal were carried in the first six months. Passenger trains operated from Nottingham to New Basford from 1 February 1876, and passenger opening took place as far as Pinxton on 1 August 1876. There were seven passenger trains each way on weekdays, increased to nine each way on weekdays and three each way on Sundays. The company gave an undertaking to the Board of Trade inspecting officer that passenger trains would be worked by tank engines; this avoided the necessity of providing a turntable. Almost immediately after opening a man was struck and killed by a goods engine running tender-first, so a turntable was installed there and a small engine shed built.

== Derby and Burton branch ==
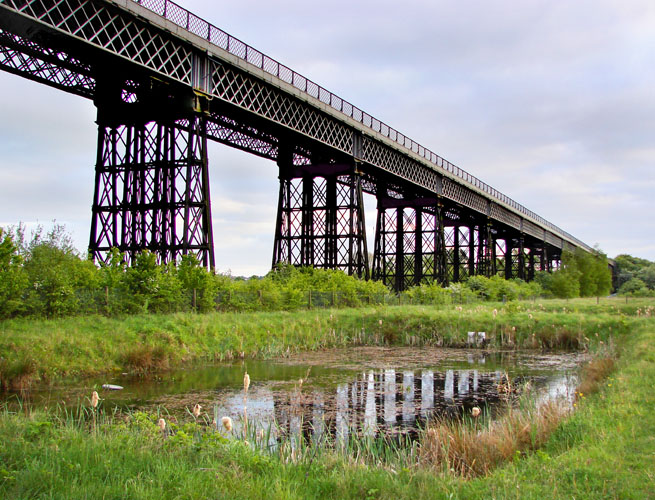
Bennerley Viaduct, Ilkeston in May 2009

The continuation of the Derby part of the line, from Awsworth Junction to Derby and Burton-on-Trent was started in 1875. Beyond Awsworth junction there were two tunnels, Morley (238 yards (218 m)) between West Hallam and Breadsall, and Mickleover (464 yards (424 m)). There were 11 viaducts including Derby Town viaduct, 310 yards (283 m) long. Bennerley Viaduct at Ilkeston was an exceptional structure:

Bennerley Viaduct was one of several wrought iron railway viaducts built in the short period when this material had largely superseded cast iron and before it was in turn superseded by steel. Now Bennerley is one of the only two remaining viaducts of this type (the other is at Meldon Viaduct in Devon). It strides for a quarter of a mile across the flat floor of the Erewash valley on the Nottinghamshire-Derbyshire border, having 16 Warren girder spans of 77 feet mounted on tubular piers. The piers each comprise a group of 10 vertical wrought iron tubes, made up of quadrants with continuous longitudinal riveted flanges, with an additional raking tube at each side and with wrought-iron bolted cross-bracing, standing on concrete bases capped with bricks and gritstone. The piers support four lines of Warren girders, 8 feet deep. The decking is of corrugated troughs, which halved the quantity of ballast needed, at an almost constant height of 56 feet above the ground, surmounted by lattice parapets 26 feet apart. At the west end of the Warren spans are three iron girder spans, on brick piers... The GNR Chief Engineer at the time was Richard Johnson and the contractors Eastwood Swingler & Co. of Derby.

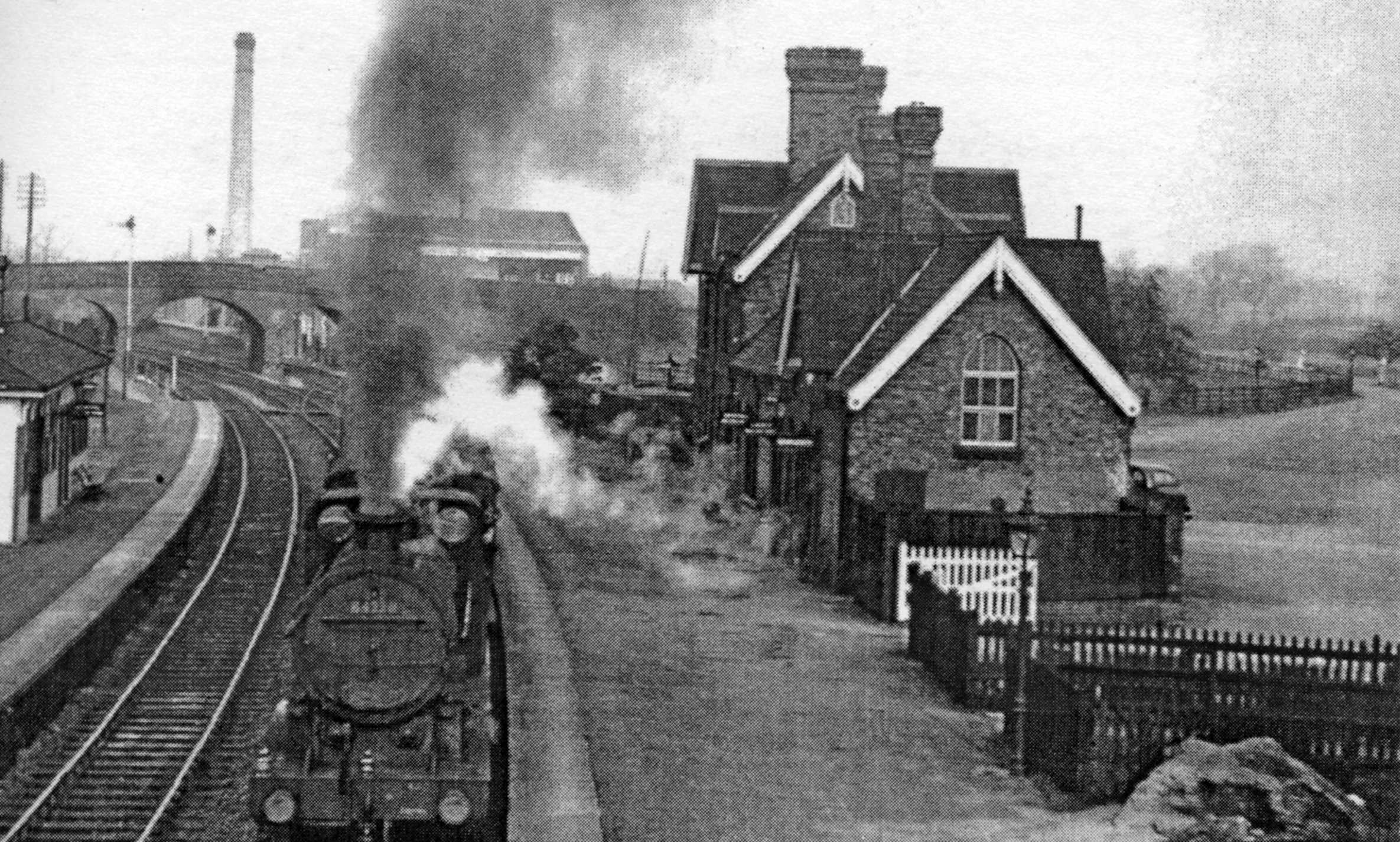
Egginton Junction railway station, 1949

On 24 January 1878 the GNR ran a special train throughout from Grantham to Egginton, distributing station equipment in readiness for opening. The line from Awsworth junction to Egginton East junction, 18 miles 55 chains (30.1 km), was brought into use for goods and mineral traffic on 28 January 1878. Passenger trains from Nottingham began on 1 April, with four trains each way on weekdays and two on Sundays running through to Tutbury on the North Staffordshire line, and another five each way on weekdays and one on Sundays terminating at Derby. Through running of goods trains to Stafford was possible from that date, as from 23 December 1867 the GNR had taken over the working the Stafford and Uttoxeter Railway, although passenger working did not begin until the GNR acquired that line in 1881.

The western end of the line converged with the North Staffordshire Railway line at Egginton, but immediately beyond there the GNR line diverged southwards for 1 mile 23 chains (2.1 km) to Dove junction on the North Staffordshire Railway branch line to Burton on Trent; this east curve opened in January 1878 for goods and minerals and on 1 July 1878 for passengers. The GNR had originally intended to build its own passenger station at Burton, but ultimately agreed to use the Midland station, due to the limited availability of land in the town. Until this arrangement was finalised, passengers for Burton changed to the NSR at Tutbury. Burton station was later rebuilt and enlarged as a result of the increased business, opening in 1883.

The GNR goods sidings at Burton were not ready until 1 April, and until then it was allowed use of the Midland's sidings at Wetmore junction. The new GNR goods depot at Hawkins Lane was brought into use on 1 August. There was extensive trip working to breweries and the GNR worked over the Midland connecting lines. The NSR gave running powers to the GNR between Egginton Junction and Bromshall Junction, and also on to Stoke-on-Trent, and the NSR was granted running powers to Nottingham and Pinxton, which it exercised for coal traffic to Colwick, and excursions and other specials to Nottingham.

== Derby station and traffic ==
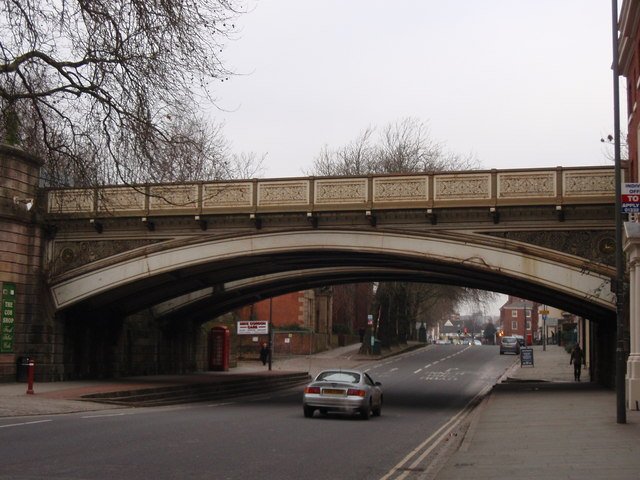
Friar Gate bridge, Derby

Derby station was to be built as a lavish, first-class station. However the construction had already greatly overrun cost estimates, and the architectural features of the station were toned down to save money. Nevertheless, it had four platforms, in the hope that the North Staffordshire Railway and the London and North Western Railway would use the station; however these changes did not take place, and the outer platforms at Derby saw little use. The GNR's hopes that "a new route from Derby to London" would bring in significant volumes of passenger business were illusory.

Goods traffic was buoyant, however, both long-distance and local. In the 1880s the Friargate goods yard had to be extended. The GNR used the line to reach the Staffordshire Potteries and using running powers agreed with the NSR, operated a goods train every Monday from Peterborough to Stoke-on-Trent from 1896, and a Boston to Stoke-on-Trent working Tuesday to Saturday from 1901.

== Extensions ==
The point of convergence of the new line with the NSR line at Egginton was just beyond the existing NSR station, so that the station could not be used by GNR trains. It soon became clear that an exchange station was necessary, as was a new station at Colwick, and the decision to provide them was taken on 5 April 1878. Accordingly, a new Egginton Junction station, joint with the NSR, was opened on 1 July, and from that time the old NSR station was used only for goods. An island-platform station was built at Colwick, on the Nottingham side of Colwick West junction; it was first shown in the June 1878 timetable but had probably been brought into use in May. A refreshment room was later provided.

== Cost and benefit ==
The parliamentary estimate for the Derbyshire and Staffordshire Extension Railway had been £1,295,525, but actual expenditure was £2,408,299. The excess was mainly accounted for by the colliery branches and sidings; the station, sidings, engine shed and other facilities at Colwick; the engine sheds at Pinxton, Egginton, Gedling and Newthorpe stations; cottages for staff; alterations to bridges as required by the Board of Trade; the additional length of the Ilkeston and Dove viaducts; Duke Street sidings at Derby; and the cost of 44 1/2 acres (18.0 ha) acres of land at Derby, amounting to £207,861, or almost £1 per square yard (£0.84 per square metre). Nevertheless, the value of the Derbyshire lines was soon demonstrated for, whereas in 1875 the tonnage of coal carried by the GNR, from collieries served by the Midland Railway, (traffic handed over to the GNR by the MR for onward transit) amounted to 440,685 tonnes (433,725 long tons; 485,772 short tons), the figure in 1879 was 373,807 tonnes (367,903 long tons; 412,052 short tons) plus 539,582 tonnes (531,060 long tons; 594,787 short tons) from the collieries served directly by the GNR.

Later the GNR conceded running powers to Pinxton, Hawkins Lane, Heanor, and the Stanton branches to the London and North Western Railway. That company took full advantage of the facility, and in the years from 1885 was carrying more than a quarter of the mineral tonnage through Colwick.

== Stafford and Uttoxeter Railway ==
The GNR was induced to acquire the moribund Stafford and Uttoxeter Railway in 1882 for £100,000. Running powers to Shrewsbury existed and the connectivity this offered must have seemed attractive to the GNR. However the acquisition was not a great commercial success.

== Stanton mineral branches ==
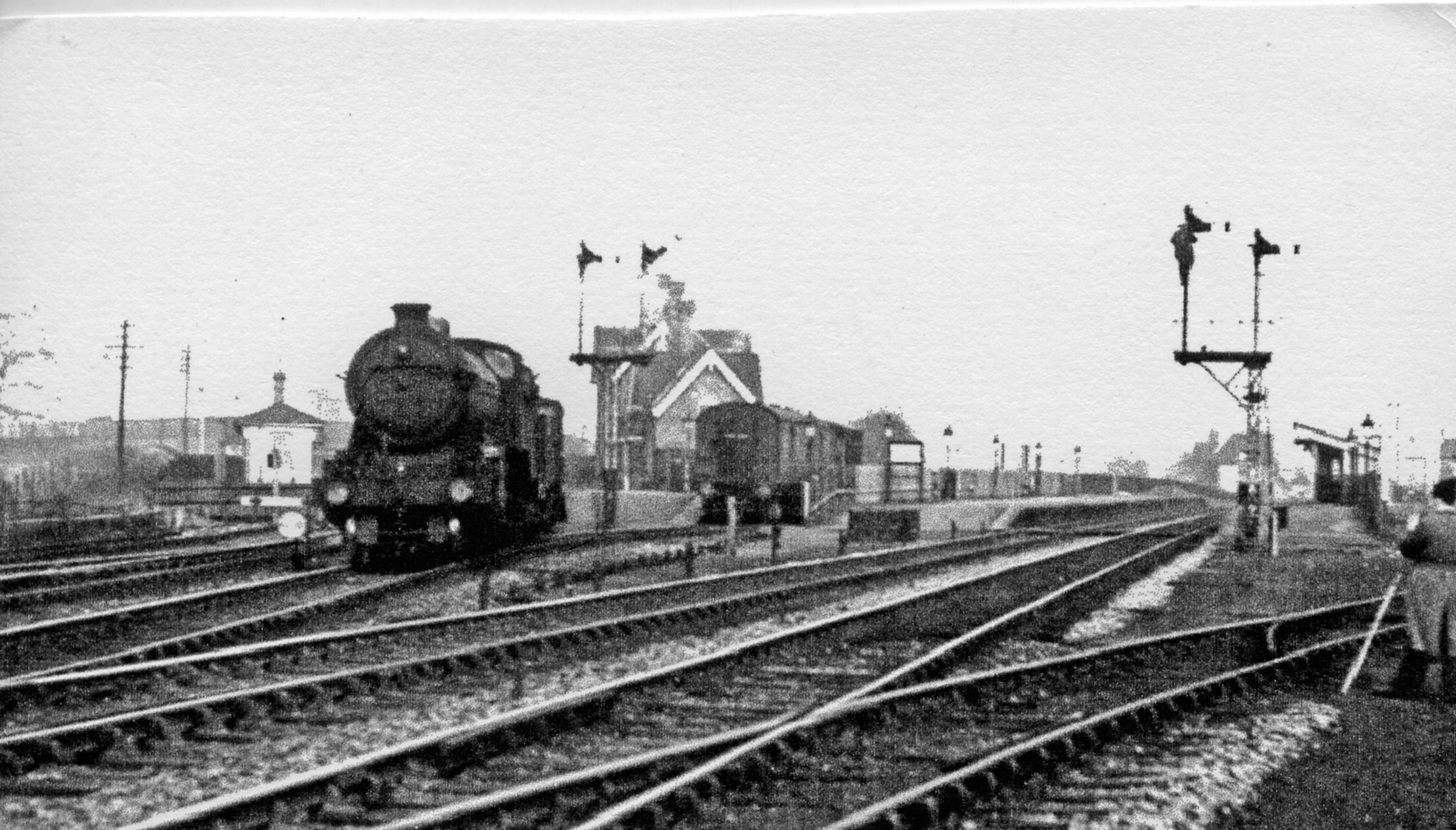
Egginton Junction, 1949

In 1882 a number of short branches near Stanton, west of Ilkeston, were authorised. They connected the Trowell Iron Company and Ilkeston Colliery, as well as Hallam Field Iron Works. They opened in 1884 and 1885.

== Heanor branch ==
In 1880 the GNR obtained an Act authorising a 71 chain branch from Ilkeston to Shipley Colliery, but this was altered to make a Heanor branch, authorised by an Act of 16 July 1885, and a short line from it to Nutbrook Colliery. The Nutbrook section was built first, and coal traffic began over a single line on 7 June 1886. For the time being, the continuation to Heanor was not started. In 1891 it was time to proceed with the Heanor branch construction; it was to be a passenger line with an intermediate station at Marlpool. The line was opened for passengers (six or seven trains each way on weekdays only) and coal, on 1 July 1891, and general goods on 1 January 1892. There were nine trains each way in 1910, but the service was withdrawn on 30 April 1928 except for a workmen's service which lasted until 4 December 1939, and goods traffic until 1963.

== Colwick extended ==
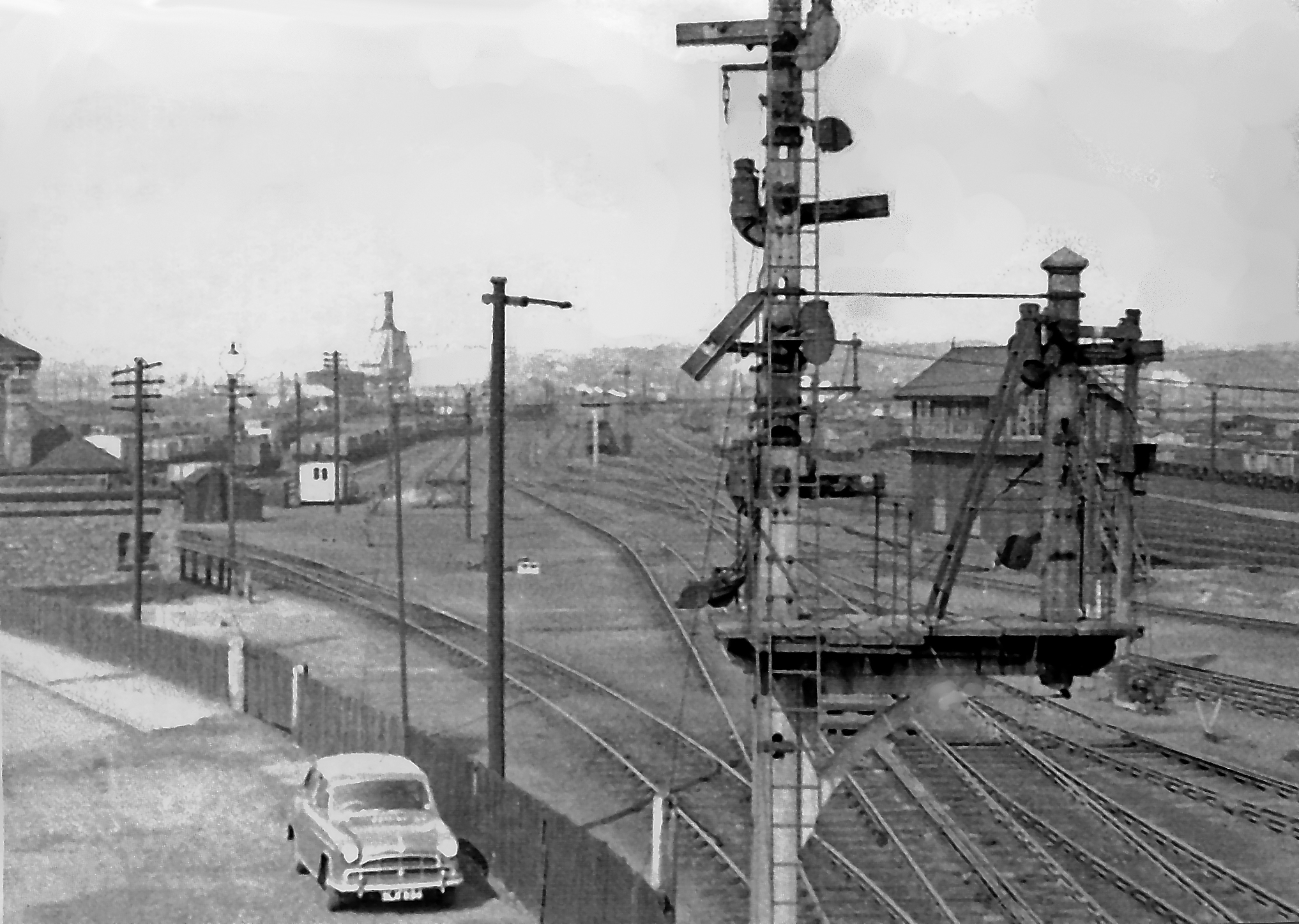
Colwick Marshalling Yard

The Nottingham to Grantham line was the GNR's primary outlet for the heavy mineral traffic, and the decision was taken to widen the section nearest Nottingham (from Saxondale Junction) to four tracks. The junction at Colwick was moved further towards Grantham and further siding accommodation was provided in the space newly enclosed by the relocated route. The new junction was called Rectory Junction. The work was finished on 23 November 1891, but in 1896–7, still more sidings were provided, together with a wagon shop and a new engine shed. In 1900, additional sorting sidings were provided, with 29 roads, and room for 1,100 vehicles. The total capacity of the yard was 6,000. All sorting was by gravity: there were 67 down roads, and 68 up.

== Holiday traffic ==
In the closing years of the nineteenth century and the first decades of the twentieth, railway excursions, and trains to holiday destinations became increasingly important. Race meetings in quite distant locations were served from the Derby and Nottingham line. In July 1909, the GNR ran a daily through 'restaurant car express service' from Friargate to Sheringham, Cromer, Yarmouth and Lowestoft, departing at 11:40 and reaching Lowestoft at 17:08. From 1909, there was a through carriage between Nottingham, Derby and Llandudno in co-operation with the NSR and the LNWR. On Whit-Monday 1895 over 1,000 passengers booked from Friargate to Skegness, 165 to York and Scarborough, 150 to Bottesford (for Belvoir Castle), 95 to Mablethorpe, 65 to Ashbourne (for Dovedale), 40 to Sutton-on-Sea, 40 to Grantham and 30 to Boston.

== After 1923, and closure ==
The railway had declined considerably during World War I, and following the Railways Act 1921 most of the main line railways of Great Britain were "grouped" into one or other of four new large companies. The Great Northern Railway was a constituent of the London and North Eastern Railway (LNER). The industrial and colliery activity in the area served by the line declined, and road competition sharpened considerably, seriously reducing the viability of the line. The Midland Railway was a constituent of the new London, Midland and Scottish Railway (LMS), so that the competition continued.

In 1939 the wartime emergency was considered to require a drastic reduction of the passenger services between Derby and Burton. In fact bus competition had already resulted in reduction of the service to eight trains in each direction compared with eleven in 1922. From 4 December 1939 the passenger service west of Derby was discontinued when both services were completely withdrawn and Mickleover, Etwall, Egginton Junction (LNER platforms only), and the stations between Uttoxeter and Stafford closed to passengers. The service between Derby and Nottingham was also substantially reduced, comprising nine eastbound trains (10 on Saturdays) and 10 westbound (11 on Saturdays) in May 1941, with a Sunday service of three to Grantham and two return.

During World War II a military ordnance depot was opened at West Hallam in 1941, with an extensive internal siding network.

Burton and Stafford services finished on 4 December 1939 but holiday trains and excursions ran west of Derby until 7 September 1964.

The railways were nationalised in 1948. Duke Street goods yard was closed in 1948, and the former Stafford and Uttoxeter Railway route closed in 1951. However through freight between Colwick and Burton on Trent was still buoyant. Meanwhile, passenger business sank further, and the passenger service between Derby and Nottingham was discontinued on 7 September 1964.

On 6 May 1968 the Derbyshire Extension was closed to all commercial traffic between Ilkeston (Stanton Junction), Egginton Junction, and Burton (Hawkins Lane), and the remainder of the ex-GNR system north and west of Nottingham closed too within the following few weeks.

The track from Derby Friargate to Egginton Junction was retained for experimental use by the British Railways Railway Technical Centre, based in Derby. This was cut back to the shorter section between Mickleover and Egginton after 26 November 1971. This was finally lifted between July and October 1990, to aid the construction of the A516 road's Etwall bypass. The A516 crosses the railway route slightly east of Etwall station, and opened in February 1992.

== Locations ==
- Colwick; opened May 1878; renamed Netherfield & Colwick 1 May 1883; renamed Netherfield 6 May 1974; still open;
- Gedling & Carlton; opened 1 February 1876; closed 4 April 1960;
- Gedling Colliery Platform; miners' station; opened 8 January 1906; closed before 1940;
- Daybrook; opened 1 February 1876; closed 4 April 1960;
- Leen Valley Junction;
- New Basford; opened 1 February 1876; renamed Basford & Bulwell 1 August 1876; renamed Basford North 21 September 1953; closed 7 September 1964;
- Kimberley; opened 1 August 1876; renamed Kimberley East 1955; closed 7 September 1964;
- Awsworth Junction;
- Newthorpe, Greasley & Shipley Gate; opened 1 August 1876; closed 7 January 1963;
- Eastwood & Langley Mill; opened 1 August 1876; closed 7 January 1963;
- Codnor Park; opened 1 August 1876; renamed Codnor Park for Ironville and Jacksdale 22 May 1901; renamed Jacksdale in 1952 or 1953; closed 7 January 1963;
- Pye Hill; opened 24 March 1877; renamed Pye Hill & Somercotes 8 January 1906; closed 7 January 1963;
- Pinxton; opened 1 August 1876; renamed Pinxton South 1954; closed 7 January 1963.

- Awsworth Junction; above;
- Ilkeston; opened 1 April 1878; renamed Ilkeston North 1954; closed 7 September 1964;
- West Hallam; opened 1 April 1878; closed 7 September 1964;
- Breadsall; opened 1 April 1878; closed 6 April 1953;
- Derby Racecourse Siding; op 16 March 1885 for horses and attendants only; used to 1938 at least;
- Derby; opened 1 April 1878; renamed Derby Friargate 1881; closed 7 September 1964;
- Mickleover; opened 1 April 1878; closed 4 December 1939; excursions called later;
- Etwall; opened 1 April 1878; closed 4 October 1939; excursions called later until at least 11 August 1961;
- Egginton Junction; on North Staffordshire Railway; former GN platforms closed on 4 December 1939; former North Staffordshire Railway platforms closed 5 March 1962;
- Dove Junction; final convergence with North Staffordshire Railway towards Burton on Trent.
