= Ilkeston railway station (disambiguation) =

Ilkeston railway station may refer to several stations in England:

- Ilkeston railway station (Opened 2017)
- Ilkeston Junction and Cossall railway station (1847–1967)
- Ilkeston North railway station (1878–1964)
- Ilkeston Town railway station (1847–1950)
