= Heanor railway station (Midland Railway) =

Former railway station in Derbyshire, England

Coordinates: 53.0183°N 1.3573°W

Heanor

General information
- Location: Heanor, Amber Valley; England

Other information
- Status: Disused

History
- Original company: Midland Railway
- Pre-grouping: Midland Railway
- Post-grouping: London Midland and Scottish Railway

Key dates
- 2 June 1890: Station opens
- 1 January 1917: closed
- 3 May 1920: reopened
- 4 May 1926: Station closed to passengers
- 1 September 1951: Station closed to goods
Location

Heanor railway station was a railway station which served the town of Heanor in Derbyshire, England. It was opened in 1890 by the Midland Railway on its branch between Langley Mill (Branch) railway station on the Erewash Valley Line and Ripley

There was a second station also named Heanor on the branch from Ilkeston of the Great Northern Railway Derbyshire Extension line. A Midland timetable in July 1922 noted "nearly 1 mile to Great Northern Station"

== History ==
The line came into being as competition for the GNR's branch. It was completed as far as Heanor by 1890, a year before the GNR station opened, but took another five years to reach Langley Mill .

The station was to the east of Woodend Road and a section was accordingly renamed Midland Road. It was built in a cutting with an overbridge for the roadway, with the booking hall next to it. A short path from this led to a footbridge with steps down to each platform.

Having been built for colliery traffic, passengers were an incidental, so only a shuttle was considered necessary. However, some trains ran between Nottingham and Ambergate or Chesterfield. One particularly complex service ran from Nottingham through Basford and Kimberley to Ilkeston Town, then via Langley Mill to Ripley and Butterley to Chesterfield.

Services ended during the First World War, but the line reopened in 1920. In the Grouping of all lines into four main companies in 1923 the station became part of the London, Midland and Scottish Railway . From 1914 the line had been in competition with the Ripley Rattlers a tramcar service opened by the Nottinghamshire and Derbyshire Tramways Company. To reduce costs a Sentinel Steam Railcar was introduced in 1925, but the line finally closed to passengers with the General Strike the following year.

Throughout their lives, both stations had been named simply Heanor, but in 1950, British Railways renamed them Heanor North and Heanor South. However the Midland station finally closed in 1951.

The road level buildings remain as a private dwelling. One of the only hints of its former use is a replica Heanor north totem affixed to a wall. the cutting has been filled in.

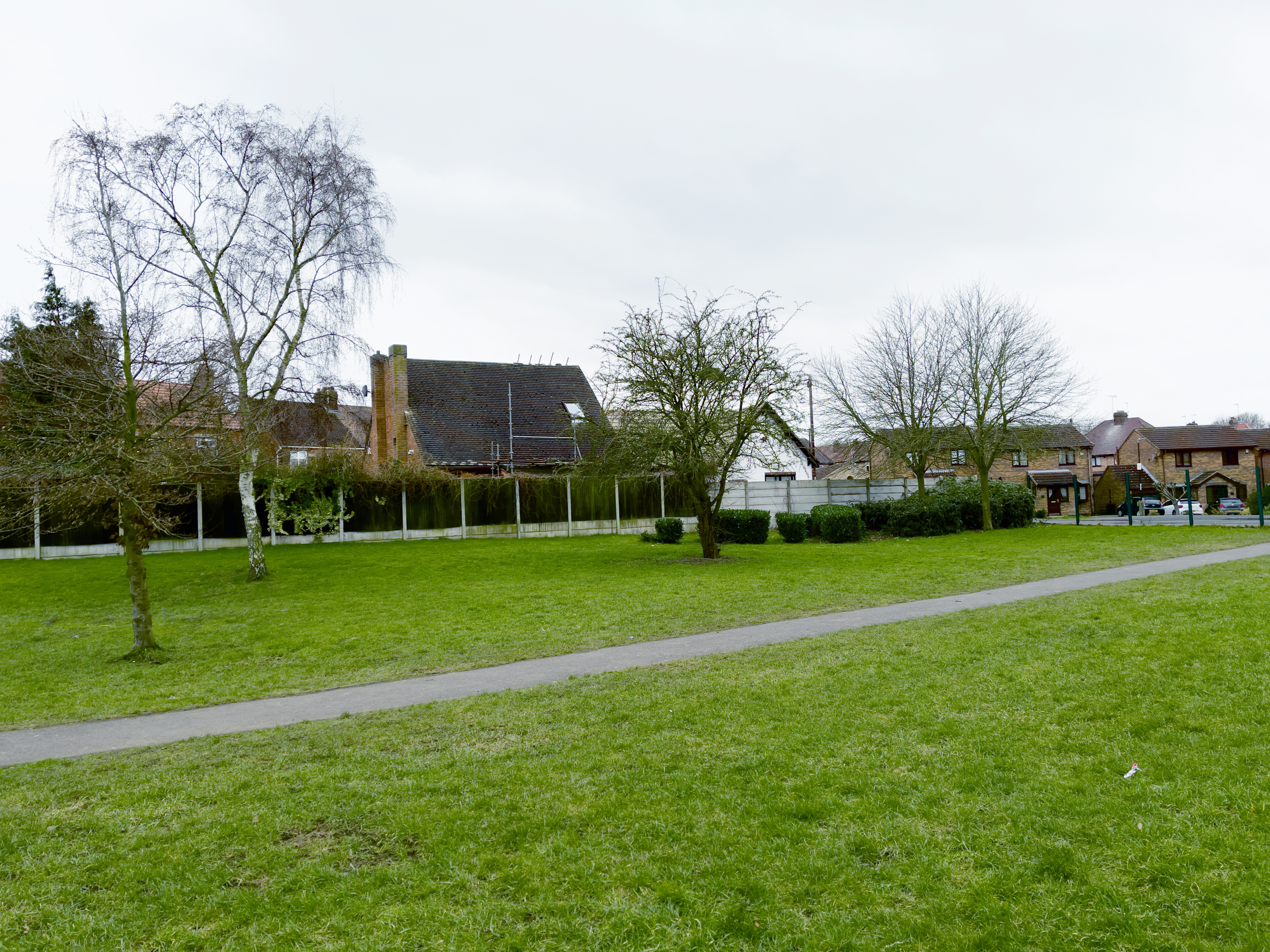
Image taken from the approximate location of the Up platform of the former Heanor Midland Station, facing in the direction of the line towards Crosshill.

Preceding station	Historical railways	Following station
Shipley Gate; Line and station closed	Midland Railway; Ripley to Erewash Valley branch line	Crosshill and Codnor; Line closed, station closed
Langley Mill (branch); Line closed, station closed	Midland Railway; Langley Mill branch line	Crosshill and Codnor; Line closed, station closed
