= Langley Mill railway station (Erewash Valley line) =

Former railway station in Derbyshire, England

Langley Mill

General information
- Location: Langley Mill, Amber Valley; England
- Coordinates: 53.0177°N 1.3315°W

Other information
- Status: Disused

History
- Pre-grouping: Midland Railway
- Post-grouping: London Midland and Scottish Railway

Key dates
- 1 October 1895: Station opens
- 1 January 1917: closed
- 3 May 1920: reopened
- 4 May 1926: Station closes
Location

Langley Mill railway station was a railway station which served the village of Langley Mill in Derbyshire, England. It was opened in 1895 by the Midland Railway on its branch between Heanor Junction on the Erewash Valley Line and Ripley.

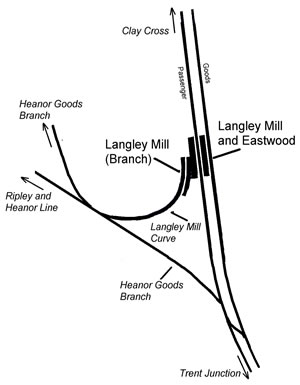
Langley Mill railway station in relation to its lines and the adjacent Langley Mill and Eastwood station on the Erewash Valley Line.

There was already a station on the Erewash Line, known as Langley Mill and Eastwood, and a Great Northern station called Eastwood and Langley Mill, which opened in 1847 and 1876 respectively. Because this branch station had no passenger connection to the earlier one, it was regarded by the railway as a separate station and was even shown as such on Ordnance Survey maps even though the platforms were adjacent.

Snip from Nineteenth Century Ordnance Survey map showing two stations. This carried on until at least 1940

== History ==
The line came into being as competition for the GNR's branch. It was completed as far as Heanor by 1890. It took another five years to reach Langley Mill where it joined a line called the Heanor Goods Branch which actually connected to a Butterley Company line to a group of collieries around Heanor. It then passed along a short tightly curved spur to reach the platform with its own waiting room and toilet. A runaround loop was provided but no means for turning.

The line had been built for colliery traffic and passengers were an incidental, so only a shuttle was considered necessary. However, some trains ran between Nottingham and Ambergate or Chesterfield. One particularly complex service ran from Nottingham through Basford and Kimberley to Ilkeston Town, then via Langley Mill through Ripley and Butterley to Chesterfield.

Services ended during the First World War, and the Kimberley Line closed completely. After the war the Langley Mill to Ripley line reopened in 1920. In the Grouping of all lines, into four main companies, in 1923 the station became part of the London, Midland and Scottish Railway. From 1914, the line had been in competition with a tramcar service opened by the Nottinghamshire and Derbyshire Tramways Company. A Sentinel Steam Railcar was introduced in 1925 to reduce costs. However, the line finally closed to passengers with the General Strike the following year.

Preceding station	Historical railways	Following station
Terminus; Line closed, station closed	Midland Railway; Langley Mill branch line	Heanor; Line closed, station closed

== See also ==
- Langley Mill railway station
