= Ilkeston Corporation Tramways =

Operator of electric tram services

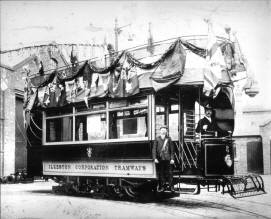
- The first tram car on the first day

Operation
- Locale: Ilkeston
- Open: 16 May 1903
- Close: 8 January 1931
- Status: Closed

Infrastructure
- Track gauge: 3 ft 6 in (1,067 mm)
- Propulsion system: Electric
- Depots: Park Road, Ilkeston

Statistics
- Route length: 4.25 miles (6.84 km)

Ilkeston Corporation Tramways was a tramway network in Ilkeston, Derbyshire, in the East Midlands of England run firstly by Ilkeston Borough Council and from 1916 by the Nottinghamshire and Derbyshire Tramways Company. The system ran between 1903 and 1931. Ilkeston was the first town in Derbyshire to adopt and operate a fully electrical tramway system.

== History ==
Ilkeston was the first Derbyshire town served by an electric tramway.

The proposal to build the first electric tramway was made by a firm called Derbyshire Brothers to Ilkeston Town Council who approved the idea in 1897. The Ilkeston Corporation Tramways Order 1899 was passed to allow the construction to proceed although by this time the council had decided to undertake the work with Derbyshire Brothers as advisors and contractors.

The line was 3¾ miles long and consisted of a single-line from Cotmanhay to Hallam Fields Road, along Cotmanhay Road to the town centre, where it served both the Great Northern Railway's Heanor Road station and the Midland Railway's Ilkeston Town station, and then Granby Street, Bath Street, South Street, Nottingham Road to Hallam Fields. A short ½ mile branch line along Station Road served the Ilkeston Junction railway station. The track was 3' 6" gauge.

The first tram tried out the track on 1 May 1903. The first accident occurred on three days later, before the system was opened to the public. A tram was travelling down South street and collided with a horse and fish barrow belonging to Buckall and King. The horse and barrow were knocked over.

The first public tram ran on 16 May 1903. In 1903 tram stops and fares were fixed (1d anywhere, except Station Road to Bath street which was 1/2d.) An illuminated tram was in use for Christmas 1909 and again at the celebrations for the coronation of King George V in 1911.

There were 13 trams in the fleet, originally painted in the Borough colours of maroon and cream, but after the council sold the network they were gradually repainted in green and cream. The depot was on Park Road at SK 4674 4146. The cost of building the network was estimated at over £80000 (equivalent to £8,410,200 in 2025).

Although the opening figures were good, revenues from the service soon began to drop and before long the tramway was running at a loss. The council looked for a buyer and the tramway was bought by Nottinghamshire and Derbyshire Tramways Company in 1916 for £28,150 (equivalent to £2,117,100 in 2025). Tram services ceased in 1931 and the service was replaced by trolleybuses, (referred to locally as 'tracklesses') and by motor buses. The tram track was removed over the next few months, with the final section in Station Road during February 1932.

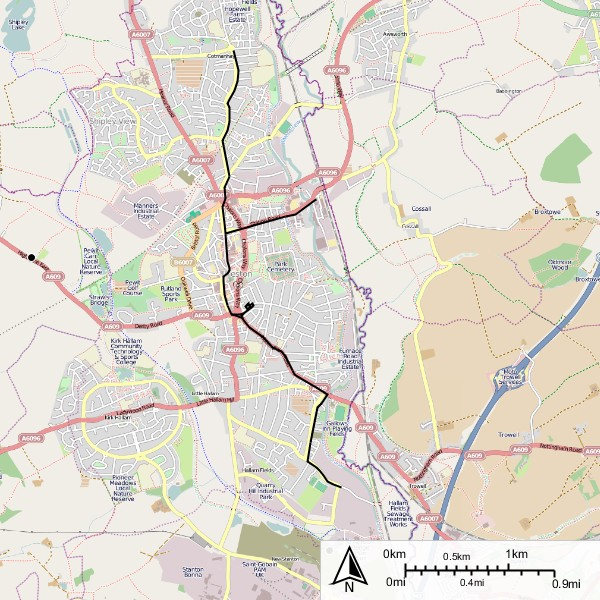
Map of Ilkeston Corporation Tramways
