= Long Eaton railway station (1847–1863) =

Former railway station in Derbyshire, England

Long Eaton
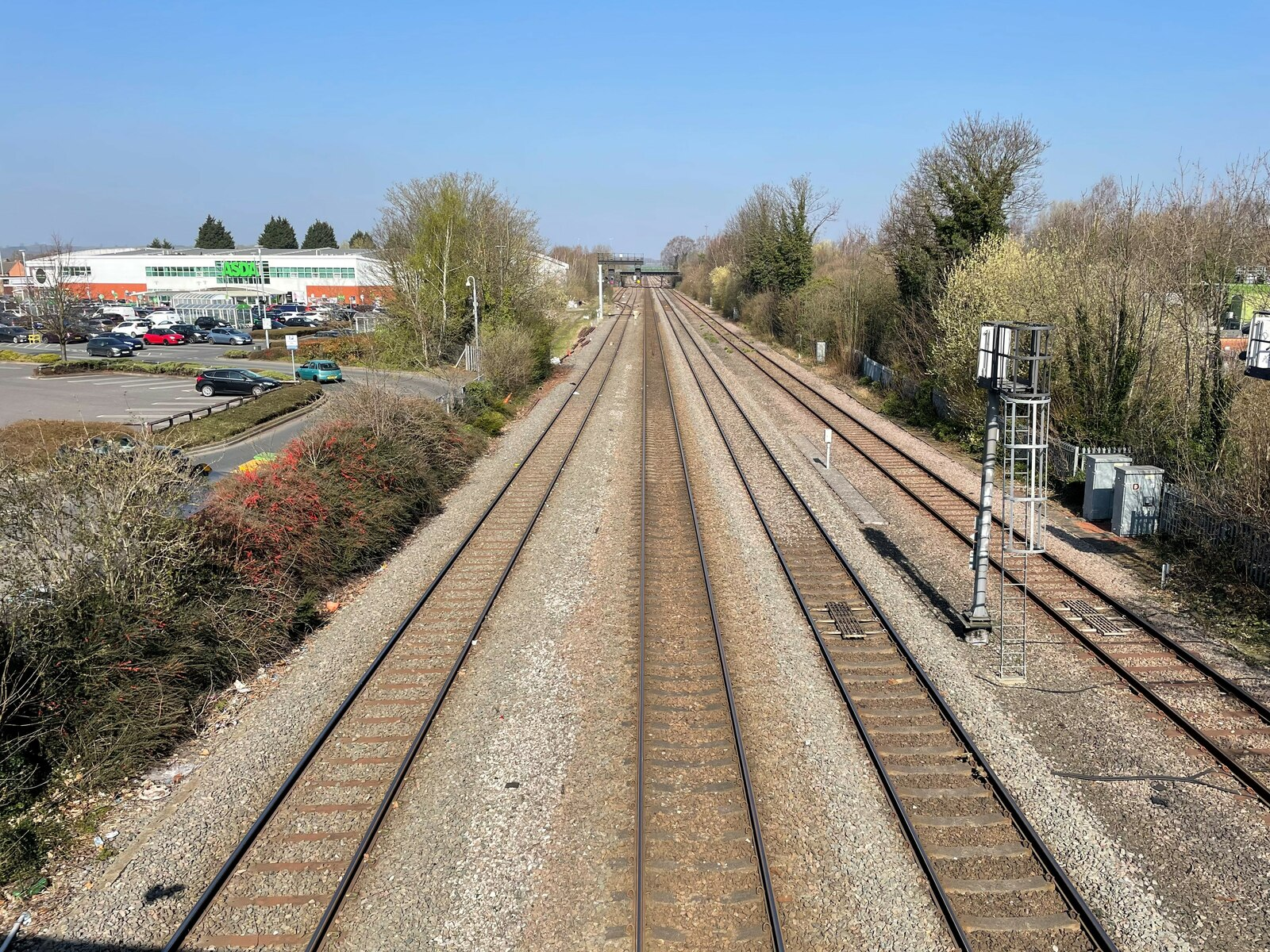
- Part of the Long Eaton railroad.

General information
- Location: Long Eaton, Erewash; England
- Coordinates: 52.900543°N 1.268449°W

Other information
- Status: Disused

History
- Original company: Midland Railway
- Pre-grouping: Midland Railway

Key dates
- 6 September 1847: Station opened as Long Eaton
- 1 October 1851: Renamed Toton for Long Eaton
- 1 June 1863: Last passenger service departed
Location

This Long Eaton railway station was built in 1847 for the Midland Railway.

== History ==
Situated on Nottingham Road, it opened in 1847 on the Erewash Valley Line. The station built by the Midland Counties Railway known as Long Eaton and opened in 1839 was renamed Long Eaton Junction.

It closed for passengers on 1 June 1863 when a new Long Eaton station opened on Station Road, but appears to have remained open for goods traffic for a few years afterwards.

== Stationmasters ==
- John Chappell ca. 1851
- Alfred William Button ca. 1857
- Michael Pullan ca. 1861 – 1863 (afterwards station master at the new Long Eaton station)
- William H. Newton 1863–1864 (afterwards station master at the new Long Eaton station)
- Michael Pullan 1864 (transferred to Goods Dept)
- H. Milner 1864 - ca. 1867

Preceding station	Historical railways	Following station
Stapleford and Sandiacre; Line open, station closed	Midland Railway; Erewash Valley Line	Long Eaton Junction; Line open, station closed

== See also ==
- Long Eaton railway station (Midland Counties Railway)
- Long Eaton railway station
