= Crosshill and Codnor railway station =

Former railway station in Derbyshire, England

Coordinates: 53.0356°N 1.3764°W

Crosshill and Codnor

General information
- Location: Crosshill and Codnor, Amber Valley; England

Other information
- Status: Disused

History
- Pre-grouping: Midland Railway
- Post-grouping: London Midland and Scottish Railway

Key dates
- 2 June 1890: Station opens
- 1 January 1917: closed
- 3 May 1920: reopened
- 4 May 1926: Station closes
Location

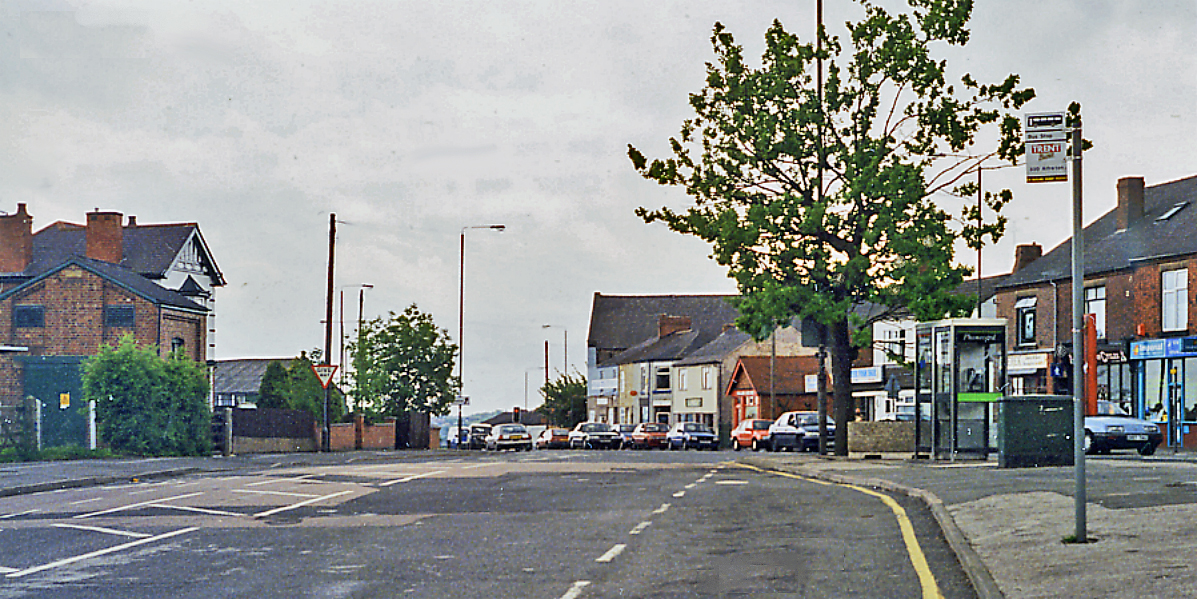
Site of Crosshill & Codnor station.

Crosshill and Codnor railway station was a railway station which served the villages of Crosshill and Codnor in Derbyshire, England It was opened in 1890 by the Midland Railway on its branch between Langley Mill on the Erewash Valley Line and Ripley

== History ==
The line came into being as competition for the GNR's branch. It was completed as far as Heanor by 1890, but took another five years to reach Langley Mill .

The station was built at line level next an overbridge carrying the Ripley to Heanor road. It was reached by a short driveway and a flight of wooden steps. There was only one platform. There were no goods facilities. The station was located on Station Lane just down from St James' Church.

Initially there were four trains each way between Heanor and Ripley and Butterley, with five on Saturday, but no Sunday service. When the line opened to Langley Mill this increased to nine each way.

Having been built for colliery traffic and passengers were an incidental, so only a shuttle was considered necessary. However, some trains ran between Nottingham and Ambergate or Chesterfield. One particularly complex service ran from Nottingham through Basford and Kimberley to Ilkeston Town, then via Langley Mill to Ripley and Butterley to Chesterfield.

Services ended during the First World War, but the line reopened in 1920. In the Grouping of all lines into four main companies in 1923 the station became part of the London, Midland and Scottish Railway . From 1914 the line had been in competition with the Ripley Rattlers a tramcar service opened by the Nottinghamshire and Derbyshire Tramways Company. To reduce costs a Sentinel Steam Railcar was introduced in 1925, but the line finally closed to passengers with the General Strike the following year.

By 1928 rails had been lifted to the south of the station and at the end of December 1929 the decision was taken to remove all track between Ripley and Heanor. The station buildings were used for various purposes until 1972 when they were demolished. The road had been straightened and the bridge filled in during 1955.

Preceding station	Historical railways	Following station
Heanor; Line closed, station closed	Midland Railway; Ripley to Erewash Valley Branch	Ripley; Line closed, station closed
