= Ripley railway station =

Former railway station in Derbyshire, England

Ripley
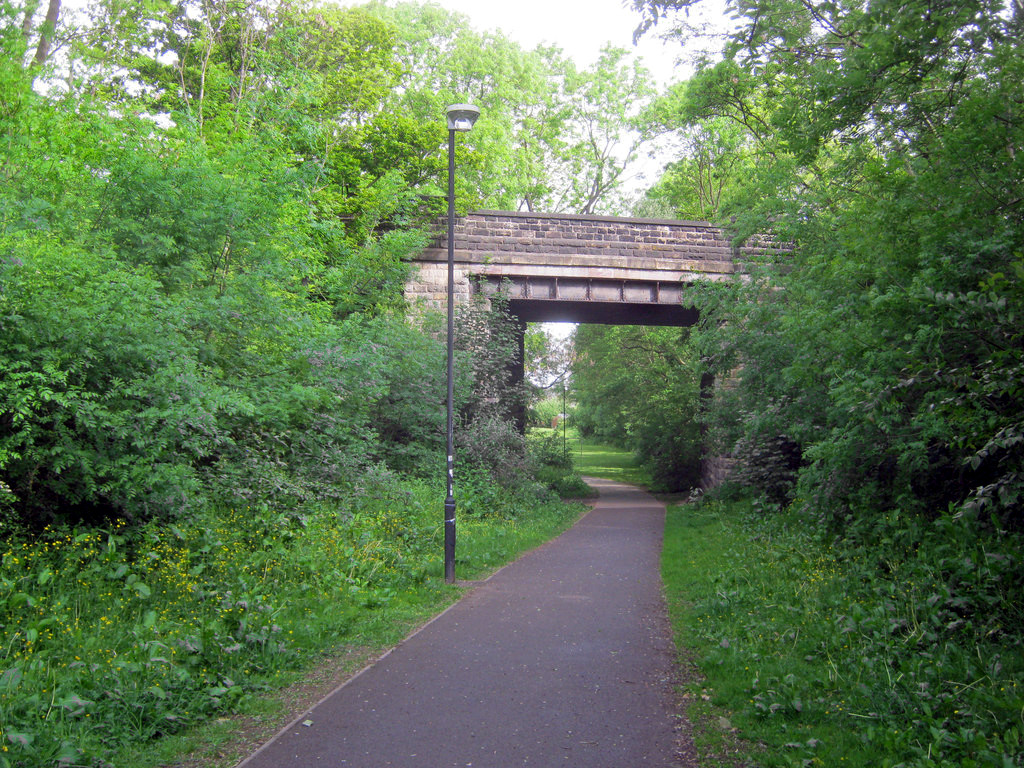
- Rail trail through the station site, to the south of Nottingham Road (2011)

General information
- Location: Ripley, Amber Valley, England
- Coordinates: 53.0502°N 1.4014°W
- Platforms: 2

Other information
- Status: Disused

History
- Original company: Midland Railway
- Pre-grouping: Midland Railway
- Post-grouping: London Midland and Scottish Railway

Key dates
- 1 September 1856: Station opened
- 2 September 1889: Replaced by new station
- 1 June 1930: Station closed to regular traffic for passengers
- 1 April 1963: Station closed for goods
Location

Ripley railway station served the town of Ripley, in Derbyshire, England, between 1856 and 1963.

== History ==
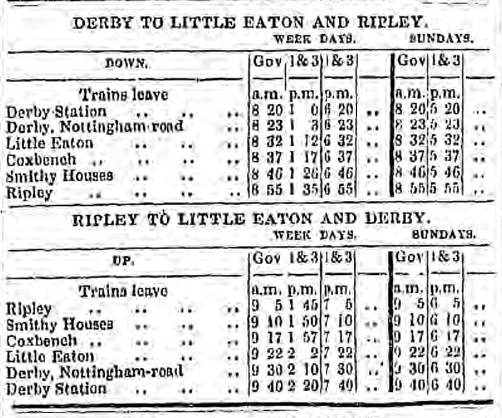
Timetable from the Derby Mercury (22 October 1856)

The station was opened in 1856 by the Midland Railway on its Ripley branch from Little Eaton Junction, approximately 3 miles (4.8 km) north of Derby. In 1890, it became the terminus of a line from Heanor Junction on the Erewash Valley Line, near Langley Mill.

Approximately 2.5 miles (4.0 km) from Denby, the line crossed the main Ripley Road at Marehay and reached the original station immediately to the south of Peasehill Road, around 0.6 miles (1 km) south of the town centre.

In 1889, a new line was built from Langley Mill through Heanor and Crosshill. A new station was built nearer to the town centre, since it was planned to extend the line to meet the Ambergate to Pye Bridge Line at Butterley. The original station became known as the Old Yard and provided goods facilities.

The new station, to the south of Nottingham Road and in a deep cutting, was double tracked with two platforms provided with matching single storey buildings.

In the Grouping of all railway companies into the Big Four in 1923, the station became part of the London, Midland and Scottish Railway. The station closed to passengers in 1930, though it continued with a very lively goods trade for the town's shops and businesses.

There were also regular excursions, for instance to the FA Cup Final organised by the Miners' Welfare, and the annual week at the holiday camp at Skegness, taken by over a thousand miners and their families. On 12 October 1961, the station featured on the ITV programme Lunchbox. Midland Railway Number 1000 brought 500 spectators from Derby.

The line north of Ripley to Butterley had closed on 23 January 1938; the section north from Marehay Junction closed in 1954, along with the Old Yard. The station finally closed to goods on 1 April 1963.

The station buildings were demolished in around 1985.

| Preceding station | Historical railways | Following station |
|---|---|---|
| Denby; Line closed, station closed | Midland Railway; Ripley Branch | Butterley; Line closed, station open |
| Crosshill and Codnor; Line closed, station closed | Midland Railway; Ripley to Erewash Valley Branch | Butterley; Line closed, station open |

== Station masters ==
- William Rich until 1861
- W. Bevers 1861 - 1863
- J. Ashton from 1863
- Joseph Hudson ca. 1869 - 1874
- G. Tamblin 1874 - 1879
- William Grundy 1879 - 1884
- E.R. Brown 1884 - 1893
- H. King 1893 - 1894
- William F. Foster 1894 - 1924
- Harry Finch 1924 - 1931 (later station master at Wigston)
- Richard Pratt 1931 - ca. 1945 (formerly station master at Whitwell)
- Mr. Knight ca. 1956.

== The site today ==
Part of the site is now occupied by a builders merchant's warehouse. The trackbed was converted to a rail trail, the Ripley Greenway, which passes through the station site.
