= Hallam station =

Hallam station may refer to:

- Hallam railway station, Hallam, Melbourne, Victoria, Australia
- Hallam FM (radio station), Sheffield, South Yorkshire, England, UK
- Hallam Nuclear Power Facility (nuclear power station), Nebraska, USA

== See also ==
- West Hallam railway station, West Hallam, Derbyshire, England, UK
- Hallam (disambiguation)
