= Long Eaton railway station (1863–1967) =

Former railway station in Derbyshire, England

Long Eaton
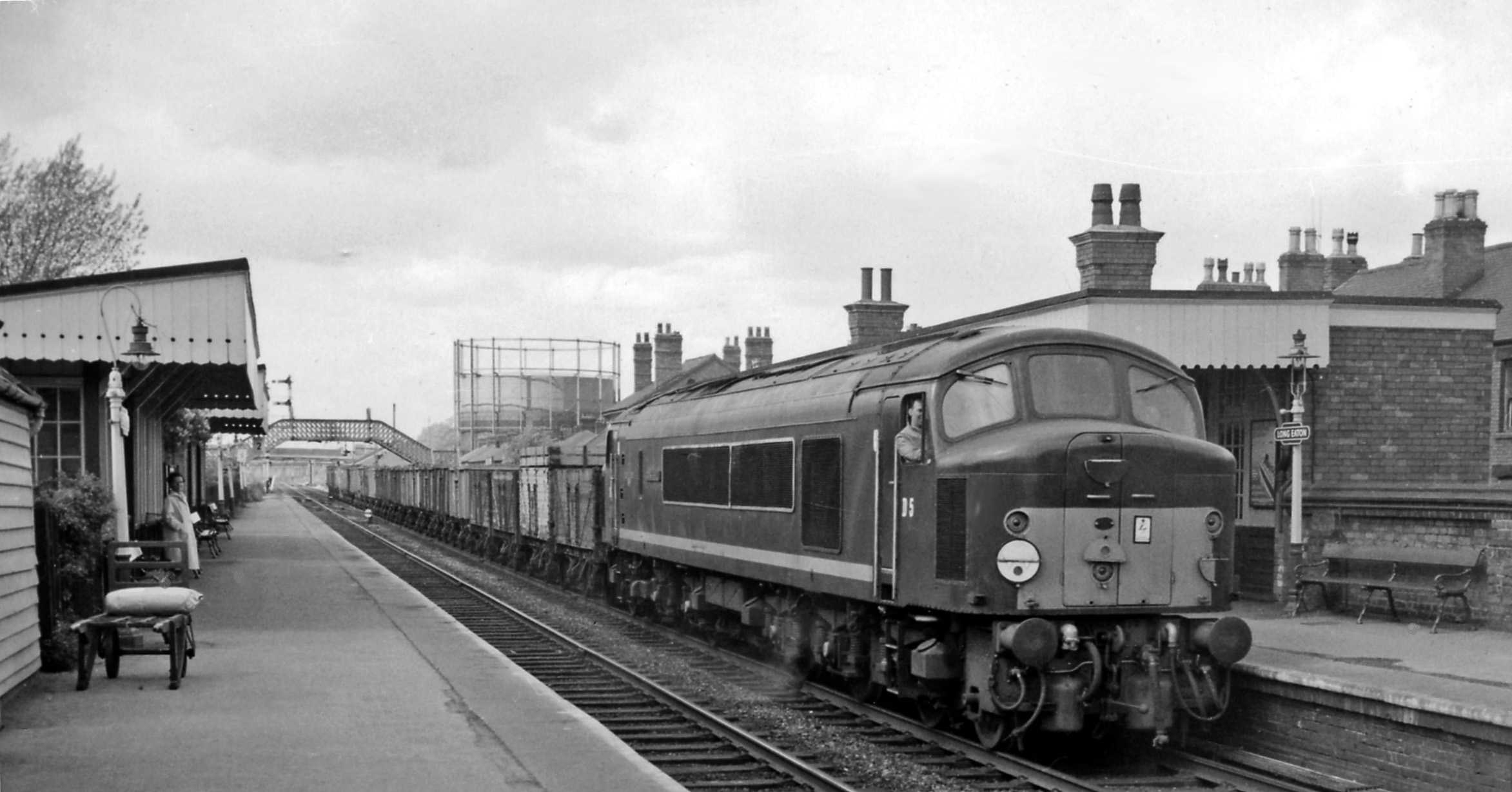
- Diesel-hauled empties passing the former Long Eaton Station in 1962

General information
- Location: Long Eaton, Erewash; England
- Coordinates: 52.896299°N 1.265412°W

Other information
- Status: Disused

History
- Original company: Midland Railway
- Pre-grouping: Midland Railway
- Post-grouping: London, Midland and Scottish Railway

Key dates
- 1 June 1863: Station opened
- 31 December 1966: Last passenger service departed
- 2 January 1967: Station closed
- 6 May 1968: Name taken by Sawley Junction
Location

This Long Eaton railway station was built in 1863 for the Midland Railway.

== History ==
Situated on Station Road, it opened on 1 June 1863 and replaced an earlier station in Long Eaton of 1847 which by that time was known as Toton which was on Nottingham Road on the Erewash Valley Line.

The last train ran on 31 December 1966. On Monday 2 January 1967, C.G. Browne, chief librarian and curator at Long Eaton purchased two tickets for the local history collection at the library. These tickets were the last to be issued at the station even though there was no train service they could be used on.

This station closed on 2 January 1967 and Sawley Junction was then renamed Long Eaton.

Preceding station	Historical railways	Following station
Stapleford and Sandiacre; Line open, station closed	Midland Railway; Erewash Valley Line	Trent; Line open, station closed
Stapleford and Sandiacre; Line open, station closed	Midland Railway; Erewash Valley Line	Attenborough; Line open, station open

== Stationmasters ==
- Michael Pullan 1863–1864 (formerly station master at Toton, afterwards station master at Toton)
- William H. Newton 1864–1873 (formerly station master at Toton)
- John Dicken 1873–1881 (formerly station master at Sandal and Walton, afterwards station master at Beauchief)
- George Hull 1881–1886 (formerly station master at Grimston, afterwards station master at Guiseley)
- John Henry Bodsworth 1886–1896 (formerly station master at Castle Donington)
- Andrew John Evans 1896–1908
- John Davies 1908–1926
- Herbert Hayward 1926–1932 (formerly station master at Pelsall, afterwards station master at Dudley)
- E.J. Clulow 1932–1940 (formerly station master at Dronfield)
- B.W. Barker 1940–1946 (formerly station master at Spondon)
- W.H. Clarke 1946–1949
- Harold John Roden 1949–1954
- F. Rimmer until 1957
- W. Longland 1957 – ca. 1964 (formerly station master at Wolverton)

== See also ==
- Long Eaton railway station (Midland Counties Railway)
- Long Eaton railway station
