= Shipley Gate railway station =

Former railway station in Derbyshire, England

Shipley Gate
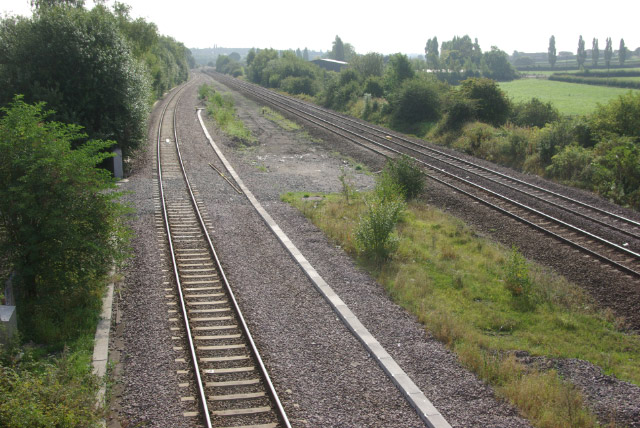
- The site of the station in 2007

General information
- Location: Shipley, Amber Valley; England
- Coordinates: 53.0022°N 1.3139°W
- Grid reference: SK461452
- Platforms: 2

Other information
- Status: Disused

History
- Original company: Midland Railway
- Pre-grouping: Midland Railway
- Post-grouping: London, Midland and Scottish Railway

Key dates
- 1 July 1851: Station opened
- 27 August 1948: Station closed
Location

Shipley Gate railway station served the village of Shipley, Derbyshire, England from 1851 to 1948 on the Erewash Valley Line.

== History ==
The station opened on 1 July 1851 by the Midland Railway. It closed to passengers on 27 August 1948.

Preceding station	Historical railways	Following station
Langley Mill; Line and station open	Midland Railway; Erewash Valley Line	Ilkeston Junction and Cossall; Line open, station closed
