= Stanton Gate railway station =

Former railway station in Derbyshire, England

Stanton Gate
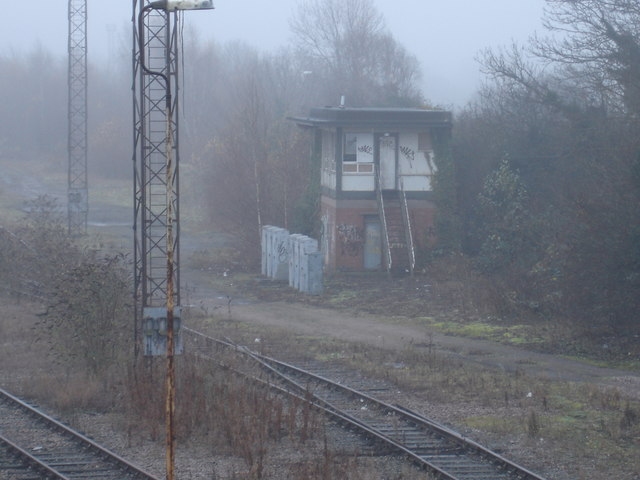
- The now disused signal box near the site of the station in 2008

General information
- Location: Stanton Gate, Derbyshire; England
- Coordinates: 52.9399°N 1.2816°W
- Grid reference: SK483383
- Platforms: 3

Other information
- Status: Disused

History
- Original company: Midland Railway
- Pre-grouping: Midland Railway
- Post-grouping: London, Midland and Scottish Railway

Key dates
- July 1851: Opened
- 2 January 1967: Closed
Location

Stanton Gate railway station served the village of Stanton Gate, Derbyshire, England from 1851 to 1967 on the Erewash Valley Line.

== History ==
The station opened in July 1851 by the Midland Railway. It closed to both passengers and goods traffic on 2 January 1967.

== Rail accident ==
On 6 December 1963 at 01:32 the previous evening's 22:40 Leeds-Leicester freight train hauled by Type 4 diesel locomotive No. D94 travelling at about 45mph passed at least two stop signals and collided diagonally with the 01:00 Toton-Woodhouse Mill goods train which was crossing under clear signals from the No.1 Down goods line across the up and down main lines to the No.2 down goods line. The front end of D94 on the Leeds train was almost totally destroyed, causing the deaths of the driver and his second man.

== Man in a sleeping bag ==
Found beside Stanton Railway Station on 14 July 1996, this man’s identity remains unknown nearly three decades later. Thought to be in his 40s or 50s, he was thin, about 5ft 6ins tall with dark brown collar-length hair turning grey. He had an old duvet and quilt along with his sleeping bag.

Preceding station	Historical railways	Following station
Trowell; Line open, station closed	Midland Railway; Erewash Valley Line	Stapleford and Sandiacre; Line open, station closed
