= Trowell railway station =

Former railway station in Nottinghamshire, England

Trowell
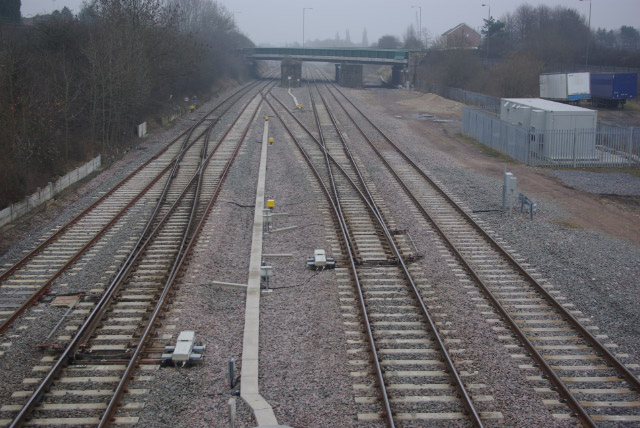
- The site of the station in 2009

General information
- Location: Trowell, Nottinghamshire; England
- Coordinates: 52.9582°N 1.2885°W
- Grid reference: SK479402
- Platforms: 3

Other information
- Status: Disused

History
- Original company: Midland Railway
- Pre-grouping: Midland Railway
- Post-grouping: London, Midland and Scottish Railway

Key dates
- 2 June 1884: Opened
- 2 January 1967: Closed
Location

Trowell railway station served the village of Trowell, Nottinghamshire, England from 1884 to 1967 on the Erewash Valley Line.

== History ==
The station opened on 2 June 1884 by the Midland Railway. The booking hall was positioned on the bridge on the main road between Ilkeston and Nottingham.

On 16 November 1938 Ernest Lawler broke into the station and stole the safe. He was imprisoned for 6 months.

It closed to both passengers and goods traffic on 2 January 1967.

== Stationmasters ==
- George Smith 1884 (temporary)
- John Norton 1884 - 1916 (formerly stationmaster at Water Orton)
- Arthur Billington ???? - 1936
- Harold Doxey 1936 - 1943 (afterwards stationmaster at Great Barr)
- S Barratt 1943 - ????
- Neville J. Berry 1961 - ????

Preceding station	Historical railways	Following station
Ilkeston Junction	Midland Railway; Erewash Valley Line	Stanton Gate
Terminus	Midland Railway; Radford to Trowell line	Radford; Line open, station closed
