= Alfreton railway station =

Railway station in Derbyshire, England

Coordinates: 53.100°N 1.370°W

Alfreton
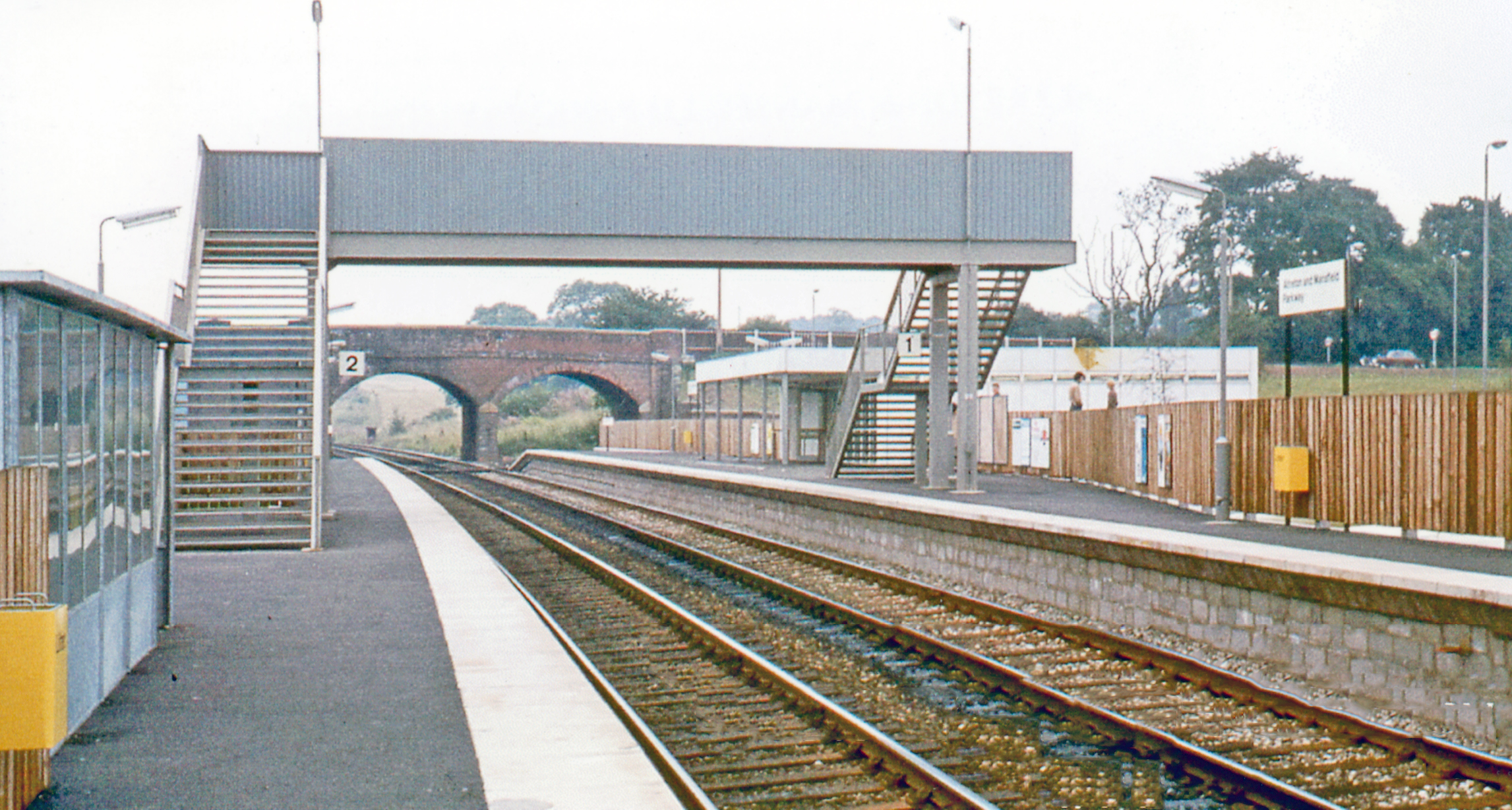
- The railway station as opened in 1973

General information
- Location: Alfreton, Amber Valley; England
- Grid reference: SK422561
- Manager: East Midlands Railway
- Platforms: 2

Other information
- Station code: ALF
- Classification: DfT category E

Key dates
- 1 May 1862: Opened as Alfreton
- 7 November 1891: Renamed Alfreton and South Normanton
- 2 January 1967: Closed
- 7 May 1973: Reopened as Alfreton and Mansfield Parkway
- 1995: Renamed Alfreton

Passengers
- 2020/21: ▼61,690
- 2021/22: ▲0.246 million
- 2022/23: ▲0.290 million
- 2023/24: ▲0.316 million
- 2024/25: ▲0.383 million
Location
Notes
- Passenger statistics from the Office of Rail and Road

Alfreton railway station serves the town and civil parish of Alfreton in the Amber Valley district of Derbyshire, England. The station is on the Erewash Valley line 18 1/4 miles (29.4 km) north of Nottingham and 9 3/4 miles (15.7 km) south of Chesterfield.

Alfreton is a penalty fare station when travelling on East Midlands Railway services.

== History ==
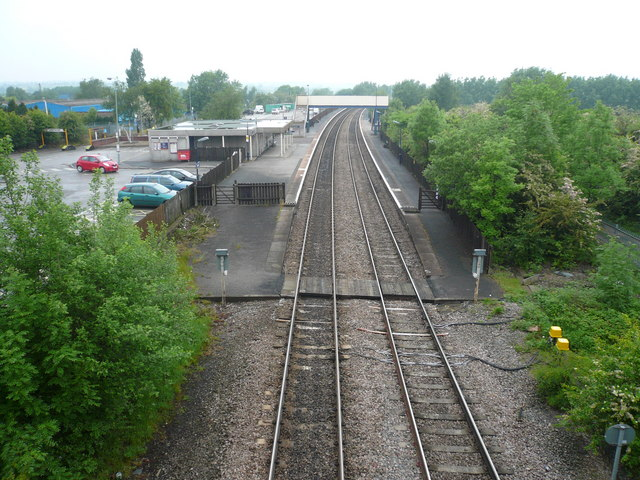
The railway station in 2008

Opened by the Midland Railway (MR) as Alfreton on 1 May 1862, the station was renamed Alfreton and South Normanton on 7 November 1891. It became part of the London, Midland and Scottish Railway (LMS) during the Grouping of 1923. The line then passed on to the London Midland Region of British Railways (LMR) on nationalisation in 1948. The British Railways Board (BRB) closed the station to passengers on 2 January 1967, due to the Beeching cuts, and the buildings and platforms were subsequently demolished.

When the station reopened on 7 May 1973, it was given the name Alfreton and Mansfield Parkway, as the nearby town of Mansfield in Nottinghamshire did not have a passenger service of its own, making it at the time one of the largest towns in Britain without such a service. Following the reopening of the Robin Hood Line in 1995, Mansfield station re-opened, so Alfreton station reverted to its original name.

When Sectorisation was introduced in the 1980s, the station was served by the Intercity Sector and Provincial, which became Regional Railways until the privatisation of British Railways.

== Facilities ==
The station is staffed through the day, with the ticket office open 06:45 – 18:00 Mondays – Saturdays and 10:30 – 18:00 Sundays. A ticket machine is provided in the main building for use outside these times and for collecting pre-paid tickets. Toilets are located on platform 1, whilst platform 2 (southbound) has a waiting shelter only. Train running information is provided by digital CIS screens, automatic announcements, timetable posters and a customer help point on platform 1.

Until June 2025, step-free access was only available for platform 1, as the barrow crossing at the station has been closed and the footbridge linking the platforms has stairs. People who could not use the footbridge (e.g. wheelchair users) were required to make a rail journey to the stations at Nottingham or Chesterfield, and back, to cross platforms using lifts at these stations.

It was realised that this provision was inadequate, and several proposals have called for the installation of lifts at the station. None of these were successful until 2024, when a £6.75 million upgrade to the station was approved. Work started in February of that year, and was completed in June 2025. The work saw the installation of two lifts at each side of the station, the replacement of the over 50 year old footbridge, and an accessibility ramp on the side.

== Services ==
There is generally an hourly East Midlands Railway Local service northbound to Liverpool Lime Street via Sheffield and southbound to Norwich via Nottingham.

Northern Trains run an hourly service between Nottingham and Leeds that stops at Alfreton. This service started from the December 2008 timetable change. From 2 April 2017, southbound services began to stop at the newly opened station at Ilkeston.

Preceding station	National Rail	Following station
Nottingham	East Midlands Railway Liverpool–Norwich	Chesterfield
Langley Mill Limited Service	East Midlands Railway Liverpool–Norwich	Chesterfield
Langley Mill	Northern Trains Nottingham–Leeds	Chesterfield
