= Marlpool railway station =

Former railway station in Derbyshire, England

Coordinates: 53.0000°N 1.3422°W

Marlpool
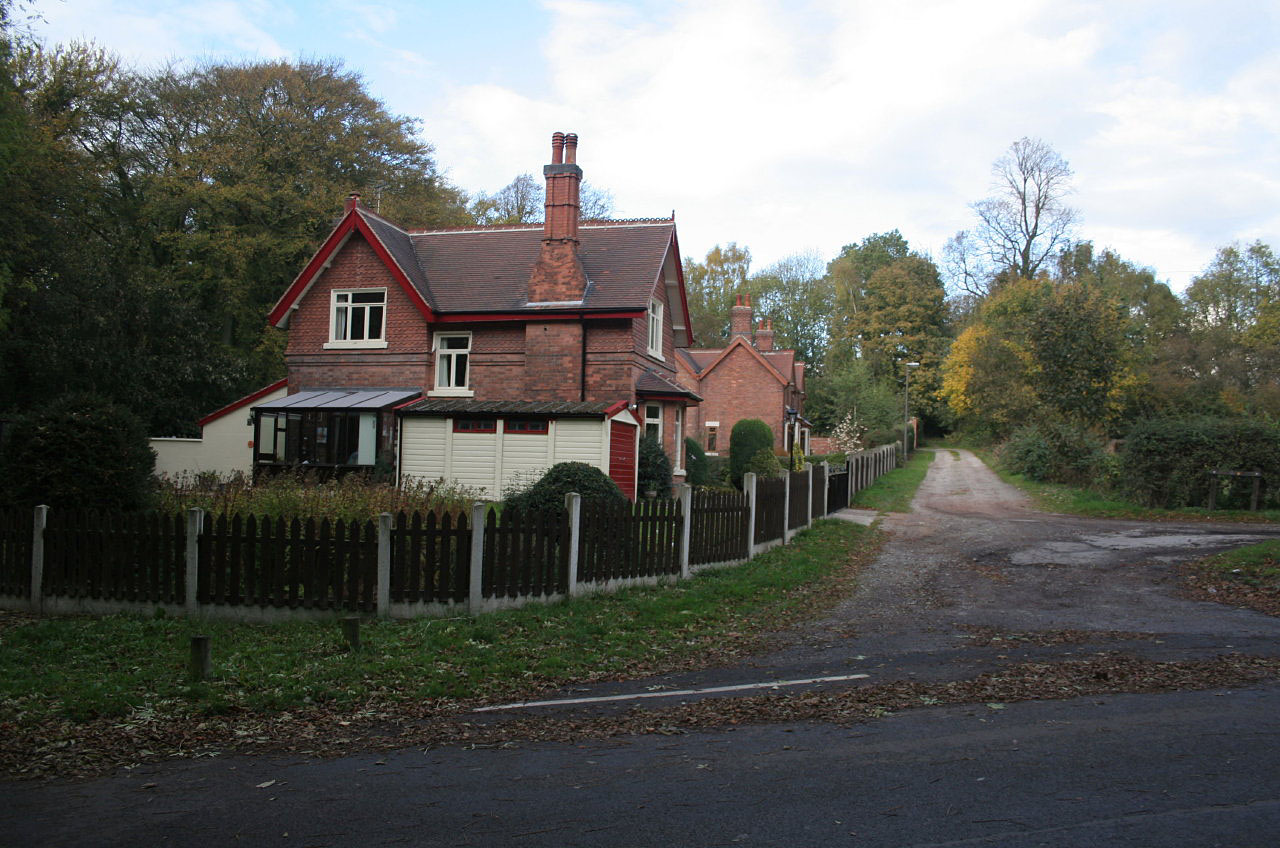
- Station house and access road in 2011

General information
- Location: Marlpool, Amber Valley; England

Other information
- Status: Disused

History
- Original company: Great Northern Railway
- Pre-grouping: Great Northern Railway
- Post-grouping: London and North Eastern Railway

Key dates
- 1 July 1891: Station opens
- 30 April 1928: Station closes
Location

Marlpool railway station is a former railway station that served the village of Marlpool in Derbyshire, England. It was opened on a branch line from Ilkeston to Heanor on the Great Northern Railway (Great Britain) Derbyshire Extension line.

Opened in 1891, passenger services finished in 1928. Today, the station building is a private residence.

Friends of Marpool Station are a group established to preserve the station

Preceding station	Disused railways	Following station
Heanor	Heanor Branch Line; Great Northern Railway	Ilkeston North
