= Long Eaton railway station (Midland Counties Railway) =

Former railway station in Derbyshire, England

Long Eaton (MCR)
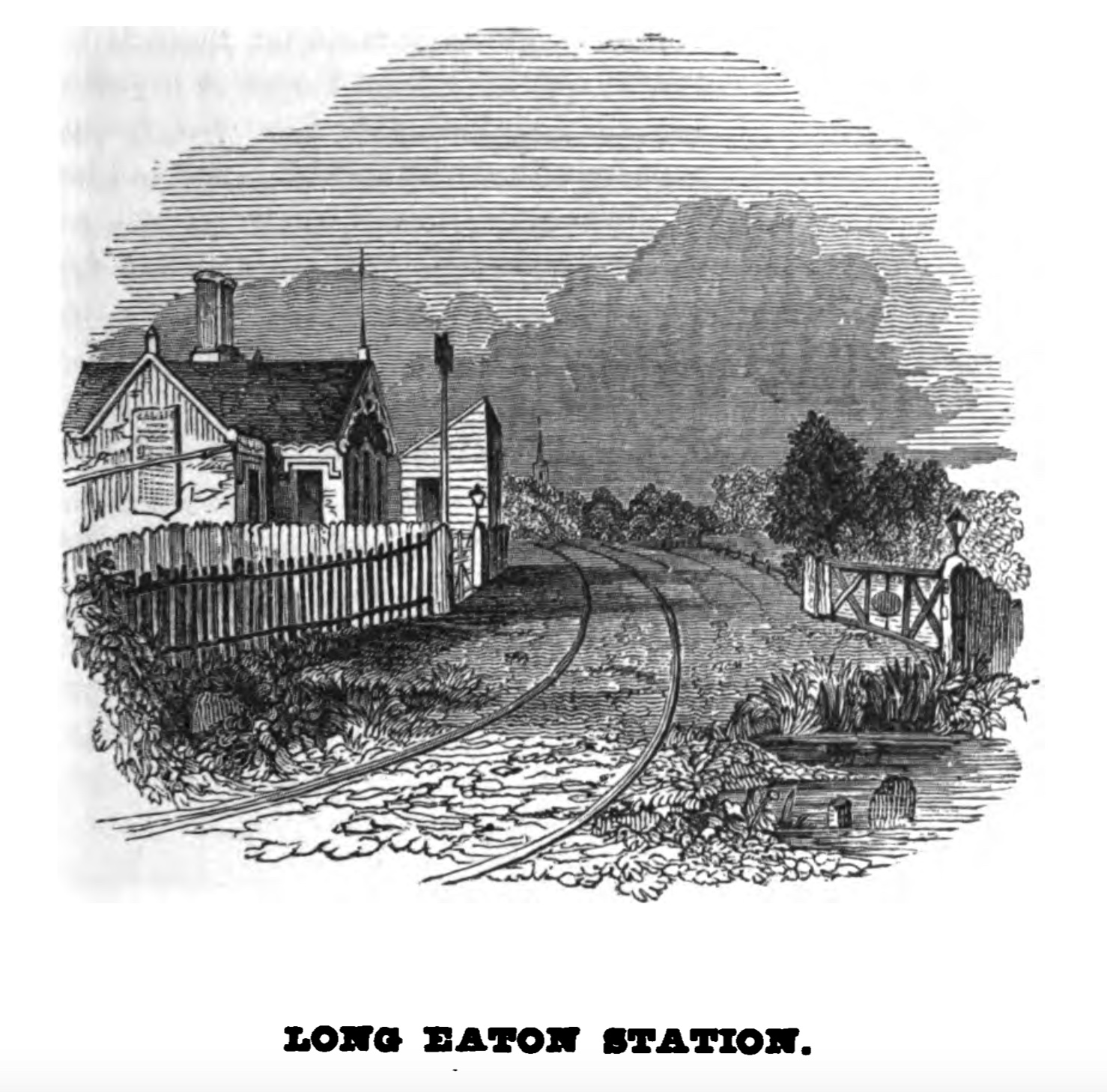
- Long Eaton railway station from the Midland Counties Railway Companion of 1840

General information
- Location: Long Eaton, Erewash; England
- Coordinates: 52.891°N 1.257°W

Other information
- Status: Disused

History
- Original company: Midland Counties Railway
- Pre-grouping: Midland Railway

Key dates
- 4 June 1839: Station opened
- 6 September 1847: Renamed Long Eaton Junction new Long Eaton station opened
- 1 October 1851: Second station renamed Toton for Long Eaton
- 1 May 1862: Toton for Long Eaton renamed Long Eaton; Long Eaton Junction closed
Location

The original Long Eaton railway station was built in 1839 for the Midland Counties Railway.

== History ==
Situated on Meadow Lane, it was the second station from Nottingham. After a few years the Midland Counties Railway joined the North Midland Railway and the Birmingham and Derby Junction Railway to form the Midland Railway.

In 1847, a new station was opened in Long Eaton on Nottingham Road on the newly built Erewash Valley Line. This new station was known as Long Eaton, so the MCR station was renamed Long Eaton Junction.

The MCR station was closed in 1862 when the junctions were realigned and Trent railway station was built.

== Stationmasters ==
- Mr. Tipper ca. 1844
- William Palmer ca. 1851 – 1862 (afterwards station master at Alfreton)

== See also ==
- Long Eaton railway station (Sawley Junction 1888–1932, Long Eaton 1932–present)
- Long Eaton railway station (1847–1863)
- Long Eaton railway station (1863–1967)
