= Breadsall railway station =

Former railway station in Derbyshire, England

Coordinates: 52.95101°N 1.45290°W

Breadsall
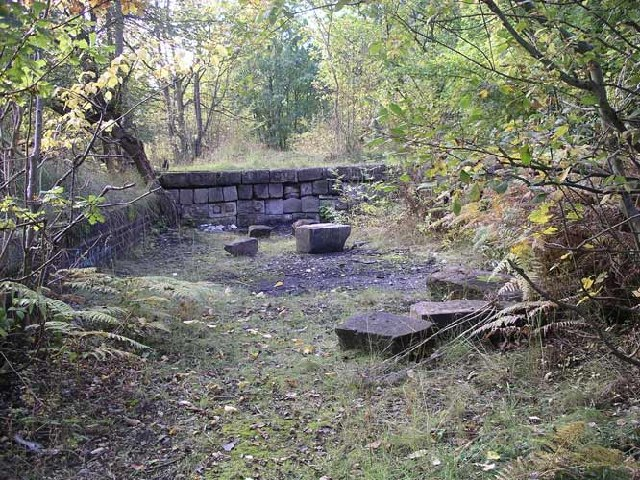
- Station remains in 2005

General information
- Location: Breadsall, Erewash; England
- Grid reference: SK368394
- Platforms: 2

Other information
- Status: Disused

History
- Original company: Great Northern Railway
- Post-grouping: London and North Eastern Railway; London Midland Region of British Railways

Key dates
- 1 April 1878: Opened
- 6 April 1953: Closed to passengers
- 3 December 1962: Goods facilities withdrawn
Location

Breadsall railway station was a former railway station in Breadsall, Derbyshire. It was opened by the Great Northern Railway (Great Britain) on its Derbyshire Extension in 1878.

== History ==
From West Hallam and the summit at Morley Tunnel, the line descended to Breadsall, on a gradient of 1 in 100.

The station itself was very close to the village and was provided with substantial brick buildings, including a two-storey station master's house and single storey offices on the platforms.

The passenger service at the station finished in 1953, while goods services ended in 1962. The line itself continued in use for passenger services until 1964, and for goods until 1968.

From Breadsall, the line crossed the Derwent valley by a long succession of embankments and viaducts. It then entered the town through a deep cutting before reaching Derby Friargate.

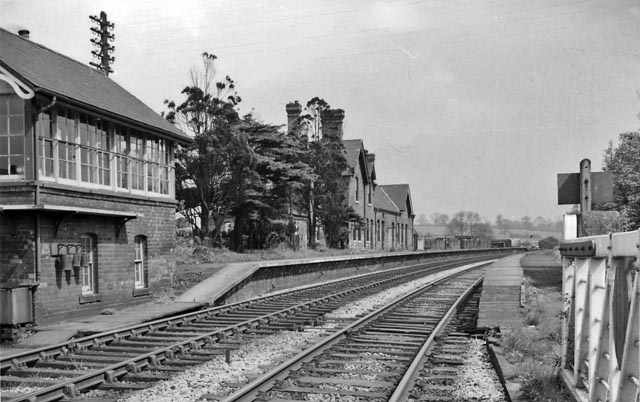
The station in 1961

Preceding station	Disused railways	Following station
West Hallam	London Midland Region of British Railways (Derby) Friargate Line	Derby Racecourse

== Present day ==
The platforms and their buildings were gradually demolished, although traces remain. The single storey buildings became unsafe and were pulled down. The stationmaster's house survived until 1978 in an increasingly decrepit state until it became unsafe following an arson attack and it too was demolished.

A length of the old trackbed has been opened up as the Great Northern Greenway bridlepath through Breadsall since 2009 and the site of the station is now more accessible.
