= Stapleford and Sandiacre railway station =

Former railway station in Derbyshire, England

Stapleford and Sandiacre
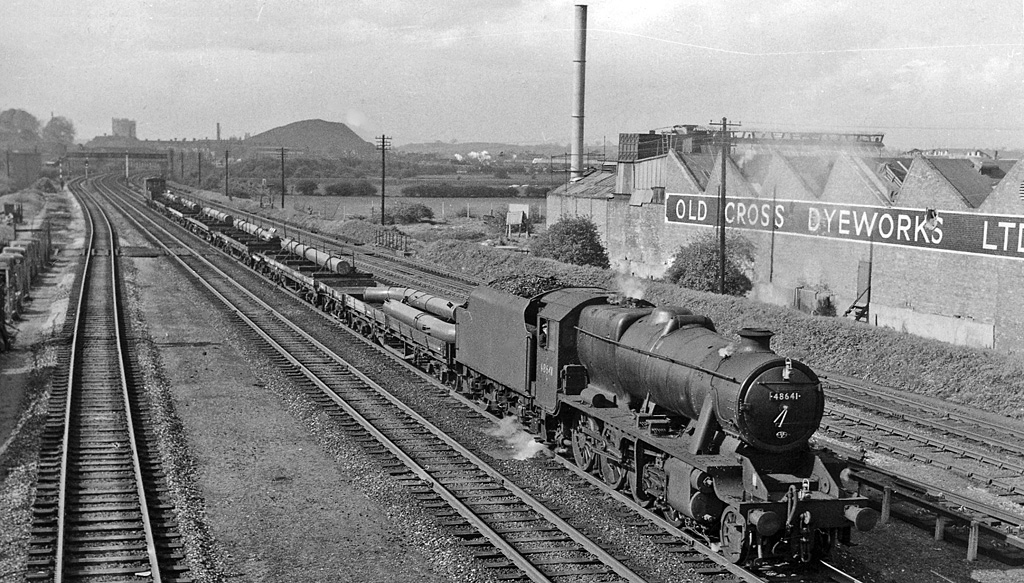
- A freight train on the up side in 1962

General information
- Location: Stapleford, Nottinghamshire, Sandiacre, Derbyshire; England
- Coordinates: 52.922°N 1.283°W
- Grid reference: SK483363
- Platforms: 3

Other information
- Status: Disused

History
- Original company: Midland Railway
- Pre-grouping: Midland Railway
- Post-grouping: London, Midland and Scottish Railway

Key dates
- 6 September 1847: First station opened as Sandiacre and Stapleford
- 1 May 1872: First station closed and second station opened
- 1884: Name changed to Stapleford and Sandiacre
- 2 January 1967: Second station closed
Location

Stapleford and Sandiacre railway station served the towns of Stapleford, Nottinghamshire and Sandiacre, Derbyshire, England from 1847 to 1967 on the Erewash Valley Line.

== History ==
The station opened as Sandiacre and Stapleford on 6 September 1847 by the Midland Railway. It closed on 1 May 1872 but a second station opened on the same day. The second station's name was changed to Stapleford and Sandiacre in 1884. It closed to both passengers and goods traffic on 2 January 1967.

== Stationmasters ==
- John Willoughby 1859 - 1865
- Edward Eagle 1865 - ca. 1866 (formerly station master at Croxall, afterwards station master at Langley Mill)
- Albert C. Bilham until 1872 (afterwards station master at Ilkeston)
- Samuel Hawkins Orchard 1872 - 1906 (formerly stationmaster at Upton on Severn)
- George Ward 1906 - 1911
- Alfred Marston 1911 - 1920 (afterwards stationmaster at Beeston)
- Charles James Waters 1920 - 1941
- S.H. Burditt 1941 - 1950 (formerly stationmaster at Selly Oak)
- Harold Anslow ca. 1958 ca. 1967

Preceding station	Historical railways	Following station
Stanton Gate; Line open, station closed	Midland Railway; Erewash Valley Line	Long Eaton (1863–1967); Line open, station closed
