= Halam =

Halam may refer to:

- Halam tribe, an ethnic group in India and Myanmar
- Halam, Nottinghamshire, a village in England
- The xalam, a traditional west-African lute, is sometimes spelled halam.
- people with the surname:
  - Ann Halam, a pen name of Gwyneth Jones (novelist)
  - Robert Hallam (died 1417), an English medieval bishop and university chancellor

== See also ==
- Hallam (disambiguation)
