= Newthorpe, Greasley and Shipley Gate railway station =

Former railway station in Nottinghamshire, England

Coordinates: 53.0067°N 1.3078°W

Newthorpe

General information
- Location: Broxtowe; England
- Platforms: 2

Other information
- Status: Disused

History
- Original company: Great Northern Railway
- Post-grouping: London and North Eastern Railway

Key dates
- 1 August 1876: Station opened as Newthorpe, Greasley and Shipley Gate
- circa 1910: renamed Newthorpe
- 7 January 1963: Station closes
Location

Newthorpe, Greasley and Shipley Gate railway station was a railway station which served the villages of Newthorpe, Greasley and Shipley Gate on the border of Derbyshire and Nottinghamshire. It was opened by the Great Northern Railway (Great Britain) on its Derbyshire Extension and closed in 1963.

The main, red brick buildings of the station were on the Up platform at the north side of the double track with access for passengers from Mill Lane. The Up and Down platforms were connected by a latticework footbridge. There was a signal box at the East end of the Down platform, which also accommodated a small waiting room.

There were brickworks served by railway sidings on both sides of the line directly to the East of the station. The Eastwood Brick and Pottery Company was to the North of the line and the Erewash Brick, Pipe and Pottery Company to the South. These later became amalgamated as the Manners Brick Company. Directly to the North of the station sidings served the Wilkins Wire Rope Company later known as the Birnam Products subsidiary of Tinsley Wire Industries which, as of 2009, is owned by Magna International, manufacturing car seats.

Directly to the West of the station a branch line left the railway on the south side of the track which once served the Eastwood Colliery. Both the branch line and the main line passed under a substantial three span bridge which carried Mill Lane (more recently known as Newmanleys Road) over the railway. When this colliery was closed the branch was used as a siding.

| Preceding station | Disused railways | Following station |
|---|---|---|
| Kimberley East | Great Northern Railway; GNR Derbyshire and Staffordshire Extension; Pinxton Branch | Eastwood and Langley Mill |
