= Hallam =

Hallam may refer to:

== Places ==
- Hallam, Victoria, Australia
  - Hallam railway station

=== UK ===
- Hallamshire, an area in South Yorkshire, England, UK
  - Royal Hallamshire Hospital
  - Sheffield Hallam (UK Parliament constituency)
  - Sheffield Hallam University
  - Hallam Tower, a high rise building in the Fulwood area of Sheffield
  - Roman Catholic Diocese of Hallam
- West Hallam in Derbyshire, England, UK
  - West Hallam railway station
- Hallam Street, Marylebone, London, England, UK

=== USA ===
- Hallam, Nebraska, United States
  - Hallam Nuclear Power Facility, a nuclear reactor
- Hallam, Pennsylvania, United States

== Other uses ==
- Hallam (surname)
- Reuben Hallam, author, who wrote in the Sheffield dialect
- Hallam F.C. - a non-league football club in Sheffield
- Hallam FM, former name of a radio station based in Sheffield, now called Hits Radio South Yorkshire

== See also ==
- Halam (disambiguation)
