= Eastwood and Langley Mill railway station =

Former railway station in Derbyshire, England

Coordinates: 53.0188°N 1.3208°W

Eastwood and Langley Mill

General information
- Location: Amber Valley; England
- Platforms: 2

Other information
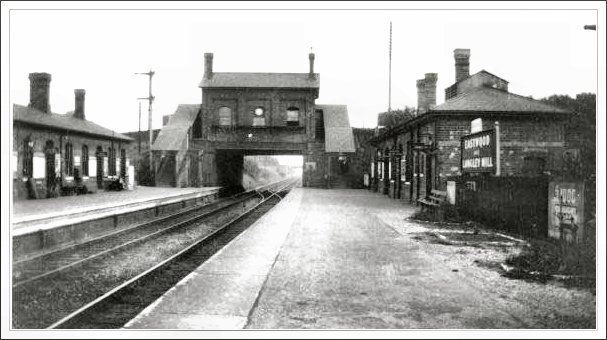
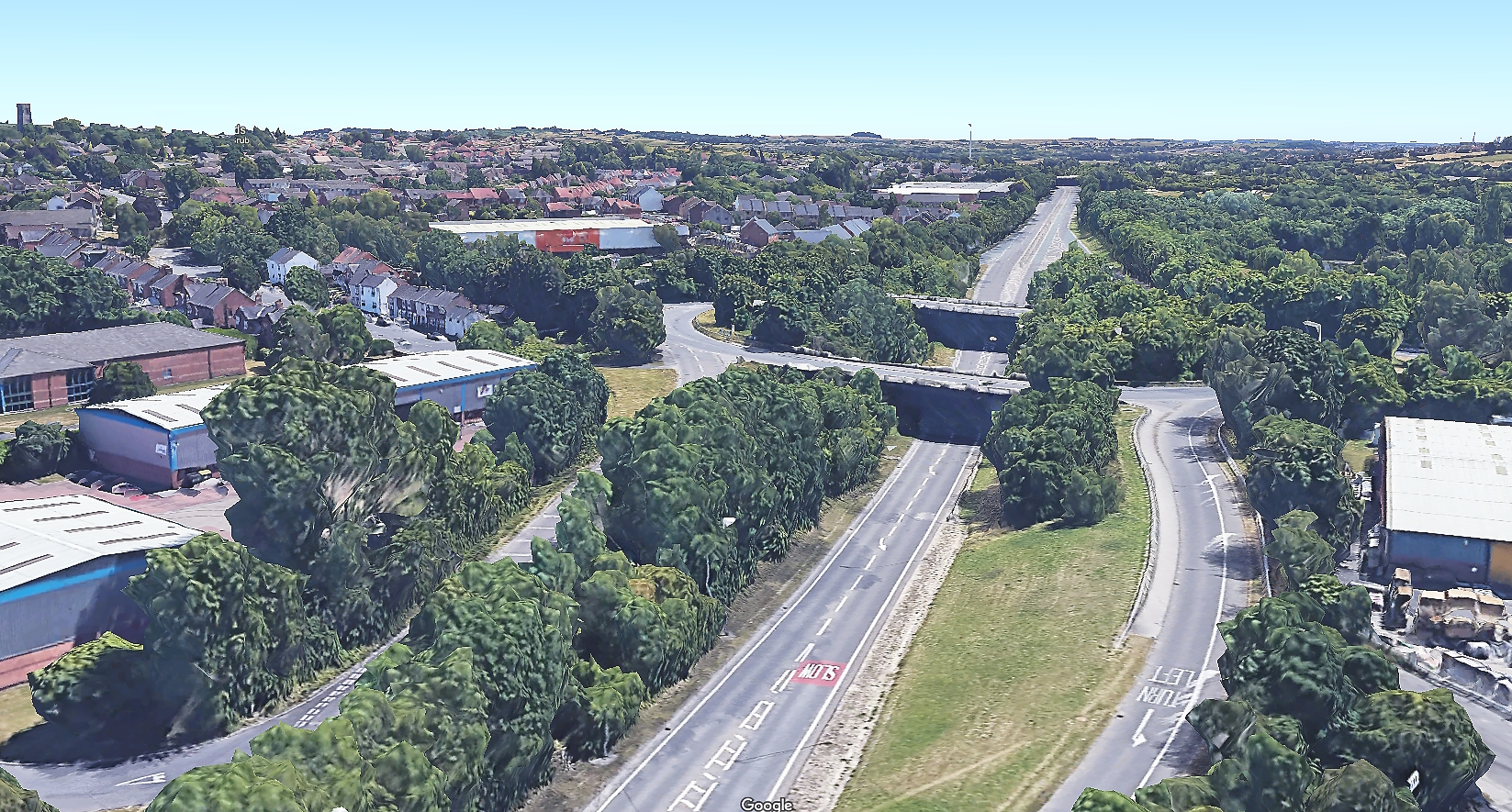
- Status: Disused

History
- Original company: Great Northern Railway
- Pre-grouping: Great Northern Railway
- Post-grouping: London and North Eastern Railway

Key dates
- 1 August 1876: Opened
- 7 January 1963: Closed
Location

Eastwood and Langley Mill railway station is a former railway station serving the town of Eastwood in Nottinghamshire and the village of Langley Mill in Derbyshire, England. It was opened by the Great Northern Railway on its Derbyshire Extension in 1875–6.

It lay on the branch from Awsworth Junction, where it crossed the Giltbrook Viaduct, on the way to Pinxton. At the time it was in Nottinghamshire, but since recent boundary changes it would now be in on the border of Nottinghamshire and Derbyshire. It closed in 1963 and was demolished by 1976, and the trackbed was used for the Eastwood Bypass.

Langley Mill and Eastwood was nearby on the Midland Railway Erewash Valley Line.

Preceding station	Disused railways	Following station
Newthorpe, Greasley and Shipley Gate	Great Northern Railway; GNR Derbyshire and Staffordshire Extension; Pinxton Branch	Codnor Park and Selston
