= Ilkeston railway station =

Railway station in Derbyshire, England

Ilkeston
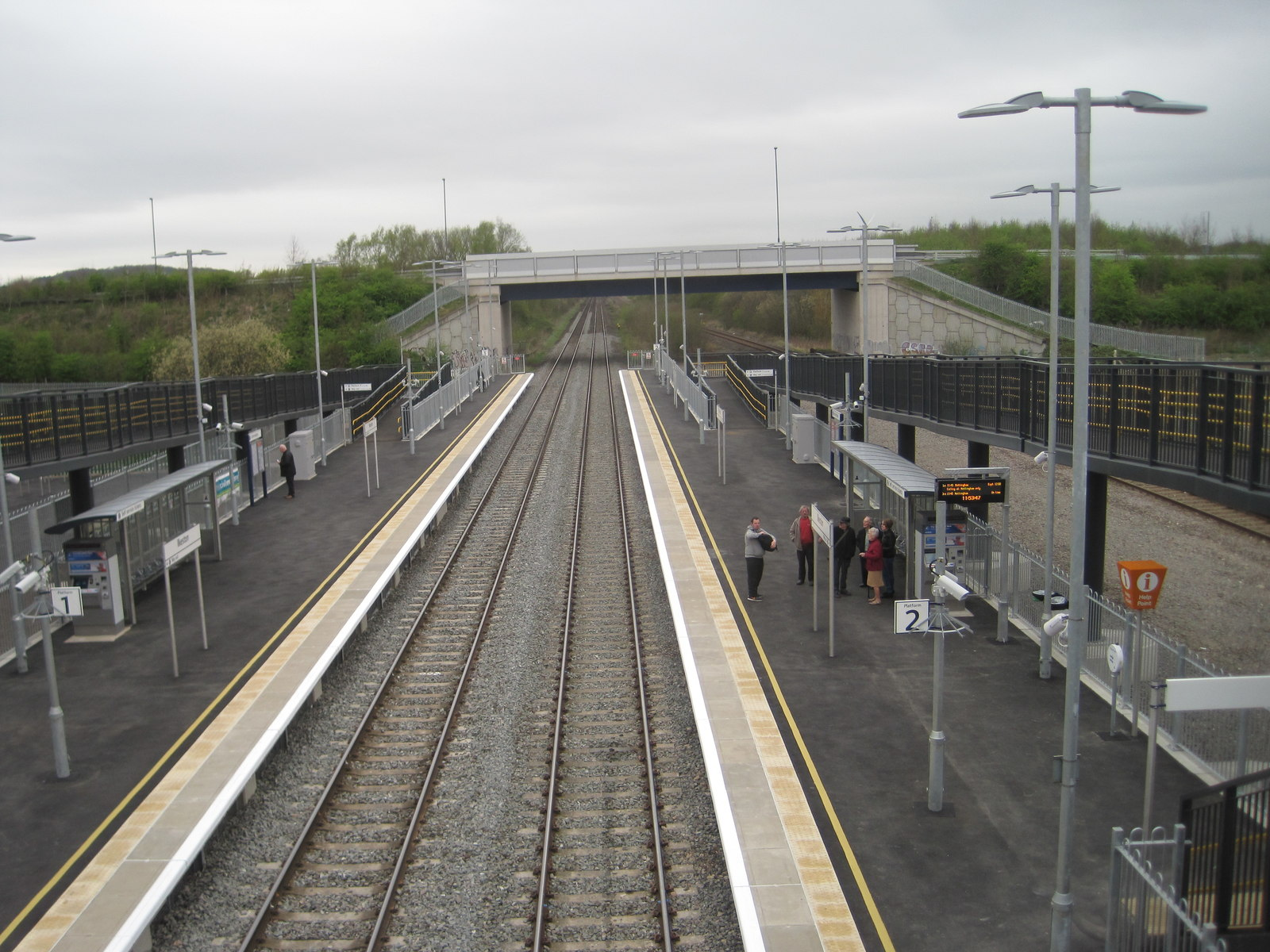
- The station in April 2017

General information
- Location: Ilkeston, Erewash; England
- Coordinates: 52.9794°N 1.2949°W
- Managed by: East Midlands Railway
- Platforms: 2

Other information
- Station code: ILN

Key dates
- 2 April 2017: Opened

Passengers
- 2020/21: ▼25,492
- 2021/22: ▲101,026
- 2022/23: ▲127,512
- 2023/24: ▲149,254
- 2024/25: ▲203,260
Location
Notes
- Passenger statistics from the Office of Rail and Road

Ilkeston railway station serves the town of Ilkeston, Derbyshire, England. It is located at the site of the former Ilkeston Junction and Cossall station, on the Midland Main Line between Nottingham and Langley Mill. It is served by Northern Nottingham to Leeds services and by East Midlands Railway.

During 2013, Derbyshire County Council presented its business case for the construction of a railway station for Ilkeston; at this point, it was considered to be the largest town to have an operational passenger line running through it but without any station serving it. Later that year, the project gained official backing and financing from the UK government via the New Stations Fund, which is managed by national railway infrastructure maintenance company Network Rail. Despite original plans to open the station during 2014, construction work was repeatedly delayed to account for numerous factors at the site selected, including the potential for flooding, ground instability from historic mining activity, and the presence of endangered species. During April 2016, work finally commenced at the site; the construction process, which involved several bespoke designs to accommodate site conditions, was completed within ten months. The new station was opened on 2 April 2017. It has two platforms, ticket vending machines, a wheelchair-accessible footbridge, a sizable car park and a taxi rank. Early passenger numbers have exceeded expectations.

== Proposal and financing ==
In 2009, the town of Ilkeston, Derbyshire, became one of the largest towns in England to have an active passenger railway line passing through it but without any railway station to service it. All three of its previous railway stations, Ilkeston North, Ilkeston Town, and Ilkeston Junction and Cossall, had been closed during the 1950s and 1960s, some as a result of the Beeching cuts. While the remains of Ilkeston Town Station had been demolished decades before to make way for a Tesco supermarket on the site and Ilkeston North Station had been replaced by a police station, the site of the former Ilkeston Junction station had been used as a scrapyard and was considered to have become wasteland.

During 2009, a proposal was included for the establishment of a new Park and Ride (or Parkway) station for Ilkeston in the Connecting Communities report by the Association of Train Operating Companies. During 2013, Derbyshire County Council, who had taken an interest in the initiative, assembled a business case for the construction of a new station on the former site of Ilkeston Junction Station. It was found that commuter times into the city of Nottingham could be reduced, as well as increased job opportunities for people living in the town along the line and that such a station is likely to boost the local economy. Reportedly, 160,000 passengers per year were expected to use the new station initially, and this figure is anticipated to eventually rise to 250,000 over time.

Some of the funding for the project was provided from the UK government via the New Stations Fund. Broken down, the new station project was financed by £2.26 million of funding from Derbyshire County Council, a further £6.674 million from the New Stations Fund and £1 million was contributed by the Nottingham Housing Market Area fund.

Network Rail was appointed by Derbyshire County Council to oversee the project's procurement and installation, while contractor Galliford Try was responsible for performing the construction work itself. The cost of the project, which had been originally estimated at £6.5 million, was reported as being £10 million during 2016. During May 2013, the selection of Ilkeston was confirmed, along with an announcement of the station's opening date having been scheduled to occur during 2014.

== Construction ==
=== Preparatory works ===
During June 2014, preliminary work at the site discovered the presence of protected great crested newts; the effort to capture and transfer the newts to another location resulting in the start of construction being delayed until October 2014. This was not the only factor, as it was also necessary to develop additional flood protection measures, as the site is located on the flood plain of the River Erewash, to sufficiently protect the station; combined, these tasks delayed the expected opening date into spring 2015.

In October 2014, it was announced that the cost of proposed flood protection work had exceeded the available budget for the project and thus required a cheaper solution to be found; eventually the design of station was de-scoped to avoid working inside of the flood plain area. At the same time, it was announced that this had further delayed the start of construction until 2015, and pushed the opening date to "late 2015". Additional work was performed at the site during this time, such as the including the assessment and stabilisation of nearby mine workings.

The design for the proposed station was developed by engineering firm AECOM on behalf of Derbyshire County Council. As designed, it features two separate platforms, one each side of the twin track railway running in between. At 100 meters, these are long enough to accommodate four-carriages train. A third track, which serves as a bi-directional slow line solely for the use of freight trains, curves around the back of the new station; as such, it intentionally does not have a platform face. The station is intended to be operated entirely unstaffed.

Access to the station is provided in the form of a dedicated dropping-off point, along with disabled car parking spaces and a taxi rank on the station's west side, which is accessible from Station Street; on the eastern side of the station, a longer-term car park is provided with a connection towards the nearby A610. The size of this car park had to be curtailed due to flooding and stability concerns affecting some of the site. Pedestrian access is provided via a new steel footbridge, completed with accessibility-compliant ramps for wheelchair users, which has replaced the site's original footbridge which had been built for the former Ilkeston Junction station.

During February 2015, the finding of more great crested newts at the site was attributed as having caused further delays for the start of construction; as a result, the station's intended opening date was expected to be achieved by August 2016, but one year later, this had become "late autumn". Further delays led to the opening date being pushed back into the first quarter of 2017. During January 2017, the scheduled opening date of Sunday, 2 April 2017 was finally announced.

=== Construction ===
During April 2016, contractors from Galliford Try started upon the first groundwork for the new station following the completion of various preliminary works. Clearing and preparing the site included the demolition of the old footbridge, track reprofiling, and the movement of around 10,000 tonnes of material for the two car parks and attenuation ponds, the latter being a flood mitigation measure.

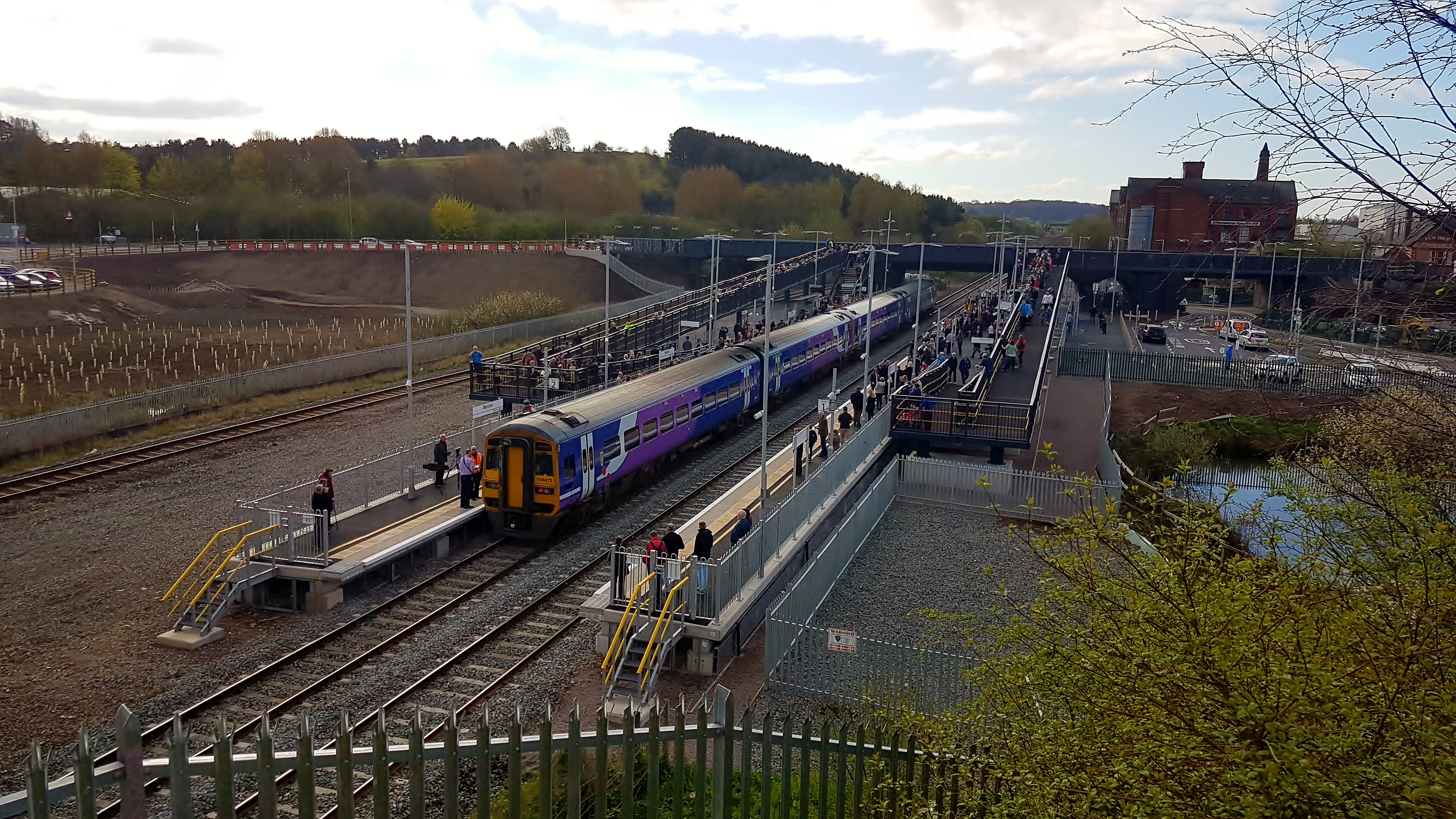
Ilkeston railway station on opening day

The erection of the new footbridge, which was pre-fabricated in sections, required the use of several cranes, the largest of which weighing 500 tonnes. The footbridge featured an innovative foundation approach which is designed to resist ground pressure from two separate directions. To cope with flooding, a custom-developed pre-fabricated platform design was adopted, using pre-cast concrete beam and slabs. The beams and slabs of the platforms were installed using excavators; while rearward slabs could be installed during daytime working, the beams and slabs on the edges nearest to the active railway had to be positioned during line blocks or night-time possessions. Once laid, the concrete slabs were tarmaced, except for the tactile strip along the platform edge used as an aid by the sight-impaired. The fitting out of the platforms, including mechanical and electrical works, LED lighting, CCTV and ticket machines, was undertaken by Railway Electrical Services.

According to industry publication Rail Engineer, by 6 February 2017, the new station had been mainly completed; the following two months involved clean-up work, as well as testing and formal evaluation work performed by Ricardo Rail and the Office of Rail and Road, which was necessary as to gain approval for the station to be opened. During the construction process, an unofficial website dedicated to the monitoring and reporting of progress on the station's construction had been established; this site also hosted articles written by various local residents and business owners, as well as video footage of some of the construction work.

=== Completion ===
On Sunday 2 April 2017, services at the station commenced as planned; the opening was attended by hundreds of passengers and locals. By the start of July 2017, it was announced that over 30,000 passenger journeys had already been conducted to and from the station; according to Jake Kelly, the managing director of East Midlands Trains, this volume was regarded as being in excess of expectations.

== Services ==
Most calls here are provided by the Northern Trains Leeds - Sheffield - Nottingham service, which operates hourly in each direction (less frequently after 20:00). Some early morning/late evening trains start or finish at Sheffield. East Midlands stops are limited to a small number of Liverpool Lime Street - Sheffield - Nottingham/Norwich trains during peak periods and in the early afternoon. Sunday service levels are broadly similar to those on weekdays, albeit with a later start.

| Preceding station | National Rail | Following station |
|---|---|---|
| Nottingham | Northern Trains Nottingham-Leeds | Langley Mill |
| Nottingham | East Midlands Railway Liverpool-Nottingham-Norwich Limited Service | Langley Mill |
