= Langley Mill railway station =

Railway station in Derbyshire, England

Coordinates: 53.018°N 1.331°W

Langley Mill
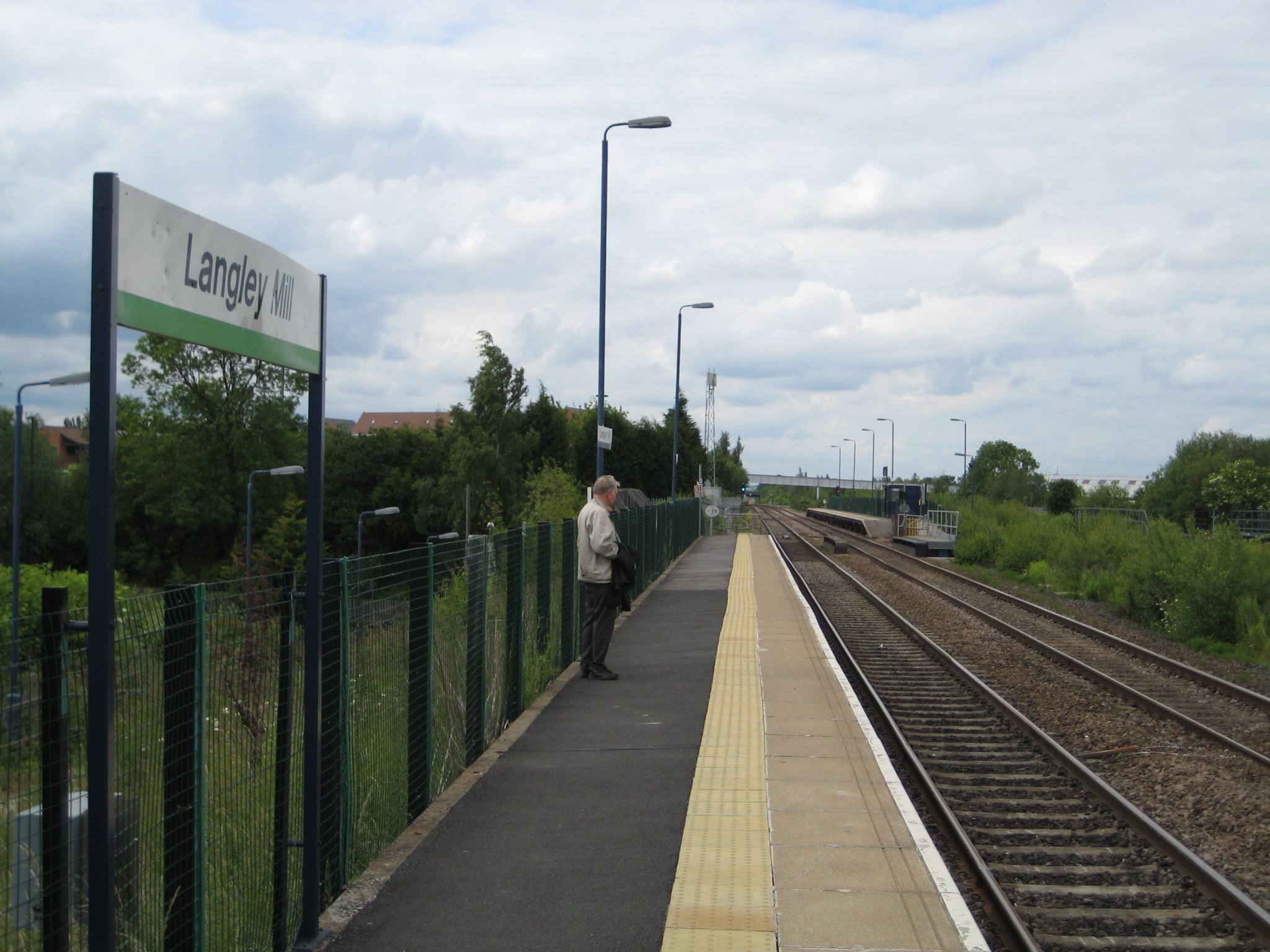

General information
- Location: Langley Mill, Borough of Amber Valley; England
- Grid reference: SK449470
- Managed by: East Midlands Railway
- Platforms: 2

Other information
- Station code: LGM
- Classification: DfT category F1

Key dates
- 6 September 1847: Opened as Langley Mill for Heanor
- 1 November 1876: Renamed Langley Mill and Eastwood
- 11 September 1933: Renamed Langley Mill and Eastwood for Heanor
- 2 January 1967: Closed
- 12 May 1986: Reopened as Langley Mill

Passengers
- 2020/21: ▼16,998
- 2021/22: ▲64,610
- 2022/23: ▲80,058
- 2023/24: ▲85,018
- 2024/25: ▲100,238
Location
Notes
- Passenger statistics from the Office of Rail and Road

Langley Mill railway station (formerly known as Langley Mill for Heanor and Langley Mill and Eastwood) on the Erewash Valley Line serves the large village of Langley Mill and the towns of Heanor in Derbyshire and Eastwood in Nottinghamshire, England. The station is 12 miles (19 km) north of Nottingham.

The station lies between Nottingham and Sheffield and is managed by East Midlands Railway.

== Services ==
Northern Trains run an hourly service between Nottingham and Leeds via Sheffield that stops at Langley Mill. This service started from the December 2008 timetable change.

East Midlands Railway operate a few services per day from Langley Mill southbound to Nottingham and beyond (usually Norwich) and northbound to Sheffield (usually continuing to Liverpool Lime Street).

Buses that serve Langley Mill are Rainbow 1, 33, 34 and others that can be found on the Trent Barton website.

Preceding station	National Rail	Following station
Ilkeston	Northern Trains Nottingham-Leeds	Alfreton
Ilkeston	East Midlands Railway Liverpool-Norwich Limited Service	Alfreton

== Facilities ==
The station is unstaffed and has two offset platforms (linked by underpass), with platform 1 (for Chesterfield and Sheffield) the more southerly of the pair. There are no permanent buildings other than standard waiting shelters; there is no ticket machine available, so all tickets must be purchased prior to travel or on the train. Digital CIS displays, automatic announcements, timetable poster boards and customer help points on each side provide train running information. Step-free access is only available to platform 1 (via ramp, platform 2 is reachable only by stairs).

== History ==
The station was opened on the Erewash Valley Line by the Midland Railway in 1847 and known as Langley Mill for Heanor. However, in 1876, the GNR built Eastwood and Langley Mill on its branch from the Derbyshire and Staffordshire Extension at Awsworth Junction. The Midland station then became Langley Mill and Eastwood.

In 1895, the Midland built a line from here through Heanor to Ripley with an adjacent station of its own. This was not profitable and closed in May 1926.

It was closed to passenger traffic on 2 January 1967 as a result of the Beeching Axe (along with Ilkeston Junction and Cossall, Alfreton and all the other remaining local stations on the same route), but was subsequently reopened by British Rail in May 1986. The former station (which was demolished after closure) had platforms opposite each other and was located on the site of the present platform 2. A new northbound platform had to be provided when the station was rebuilt, as the former site north of Station Road had been redeveloped. This is located close to where the old Ripley branch line platform once stood.

=== Stationmasters ===
- Richard Eaton until 1861
- J.C. Hayes from 1861 (formerly station master at Borrowash)
- James Hay ca. 1866
- Edward Eagle 1868 - 1898 (formerly station master at Stapleford and Sandiacre)
- Richard Withnall Wain 1898 - 1911
- Samuel Eaton 1911 - 1926
- William Tunn 1926 - 1937 (formerly station master at Alfreton)
