= Heanor railway station (Great Northern Railway) =

Former railway station in Derbyshire, England

Coordinates: 53.0104°N 1.3670°W

Heanor
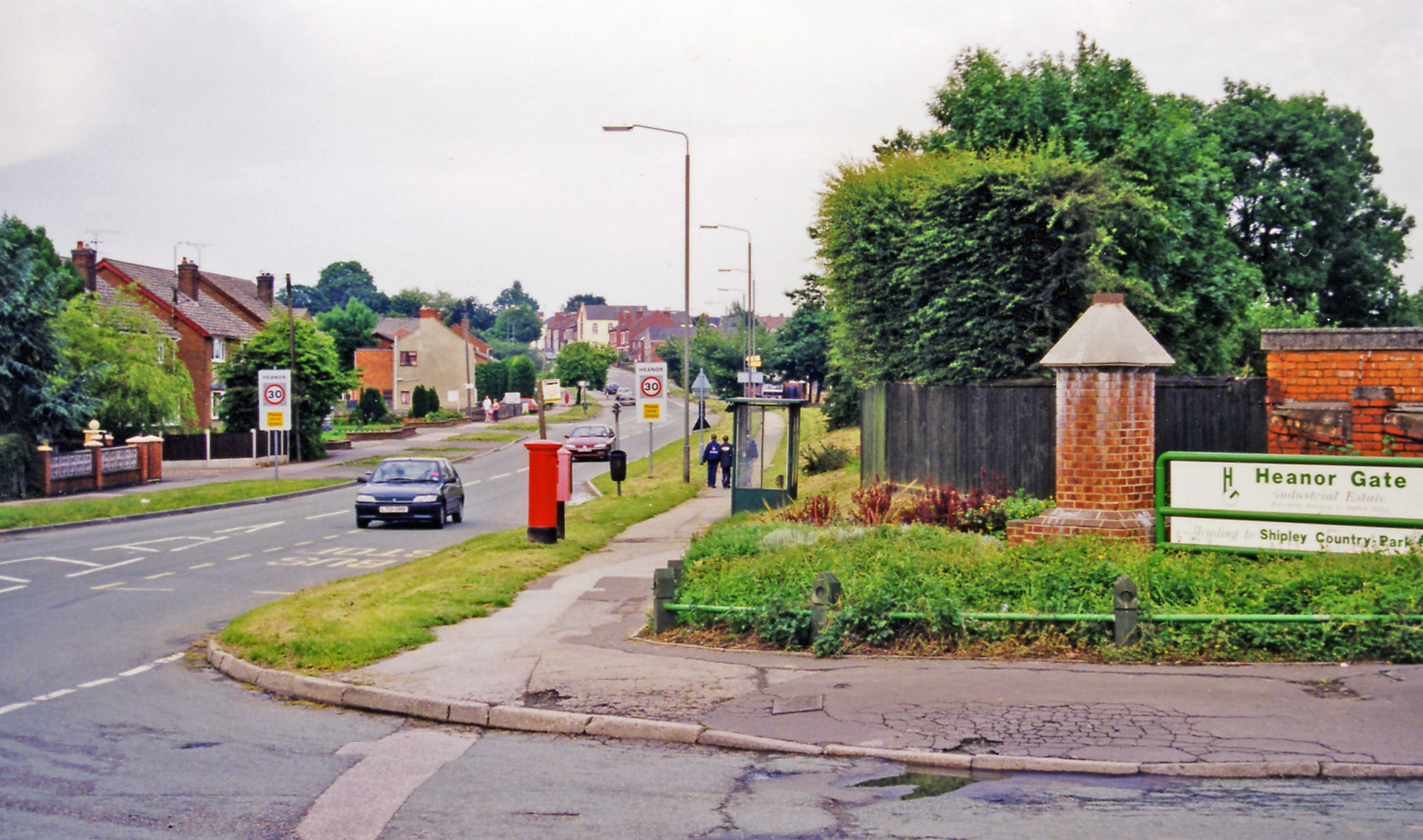
- Station location (1998)

General information
- Location: Heanor, Amber Valley, Derbyshire; England

Other information
- Status: Disused

History
- Original company: Great Northern Railway
- Pre-grouping: Great Northern Railway
- Post-grouping: London and North Eastern Railway

Key dates
- 1 July 1891: Station opens
- 30 April 1928: closed for passengers but continued in use for workmen
- 2 October 1939: reopened for passengers
- 4 December 1939: Station closed for passengers
- 7 October 1963: closed for freight
Location

Heanor railway station was a former railway station at Heanor in Derbyshire, England, opened in 1891. It was the terminus of the branch from Ilkeston on the Great Northern Railway Derbyshire Extension line.

It was one of two stations called "Heanor". The other had been opened by the Midland Railway the year before. It was not until 1950 that British Railways renamed them Heanor North and Heanor South. Unofficially, the station was known locally as 'Heanor Gate' to separate it from the other Heanor station before they were both officially renamed.

The GNR station closed to passenger services in 1939 and for goods in 1963. The last stationmaster was H.H. Voss, also a Derbyshire County Council Alderman who retired after 44 years service on the railway locally in October 1963.
