= West Hallam railway station =

Former railway station in Derbyshire, England

Coordinates: 52.9636°N 1.3680°W

West Hallam
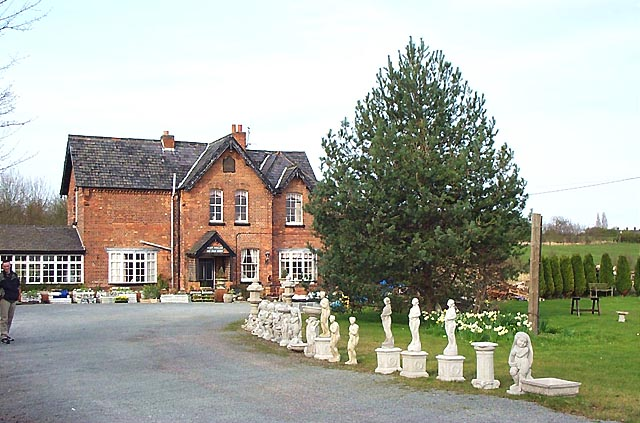
- The former station house is now a garden centre.

General information
- Location: Stanley and West Hallam, Erewash; England
- Grid reference: SK425408
- Platforms: 2

Other information
- Status: Disused

History
- Original company: Great Northern Railway
- Post-grouping: London and North Eastern Railway; London Midland Region of British Railways

Key dates
- 1 April 1878: Opened
- 7 September 1964: Closed
Location

West Hallam railway station was a railway station located between the villages of Stanley and West Hallam in Derbyshire, England. It was opened by the Great Northern Railway (Great Britain) on its Derbyshire Extension in 1878.

== History ==
The station was originally called Stanley, but its name was quickly changed to West Hallam for Dale Abbey to avoid confusion with another station in Yorkshire. It was provided with substantial brick buildings; a two-storey station master's house and the usual single storey offices on the main platform with a small timber waiting room on the other.

On a Sunday evening in October 1884 Godfrey Bostock (68) and his wife Mary (67), who lived in Kimberley and had been visiting relatives in Smalley Common, were killed while crossing the track at West Hallam Station. Apparently they mistook a light engine working from Derby as their train and while hurrying to cross the line to the platform were both hit and died immediately from head injuries. Following a recommendation of the coroner at their inquest, West Hallam became one of the few intermediate stations on the line to be given a footbridge.

Beside the presence of productive collieries, it was particularly busy during World War II due to a nearby ordnance depot, a satellite of that at Chilwell. Sunday passengers services finished in 1939, and it closed completely in 1964.

From Ilkeston the line climbed through West Hallam to a summit at Morley Tunnel before descending towards Breadsall.

Preceding station	Disused railways	Following station
Ilkeston North	London Midland Region of British Railways (Derby) Friargate Line	Breadsall

== Present day ==
Most signs of the railway have disappeared apart from the station building itself. Part was demolished on closure, but the main part is now a private dwelling known as 'Station House'. The large cutting which took the line from the station past Stanley was filled in using spoil from the neighbouring former Stanley colliery so that the route of the line can only be established by using field boundaries today.
