= Ilkeston Town railway station =

Former railway station in Derbyshire, England

Ilkeston Town
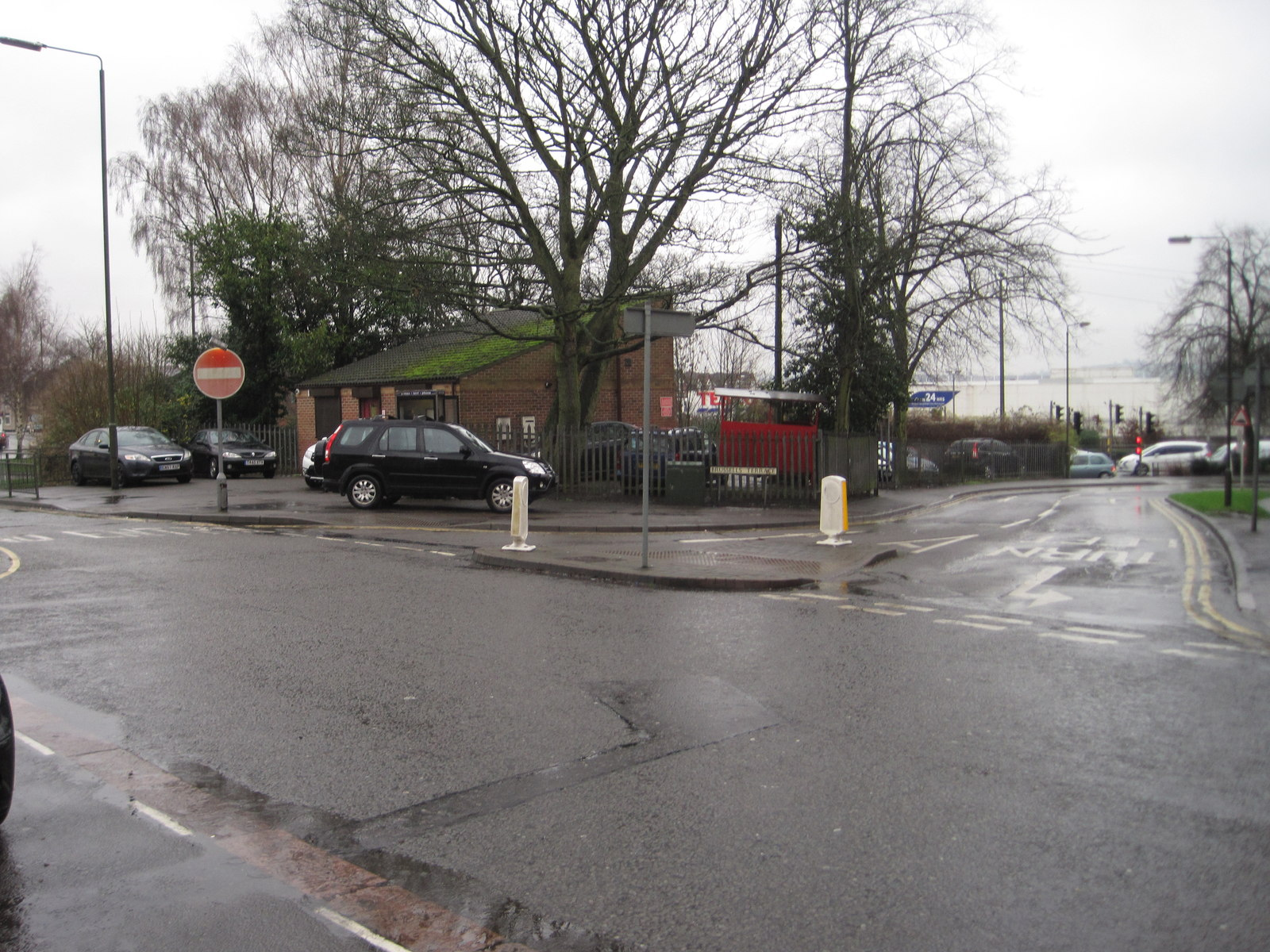
- The site of the station in 2016

General information
- Location: Ilkeston, Erewash; England
- Coordinates: 52.9772°N 1.3086°W

Other information
- Status: Disused

History
- Original company: Midland Railway
- Pre-grouping: Midland Railway
- Post-grouping: London Midland and Scottish Railway

Key dates
- 6 September 1847: Station opened as Ilkeston
- 2 May 1870: closed
- 1 July 1879: reopened as Ilkeston Town
- 16 June 1947: partially closed
- 10 July 1950: Station closes
Location

Ilkeston Town railway station was a railway station which served the town of Ilkeston in Derbyshire, England. It was opened in 1847 by the Midland Railway.

This station was connected to the Erewash Valley Line by a short branch from Ilkeston Junction, the route of which roughly followed the present Millership Way and which was served by horse-drawn railway carriages for some years.

By 1853, three trains were running daily each way between Nottingham and Ilkeston via Long Eaton. However, local newspapers contain many letters of complaint in the 1850s and 1860s regarding the poor standard of waiting rooms and other facilities at the local stations and even about the rudeness of the staff. Some of the Midland Railway's Directors, their General Manager and Engineer visited Ilkeston in 1860 to discuss rail users' concerns, although little seems to have been accomplished from the visit.

The original station, opened on 6 September 1847 and named Ilkeston, was closed on 2 May 1870 but remodelled in response to the arrival of the Great Northern Railway (Great Britain) Derbyshire Extension line through its station later known as Ilkeston North. The station, now named Ilkeston Town, re-opened on 1 July 1879.

It carried a shuttle service from Ilkeston Junction which was never particularly popular since the GNR provided a direct main line service. Some services were also provided to Nottingham and Chesterfield From 1882 the former were routed along the Bennerley Junction route to Basford, with six services a day, but they ended at the beginning of the First World War.

In the Grouping of all lines (into four main companies) in 1923 the station became part of the London, Midland and Scottish Railway .

The station closed to passengers on 10 July 1950, having been open on a restricted basis since 16 June 1947, and goods operations had ceased by 1960. The tracks were lifted and the footbridge removed. The site is now occupied by a roundabout at the end of Ilkeston's Chalons Way by-pass and a large Tesco supermarket.

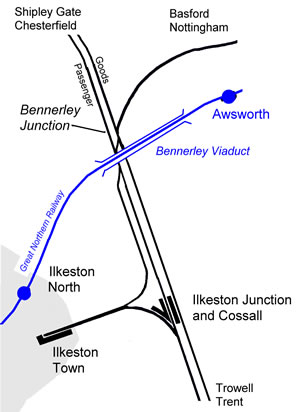
The Ilkeston Branch approx 1910

Preceding station	Disused railways	Following station
Terminus	Midland Railway; Ilkeston branch	Ilkeston Junction and Cossall; Line and station closed
Terminus	Midland Railway; Bennerley and Bulwell Railway	Kimberley West; Line and station closed
