= Ilkeston Junction and Cossall railway station =

Former railway station in Derbyshire, England

Coordinates: 52°58′43″N 1°17′42″W

Ilkeston Junction and Cossall
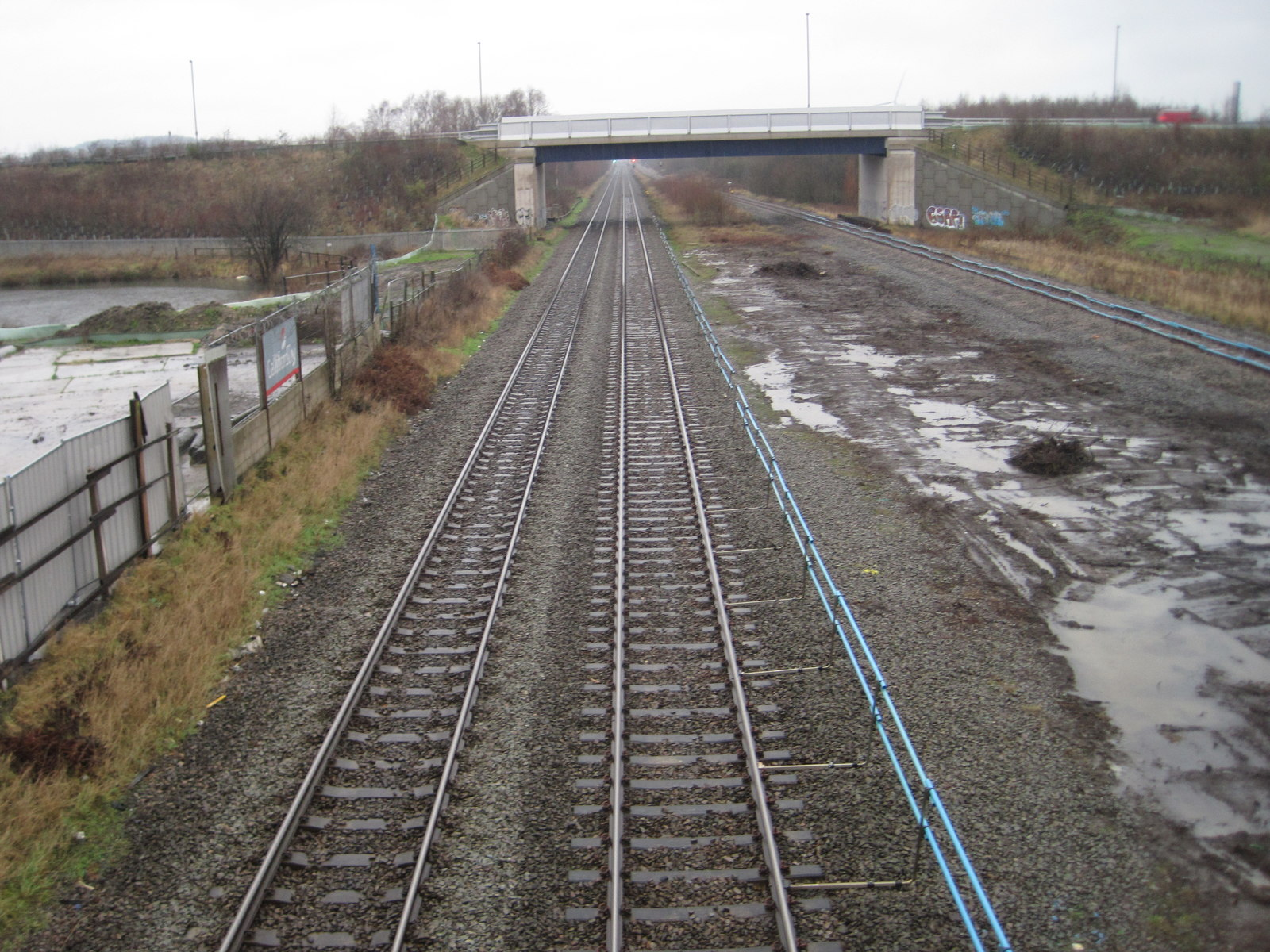
- Station site in 2016.

General information
- Location: Ilkeston, Erewash; England

Other information
- Status: Disused

History
- Original company: Midland Railway
- Pre-grouping: Midland Railway
- Post-grouping: London Midland and Scottish Railway

Key dates
- 6 September 1847: First station partially opened as Ilkeston Junction
- 1 August 1858: Fully opened
- 2 May 1870: Replaced by new Ilkeston station
- 1 July 1879: Renamed Ilkeston Junction
- 1 December 1890: renamed Ilkeston Junction and Cossall
- 2 January 1967: Station closed
- 2 April 2017: New Station Ilkeston railway station built on site
Location

Ilkeston Junction and Cossall railway station was a railway station which served the town of Ilkeston in Derbyshire, England.

== History ==
It was opened in 1847 by the Midland Railway on the Erewash Valley Line at the junction of a short branch to the town itself.

The station became known locally as Ilkeston Junction, and when first opened had no road leading from it to either Cossall or Ilkeston. Passengers would use farm tracks and the canal towpath to reach its isolated location.

In 1870 a proper road ('Station Road' or 'Station Street') was completed to the station from Ilkeston, the original station closing in that year after completion of a new station further north. The new station opened on 2 May 1870; originally named Ilkeston, it was renamed Ilkeston Junction on 1 July 1879, and Ilkeston Junction and Cossall on 1 December 1890.

It carried a shuttle service to Ilkeston Town railway station which was never particularly popular since the GNR provided a direct main line service. Some services were also provided to Nottingham and Chesterfield. Since the latter passed through the north curve of the junction, they were unable to call at the station. The same was true of Nottingham trains when they ran on the short-lived branch between Bennerley Junction and Basford.

In the Grouping of all lines (into four main companies) in 1923 the station became part of the London, Midland and Scottish Railway .

The branch closed in 1960 (although passenger traffic had ceased by the late 1940s) and the tracks were lifted, with the junction station finally closing to all traffic on 2 January 1967.

There were several subsequent proposals for a new station to be opened on the Erewash Line, with Ilkeston often quoted in the press as being 'the largest town in England without a railway station'. As part of the new station fund set out in March 2013, Ilkeston, Pye Corner and Lea Bridge were narrowed down as the three most likely stations to open or reopen, with the final announcement being made in May. Work started in summer 2014 on site clearance work to construct new station. The new Ilkeston station, built on the same site as Ilkeston Junction and Cossall, opened on 2 April 2017.

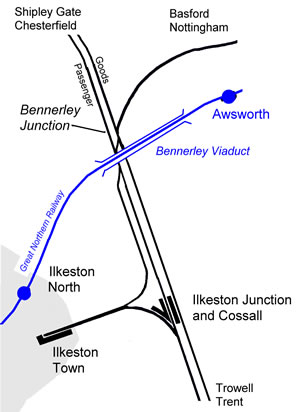
The Ilkeston Branch approx 1910

Preceding station	Historical railways	Following station
Shipley Gate; Line open, station closed	Midland Railway; Erewash Valley Line	Trowell; Line open, station closed
	Disused railways	
Ilkeston Town; Line and station closed	Midland Railway; Ilkeston branch	Terminus
