= Ilkeston North railway station =

Former railway station in Derbyshire, England

Coordinates: 52°58′46″N 1°18′41″W

Ilkeston North
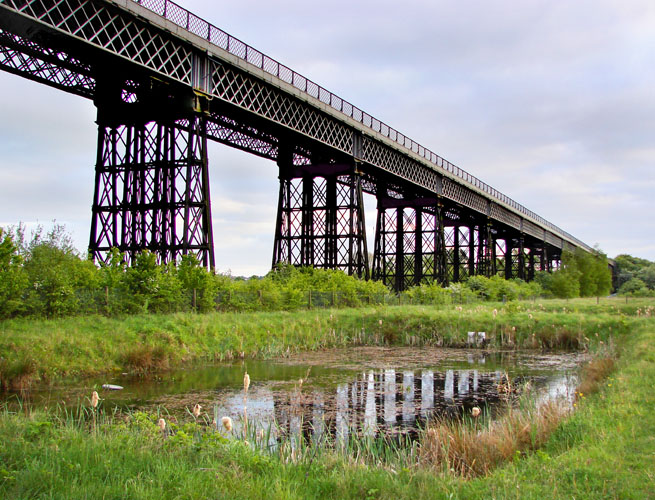
- Bennerley Viaduct near Ilkeston carried the former GNR/LNER line from their Ilkeston North Station to Awsworth, pictured in May 2009.

General information
- Location: Ilkeston, Erewash; England
- Grid reference: SK463427
- Platforms: 2

Other information
- Status: Disused

History
- Original company: Great Northern Railway
- Pre-grouping: Great Northern Railway
- Post-grouping: London and North Eastern Railway; London Midland Region of British Railways

Key dates
- 1 April 1878: Opened as Ilkeston
- 1 July 1950: Renamed Ilkeston North
- 7 September 1964: Closed to passengers
- 3 June 1968: Goods facilities withdrawn
Location

Ilkeston North railway station was a railway station in Ilkeston, Derbyshire. It was opened by the Great Northern Railway on its Derbyshire Extension in 1878 and closed in 1964.

== History ==
From Awsworth the line crossed the Erewash Valley by means of the impressive Bennerley Viaduct which has been partly preserved. It then made the climb to Ilkeston before crossing the Nut Brook towards West Hallam. At Stanton Junction lines led northwards to Heanor and southwards to Stanton Ironworks. Ilkeston at one time had three stations, Ilkeston Town being on a branch leading from the Midland Railway's Erewash Valley Line at the third station, Ilkeston Junction and Cossall.

Preceding station	Disused railways	Following station
Awsworth	London Midland Region of British Railways (Derby) Friargate Line	West Hallam
Marlpool	Heanor Branch Line; Great Northern Railway	Terminus

== Present day ==
The station has been demolished and in the 1990 a police station and doctor's surgery and pharmacy were built on its site. Some of the remaining track bed has also been built on, with the remainder to the East forming the Cotmanhay Linear Park.
