= Erewash Valley line =

Railway line in the UK

The Erewash Valley line is a railway line in England, running from Long Eaton, between Nottingham and Derby, and Clay Cross, near Chesterfield. The southern part was opened by the Midland Railway in 1847 as far as Codnor Park, where it connected to established ironworks, and soon after, a line to Pinxton and Mansfield.

It linked numerous collieries and ironstone pits, and encouraged the development of the so-called "concealed" Nottinghamshire coalfield, where the coal measures were below a thick limestone stratum. The line was extended north to Clay Cross, on the way to Chesterfield, in 1861, and in doing so formed an alternative through southward route. Congestion on the Midland Railway was a grave problem, and the line enabled diversion of some goods and mineral traffic. Large marshalling yards were developed at Toton, at the southern end of the line, to handle the huge volume of coal traffic.

The Erewash Valley Line continues in use at the present day.

== Background ==
=== Dominance of coal and iron ===
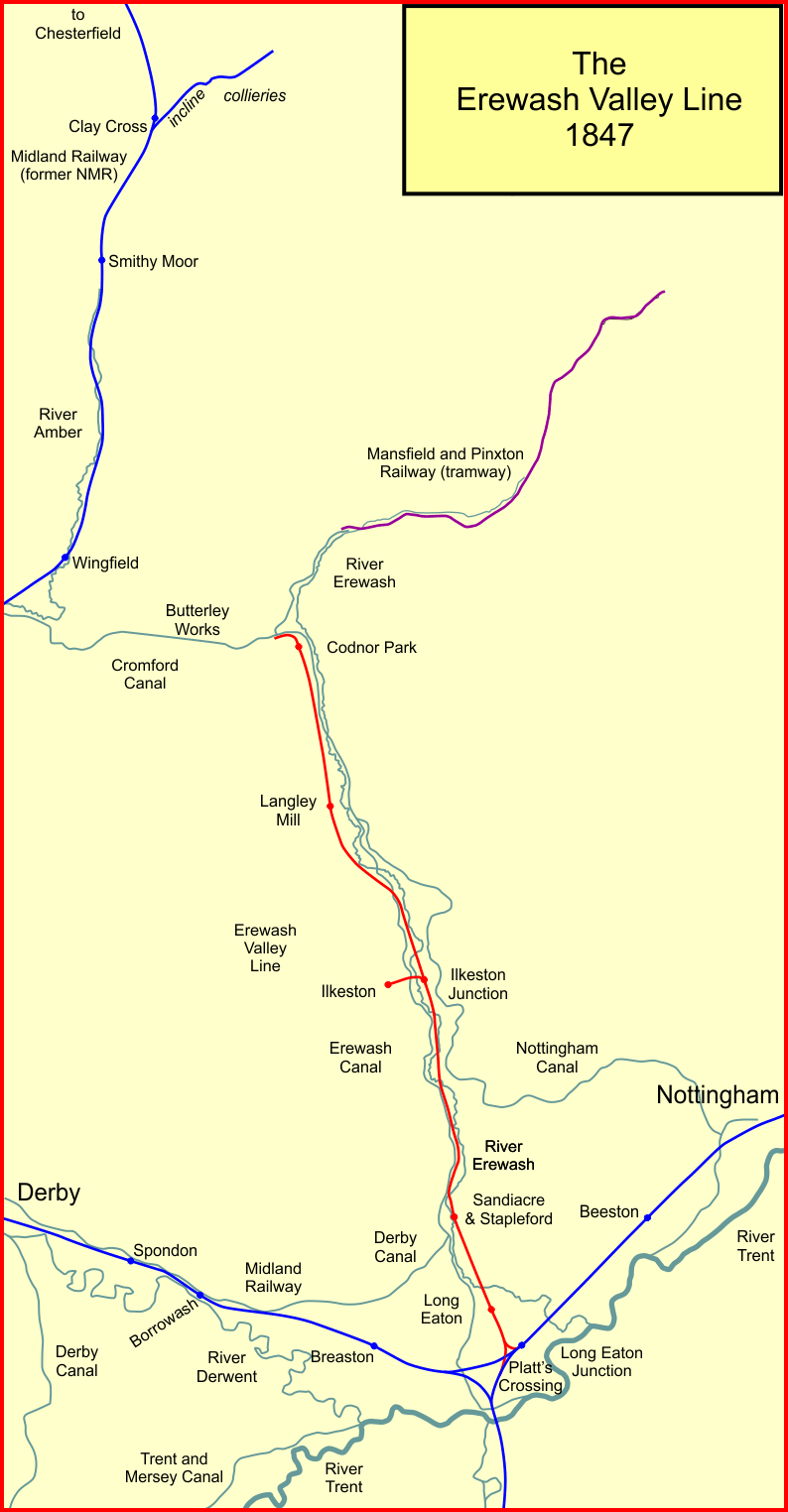
The Erewash Valley Line in 1847

For centuries there have been colliery workings in the Erewash Valley of Nottinghamshire. The difficulty with a heavy and bulky commodity was conveying it to market over poor roads. That market was in Leicester, which at the time the supreme industrial centre in the district. In the latter half of the eighteenth century canals and navigable rivers became a viable means of transport.

Nottinghamshire coalowners had become used to supplying Leicester, due to the convenience of the navigable River Soar. This had become a lucrative business, until the opening of the Leicester and Swannington Railway in 1832 gave cheaper access to the West Leicestershire collieries, to the detriment of Nottinghamshire. In the 1836 session of Parliament the Midland Counties Railway was promoted, to run from Nottingham and Derby, through Leicester to Rugby. At Rugby it would join the London and Birmingham Railway, giving access to London. The Nottingham and Derby arms would come together at Long Eaton, and there was to be a northwards branch from there to the collieries at Pinxton, up the Erewash Valley. The promoters let it be known that they intended to extend that line later, to join the North Midland Railway at Chesterfield. The NMR and the MCR were competitors, and this announcement alarmed the NMR, as it would take much of its traffic away, and it vigorously opposed the parliamentary bill.

Most of the finance for the line was to come from Liverpool commercial interests, and the turmoil alarmed them. Not wanting an expensive parliamentary battle, they insisted that the Pinxton branch be dropped from the MCR scheme. The Midland Counties Railway was authorised, without the Pinxton branch, on 21 June 1836.

=== Erewash Valley Railway Company ===
The Midland Railway was formed by the Midland Railway Consolidation Act 1844 (7 & 8 Vict. c. xviii) of 10 May, by the amalgamation of the Midland Counties Railway, the North Midland Railway, and the Birmingham and Derby Junction Railway. This brought together a considerable network of railways, that had hitherto been competitors and were now allies.

Some of the Nottinghamshire coal owners now revived their scheme for a railway connection from Pinxton. Instead of connecting into the former Midland Counties line they decided to form an independent Erewash Valley Railway Company, to run from Pinxton to the Midland Railway at Long Eaton. The Midland board were alarmed at this; the rich mineral workings of the Erewash Valley would be under the control of another company; moreover an extension north to Clay Cross would form a new, shorter route and abstract from their own main line: exactly the same issue that had vexed the North Midland Railway in 1836.

Erewash Valley Railway Act 1845
- Act of Parliament
- Parliament of the United Kingdom
- Long title: An Act for making a Railway from the Midland Railway in the Parish of Sawley in the County of Derby to the Parish of Alfreton in the same County, together with several Branch Railways communicating therewith, to be called "The Erewash Valley Railway."
- Citation: 8 & 9 Vict. c. clxxxix
- Territorial extent: United Kingdom

Dates
- Royal assent: 4 August 1845
Other legislation
Amends	Erewash Canal Act 1777

Text of statute as originally enacted

The solution was for the Midland Railway to use its commercial strength to take over the Erewash Valley Railway scheme. During the parliamentary process, the Midland agreed to adopt the Erewash Valley Railway Company, guaranteeing its shareholders a dividend of 6% on their capital of £6,145,000. The Erewash Valley Railway Act 1845 (8 & 9 Vict. c. clxxxix) authorising the construction of the line and its takeover was passed on 4 August 1845.

== Openings ==
=== Opening of the main line ===
The line was opened for public traffic on 6 September 1847, and on that day trains ran from Codnor Park to Long Eaton Junction. Codnor Park was already well established in the ironfounding industry. Long Eaton Junction was the focus of lines west to Derby, east to Nottingham and south to Leicester. The new Erewash Valley line made a fork at Long Eaton: there was a sharp north-to-east curve towards Nottingham, and a southward line in the direction of Leicester. This crossed the former Midland Counties Derby to Nottingham line on the level. The intersection was known as "Platt's crossing", and it proved a notorious and very unsatisfactory arrangement.

As the mineral traffic increased, Platts Crossing was seen as a dangerous nuisance, but it was not until 1862 that the Trent Junctions (as they came to be called) were remodelled. A new curve allowed the diversion of the original Derby – Nottingham line, eliminating Platts Crossing.

=== Opening to Pinxton and Mansfield ===
The line was extended to Pinxton through Pye Bridge on 9 October 1849. Through working to Mansfield was possible as the Midland Railway had rebuilt the original tramway. The Mansfield and Pinxton Railway had been built as a stone-block sleepered railway with horse traction (bullock traction at first) and some very sharp curves. The Midland Railway had acquired it, and closed and upgraded it, reopening it the same day as its own extension to Pinxton.

=== Ironworks ===
There were two ironworks close to the line. The dominant site was the Butterley Company works at Ripley; this had been long established as a successful manufacturer of iron, and constructor of iron structures. The termination of the 1847 opening of the Erewash Valley Line at Codnor Park connected with the internal tramways of the Butterley company.

Of secondary importance at the time of opening of the line was the Stanton Ironworks at Ilkeston. The course of the line traced numerous iron ore deposits and coal seams, as well as locations where limestone -- a key ingredient in the iron-making process -- could be worked. The opening of the line encouraged a huge expansion in the ironworks' activity, although Stanton's expansion was slow to get under way. Corresponding increases in colliery working were apparent, both to service the ironworks locally and for industrial and domestic consumption elsewhere.

=== Ilkeston ===
The Erewash Valley main line was constructed to maximise the connections to collieries and ironworks, and by-passed Ilkeston, although it was the largest town on the line. A short branch line was provided to Ilkeston, opening on the same day as the main line. Its traffic potential was disappointing, and in 1870 the branch was closed to passengers and the town was served only by a wayside station on the main line. The Great Northern Railway built a line that passed through the town centre, opening to passengers on 1 April 1878, and the Midland Railway hastened to reopen the branch line, on 1 July 1879. As it was a dead-end shuttle line, it was always inferior to the GNR's through services.

== Northwards from Pye Bridge ==
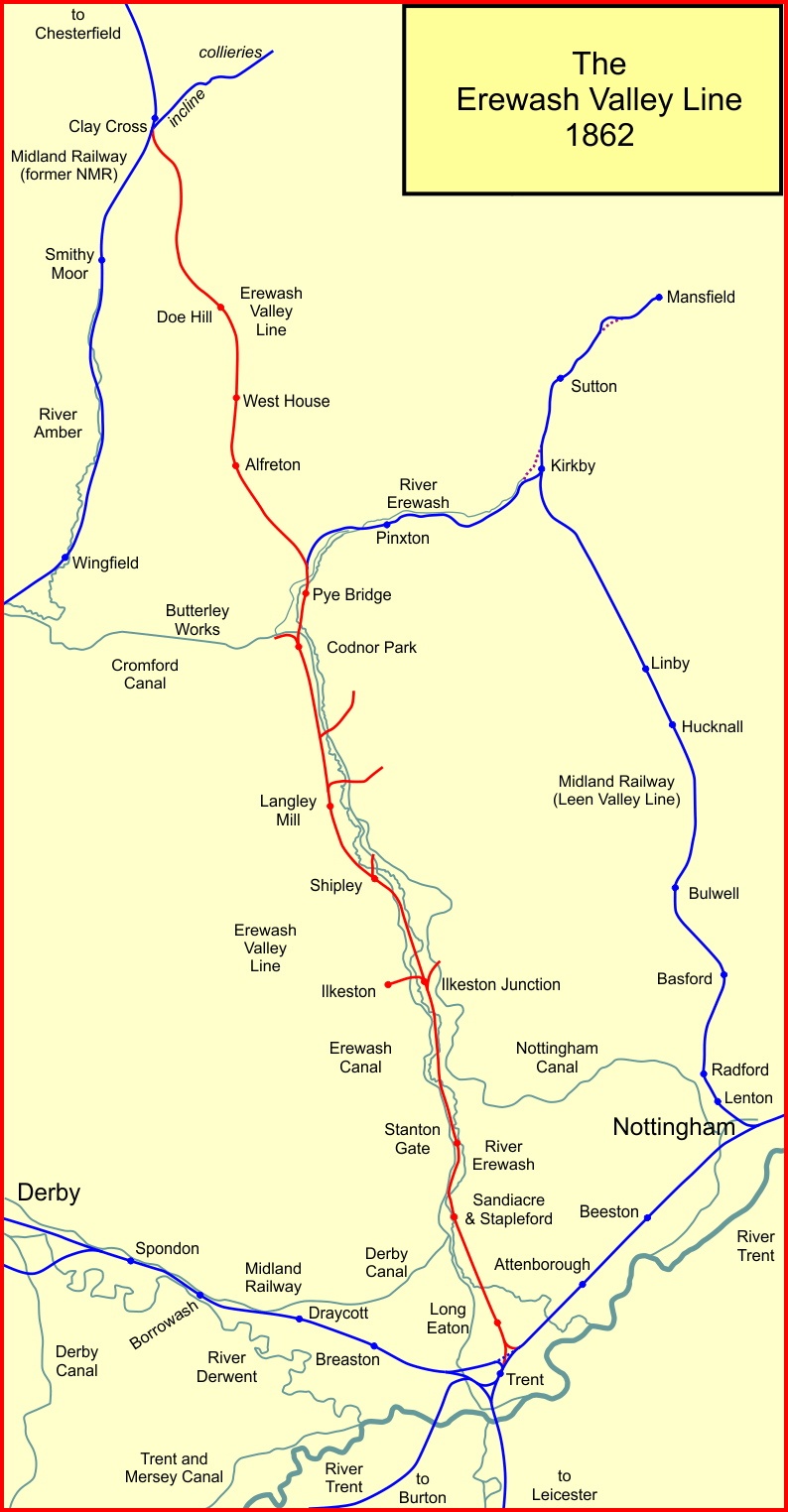
The Erewash Valley Line in 1862

The Pye Bridge – Pinxton – Mansfield line remained the northern limit of the Erewash Valley Line until in November 1861 the Midland Railway opened a line from Pye Bridge to Clay Cross on the former North Midland Railway route south of Chesterfield. At first only goods and mineral trains ran; the section was opened to passengers on 1 May 1862.

== Great Northern Railway ==
The mineral wealth of the Erewash Valley was such that the Great Northern Railway, already established at Colwick, sought to expand westwards. After a false start, the GNR got a scheme authorised in 1872, and its own Pinxton line was begun first to bring it coal traffic. It ran to the east of the Midland's Erewash line, and was opened in August 1875. In the first six months of 1876, the line carried 115,000 tons of coal, which was considered to justify the project. Passenger services began running to Pinxton on 1 August 1876. The GNR line to Derby from near Kimberley on the GNR’s Nottingham to Derby line opened fully on 1 April 1878. It crossed the Erewash Valley on a long lattice viaduct, named Bennerley Viaduct.

== Midland branches from the Erewash Valley Line ==
As well as several short connections to local mines, the Midland Railway built a number of longer branches and connecting lines. A branch from Stanton Gate to Shipley, beyond Ilkeston, was opened in 1870. On 1 May 1875 the Trowell to Radford cut-off was opened to allow quicker access to Nottingham, without the necessity to continue to Long Eaton. The Trowell Line was also seen as a mean of reducing congestion at Toton, by enabling the diversion of mineral trains for the south via Nottingham and Oakham, using the Nottingham Direct Line.

Another diversion was achieved by the opening of the line from Pye Bridge to Ambergate (Crich Junction) on the same day as the Trowell Line. This too was primarily a goods line, to divert the increasingly heavy traffic in meat, grain, fruit and timber from the Americas, imported via Liverpool and other Lancashire ports, away from the congested Ambergate–Derby–Trent line. Already freight from the West Riding was diverted down the Erewash Valley line at Clay Cross, regaining the Birmingham line at Stenson Junction using the Castle Donington line, opened throughout in 1873.

Next was a branch from Bennerley Junction to Kimberley and Watnall on 12 August 1879, where it joined the branch from Basford Junction to Watnall Colliery, opened in 1877. Passenger services over this Kimberley branch began on 1 September 1882. The Midland branch to Heanor ran from Ripley, putting Ripley on a through line. The Ripley–Butterley and Ripley–Heanor lines were opened together on 2 June 1890. The section on to the main Erewash Valley line, and a spur into separate platforms at Langley Mill, were opened on 1 October 1895.

== Expansion at Trent ==
Throughout the final decades of the nineteenth century, sorting siding accommodation at Trent was continually enhanced, as the location became the primary yard for sorting coal wagons from Nottinghamshire and Derbyshire coalfields for southern and eastern destinations, and of course the empty wagons returning. (Note: At this time nearly all the coal wagons were privately owned, and had to be returned to their owners' colliery.)

On the down side of the line, dealing with returning empties, there were five reception roads and seventeen sorting sidings in 1884. Loaded wagons are dealt with on the up side, where in 1884 there were nine reception roads and sixteen sorting sidings. Much shunting was done by horses; about forty were sufficient in summer to handle the 18,000 wagons a month. During the winter about 26,000 wagons were handled a month. Hump working began in 1901, and it considerably speeded wagon sorting. The final addition in 1901 was the high-level goods avoiding line from Toton, with its spur to the Nottingham line at Attenborough Junction. The work included the provision of quadruple track southwards from the Trent Junctions through Red Hill Tunnel and over the River Trent.

In the 1930s a thorough modernisation of both yards was planned, and completed in May 1939 for the down yard. Work on the up yard was interrupted by the war and not completed until 1952. Diesel shunters were then extensively used, and the thirty-five sidings in the down yard could handle nearly 5,000 wagons a day. Actual reconstruction in the down yard was kept to a minimum, but in the up yard sixteen miles of track were completely taken up and replaced with twenty-seven miles, within two years. Four fans of sorting sidings were laid, comprising thirty-seven roads, plus eleven arrival lines and twenty storage roads. These up sidings received up to seventy trains daily in 1952 and despatched sixty; between them, the two yards handled two million wagons a year.

During the 1960s coal traffic declined sharply as oil imports increased and as natural gas replaced town gas. In addition, the eight local power stations were supplied directly from collieries, consuming half of the sixteen million tons of coal produced locally. Ratcliffe-on-Soar Power Station at the south end of Red Hill Tunnel burnt nearly 100,000 tons of coal a week, and was fed continuously by 1,300 ton coal trains on the merry-go-round principle.

== Decline of local passenger services ==
In common with other local passenger services in the greater Nottingham area, the Ilkeston branch was closed to passengers on 16 June 1947. Intermediate stations on the main line were later closed and local passenger trains ceased to operate from 2 January 1967. Mansfield was by this time a very large population centre without a railway station, and on 7 May 1973 a new station on the Erewash Valley main line was opened at Alfreton, named Alfreton and Mansfield Parkway.

== Trent station and north curve ==
Trent station was closed and demolished in January 1968. All the lines that converged at this point remained open, with the exception of the North Curve, which ran from Long Eaton station on the Derby line and curved south to enter the old Trent station from the north. It had occasionally been used to stable the Royal Train overnight when royalty was visiting Nottingham.

== Stations and locations ==
- Trent; opened 1 May 1862; closed 1 January 1968;
  - Long Eaton Junction;
- North Erewash Junction;
- Long Eaton; opened 6 September 1847; renamed Toton for Long Eaton 1 October 1851; renamed Long Eaton 1862; re-sited about 1/4 mile south July 1863; closed 2 January 1967;
- Toton Sidings;
- Sandiacre & Stapleford; opened 6 September 1847; renamed Stapleford and Sandiacre 1884/5; closed 2 January 1967;
- Stanton Gate; opened July 1851; closed 2 January 1967;
- Trowell; opened 2 June 1884; closed 2 January 1967;
- Ilkeston Junction; opened 6 September 1847 on main line as unadvertised exchange; renamed Ilkeston 1870 to 1879, while branch closed; renamed Ilkeston & Cossall 1 December 1890; closed 2 January 1967; new station Ilkeston opened 2 April 2017 on same site.
  - Ilkeston; opened 6 September 1847; closed 2 May 1870; reopened as Ilkeston Town 1 July 1879; closed 16 June 1947;
- Shipley; opened July 1851; renamed Shipley Gate 1 July 1887; closed 29 August 1948;
- Langley Mill; opened 6 September 1847; closed 2 January 1967; reopened 12 May 1986; still open;
- Codnor Park; opened 6 September 1847; renamed Codnor Park & Ironville 17 November 1898; closed 2 January 1967;
- Pye Bridge; opened 1 December 1851; closed 2 January 1967;
- Alfreton; opened 1 May 1862; renamed Alfreton & South Normanton 7 November 1891; closed 2 January 1967; reopened as Alfreton & Mansfield Parkway 7 May 1973; renamed Alfreton 29 May 1994; still open;
- West House; opened May 1862; closed 1 August 1865;
- Doe Hill; opened 1 May 1862; closed 12 September 1960;
- Clay Cross Junction;
- Clay Cross; opened by North Midland Railway 6 April 1841; closed 2 January 1967.
