= Alfred Mundy =

Australian politician

Alfred Miller Mundy JP DL (9 January 1809 – 29 March 1877) was an English military officer in colonial New South Wales, who after leaving the army served in the Legislative Council of South Australia, from 15 June 1843 to 14 May 1849.

== Early life ==
Alfred Miller Mundy was born on 9 January 1809 in Derbyshire. He was the third son of Edward Miller Mundy (d. 1834) and his wife Nelly Mundy (née Barton). Edward was the owner of the manor of Shipley in Derbyshire, having succeeded his father and namesake to his estate in 1822. His elder brother was Edward Miller Mundy. His younger half-brother, Sir Robert Miller Mundy (1813–1892), was Lieutenant-Governor of Grenada.

Alfred's paternal grandfather, Edward Miller Mundy, was the first of the Miller Mundys to own the manor of Shipley, having inherited it through his mother Hester Mundy (née Miller) on the condition that he take the name Miller. He was also the Tory MP for the constituency of Derbyshire.

The Miller Mundys were descended from the Mundys of Allestree, who were a cadet branch of the Mundys of Markeaton. As such, Alfred was a direct male-line descendant of Sir John Mundy, who had first purchased the manors of Markeaton (the principal seat of the Mundy family), Allestree and Mackworth from Lord Audley in 1516 and became Lord Mayor of London in 1522.

== Career ==
Alfred enlisted in the army and was stationed in Sydney in November 1827 when he was promoted to Second Lieutenant, 94th Regiment of Foot, later promoted to Lieutenant, 21st Regiment of Foot. He was appointed a Magistrate in Tasmania in March 1835 and as Justice of the Peace in 1837. He resigned his commission in 1839, but was later commonly referred to as "Lieutenant Mundy".

On 11 July 1839 Mundy, John Bourke and Joseph Hawdon set out from Melbourne for Adelaide, Mundy and Bourke on a light tandem and Hawdon on horseback, following the route taken by Charles Bonney via Portland Bay and the Glenelg River. They arrived in Adelaide exactly a month later, and estimated it could easily be done in half that time.

He joined with Edward Bate Scott and Edward John Eyre, who had a scheme to purchase and transport livestock from Adelaide to the Swan River Colony (now Perth), aboard chartered ships as far as King George's Sound (then the only deepwater harbor in Western Australia) and then drive them overland to Perth. On 30 January 1840 they loaded some stock onto the schooner Minerva and a few days later the remainder onto the barque Cleveland. Eyre sailed aboard Minerva while Mundy was aboard the Cleveland. The stock consisted of 1700 sheep, which included over 1000 ewes and 450 lambs, 6 horses and 100 cattle. They achieved good prices in Perth, and would have made a tidy profit except many sheep and cattle died on the track in Western Australia, ascribed to their eating poisonous plants. On 3 April 1840 Eyre and Mundy were elected honorary members of the W.A. Agricultural Society. They arrived back in Adelaide aboard Minerva in May 1840.

Mundy was appointed acting Clerk of (the Legislative) Council in June 1840 and Private Secretary to the newly appointed Governor Grey in May 1841.

He was appointed by the Governor to the Legislative Council on 15 June 1843, originally as a non-official appointee, then as Colonial Secretary from 15 June 1848 to 14 June 1849 when he returned to England on leave of absence. His brother Edward Miller Mundy, who was M.P. for the constituency of South Derbyshire had died childless on 29 January 1849 and Alfred resigned on succeeding to the family estate, which included lucrative coal mines. He was Sheriff of Derbyshire in 1855, and a Justice of the Peace and Deputy Lieutenant for that county and a Justice of the Peace for Nottinghamshire.

== Personal life ==
On 5 June 1841 in Australia, Mundy was married to Jane Hindmarsh (1814–1874). Jane was the eldest daughter of John Hindmarsh. Together, they had three children:

- Maria Jane Miller Mundy (d. 1902), who married the English diplomat Sir Edmund Constantine Henry Phipps (the grandson of Henry Phipps, 1st Earl of Mulgrave).
- Nelly Hindmarsh Miller Mundy (1844–1912), who married Charles John Addington in 1862.
- Alfred Edward Miller Mundy (1849–1920), who married Ellen Mary Palmer-Morewood of Alfreton Hall. They divorced in 1881 when she deserted him for the young Charles Chetwynd-Talbot, 20th Earl of Shrewsbury.

He died on 30 March 1877 while on holiday in Nice.

=== Descendants ===
Through his daughter Maria, he was a grandfather of the diplomat Sir Eric Clare Edmund Phipps.

== Recognition ==
- Mundy Creek, which flows into Lake Eyre South, was named for him by Eyre on 25 August 1840.
- Lake Mundy in Victoria was named for him by Joseph Holloway in September 1839.
- Mundy Terrace in Robe was named for him.
