= Newport Pagnell Canal =

Canal in Buckinghamshire

Coordinates: 52.0789°N 0.7451°W

Newport Pagnall Canal
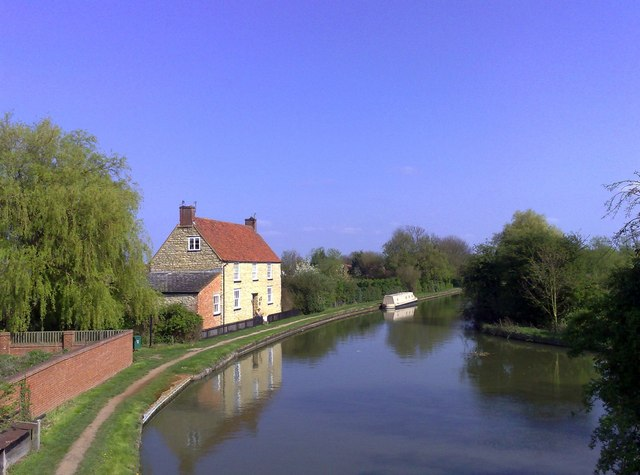
- The Wharf at Great Linford. The canal passed between the building and the wall on the left.

Specifications
- Length: 1.25 miles (2.01 km)
- Maximum boat length: 72 ft 0 in (21.95 m)
- Maximum boat beam: 7 ft 0 in (2.13 m)
- Locks: 7
- Status: Used for railway (now dismantled)

History
- Date of act: 1814
- Date of first use: 1817
- Date closed: 1864

Geography
- Start point: Great Linford
- End point: Newport Pagnell
- Connects to: Grand Union Canal

The Newport Pagnell Canal was a 1.25 mile canal in Buckinghamshire that ran from the Grand Junction Canal at Great Linford to Newport Pagnell through seven locks. Construction was authorised by an act of Parliament in June 1814 and it probably opened in 1817. It closed in 1864, with part of the route used for the line of a railway.

== History ==
The Grand Junction Canal was planned in 1791, to provide a direct link between Braunston on the Oxford Canal and London. This led to a flurry of canal proposals in 1792 and 1793, all based on the assumption that the Grand Junction would be built. The route was authorised by the Grand Junction Canal Act 1793 (33 Geo. 3. c. 80) which was obtained on 30 April 1793, and the first proposal for a branch from it to Newport Pagnell was made in that year. James Barnes, who had made the first survey for the Grand Junction, also carried out a survey for the Newport Pagnell branch, but the committee for the main canal declined to build it once they had read the report.

Newport Pagnell Canal Act 1814
- Act of Parliament
- Parliament of the United Kingdom
- Long title: An Act for making and maintaining a Navigable Canal from Newport Pagnell to The Grand Junction Canal, at Great Linford, in the County of Buckingham.
- Citation: 54 Geo. 3. c. xcviii

Dates
- Royal assent: 17 June 1814

Other legislation
- Repealed by: Newport Pagnell Railway Act 1863

Status: Repealed

Text of statute as originally enacted

On 2 January 1813, a meeting was held at the Swan Inn in Newport Pagnell, which proposed the building of a canal, using the original powers of the Grand Junction Canal, or the construction of a railway along a similar route, which would have required an act of Parliament. The Grand Junction Canal again refused to construct the branch, and the idea of a railway was dropped. Instead, a meeting held on 20 August 1813 decided to apply for an act of Parliament to authorise the branch, and the Newport Pagnell Canal Act 1814 (54 Geo. 3. c. xcviii) was granted in June 1814. The route was surveyed by Benjamin Beven, who was working for the Grand Junction Canal, and work began in early 1815. The canal took two years to build and opened in early 1817. It was 1.25 miles (2.0 km) long, and the level fell by 50.75 feet (15.47 m) through seven locks as it ran from Great Linford to Newport Pagnell. Although the Grand Junction was built for wide-beam boats, the locks were built to the same dimensions as those on the Northampton Branch, and were 72 by 7 feet (21.9 by 2.1 m).

The cost of the project was around £14,200, which included ornamentation where the canal passed through ground belonging to the Rev. W. Uthwatt. The main cargo was coal, brought from Shipley on the Nutbrook Canal and Moira on the Ashby Canal for sale in Newport Pagnelll and the surrounding region. This accounted for some 7,500 tons per year, and another 2,500 tons were made up of lime, manure, bricks and other cargos. Tolls were very high, and were still being maintained at 9 pence (4p) for the length of the canal when tolls on the neighbouring Grand Junction were less than 1 penny (0.4p) per mile. This allowed dividends to be paid throughout the life of the canal, which averaged 2.7 per cent, but reached 6 per cent in 1845, the year in which the canal carried its greatest volume of 14,887 tons.

== Expansion ==
While the canal was being promoted, the committee had in mind that it might be possible to extend the canal to Olney, and to connect to the River Great Ouse by building a link to Bedford. Once the canal was opened, a survey was commissioned by Lord St. John. This proposed a canal for 20-ton boats, from Newport Pagnell via Tyringham, Sharnbrook and St Neots, where it would join the Ouse. The proposal also included a branch to Kimbolton, but no further action was taken. The idea of a link between the canal and the upper Ouse was revived in 1838, but again, no action was taken.

== Decline ==
In 1845 an approach was made to buy the canal by the London and North Western Railway. The offer was turned down but in 1862 the canal was sold to the Newport Pagnell Railway for £9,000, despite opposition from the Grand Junction, the Oxford Canal, and the collieries at Moira and Shipley. An act of Parliament authorising the takeover, the Newport Pagnell Railway Act 1863 (26 & 27 Vict. c. cx), was obtained; the canal closed in August 1864, and it was partially built upon by the railway. At Newport Pagnell, the railway re-used several of the warehouses and most of Shipley Wharf.

== Route ==
The canal left the Grand Junction Canal just to the east of Linford Wharf Bridge, and ran along a relatively straight course eastwards to Newport Pagnell. The locks appear to have been the main engineering features, as there were no significant roads which crossed the course. Although the 1881 Ordnance Survey map shows the railway, rather than the canal, there were no crossings, and this remained the case in 1925. Even today, there are only two routes which cross the path of the canal. The first is the M1 motorway, which was built while the railway was still open, while Brickhill Street was not built until after the railway had closed. The two lock pounds immediately below Great Linford Wharf were depicted on Ordnance Survey maps until 1968, but disappeared after that.

The location at which the canal joined the Grand Junction Canal, which has been part of the Grand Union Canal since amalgamation in 1929, is marked by a large winding hole close to Linford Wharf Bridge. A pub at the entrance to the canal was popular among boatmen until it closed in the 1960s. A section of the Newport Pagnell basin wall was discovered during the redevelopment of the railway station site.

== Bibliography ==
- Chaplin, Tom (1989). Narrow Boats. Whittet Books. ISBN 0-905483-71-5.
- Cumberlidge, Jane (2009). Inland Waterways of Great Britain (8th Ed.). Imray Laurie Norie and Wilson. ISBN 978-1-84623-010-3.
- Gourlay, Jill (1996). "Remnants of the Newport Pagnell Canal". Buckingham Canal Society. Archived from the original on 21 April 2012.
- Hadfield, Charles (1970). The Canals of the East Midlands (2nd Ed.). David & Charles. ISBN 978-0-7153-4871-0.
- Nicholson (2006). Nicholson Guides Vol 1: Grand Union, Oxford and the South East. Harper Collins. ISBN 978-0-00-721109-8.

== See also ==
- Canals of the United Kingdom
