= Listed buildings in Trowell =

Trowell is a civil parish in the Borough of Broxtowe, Nottinghamshire, England. The parish contains nine listed buildings that are recorded in the National Heritage List for England. Of these, one is listed at Grade II*, the middle of the three grades, and the others are at Grade II, the lowest grade. The parish contains the village of Trowell and the surrounding countryside. The Nottingham Canal passes through the parish, and two bridges crossing it are listed. The other listed buildings consist of a church, a country house, smaller houses and associated structures, and a farmhouse and farm buildings.

== Key ==
Grade	Criteria
II*	Particularly important buildings of more than special interest
II	Buildings of national importance and special interest

== Buildings ==
Name and location	Photograph	Date	Notes	Grade
St Helen's Church; 52.95295°N 1.28148°W		13th century	The church has been altered and extended through the centuries, including restorations in 1836, and in 1890 by C. Hodgson Fowler. It is built in stone with roofs of slate and felt, and consists of a nave with a clerestory, north and south aisles, a south porch, a chancel and a west tower. The tower has two stages, corner buttresses, a moulded string course, moulded eaves, and an embattled parapet. In the south side is a doorway, there is a triple lancet window on the west side, on the north side is a clock face, and on all sides are arched bell openings with a continuous hood mould.	II*
Rectory Farmhouse and wall 52.95270°N 1.28205°W		Late 17th century	The farmhouse is in brick, partly rendered, with floor bands, dentilled eaves, and a slate roof with coped gables. There are two storeys and attics, and an L-shaped plan, with a front range of five bays, the left bay a gabled cross wing, and two-storey extensions at the rear. The windows are a mix of sashes and casements, those on the ground floor at the front with splayed lintels and keystones. In the attic are three dormers, the outer ones with gabled pediments, and the middle one with a half-round pediment. The boundary wall is in brick with chamfered stone coping, and extends for about 60 metres (200 ft).	II
Barn, stables and pigsty, Rectory Farm; 52.95207°N 1.28176°W	—	Mid 18th century	The buildings are in brick, with moulded eaves, and pantile roofs with plain tile verges. There is a single storey and an L-shaped plan, with a main range of ten bays. The barn has seven bays, and contains doors, one with a segmental head, casement windows and a loading door. The stable to the south has three doors, two casement windows with segmental heads and three round-headed openings, and the pigsty to the west has two doorways, feeding hatches and a cart opening.	II
4 Nottingham Road; 52.95311°N 1.28106°W		Late 18th century	A farmhouse, later a private house, in brick on a partial plinth, with a cogged floor band, dentilled eaves and a pantile roof. There are two storeys, a basement and attics, and an L-shaped plan, with a front range of three bays, and a rear wing. The central doorway has a fanlight, and most of the windows are casements, those on the front with segmental heads, and there is one horizontally-sliding sash window. On the east side is a door to the cellar and a lean-to corner porch.	II
Stables at 4 Nottingham Road; 52.95304°N 1.28077°W	—	Late 18th century	The stables, later garages, are in brick, with dentilled eaves, and a pantile roof with plain tile verges and coped gables. The building is in one and two storeys, and has five bays. It contains a door, two pairs of garage doors, a hatch and casement windows; most openings have segmental heads.	II
53 Nottingham Road; 52.95587°N 1.27732°W	—	Late 18th century	A pair of cottages combined into a house, it is in brick, and has a pantile roof with coped gables. There are two storeys and three bays. On the front is a gabled porch, to the right is a blocked doorway, and the windows are casements.	II
Swancar Bridge; 52.94857°N 1.26090°W		c. 1795	An accommodation bridge over the Nottingham Canal, it is in stone, and consists of a single elliptical arch. The bridge has a plain string course, and a curved parapet with half-round coping, ending in small piers.	II
Swansea Bridge; 52.95031°N 1.27168°W		c. 1795	A footbridge over the Nottingham Canal, it is in stone, and consists of a single elliptical arch. The bridge has a plain string course, and a curved parapet with half-round coping, ending in small piers.	II
Trowell Hall, cottage and wall 52.95473°N 1.26510°W	—	c. 1880	A country house in Jacobethan style, in brick on a chamfered plinth, with stone dressings, two moulded string courses, and slate roofs with coped and moulded parapets and shaped gables. There are two storeys, a double-depth T-shaped plan, and a front range of five bays. The windows are cross and mullioned casements, and there are two oriel windows, canted bay windows and gabled dormers. To the right of the north front is an octagonal two-stage tower containing a Tudor arched doorway, and surmounted by an ogee lead roof with a weathervane. The courtyard contains a wash house, storage rooms, and a pyramidal-roofed game larder, and the garden wall is in stone with flat slab coping and has a projecting ramped section.	II
