= Robert Miller Mundy =

British soldier and civil servant (1813-1892)

Sir Robert Miller Mundy KCMG
- Born: 1813; Shipley, Derbyshire, England
- Died: March 22, 1892 (aged 78–79); Emsworth, Hampshire, England
- Spouse: Isabella Popham
- Children: Maria Georgiana Mundy (d. 25 Apr 1876); Millicent Mundy (d. 9 Jan 1908)
- Parent: Edward Miller Mundy

Sir Robert Miller Mundy KCMG (1813–1892) was a British soldier and colonial civil servant. He was the lieutenant-governor of Grenada.

== Biography ==
Robert Miller Mundy was born in Shipley Hall. Mundy was the son of Edward Miller Mundy, and his third wife Catherine Coffin, widow of Richard Barwell. His father was a Member of Parliament for Derbyshire from 1784 until his death in 1822; his nephew, Edward Miller Mundy, held the same seat in 1841-1849.

He trained at Woolwich and by 1833 he was a lieutenant in the Royal Artillery. In March 1841 he joined the horse artillery, and became a second captain in April 1844, and major by brevet on selling out in October 1846. After a country life in Hampshire for some years, he volunteered to serve in the Turkish army during the Crimean War and became a lieutenant-colonel in the Osmanli horse artillery until August 1856. He received the medal of the third class of Medjidié.

In September 1863 he was appointed lieutenant-governor of Grenada in the Caribbean and started his colonial career. He was Governor of the Windward Islands in 1865 and of British Guiana from May 1866 to September 1867. He returned to the Windwards Islands in 1868-69 and then looked after the Leeward Islands in 1871. From Grenada he was transferred in February 1874 to the permanent appointment of lieutenant-governor of British Honduras, and retired in 1877.

Created CMG in 1874, and KCMG in 1877, he settled in Hampshire, and died at Hollybank, Emsworth, Hampshire, on 22 March 1892. He married in 1841 Isabella Popham of Littlecott, Wiltshire who survived him.
