= Edward Miller Mundy =

Edward Miller Mundy may refer to:

- Edward Miller Mundy (1750–1822), MP for Derbyshire 1784–1822
- Edward Miller Mundy (1800–1849), MP for South Derbyshire 1841–49
