= Listed buildings in Shipley, Derbyshire =

Shipley is a civil parish in the Amber Valley district of Derbyshire, England. The parish contains twelve listed buildings that are recorded in the National Heritage List for England. Of these, one is listed at Grade II*, the middle of the three grades, and the others are at Grade II, the lowest grade. The parish contains the village of Shipley and the surrounding area. The most important building in the parish was Shipley Hall, but this was demolished in 1948. A number of buildings in its grounds are listed, including a model farm, a former water tower, a house, and two lodges with their associated gateways. The Erewash Canal passes through the parish and the listed buildings associated with it are a bridge, a lock and a cottage. The other listed buildings are two road bridges to the south of Shipley Lake.

== Key ==
Grade	Criteria
II*	Particularly important buildings of more than special interest
II	Buildings of national importance and special interest

== Buildings ==
Name and location	Photograph	Date	Notes	Grade
Colliery Road Bridge; 52.99047°N 1.33689°W		Late 18th century	The road bridge to the south of Shipley Reservoir is in sandstone with brick under the arch. It consists of a single semicircular arch with rusticated voussoirs, on raised impost locks, on a stone base. Above is a plain band and parapets.	II
Paul's Arm Bridge; 52.99033°N 1.33945°W		Late 18th century	The road bridge to the south of Shipley Reservoir is in sandstone and brick. It consists of two semicircular arches with rusticated voussoirs, and a central pier with triangular cutwaters. Above the arch is a plain band and parapets, and the side walls curve outwards and end in square piers.	II
The Cottage, Shipley Gate Lock; 53.00353°N 1.31193°W		Late 18th century	A pair of cottages combined into one, it is in rendered brick with a pantile roof. There are two storeys, two bays, a gabled projection to the east, and a lean-to south porch. The cottage contains a segmental-headed opening and sash windows, one of which is horizontally-sliding.	II
Canal bridge at Shipley Gate; 53.00349°N 1.31217°W		1779	The bridge carries Long Lane over the Erewash Canal. It is in red brick with stone copings, and consists of a single low segmental arch. The bridge has low brick parapets, and the side walls splay outwards and end in square brick piers.	II
Lock, lock gates and basin at Shipley Gate; 53.00362°N 1.31250°W		1779	The lock on the Erewash Canal has a basin in sandstone and red brick with stone copings, and the gates are in wood and reinforced in metal. The gates have wooden balance beams with metal handrails and rack and pinion mechanisms to either side, there are semi-circular footholds, and on the sides are bollards. On the north side is a metal ladder.	II
Home Farmhouse and farm buildings 52.99393°N 1.35147°W		1860–61	A model farm designed by W. E. Nesfield for the former Shipley Hall. The buildings are in red brick with sandstone dressings, bands in sandstone and buff brick, plinths with blue brick copings, tile roofs with geometric designs in red tiles and blue tile banding, and crested ridge tiles. The farmhouse has a single storey and attics, and a square tower at the northeast corner. The farm buildings include an octagonal dairy, a north range of pigsties and cowsheds, and a west range of stables with a large central carriage arch, at the south end of which is a circular dovecote with a conical roof and a sunburst finial.	II*
The Gardens; 52.99353°N 1.35224°W		1882	A house, later offices, in red brick with stone dressings, quoins, and floor bands. The upper floor is jettied and timber framed with brick nogging, and with plaster infill in the gables. The roof is tiled, with overhanging eaves and gables with bargeboards. There are two storeys and fronts of two bays. The east front has two gables and contains a bow window. In the west gable is a plaster plaque with a crest, initials and the date. Most of the windows are mullioned and have four-centred arched lights and incised spandrels. On the south front is an open gabled porch with a four-centred arch on octagonal piers and carved spandrels, and a doorway with a four-centred arched head.	II
Former water tower 52.99368°N 1.35092°W		1892	The water tower, later used for other purposes, is in the grounds of the former Shipley Hall, and was extended in about 1920. The original tower is octagonal, in stone, with four storeys, quoins, a coped plinth, a moulded eaves band, and a moulded cornice. The extension is circular with five storeys, in red brick, with brown brick sawtooth bands between the storeys, and with a conical wooden roof. Between the towers are glazed wooden screens. In the east front of the original tower are mullioned windows with semicircular-headed lights, and a stone plaque with a crest, initials and the date, and in the north front is a doorway.	II
Derby Lodge; 52.99570°N 1.35212°W		c. 1903	A lodge to the former Shipley Hall, which was designed by Walter Tapper in Tudor style, is in sandstone, and has a stone slate cruciform roof with chamfered stone gable copings on plain kneelers. There is a single storey and attics, and a square plan with a single gabled bay on each side. On each corner is a semicircular arch with a moulded arch. In the eastern arch is a doorway with a moulded surround, and the windows are mullioned. The western gable contains a plaque with a rusticated surround containing a coat of arms, and in the other gables are ventilation slits.	II
Western gatepiers and walls, Derby Lodge; 52.99567°N 1.35225°W		c. 1903	The gate piers and walls, designed by Walter Tapper, are in sandstone. The central piers are square, about 15 feet (4.6 m) high, and each pier has a moulded base and cornice, inset panels on the east and west sides, broad pilaster strips with scrolled tops on the north and south sides, and a ball finial. They are flanked by similar smaller piers, and between them are pairs of wooden gates. Attached to the smaller piers are stone coped walls which curve and end in square piers, and there are further sections of walls beyond.	II
Nottingham Lodge; 52.99415°N 1.34599°W		c. 1903	A lodge to the former Shipley Hall, which was designed by Walter Tapper in Tudor style, is in sandstone, and has a stone slate cruciform roof with chamfered stone gable copings on plain kneelers. There is a single storey and attics, and a square plan with a single gabled bay on each side. On each corner is a semicircular arch with a moulded arch. In the western arch is a doorway with a moulded surround, and the windows are mullioned. The western gable contains a plaque with a rusticated surround containing a coat of arms, and in the other gables are ventilation slits.	II
Gatepiers and wall, Nottingham Lodge; 52.99430°N 1.34591°W		c. 1903	The gate piers and walls, designed by Walter Tapper, are in sandstone. The piers are tall and square, and each pier has a moulded base and cornice, broad pilasters on the sides with scrolled tops, and a ball finial, and between them are wooden gates. The walls have stone copings, and curve in a semicircle, with smaller square piers at the ends, and there are further sections of walls beyond.	II
