= Hollybank House, Emsworth =

Building in Emsworth, Hampshire, England

Coordinates: 50.8678°N 0.9395°W

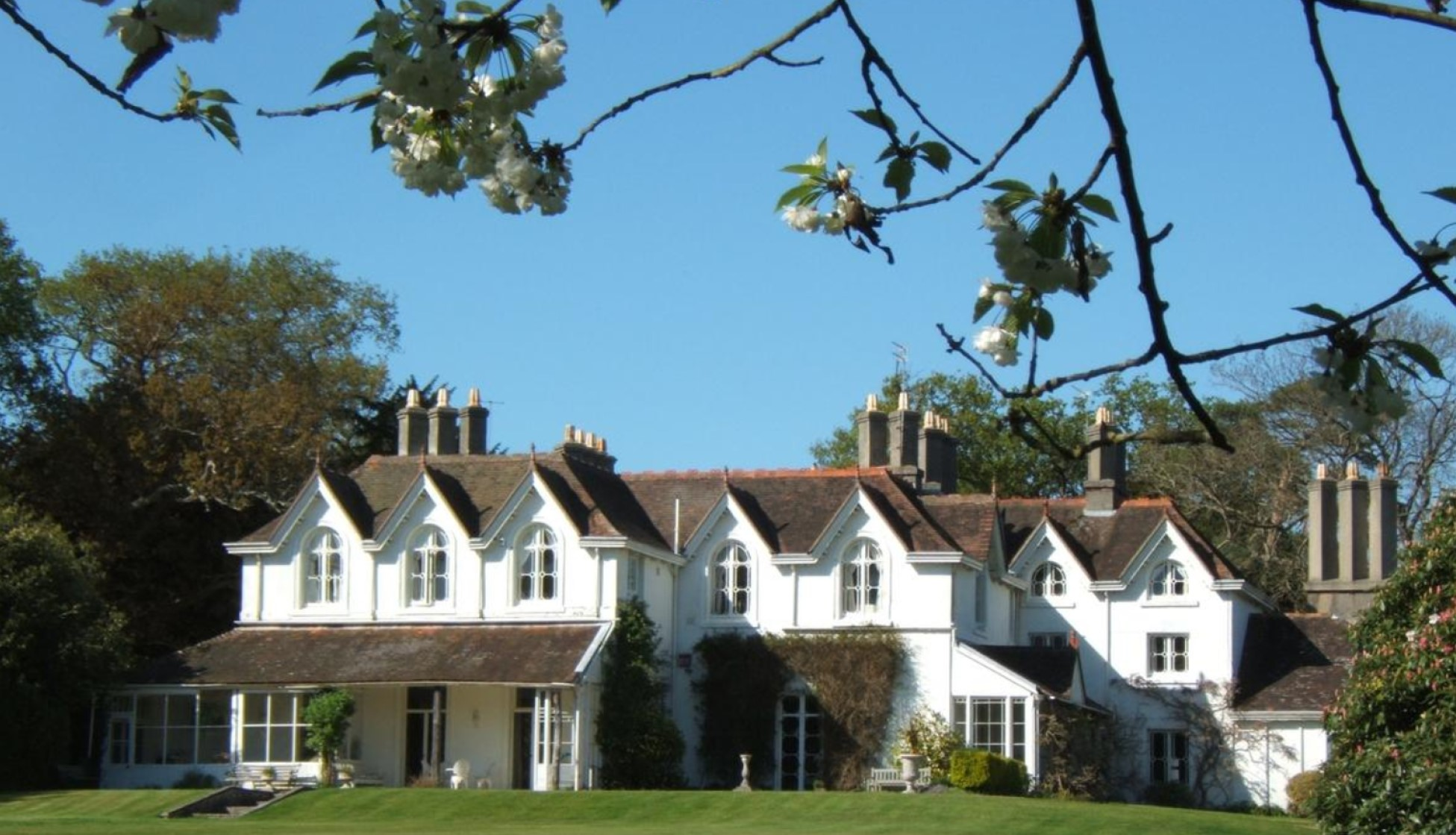
Hollybank House

Hollybank House near Emsworth in Hampshire, England, is a building of historical significance and is Grade II listed on the English Heritage Register. It was built in about 1825 and was home to many notable residents over the next two centuries. Today it is a Country House B&B and caters for special events including weddings.

== Early residents ==
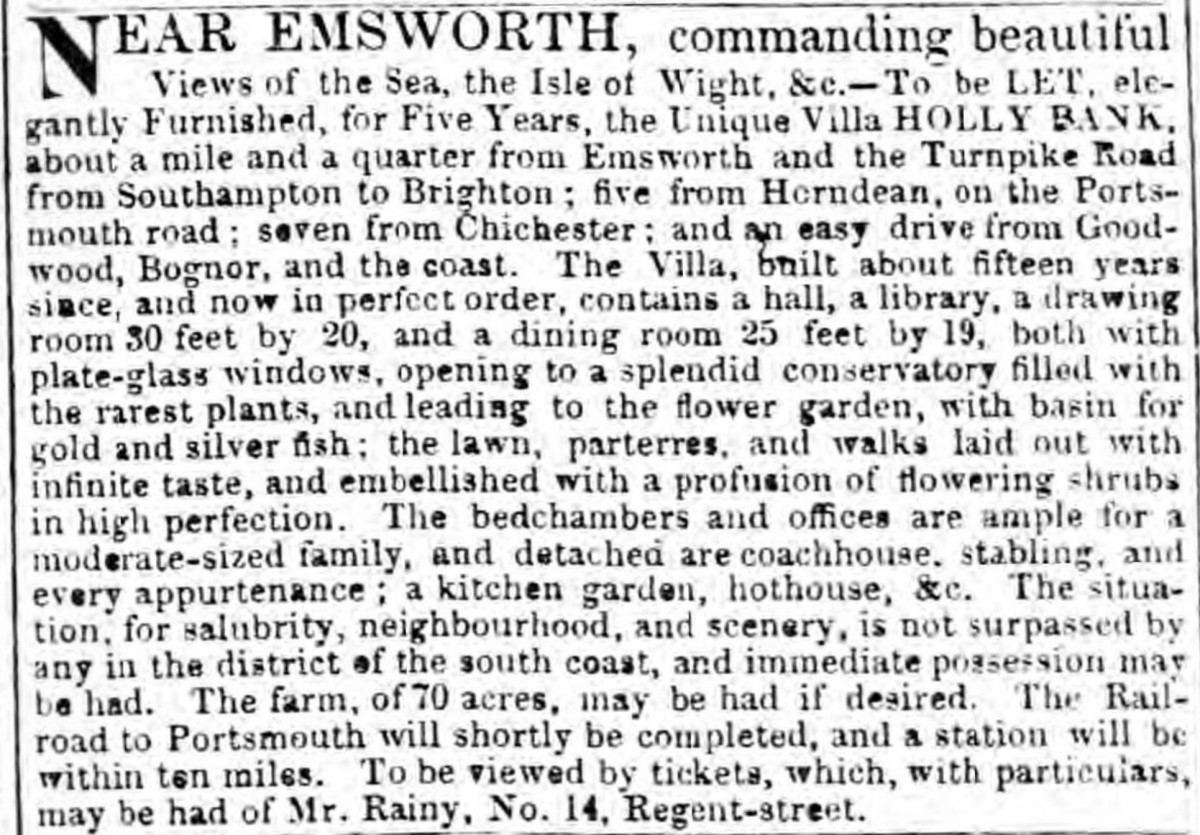
Rental notice for Hollybank House in 1841

It appears that Catherine Mundy built Hollybank House in 1825. The Tithe Map of 1838 shows that she is the owner and also the occupier of the property at this time. In addition, an advertisement for an adjoining estate in 1832 makes the following observations:

"This estate is in the immediate neighbourhood of Westbourn and adjoins Hollybank, the highly ornamented and deservedly admired property and residence of Mrs Catherine Mundy".

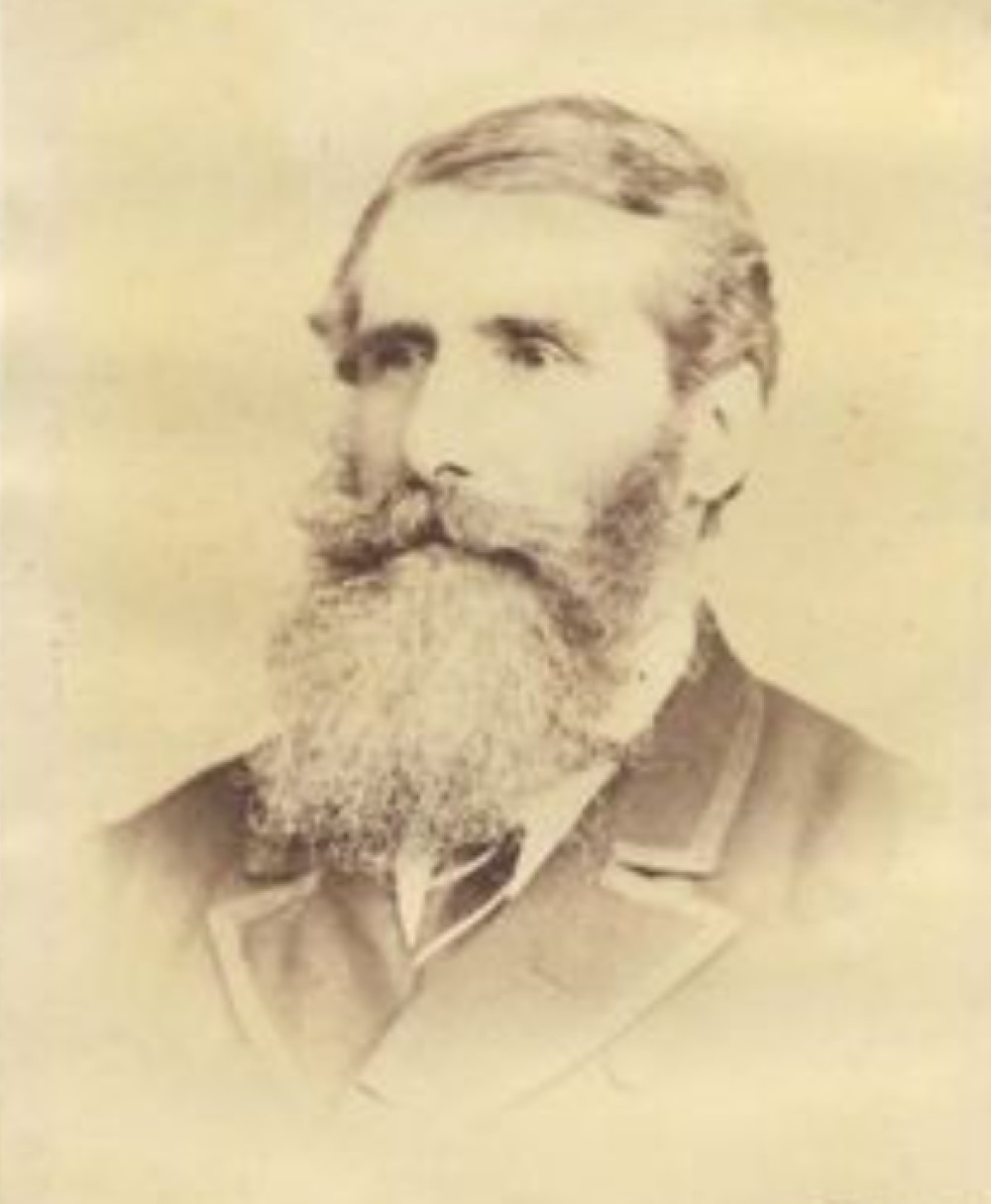
Sir Robert Miller Mundy

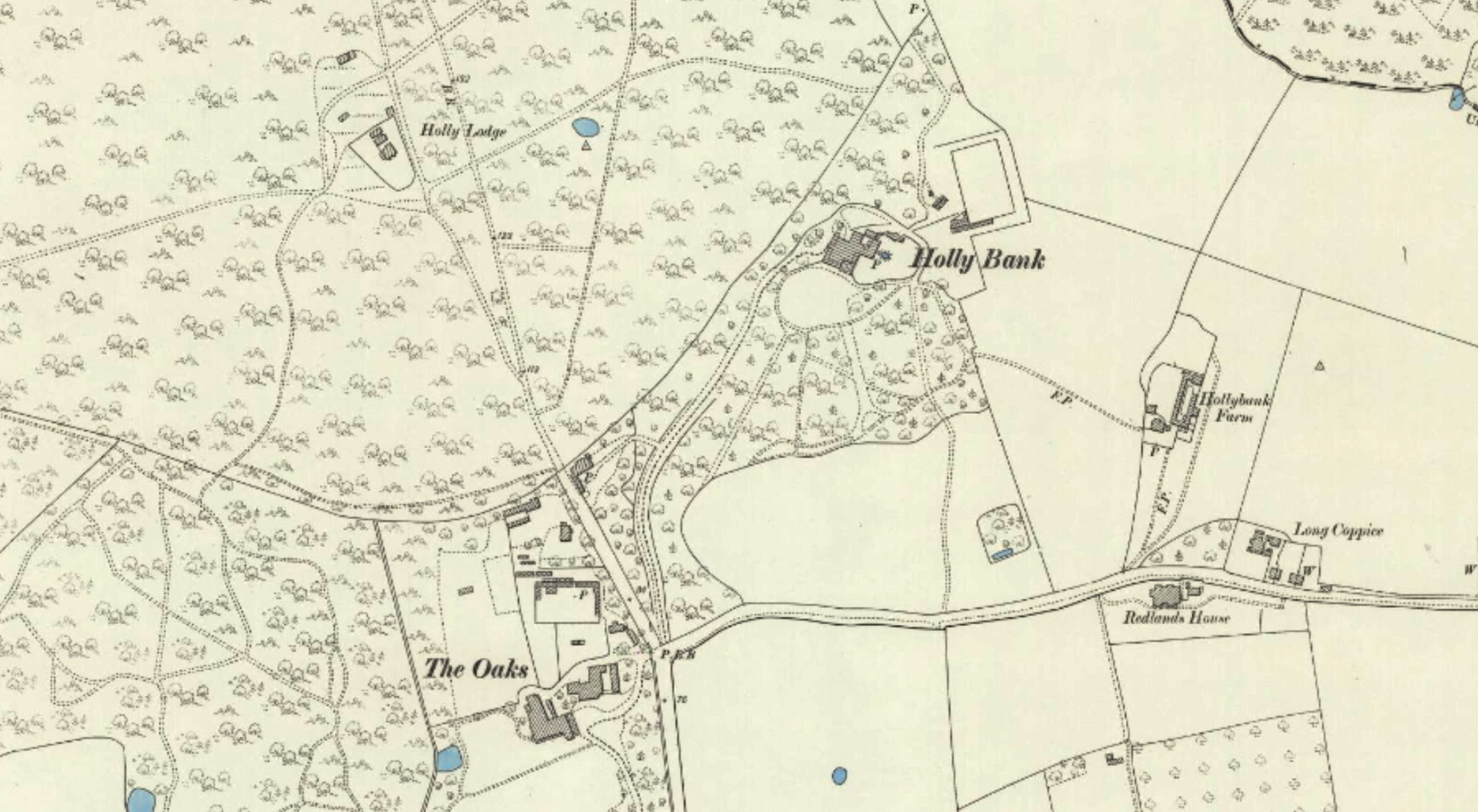
Map of Hollybank HOuse 1898

Catherine (nee Coffin) was born in Boston, Massachusetts in 1769. She was the sister of Sir Isaac Coffin. She married twice. Her first husband was Richard Barwell, a trader in the East India Company who amassed a large fortune. He died in 1804 and in 1811 Catherine married Edward Miller Mundy of Shipley Hall. Two years later the couple had one son Robert Miller Mundy.

Edward her second husband, died in 1822 and it may be at about this time that Catherine decided to build her own house. She lived there for about 15 years then in 1841 she placed a rental notice in the newspaper which is shown. The house was described in the following terms.

"The villa now in perfect order contains a hall, a library, a drawing room 30 feet by 20 and a dining room 25 feet by 19, both with plate glass windows, opening to a splendid conservatory filled with the rarest plants and leading to the flower garden with basin for gold and silver fish. The lawn parterres and walks laid out with infinite taste and embellished with a profusion of flowering shrubs in high perfection."

Catherine died in 1847. There is a memorial window in her honour in St John the Baptist's Church, Westbourne. Her son Sir Robert Miller Mundy (1813-1892) inherited the house. He and his family lived at Hollybank House for the next sixty years. In 1841 he married Isabella Leyborne Popham who was the daughter of General Edward William Leyborne Popham. The couple had ten children – nine daughters and one son. In 1863 he was appointed Lieutenant Governor of Grenada and the house was rented for many years. The advertisement for this is shown. During this time Rear Admiral the Honourable Thomas Alexander Pakenham was the tenant. He was the 3rd son of the 2nd Earl of Longford. His wife who he married in 1853 was Sophia Frances Sykes who was the daughter of Sir Tatton Sykes. The couple are recorded in the 1871 Census as living at Hollybank House with four of their children, a housekeeper, a butler, a footman, a ladies’ maid, and four maids.

After his retirement in 1877 Sir Robert Miller Mundy returned to Hollybank House. The 1881 Census shows the couple living there with two daughters and five servants. Robert died in 1892 and his wife Isabella and unmarried daughter Eleanor continued to live there until Isabella’s death in 1906. In 1907 the house was sold and the advertisement for the sale is shown at this reference.

== Later residents ==
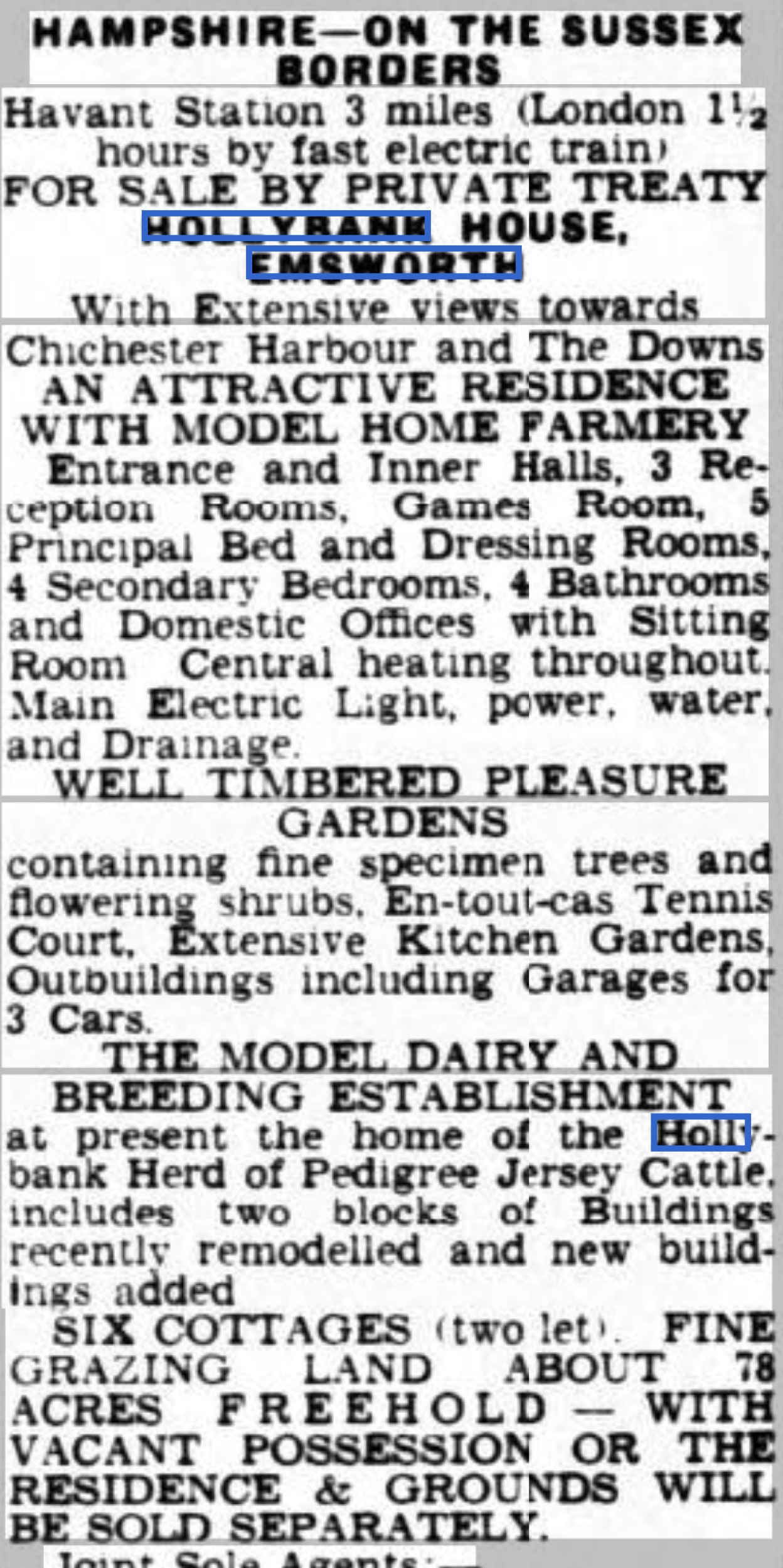
Sale notice for Hollybank House 1950

In 1911 Frank John Roig lived at Hollybank House. It was sold again in 1921 By about 1930 Charles Robert Salusbury Payne (1859–1942) owned the property. He was the son of Salusbury Payne, and became a naval officer. In 1893 he married Aline Cecilia Murray and the couple had two daughters. They are shown in the 1939 Census as living at Hollybank House with their unmarried daughter Phyllis. Charles died in 1942 and the house was sold the following year to Owen Radclyffe Guard (1900–1976) who was a company director but during his residency at Hollybank he developed a herd of pedigree Jersey cows. From about 1952 until 1972 Brigadier Terence Hugh Clarke, CBE (1904-1992) CBE lived at the house. He was the Conservative Member for Portsmouth West during much of this time.
