= Nutbrook Canal =

Defunct canal in Derbyshire, England

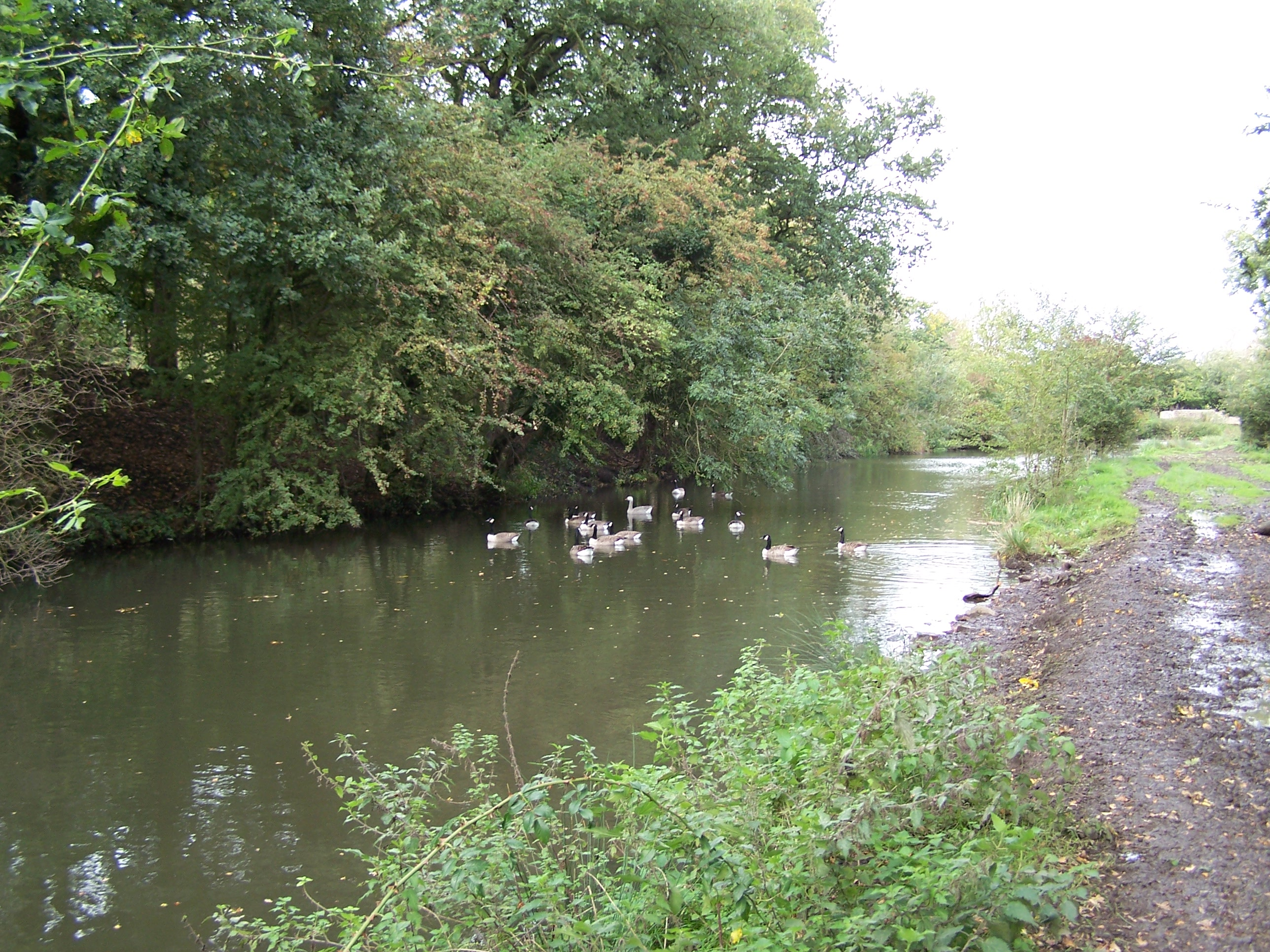
- Parts of the canal still have water in 2006

Specifications
- Maximum boat length: 73 ft 0 in (22.25 m)
- Maximum boat beam: 14 ft 3 in (4.34 m)
- Locks: 13
- Status: Derelict

History
- Original owner: Nutbrook Canal Proprietors
- Principal engineer: Benjamin Outram
- Date of act: 1793
- Date completed: 1796
- Date closed: 1949

Geography
- Start point: Shipley
- End point: Trowell
- Connects to: Erewash Canal

The Nutbrook Canal was a canal in England which ran between Shipley in Derbyshire and the Erewash Canal, joining it near Trowell. It was built to serve the collieries at Shipley and West Hallam, and was completed in 1796. It was initially profitable, but from 1846 faced competition from the railways, and more seriously, subsidence caused by the coal mines that it was built to serve. With the mines failing to pay tolls for goods carried on the canal, and in some cases refusing to accept responsibility for the subsidence, most of it was closed in 1895, although the final 1.5 miles (2.4 km) remained in use until 1949.

== History ==
The part of Derbyshire through which the Nutbrook Canal was built is remote, and although there were collieries at West Hallam and Shipley, it was poorly served by transport links. The construction of the Ilkeston to Nottingham Turnpike road in 1764 brought some improvement, but the road surface was unable to cope with regular heavy loads, and so traffic in the winter was sporadic. Improvements to the River Soar, authorised in 1776, and the construction of the Erewash Canal between 1777 and 1779 resulted in further improvements. A short spur from the Erewash Canal had been built to connect with a wagonway to Lord Stanhope's estates at Stanton and Dale. Coal from the Shipley Colliery reached the canal by a wooden tramway, and tolls were limited to 1s 6d (equivalent to £11.28 in 2025), per ton on the canal, but the canal company promised a 50 per cent reduction if the mine owners were to build a branch canal from the main line along the Nutbrook Valley.

Nutbrook Canal Act 1793
- Act of Parliament
- Parliament of Great Britain
- Long title: An Act for making and maintaining a Navigable Canal from the Collieries at Shipley and West Hallam, in the County of Derby, to the Erewash Canal, in the Parish of Stanton by Dale, in the said County.
- Citation: 33 Geo. 3. c. 111
- Territorial extent: Great Britain

Dates
- Royal assent: 3 June 1793
- Commencement: 3 June 1793 (Note: The Acts of Parliament (Commencement) Act 1793.)

Status: Current legislation

Text of statute as originally enacted

The first moves to build a canal were made in 1791, when Edward Miller Mundy, the owner of Shipley Hall, and Sir Henry Hunloke of Wingerworth, owner of the West Hallam collieries, investigated the possibility of building a canal without an act of Parliament. However, an act was sought in 1792, but it was defeated in March, by objections from landowners who wanted it to be owned by a public company, rather than the mine owners. The canal engineer William Jessop was asked to produce a detailed design for the canal, which he estimated would cost £12,542 (equivalent to £1,613,000 in 2025), and John Nuttall surveyed the route and produced detailed plans. The Nutbrook Canal Act 1793 (33 Geo. 3. c. 111) authorising construction was obtained on 3 June 1793, and allowed the owners to raise £13,000, with a further £6,500 if required. Shares were given to investors by a formal agreement, as the canal was not a public company; public status would have prevented the colliery owners from obtaining their 50 per cent reduction of tolls on the Erewash Canal.

=== Construction ===
Benjamin Outram, a man with previous experience of canal building, having completed the Cromford Canal, and a partner of William Jessop in the Butterley Company, was appointed as engineer, and supervised the direct labour force who built the canal. When built, the canal was 4.5 miles (7.2 km) long, with thirteen locks, each 73 by 14.25 feet (22.25 by 4.34 m), giving a total rise of 84 feet (26 m). The system was fed by Shipley Reservoir, which in turn was fed by the Nut Brook. The canal was brought into use in stages, with the first tolls being collected in November 1794, and 17 boats carrying 639 tons recorded in that year. The canal reached West Hallam in June 1795, but it was not until May 1796 that the final section with its three locks was completed. Traffic figures for July 1796 showed that 1,602 tons had originated from the Shipley colliery and 1,158 tons from West Hallam.

The canal ran beside the Nut Brook for most of its length, diverging at its southern end towards its junction (later known as Nutbrook Junction) with the Erewash Canal just above Heath Lock. There were two significant branches from the main line. One from just below Moor's Bridge went to Sir Henry Hunloke's estate at West Hallam, while a second, smaller branch left the main line just above Lock 3 to connect with Lord Stanhope's wagonway. The costs of construction overran, and were quoted as £22,801 (equivalent to £2,500,000 in 2025), in a report to the Derbyshire Justices, made at the start of 1797. The excess over the £19,500 authorised by the act of Parliament was managed by further calls on the shareholders, and debts were repaid out of the initial receipts.

=== Operation ===
Traffic on the canal was never particularly heavy, for even in October 1821, when the canal was most prosperous, there were only about nine laden boats per day using it. Despite this, water supply was a regular problem. When first built, the canal was supplied by a reservoir at Shipley, constructed by building a dam across the valley at the end of the canal. The resultant lake provided an attractive feature for Shipley Hall, but flooded the coach road which provided access to it, and so a new bridge and road across the top of the dam were constructed. The reservoir was further topped up by a feeder from the stream above Hawley's Pond.

In November 1819, plans were made for a new reservoir, to be constructed above Hawley's Pond. A contract for £790 (equivalent to £59,900 in 2025), for the earthworks was given to Henry West and Joseph Belfield of Shipley, and John Kiddy was awarded a £265 (equivalent to £20,100 in 2025), contract to build a bridge and other stonework. The contractors claimed extra payments for strengthening the dam and providing more puddling when it was tested in February 1821. £1,520 (equivalent to £144,300 in 2025), had been advanced to them, which was well in excess of the actual cost, but they refused to return the excess, and the canal company resorted to legal action to obtain a refund. Despite the extra provision, there were still problems with providing sufficient water to operate the canal.

Toll rates on the canal were set at 8d (equivalent to £3.26 in 2025), per ton for coal from Shipley and West Hallam collieries and for all other goods, with reduced rates of 4d (equivalent to £1.63 in 2025),for other coal moved along the canal but not transferring to the Erewash Canal, and 1d (equivalent to £0.41 in 2025), for coal from the Mapperley, Kirk Hallam, Ilkestone and Little Hallam collieries. Joseph Outram, the younger brother of Benjamin Outram, complained about tolls for limestone, and they were cut by half from November 1796. Other concessions for road stone, manure, agricultural lime and gravel were made at intervals between 1798 and 1825.

Railway competition was first mentioned in 1832, when the Midland Counties Railway proposed to build a line along the west bank of the Erewash Canal, which would have crossed the Nutbrook Canal near its junction with the Erewash. Although the scheme was not fully sanctioned by Parliament, the full toll of 8d for coal was never charged afterwards. The Erewash Valley Railway was built in 1846, and although it followed the east bank of the Erewash Canal, branches from it were built to the Shipley Collieries and the Stanton iron mines, which directly affected trade on the canal. However, by reducing tolls, much of the traffic was retained.

=== Problems ===
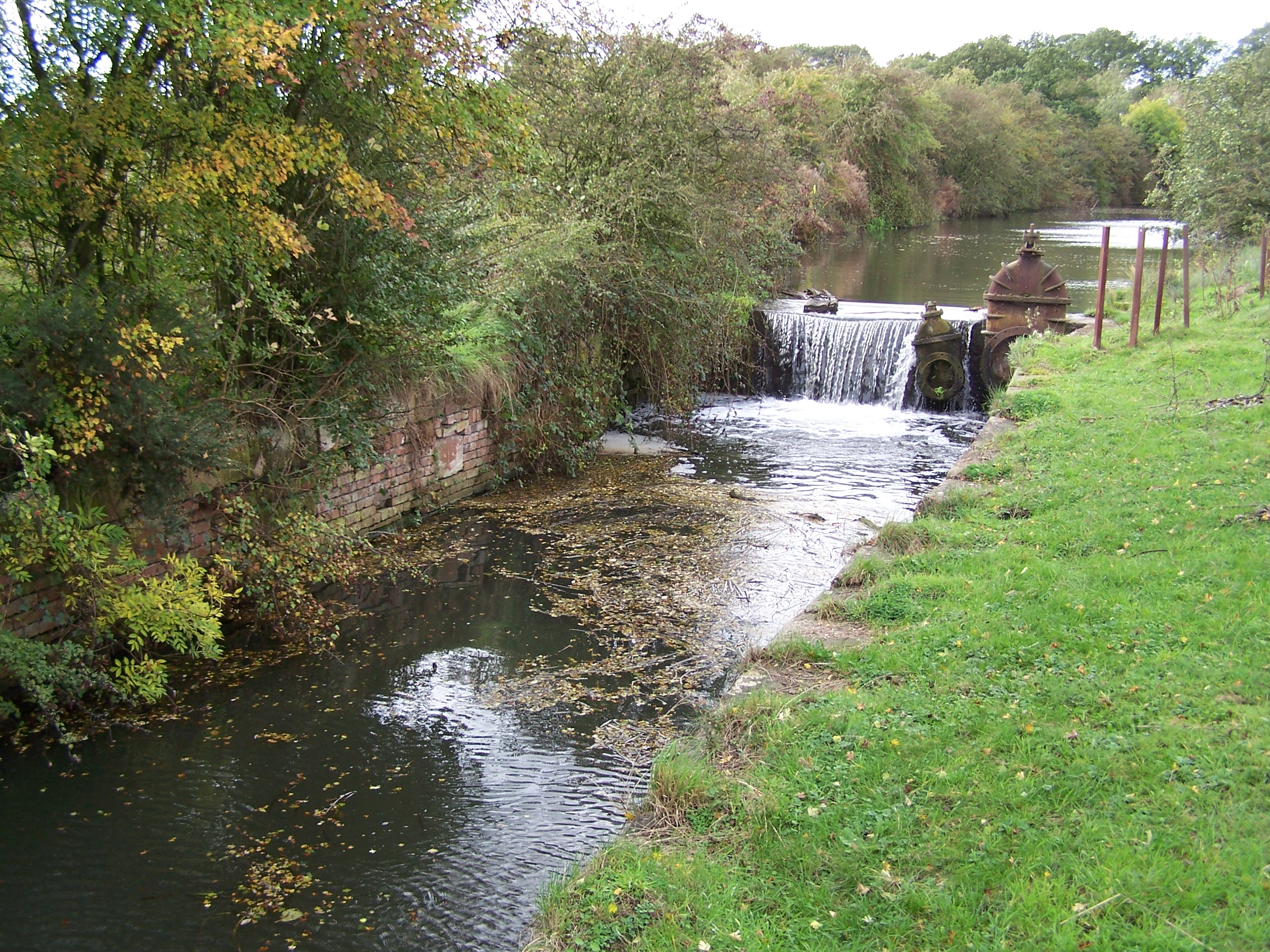
This is Old Furnace Lock the third on the canal near to Ilkeston. It has lost its gates but the valve gear can be seen in this image in 2006.

The canal company experienced a steady increase in the cost of maintenance as the years passed. In June 1852, they were notified that unless they paid £832 (equivalent to £100,000 in 2025), in compensation, coal would be mined from beneath the dam of the old reservoir at Shipley. The outcome of this confrontation is not clearly documented. In 1854, rainfall was less than two thirds of the normal average, and the reservoirs ran dry. Consideration was given to providing other sources of water, and £595 was spent on constructing a small reservoir on Mapperley Brook, and on raising the banks of the old reservoirs at Shipley and Mapperley. Further problems arose from seepage, which resulted in a puddle bank being constructed at the head of the canal between 1857 and 1866, and extensive puddling being carried out at Limekiln lock in 1866, which had little effect, since canal water was reputedly entering two mines there in 1867. The Derbyshire Assizes Court heard the claim for compensation in 1871, and ruled against the canal owners, who then faced a large bill for the work and another for compensating the mine owners. Closure of the canal was considered, but instead it was shut in September and October 1871 for the work to be done, and afterwards traffic improved briefly.

Railway expansion continued, with both the Midland Railway and the Great Northern Railway building tracks along the Nutbrook valley, which between them included seven bridges over the canal by 1880. The canal company attempted to sell itself to the Great Northern Railway in 1876, but the railway company declined to buy.

=== Decline ===
The condition of the canal continued to decline, with subsidence occurring at Shipley and under the West Hallam reservoir, on Mapperley Brook, in 1879. Traffic stopped on several occasions, due to a lack of water in the reservoirs. Excessive wastage from Mapperley reservoir was blamed on Charles Pounder, the canal keeper, and he was asked to leave in 1885, but his successor was worse. A final dividend was paid on the shares in 1885, and by 1888, the canal was barely solvent, for although 35,000 tons of coal and iron were carried, generating £440 of income, maintenance costs alone were £639. The company took legal advice, and it was suggested that they should take action against the collieries, since they had been extracting coal from beneath the canal and reservoirs which rightfully belonged to the canal company. Claims for damages were therefore made against the West Hallam, Ilkeston and Manners collieries. Shipley colliery was exempt, as they had generally paid for any obvious damage caused by their activities below ground. West Hallam colliery denied responsibility, and legal action was taken to obtain the money.

By 1894, income had dropped to £285, and a proposal was made to wind up the company as it was insolvent. Shipley colliery were keen not to have to rely solely on the railways for the transport of their product, and so rebuilt a railway from the pit head to Shipley Gate on the Erewash Canal. Smith, the manager of the colliery, claimed in evidence to a House of Lords Committee that it followed the line of the old wooden tramway, which had been built before the Nutbrook Canal, but it actually followed the 1848 branch of the Erewash Valley Railway. Although the volume of coal using this route gradually decreased, it was not until 1946 that it finally stopped.

=== Closure ===
In June 1895, Smith, acting for the canal, gave notice to the collieries that the gates of the locks above Stanton would be locked shut, as large amounts of rent were outstanding. The company attempted to obtain an act of abandonment in February 1896. The action was opposed by Manners Colliery, West Hallam Colliery, the Erewash Canal, the Grand Junction Canal, and a number of councils. Evidence was heard in March 1896, by which time £1,258 had been spent, and the canal company decided to withdraw the bill, rather than run up more debts. The middle section of the canal was bypassed by a 12-inch (30 cm) pipe, laid under the towpath, to ensure Stanton Ironworks still had a supply of water. No further action to repair the canal was taken.

In 1907, the company replied to a request from the Board of Trade for a statistical return that the canal was derelict, apart from 1.3 miles (2.1 km) "kept open for Stanton". A request from the Midland Railway to convert bridges over the canal into embankments was denied by the proprietors, on the basis that they did not have to authority to grant it. The railway bridge at West Hallam was rebuilt in the 1950s, although that at Derby Road was partly filled in at the same time. The road bridge at New Stanton was lowered in 1913 by the Ironworks Company, who attempted to get Shardlow Rural District Council to contribute to the cost, but there is no known record of the outcome. The legal status of the abandoned canal was formalised in 1925, when two holding companies were created, Nutbrook No 1 Company, to hold the shares of the original company, and Nutbrook No 2 Company to hold the shares of Nutbrook No 1 Company, and to attempt to purchase the freehold of the canal bed, to remove the burden of rental payments.

The Stanton Ironworks stood across the junction of the Nutbrook and Erewash Canals (and still does under different ownership) and continued to use the bottom section for the transport of finished iron products. Boats were loaded just above the second lock, but the volume of goods leaving the works by boat gradually declined. This part of the canal saw an increase in traffic during the Second World War in support of war efforts, with the carriage of slag bound for West Drayton, which was used in the construction of airfields, and bomb cases from a new foundry at Stanton Gate, opened by the Ministry of Supply. Stanton Ironworks sold all of their boats in July 1947, and some traffic continued until March 1949, when the last boat used the canal. A total of 59,411 tons were carried along this short stretch between 1940 and final closure.

In 1946, the Stanton Company paid £1,500 (equivalent to £54,320 in 2025), to Shipley Collieries for all of the canal south of the Shipley boundary, in order to safeguard its water supply. This did not include either Shipley or Mapperley reservoir, as the canal company never owned the freehold of these. The shares of the Nutbrook No 1 Company were transferred to the Stanton Company in late 1948, and this is where ownership still lies. Stanton Ironworks expressed interest in purchasing Mapperley reservoir when the National Coal Board sold the Shipley estates in 1966, but there were objections to their intent to raise and lower the water levels as required.

== Remains ==
A section of the canal above lock 3 remains in water, although the lock gates have been removed and replaced by weirs. Beyond this section, footpaths follow the course of the canal as far as Hallam wharf. Below lock 3, most of the canal has been filled in as the ironworks have expanded, but a pipe in the bed of the canal still delivers water to the works. The four-storey toll house at the Ladywood Road bridge remained until 1965 when it was demolished by the local council. Mapperley reservoir and Hawley's Pond are still there, but Shipley reservoir has been transformed as its site was occupied by the lake at the centre of The American Adventure Theme Park, until its closure in 2007. Two original bridges connected with the reservoir are located at its southern end. Colliery Road Bridge is a single-arched grade II listed structure built of sandstone and red brick, while Paul's Arm Bridge is of a similar construction but has two arches.

The Great Northern Railway Branch through Stanton Ironworks crossed the canal within the works. The bridge over which the railway crossed is notable for having been damaged during a bombing raid by German airships in 1916 during World War One.

Part of the derelict canal is used for angling. The Stanton Fishing Club manages and maintains a section of the canal on Quarry Hill road in Ilkeston.

== Course ==
Point	Coordinates (Links to map resources)	OS Grid Ref	Notes
Junction	52.946°N 1.286°W	SK481389	Erewash Canal
Stanhope Arm	52.951°N 1.312°W	SK463395	Jn with main line
Hunloke Arm	52.966°N 1.326°W	SK453411	Jn with main line
Hallam Wharf	52.978°N 1.334°W	SK448424	
Shipley Basins	52.989°N 1.337°W	SK445437	Upper terminus
Shipley Old Reservoir	52.992°N 1.339°W	SK444441	(American Adventure Park lake)
Hawley's Pond	52.985°N 1.341°W	SK443432	
Mapperley Reservoir	52.987°N 1.354°W	SK434434	Dam

== Bibliography ==
- De Salis, Henry Rodolph (1969). Bradshaw's Canals and Navigable Rivers. David and Charles. ISBN 978-0-7153-4689-1.
- Hadfield, Charles (1970). The Canals of the East Midlands (Second ed.). David and Charles. ISBN 978-0-7153-4871-0.
- Hadfield, Charles; Skempton, A.W. (1979). William Jessop, Engineer. David and Charles. ISBN 978-0-7153-7603-4.
- Henshaw, Alfred (2000). The Great Northern Railway in the East Midlands. RCTS. ISBN 978-0-901115-88-1.
- Priestley, Joseph (1831). Historical Account of the Navigable Rivers, Canals, and Railways of Great Britain. Archived from the original on 3 March 2016.
- Russell, Ronald (1971). Lost Canals of England and Wales (First ed.). David and Charles. ISBN 978-0-7153-5417-9.
- Schofield, R.B. (2000). Benjamin Outram. Cardiff: Merton Priory Press. ISBN 978-1-898937-42-5.
- Stevenson, Peter (1970). The Nutbrook Canal, Derbyshire. David and Charles. ISBN 978-0-7153-5334-9.
