= Arthur Wilmot =

English cricketer and clergyman

Personal information
- Full name: Arthur Alfred Wilmot
- Born: 14 February 1845; Derby, England
- Died: 12 May 1876 (aged 31); Morley, Derbyshire, England
- Batting: Right-handed

Domestic team information
- Years: Team
- 1871: Derbyshire
- Only FC: 17 August 1871 Derbyshire v Lancashire

Career statistics
Competition	First-class
Matches	1
Runs scored	0
Batting average	0.00
100s/50s	0/0
Top score	0
Catches/stumpings	1/0
- Source: CricketArchive, 16 December 2010

Arthur Alfred Wilmot (14 February 1845 — 12 May 1876) was an English clergyman and cricketer who played first-class cricket for Derbyshire in 1871.

== Life ==
Wilmot was born in Chaddesden Hall, Derby the son of Sir Henry Sacheverel Wilmot and his wife Maria Mundy, sister of Edward Miller Mundy. He was educated at Repton School and University College, Oxford. He took Holy Orders and became a clergyman. He also played club cricket for a number of sides including Free Foresters, Old Oxonians, Staffordshire, Burton and Gentlemen of Derbyshire. He became rector of Morley, Derbyshire in 1871.

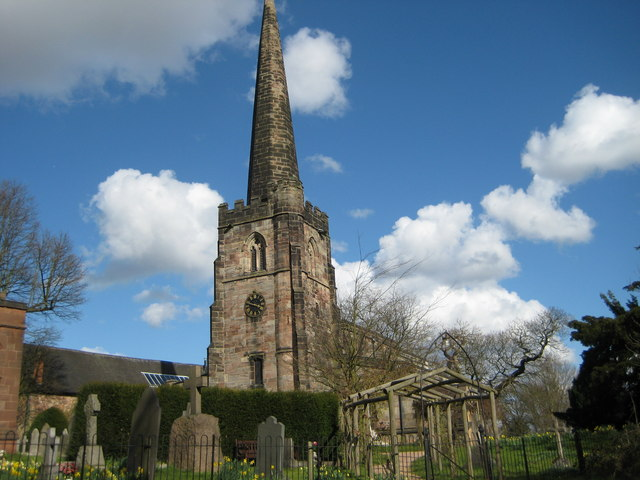
St Matthew's Church, Morley

Wilmot appeared in the second match Derbyshire played as a county side, in the 1871 season, in which he failed to score in either innings but took a catch.

Wilmot continued playing for club sides until 1874. He died at Morley at the age of 31.

Wilmot married Harriet Cecilia FitzHerbert in 1872 and their son Ralph Wilmot succeeded his brother Sir Henry Wilmot, 5th Baronet to the Baronetcy as the 6th Baronet.
