= Edward Miller Mundy (1800–1849) =

British politician (1800–1849)

Edward Miller Mundy (10 November 1800 – 29 January 1849) was an English Conservative politician who sat in the House of Commons from 1841 to 1849.

Miller was the son of Edward Miller Mundy and his wife Nelly Barton, daughter of James Barton, of Penwortham, Lancashire. His grandfather, who was also named Edward Miller Mundy, was a Member of Parliament for Derbyshire from 1784 until his death in 1822. Miller's father died in 1834, leaving him Shipley Hall.

Miller was first elected Member of Parliament for South Derbyshire at the 1841 general election, topping the poll in a four corner fight. At the 1847 general election, he was re-elected without opposition and held the seat until his death two years later. He voted with the Conservative party, and supported agricultural protection.

Miller never married. He died at Barbados at the age of 48. His uncle Robert Miller Mundy had a colonial career in the West Indies. His nephew Arthur Wilmot played cricket for Derbyshire.

His brother, Alfred Miller Mundy (9 January 1809 – 29 March 1877), an administrator and politician in South Australia, inherited his estate.

Parliament of the United Kingdom
Preceded by George Harpur Crewe and Francis Hurt	Member of Parliament for South Derbyshire; 1841–1849; With: Charles Robert Colvile	Succeeded by Charles Robert Colvile and William Mundy
