= St Helen's Church, Trowell =

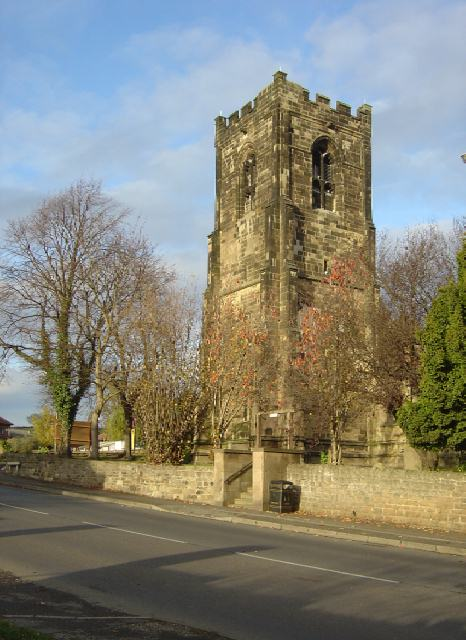
- St Helen's Church, Trowell
- St Helen's Church, Trowell
- 52°57′11″N 1°16′53″W
- OS grid reference: SK 48370 39743
- Location: Trowell
- Country: England
- Denomination: Church of England

History
- Dedication: Saint Helena

Architecture
- Heritage designation: Grade II* listed

Administration
- Diocese: Diocese of Southwell and Nottingham
- Archdeaconry: Nottingham
- Deanery: Nottingham North
- Parish: Trowell

St Helen's Church, Trowell is a Grade II* listed Anglican parish church in Trowell, Nottinghamshire, England.

== History ==
The first record of a church in Trowell is from 801, when a wooden church was built.

The present Early English chancel was built in 1080, and the Domesday Book says "Here is a priest and half a church and six acres of meadow." Much of the current church dates from the 13th century, with the tower having been added in 1480. A Victorian restoration was undertaken in 1890 by Charles Hodgson Fowler at a cost of £1,500.

From 2016, a renewal project was supported by public donations to replace the heating system. It was reopened in 2018, but further work was planned to improve the power supply and lighting.

The Church of England parish of Trowell is part of a benefice with St Peter's Church, Awsworth and St Catherine's Church, Cossall within the Diocese of Southwell and Nottingham.

== Architecture ==
The sandstone building consists of a three-bay nave, two-bay chancel, three-bay north and south aisles and a porch on the south side. The two-stage west tower has a crenelated parapet and is supported by four corner buttresses. The stained glass includes a window by Charles Eamer Kempe. The octagonal font dates from the 15th century.

=== Organ ===
The organ is by Brindley and Foster. It was installed in 1900 and funded by William Smith, a local miller. A specification of the organ can be found on the National Pipe Organ Register.

=== Clock ===
The clock on the tower was built in 1881 for the Nottingham Exchange by G. & F. Cope and moved here in 1927.

== See also ==
- Grade II* listed buildings in Nottinghamshire
- Listed buildings in Trowell
