= Trowell =

Village and civil parish in Nottinghamshire, England

Coordinates: 52.953°N 1.282°W

- Village and civil parish
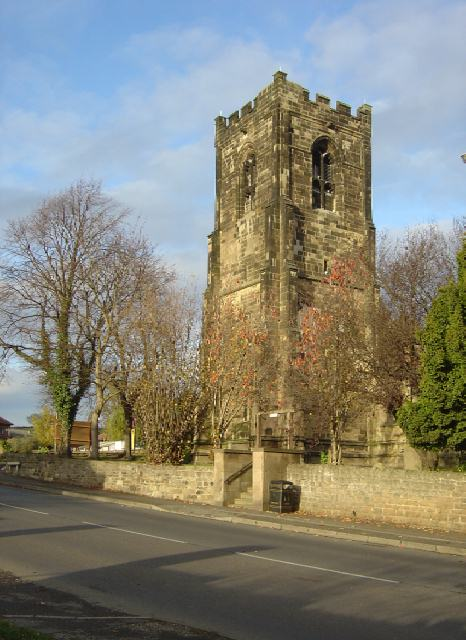
- St Helen's, Trowell

- Location within Nottinghamshire
- Interactive map of Trowell
- Area: 2.51 sq mi (6.5 km^{2})
- Population: 2,287 (2021)
  - Density: 911/sq mi (352/km^{2})
- OS grid reference: SK 48232 39789
  - London: 110 mi (180 km) SSE
- District: Borough of Broxtowe
- Shire county: Nottinghamshire
- Region: East Midlands
- Country: England
- Sovereign state: United Kingdom
- Post town: NOTTINGHAM
- Postcode district: NG9
- Dialling code: 0115
- Police: Nottinghamshire
- Fire: Nottinghamshire
- Ambulance: East Midlands
- UK Parliament: Broxtowe
- Website: trowell.org.uk

Trowell (/ˈtraʊl/) is a village and civil parish in Nottinghamshire, England. It lies a few miles west of Nottingham, in the borough of Broxtowe on the border with Derbyshire. According to the 2001 census it had a population of 2,568, falling to 2,378 at the 2011 census, and 2,287 at the 2021 census.

The village is believed to have Saxon origins. The parish had a population of around 50, with four manors and a church, by 1066. Coal was extracted nearby from the 13th century until 1928.

The main road through the village is the A609 between Nottingham and Ilkeston and A6007 from nearby Stapleford. The M1 motorway also passes through the village, and the Trowell Motorway Services lie just to the north. Most of the village lies between the River Erewash (Derbyshire boundary) and Nottingham Canal.

Herbert Morrison selected Trowell as the "Festival Village" for the 1951 Festival of Britain, as a typical example of British rural life. Conveniently close to the geographical centre of England, the village was found to be far from the chocolate box idyll: there was no village green, and its three public houses had closed. The belching chimneys and slag heaps of an ironworks to the west dominated the village. Morrison responded to hostile questions in the House of Commons that Trowell was "the type of English village where the old rural life is passing away and where an industrial community has been superimposed", "[i]t was chosen merely as an example of modern social problems in a village", and its selection would "encourage places which are not conventionally beautiful ... to have a go at improving their amenities". Trowell celebrated its selection with several events: a cricket match played in Victorian dress, awards for the best back and front gardens, a performance of Sir Edward German's comic opera Merrie England, and cleaning the church clock.

Trowell village's main attraction and largest employer is Trowell Garden Centre & Coffee Shop which is located on the Nottingham Canal, Erewash Valley Trail and Broxtowe Nature Reserve where you can still see the original lock keepers cottages and Grade II listed Swansea Bridge built in 1794–96 The parish church is St Helen. The village pub is The Festival Inn on Ilkeston Road (A609).

== See also ==
- Listed buildings in Trowell
