= Nottingham Canal =

Canal in the East Midlands, England

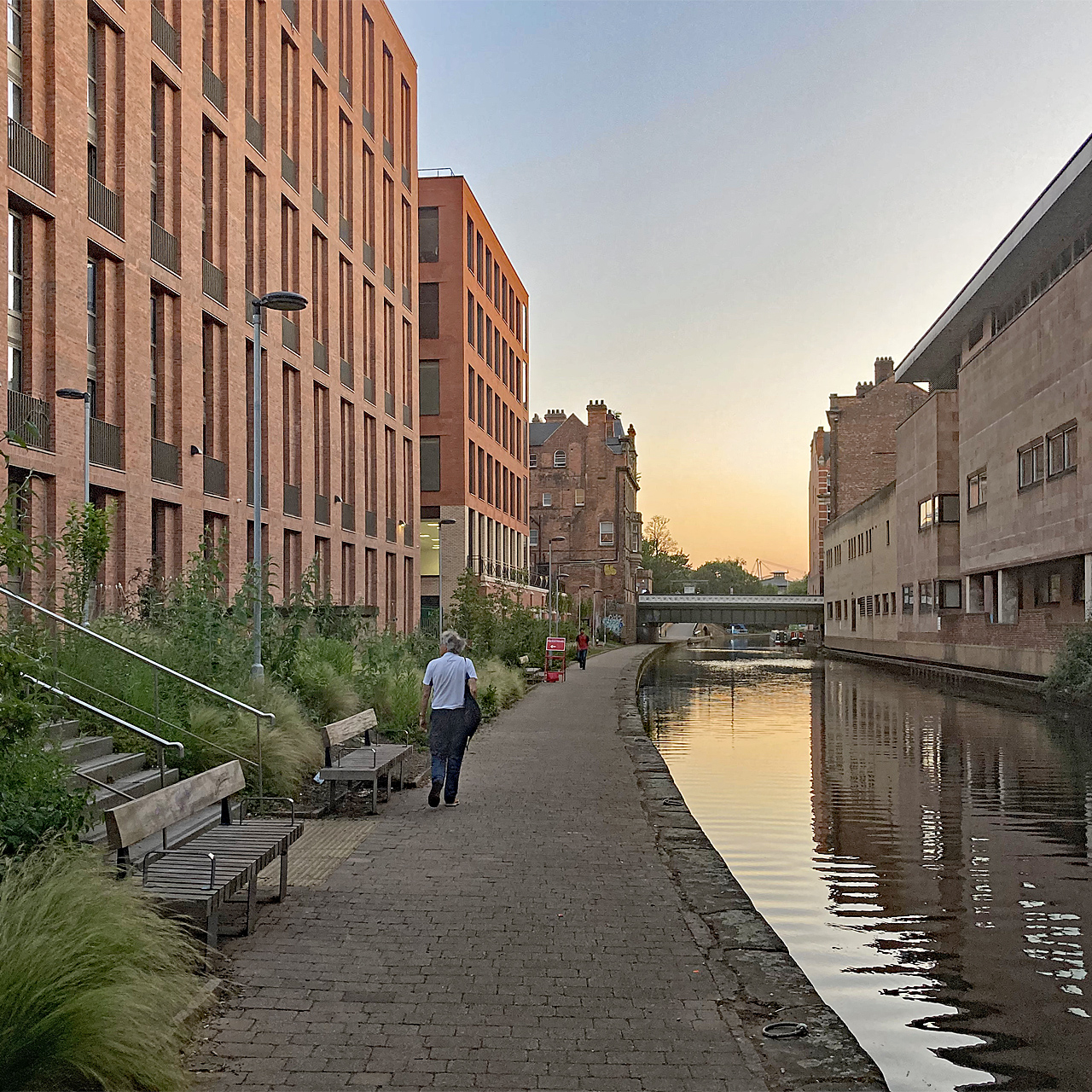
- The Canal
- Interactive map of Nottingham Canal

Specifications
- Maximum boat length: 85 ft 0 in (25.91 m)
- Maximum boat beam: 14 ft 6 in (4.42 m)
- Locks: 19 + 1 stop lock
- Status: parts in use / nature reserve / infilled

History
- Principal engineer: William Jessop
- Date of act: 1792
- Date completed: 1796
- Date closed: 1937

Geography
- Start point: Langley Mill
- End point: Nottingham
- Connects to: River Trent

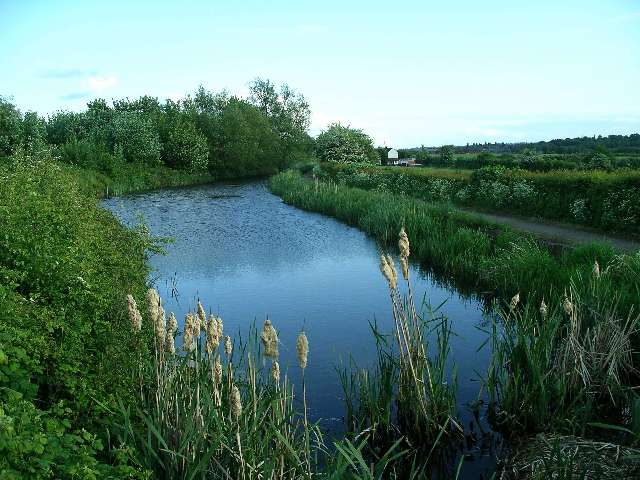
The Nottingham Canal

The Nottingham Canal is a canal in the English counties of Nottinghamshire and Derbyshire. As built, it comprised a 14.7-mile (23.7 km) long main line between the River Trent just downstream of Trent Bridge in Nottingham and Langley Mill in Derbyshire. At the same time as the main line of the canal was built by its proprietors, the separate Trent Navigation Company built the Beeston Cut, from the main line at Lenton in Nottingham to rejoin the River Trent upstream of Nottingham, thus bypassing the difficult section of navigation through Trent Bridge. The section of the main line between Trent Bridge and Lenton, together with the Beeston Cut, is still in use, forming part of the navigation of the River Trent and sometimes referred to as the Nottingham and Beeston Canal. The remainder of the main line of the canal beyond Lenton has been abandoned and partially filled.

The canal leaves the River Trent by Meadow Lane Lock and runs close to Nottingham city centre, serving a number of wharves in the city. It rises through Castle Lock, overlooked by Nottingham Castle, and then continues to Lenton. From here the Beeston Cut continues to Beeston Lock, where it reenters the River Trent. Also from Lenton, the now disused main line rose through a further 17 locks to reach a long upper pound. At its upper end, a stop lock connected it to the Great Northern Basin, which provided access to the Erewash Canal and the Cromford Canal.

Construction began in 1792 and was completed in 1796, overrunning its budget by 77%. Traffic increased slowly, but from 1804 was sufficient to enable dividends to be paid to the shareholders. Competition from the railways began in the early 1840s, and rather than face continual decline, the company sold the canal to the Ambergate, Nottingham, Boston and Eastern Junction Railway. A series of amalgamations took place, and by 1923, the canal was owned by the Great Northern Railway (GNR). The GNR leased the section from Lenton to the Trent to the Trent Navigation Company in 1936, and abandoned the remainder of the main line the following year. The Trent Navigation Company bought their section outright in 1946, whilst Nottingham City Council bought the section from Lenton to the city limits and began filling it in from 1955. Broxtowe Borough Council subsequently bought 6 miles (9.7 km) of the upper section with the intention of retaining it as a public amenity. There was a brief attempt at re-opening the upper section for navigation, but subsequent road construction and the destruction of the canal bed by open-cast mining have made that impractical.

The main line of the canal from Trent Bridge to Lenton, together with the Beeston Cut from Lenton back to the Trent is still used by boats, as well as walkers on the towpath. In central Nottingham, the Castle Wharf area has been redeveloped with waterside bars and restaurants. On some parts of the abandoned section of the canal, the towpath is used by walkers, cyclists and naturalists, with some parts used for angling and horse riding. Car parks have been provided, and Nottinghamshire County Council have assisted with making the towpath accessible to the disabled.

== History ==
The idea for the canal first arose in 1790. Prior to that time, supplies of coal for Nottingham travelled down the Erewash Canal and along the River Trent. When the Cromford Canal was authorised in July 1789, there was concern that collieries which were located near it would thrive, at the expense of those nearer to Nottingham. There were also worries that the Erewash company would effectively have a monopoly on coal supplies, and might use this to increase prices. Convinced that these issues were not just idle speculation, Thomas Oldknow, John Morris and Henry Green lobbied for a public meeting. The meeting, held at the Guildhall on 26 October 1790, debated the idea of a canal running directly from the Cromford Canal to the Trent, joining it below Trent Bridge. Those present approved a plan, and formed a committee, which included two men who were also connected to the company building the Cromford Canal.

The committee called upon the services of the surveyor William Jessop, who had experience with the successful Cromford Canal. A possible route had already been suggested by Lord Middleton, owner of Wollaton Hall and coal mines at Wollaton, but Jessop discounted this, on the basis that it would involve lengths of deep cutting and some tunnelling. Jessop then became ill, and suggested that the survey could be carried out by James Green, who worked for Lord Middleton at Wollaton. The committee decide to wait for Jessop to recover, but after six months, they relented and asked Green to survey the route in June 1791, as well as a branch from Lenton across Beeston Meadows to join the Trent at Beeston. This would allow traffic on the river to bypass Trent Bridge, where passage was difficult, and to pass the wharves in Nottingham. When the Erewash Canal company learnt of the proposal, they approached Nottingham Corporation about them building a route from Beeston through Nottingham to the Trent, but at this stage the Corporation declined.

Green's work was overseen by Jessop, and in September 1791, Jessop had produced a route and an estimated cost. The first route had passed to the west of Wollaton Park, but Lord Middleton had insisted that unless it ran on the eastern side of his park, he would oppose the whole plan. Although this route was more expensive to construct, the eastern route was chosen. The committee accepted Jessop's estimate at the September meeting, and a public meeting was arranged on 25 October, where there was enthusiastic support for the new canal. They agreed to limit dividends to ten per-cent, and negotiations with the Cromford Canal company resulted in an agreement for the Nottingham company to build reservoirs which would feed into the Cromford Canal, so that water could pass into the Nottingham Canal at its northern end.

It was the time of Canal Mania, and the initial offers for shares were over-subscribed. Amidst discontent from land owners, dividends were further limited to eight per-cent, the tolls on coal were reduced, and £20,000 of shares were set aside for purchase by the land owners. The bill was opposed by the Erewash Canal and the Trent and Mersey Canal, who were promoting a plan for the Trent Canal from Derwent Mouth, where the Trent and Mersey ended, via the Erewash, Beeston and Nottingham to the Trent below Nottingham. The Trent Navigation also argued against it, because they wanted to build the Beeston Cut themselves. Complicated negotiations followed, in which the Beeston Cut was dropped from the bill, on the understanding that the Trent Navigation would then apply to build it, and the Trent Canal bill was withdrawn when the Trent Navigation pledged to pursue a bill to improve the river. When an act of Parliament, the Nottingham Canal Act 1792, was granted in May that year there were great celebrations in Nottingham.

=== Construction ===
Nottingham Canal Act 1792
- Act of Parliament
- Parliament of Great Britain
- Long title: An Act for making and maintaining a Navigable Canal from the Cromford Canal, in the County of Nottingham, to or near to the Town of Nottingham, and to the River Trent near Nottingham Trent Bridge; and also certain collateral Cuts therein described, from the said intended Canal.
- Citation: 32 Geo. 3. c. 100
- Territorial extent: Great Britain

Dates
- Royal assent: 8 May 1792
- Commencement: 31 January 1792 (Note: Start of session.)
Other legislation
Amended by	London Midland and Scottish Railway (Canals) Act 1944

Status: Amended

Text of statute as originally enacted

The Nottingham Canal Act 1792 (32 Geo. 3. c. 100) created the Nottingham Canal Company, who could raise £50,000 by issuing shares of £100, and could raise another £25,000 by obtaining a mortgage or by assigning the tolls, if required. The company were to build reservoirs which would feed into the Cromford Canal, in compensation for the water taken from that canal at Langley Mill. Jessop's original estimate for the cost of the works, excluding the Beeston Cut, had been £45,185 (£4,260,000 in 2015 ). Jessop was appointed engineer, with Green as superintendent, overseeing the day-to-day operation of the project. Benjamin Outram was given the task of calculating the water supply. He looked at the volumes of water flowing into the Erewash Canal and supplying mills on the Erewash, such as Langley Mill, and also at flows in the steams feeding the reservoirs. Measurements were taken in the summer of 1793, when flows were considerably less than in the winter, so that the amount of water that could be taken could be computed more accurately. Reservoirs were built at Greasley, which was sometimes called Moorgreen reservoir, and at Codnor Park, Butterley. Both fed water into the Cromford Canal, the first by a long feeder that entered the canal just above Langley Mill, while the second was a compensation reservoir, and was next to the canal, with only the towpath between them.

Work began on 30 July 1792. The River Leen ran along the southern edge of the city between Lenton in the west and Leen Bridge, a series of flood arches to the east. The river bed was enlarged to form the canal, while the river was diverted into a new covered channel further to the north. The flood arches were replaced by a new bridge, and the canal turned sharply to the south, to join the Trent. The proprietors wanted a basin where the canal joined the river, with a lock above that, but Jessop argued that such an arrangement would lead to the entrance becoming blocked with sand. Building the lock close to the river would ensure that the sand was flushed away whenever the lock was emptied. The town section was officially opened on 30 July 1793, giving access to wharves, although there was still much work to be completed. To the east of Leen Bridge, a weir was constructed, to feed water into the Brewery Arm, an enlargement of the river channel. At its far end, another weir overflowed back into the new course of the Leen. A second arm, the Poplar Arm, was made using water channels on Eastcroft Meadow, and joined the Brewery Arm.

The cost of building the canal onwards from Lenton exceeded Jessop's estimate, and by September 1794, this had been paid for by calling £140 on each of the £100 shares. Further calls were made, and had reached £150 in March 1795. In February 1795, sections of the new cut were damaged, when seven weeks of severe frost were followed by a rapid thaw which caused flooding. The proprietors wrote to Jessop to express their dissatisfaction with "the erroneous construction of many works on the canal and the very large expense incurred", but Jessop was already involved in much bigger projects. On 1 March 1796, the first boat reached Nottingham from the south, travelling along the completed Beeston Cut, which joined the Nottingham Canal at Lenton, and on 26 April, the whole length of the canal was open. The work had cost £80,000, and most of the proprietors resigned soon afterwards. The share issue was topped up by borrowing £5,000 as a mortgage, which had been repaid by 1804.

=== Operation ===
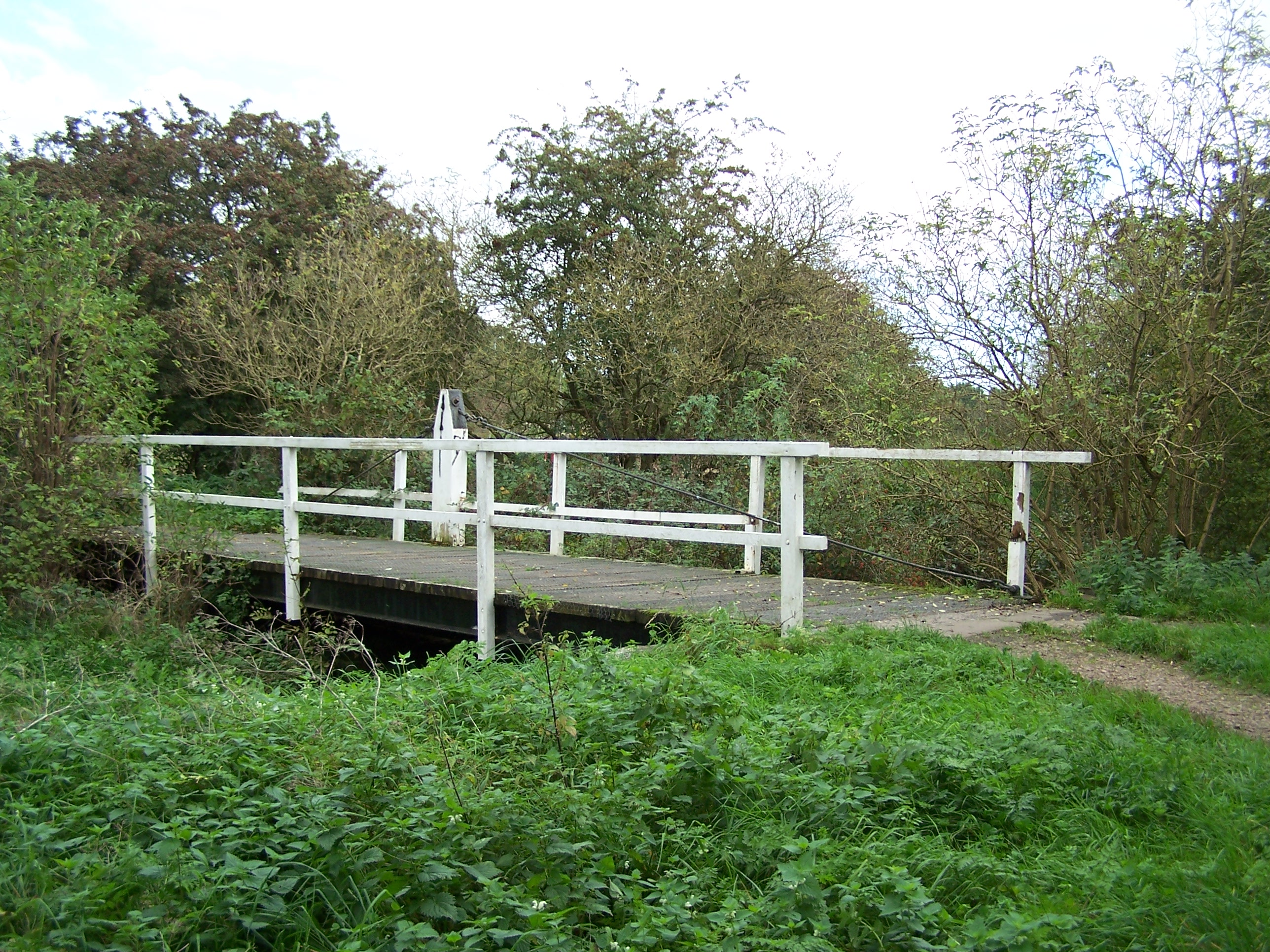
When the canal was in use this bridge could be swung out of the canal's line. Pictured in 2006

As built, the canal was 14.75 miles (23.7 km) long, and rose through 19 locks, each 85 feet (26 m) by 14.5 feet (4.4 m), with an additional stop lock at Langley, where the canal joined the Cromford Canal. 14 of the locks were concentrated in a flight at Wollaton, with a long, level section beyond that to Langley. There were a number of short branches. The Bilborough Arm was constructed from the main line, above Wollaton locks, to a wharf in Bilborough wood, from where tramways ran to Bilborough and Strelley collieries. The branch was privately owned, and was operational from mid 1799, but by 1813, much of it was no longer used and some of it had been filled in. The rest was abandoned around 1874. The Robinetts cut was located near Cossall, and was completed by 1796, while the Duke of Rutland's collieries at Greasley and Fillingham were served by the Greasley Arm, which was built in 1800. Both branches were linked to the collieries by tramways.

Trade built up steadily, although not quite at quickly as the company had estimated. Tolls produced £2,614 in the year to April 1798. During that year, a packet boat began running between Nottingham and Cromford, and in 1798, a second boat provided a service between Nottingham and Leicester. Income from tolls increased to £4,647 in 1799/1800. Most of the traffic was coal, amounting to 89,500 tons out of a total of 114,227 tons carried. Co-operation between the Cromford Canal and the Nottingham Canal was good, to the benefit of both companies. A brief attempt to poach traffic from the Erewash Canal in 1797 by undercutting their rates was a financial disaster, leading to an agreement to charge the authorised tolls for goods on both canals, and not to try to entice customers from each other. Once the mortgage was redeemed in 1804, the company agreed to pay dividends to the shareholders, at a rate of £12 per £150 share. These were paid twice a year, but from time to time a third payment was made, to reduce the backlog of payments, which were nine years in arrears on the date when the first payment was made. By 1830, tolls raised £9,879, and in 1840, this had risen to £12,825.

The company warehouse near Wilford Street, Nottingham, was destroyed on 28 September 1818 by an explosion, which resulted in two men dying. The Nottingham Boat Company had delivered 21 barrels of gunpowder, and a man named Musson noticed that some of the powder had leaked from a barrel. He rather foolishly dropped a hot cinder onto the powder, which caused it all to explode. He was thrown some 126 yards (115 m) by the blast. Several boats were destroyed and many of the surrounding buildings were damaged. When the insurance company refused to pay for the damage, the canal company sued the boat company, and were awarded £1,000, and some of the legal costs, but they could not pay, and the claim was dropped in 1828. In January 1826, the company prosecuted Hooton and Bradshaw for running a steam packet boat, which was forbidden by a regulation passed the previous May. However, the operators of the vessel protested, and the company changed their policy in May 1826, so that steam boats could be run at their discretion.

The Midland Counties Railway Act 1836 (6 & 7 Will. 4. c. lxxviii) included clauses to protect the canal, but were accused of interfering with the canal while they were building their line, and the Nottingham Canal obtained an injunction. As part of the negotiations, the company agreed to the construction of an interchange basin near to Nottingham Station. Although the station did not open until 1842, the canal company started to reduce tolls in mid 1840, to retain traffic against railway competition. Despite these efforts, income soon began to fall, from £12,536 in 1841 to £5,981 in 1852. Some workers were dismissed, salaries were reduced, and other cost-cutting initiatives were made. The company decided that it would be better to sell the canal to a railway company, rather than see continual decline, and the Ambergate and Manchester Railway agreed to pay £225 for each canal share, within six months of opening their line. However, the railway company amalgamated with two others, becoming the Ambergate, Nottingham, Boston and Eastern Junction Railway. They opened a line from Nottingham to Grantham in July 1850, but then refused to buy either the Nottingham Canal or the Grantham Canal, which had made the same agreement with the original railway company. After several court cases and an appeal to the House of Lords, the sale was agreed, and the final committee meeting of the canal company was held on 4 April 1856. A dividend of £1 and 10 shillings (£1.50) was paid on the original shares, but the shareholders only received £50 per share in cash from the sale, as the rest was paid in railway shares. Further amalgamations followed, and the canal was owned by the Great Northern Railway by 1861.

=== Decline ===
The Great Northern did little maintenance of the canal, and its condition slowly deteriorated. In 1916, the canal still carried 123,488 tons of traffic, with general merchandise accounting for 31,887 tons, coal at 17,133 tons, gravel at 16,819 tons, roadstone at 16,166 tons and manure at 14,731 tons. Tolls generated by this traffic were £1,028, but the majority of it was short-haul traffic, passing from the Trent to the Nottingham wharves, or using the Beeston Cut. There were regular complaints about a lack of water in the section from Lenton to Trent Lock, but the Great Northern did nothing to address the issues. Commercial traffic on the upper reaches above Lenton Lock ceased in 1928.

The Great Northern Railway had become part of the London and North Eastern Railway Company, when the railways were grouped in 1923, and they abandoned the main line of the canal in 1937. However, they leased the remaining section between Lenton and Trent Lock to the Trent Navigation Company from 1936, with an option to buy in due course, and it was purchased in 1946, to officially become part of the River Trent Navigation. Ownership passed to the British Transport Commission with the nationalisation of the waterways in 1948, and then to British Waterways in 1963. Since 2012, it has been managed by the Canal & River Trust.

Although abandoned, the unused canal still caused some problems. There were complaints that in times of heavy rainfall, the canal caused surrounding areas in the city to flood, and so Nottingham City Council bought the section running through the city in 1952. From 1955, a programme of draining the canal, laying pipes along its bed and filling it in began. The section from Derby Road to Radford Bridge Road, including locks 4 and 5, was completed in 1955, and by 1962, had reached lock 12 on the Wollaton flight. Lock 13 was adapted to feed surplus water into the pipes. Wollaton Colliery continued to use the canal to discharge water from the colliery bathhouse until its closure in late 1963, and once it had closed, the section up to lock 19 was drained and culverted in 1966. On 23 September 1964, a section of the top pound was drained, between Trowell and Wollaton, and a large portion of the remainder, between Awsworth and Bailey Grove, Eastwood was subsequently destroyed by opencast coal mining. Most of the route through the city has subsequently been built over. The final section from Derby Road to Lenton Chain was, however, re-used as a new course for the River Leen, and so is still in water.

=== Closure ===
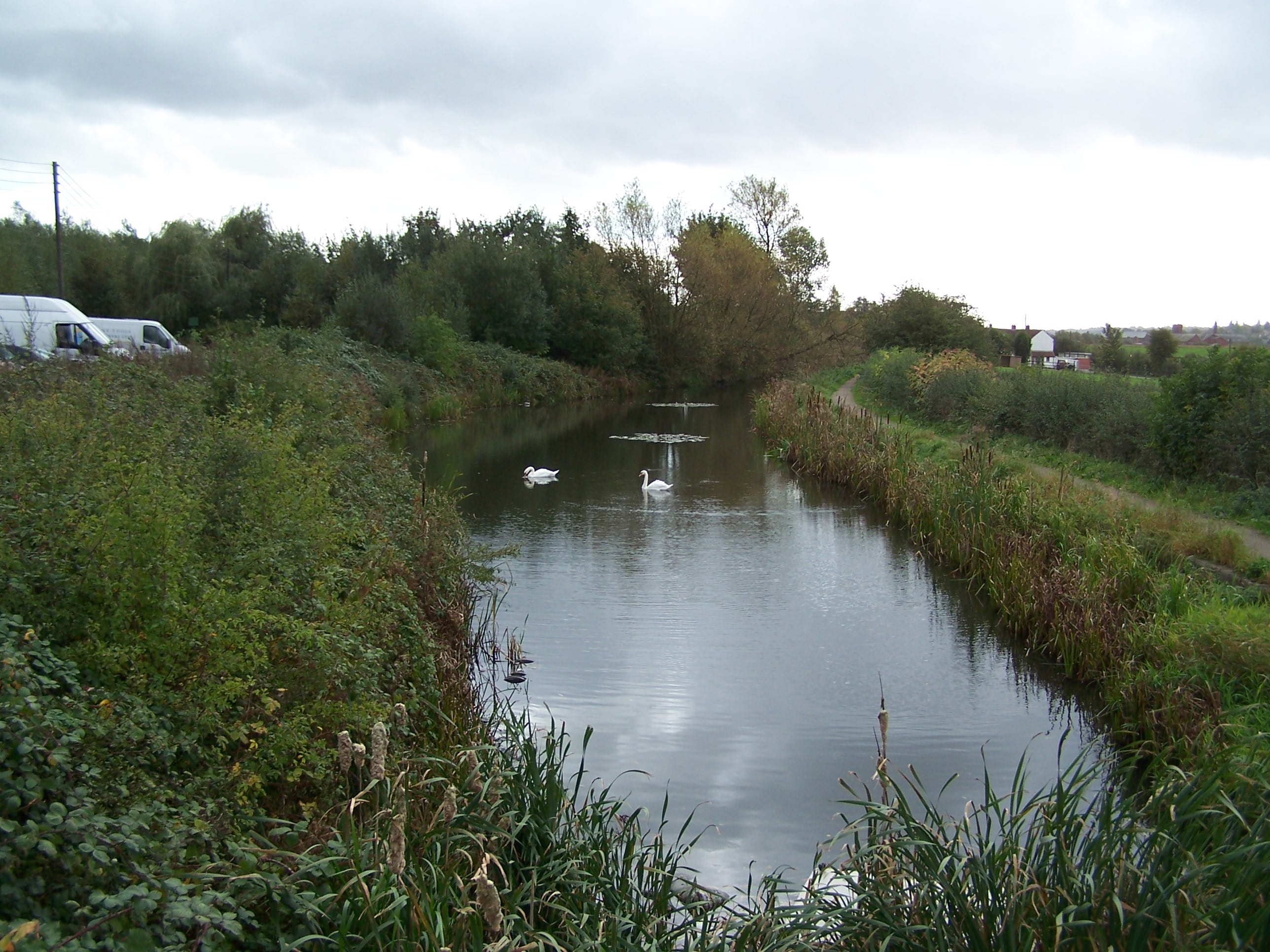
Part of the Nottingham Canal is maintained for Fishing. Pictured in 2006.

Following a public meeting on 22 July 1976, the Nottingham Canal Society was formed, with a view to preserving what was left of the canal, and to reinstating navigation between Langley Mill and Coventry Lane, Nottingham. They hoped to prevent further sections of the canal from being filled in, and to ensure that any plans for open-cast mining would include provision to reinstate the line of the canal afterwards. Also in 1976, children from Fernwood Junior School, Wollaton, created a nature trail along the bed of the canal near Wollaton colliery, and Browtowe Council announced that they were hoping to buy 5 miles (8.0 km) of the canal for £7,350. The canal society began holding working parties to trim hedges, repair bridges, and mend the canal banks from April 1977, once ownership had passed from British Waterways to Browtowe Council. They also campaigned for the Awsworth Bypass, which was scheduled to be built in 1980, to include navigable headroom where it crossed the canal. A breach of the canal occurred in 1978, when part of the embankment at Trowell, near to the M1 motorway, slipped. It was repaired by the society, with some labour supplied by one of the local prisons, and machinery supplied by the Waterway Recovery Group. Bridge restoration work was carried out on the swing bridge at Bailey Grove, Eastwood and on Tinsley Road bridge, but in early 1979, Nottinghamshire County Council declared that the cost of a navigable bridge on the Awsworth Bypass would be £428,000. As that amount of money was not available, there would be no navigable culvert, and as that effectively prevented the canal reopening for navigation, the canal society was wound up soon afterwards.

Plans for further open-cast mining, which would have destroyed the Robbinetts Arm, were altered in 1994, which was celebrated by the Robbinetts Action Group, a pressure group campaigning against such strip mining. In the 1990s, the feeder from Moorgreen Reservoir was dredged, so that the reservoir could again supply water to the bottom end of the Cromford Canal and the Great North Basin at Langley Mill. The reservoir, which is now managed as a carp fishery by the Greasley Estate, covers 38 acres (15 ha) and is up to 30 feet (9.1 m) deep in places, was built by the Nottingham Canal and is still owned by the Canal and River Trust.

== The canal today ==
=== The Nottingham and Beeston Canal ===
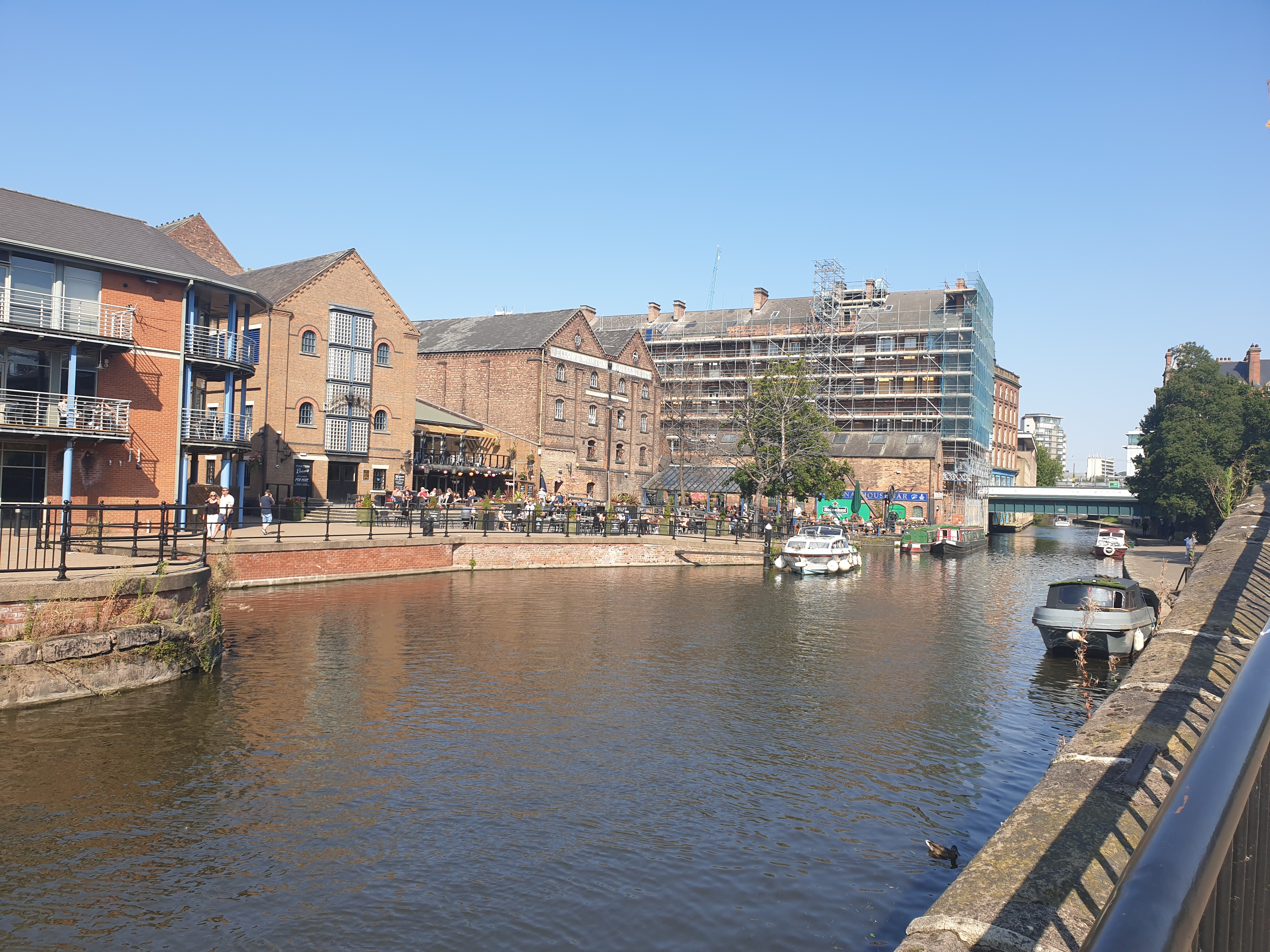
Castle Wharf on the Nottingham Canal in Nottingham

The section of Nottingham Canal between the River Trent just downstream of Trent Bridge and Lenton, together with the Beeston Cut from Lenton back to the Trent at Beeston Weir, remains in use as the Beeston and Nottingham Canal. This forms part of the navigation of the River Trent, with the river itself no longer navigable between Trent Bridge and Beeston Weir. This section was not originally built with a towpath, but in 1976, the Nottinghamshire Leisure Services Committee approved plans to construct one. The work took six years to complete, and was opened by Illtyd Harrington of British Waterways on 9 June 1982, at a ceremony also attended by the Lord Mayor of Nottingham, Peter Burgess. The towpath of the canal through Nottingham city centre forms part of Nottingham's Big Track, a 16-kilometre (9.9 mi) circular car-free cycle route and footpath, which follows the canal from the railway station in Nottingham to the Beeston locks, and then returns via the Trent riverside path.

The canal in the middle of Nottingham, where it is overlooked by Nottingham Castle, forms the centrepiece of the city's Castle Wharf area. This area, formerly the home to quays and warehouses, has been redeveloped with waterside bars and restaurants in the old warehouse buildings, as well as new offices and residential properties.

=== The closed section ===
In 1977 Broxtowe Borough Council bought a 6 miles (9.7 km) stretch of the top pound, running from Eastwood through Awsworth, Cossall and Trowell to the outer edge of the city of Nottingham at Bramcote. On the Trowell section are the remains of Swansea bridge, one of the original stone bridges, which is Grade II listed, was built in 1793–95, and has wooden keep gates. The view from the bridge overlooks Trowell Garden Centre where you can see the original stone built lock keepers cottages, 1&2 Swansea Cottages, Trowell, built in 1794–95. The name Swansea for the bridge and cottages originates from the fact that this particular part of the canal is where large quantities of swans used to congregate. Due to the lack of water in 1980 a decision was taken by the garden centre and the Royal Society for the Protection of Birds (RSPB) to relocate them.

Broxtowe Council are helped by several organisations in the management of the canal, including Nottinghamshire Wildlife Trust, The British Trust for Nature Conservation Volunteers, the Countryside Agency, Nottinghamshire County Council and Awsworth Angling Club. Because of the rich habitat that the route provides, it was declared a local nature reserve in 1993. Sections of wetland habitat and open water have been created by dredging, but a major part of the council's task has been to provide alternative supplies of water, since the Eastwood section is cut off from the Langley Mill basin and the original water supply from Moorgreen Reservoir by an infilled section, and there is a 2-mile (3.2 km) gap caused by open cast mining between Eastwood and Awsworth, which has destroyed the link with the water supply from Giltbrook. The need to dispose of rainwater when the Awsworth Bypass was built in 1995 provided one new source, and in 1998, an electric pump was installed to pump water from the River Erewash into the canal. Further development of the canal as an amenity took place in 1998, when the towpath and a number of bridleways connecting to the towpath were given public right of way status. The canal is well-used, by walkers, cyclists, and naturalists, with some sections available to anglers and horse riders. Nottinghamshire County Council have assisted with upgrading the towpath to provide disability access where possible.

== Points of interest ==
Point	Coordinates (Links to map resources)	OS Grid Ref	Notes
Langley Mill Basin	53.0198°N 1.3238°W	SK454471	Junction with Erewash Canal
Watered section	53.0093°N 1.3153°W	SK460459	
Start of Greasley Arm	52.9979°N 1.2829°W	SK482447	
Start of main watered section	52.9917°N 1.2927°W	SK475440	
A6096 road bridge	52.9827°N 1.2906°W	SK477430	
Coronation Road aqueduct	52.9807°N 1.2872°W	SK479428	
Robinetts Arm	52.9714°N 1.2779°W	SK485418	
End of watered section	52.9662°N 1.2814°W	SK483412	
M1 Motorway bridge	52.9552°N 1.2743°W	SK488400	
Railway bridge	52.9498°N 1.2476°W	SK506394	
Wollaton Top Lock	52.9576°N 1.2255°W	SK521403	
Wollaton Bottom Lock	52.9554°N 1.1927°W	SK543400	
Lenton Top Lock	52.9507°N 1.1855°W	SK548395	
Lenton Middle Lock	52.9477°N 1.1848°W	SK548392	
Lenton Bottom Lock	52.9423°N 1.1807°W	SK551386	
Castle Lock	52.9479°N 1.1519°W	SK570392	
Junction with Poplar Arm	52.9488°N 1.1396°W	SK579393	
Meadow Lane Lock	52.9404°N 1.1359°W	SK581384	
Beeston Lock	52.9129°N 1.2047°W	SK535353	Start of Beeston Cut
