= Shipley, Derbyshire =

Village in Derbyshire, England

Coordinates: 52.9995°N 1.3322°W

Shipley
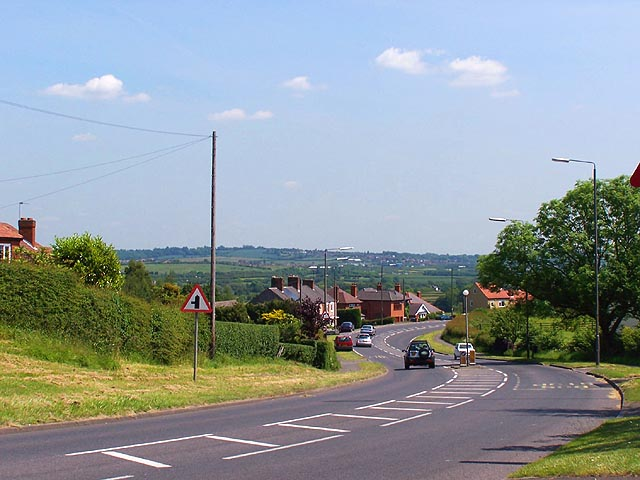
- Hardy Barn at Shipley on the main Ilkeston - Heanor Road (A6007).

- Location within Derbyshire
- Population: 710 (2011)
- OS grid reference: SK449448
- District: Amber Valley
- Shire county: Derbyshire
- Region: East Midlands
- Country: England
- Sovereign state: United Kingdom
- Post town: HEANOR
- Postcode district: DE75
- Dialling code: 01773
- Police: Derbyshire
- Fire: Derbyshire
- Ambulance: East Midlands
- UK Parliament: Amber Valley

Shipley is a village in the south-east of Derbyshire in the East Midlands of England. Since 1974 it has been part of the Borough of Amber Valley. The population of the civil parish as taken at the 2011 Census was 710.

Shipley is first mentioned in the Domesday Book of 1086, in the form Scipelei. The name apparently derives from the Old English scēap ('sheep') and lēah ('open ground, such as meadow, pasture, or arable land'). Thus it means 'sheep-clearing' or 'sheep-pasture'.

Shipley separates the Ilkeston and Heanor urban areas, which are linked by the main A6007 road. It also incorporates most of the Shipley Country Park and the hamlet known as 'The Field' which is usually seen as the centre of the civil parish, with the Anglican Parish Church being at Cotmanhay, to the north of Ilkeston.

The Nutbrook Canal, completed in 1796 linked Shipley to the Erewash Canal.

== See also ==
- Listed buildings in Shipley, Derbyshire
