= Erewash Canal =

Canal in Derbyshire, England

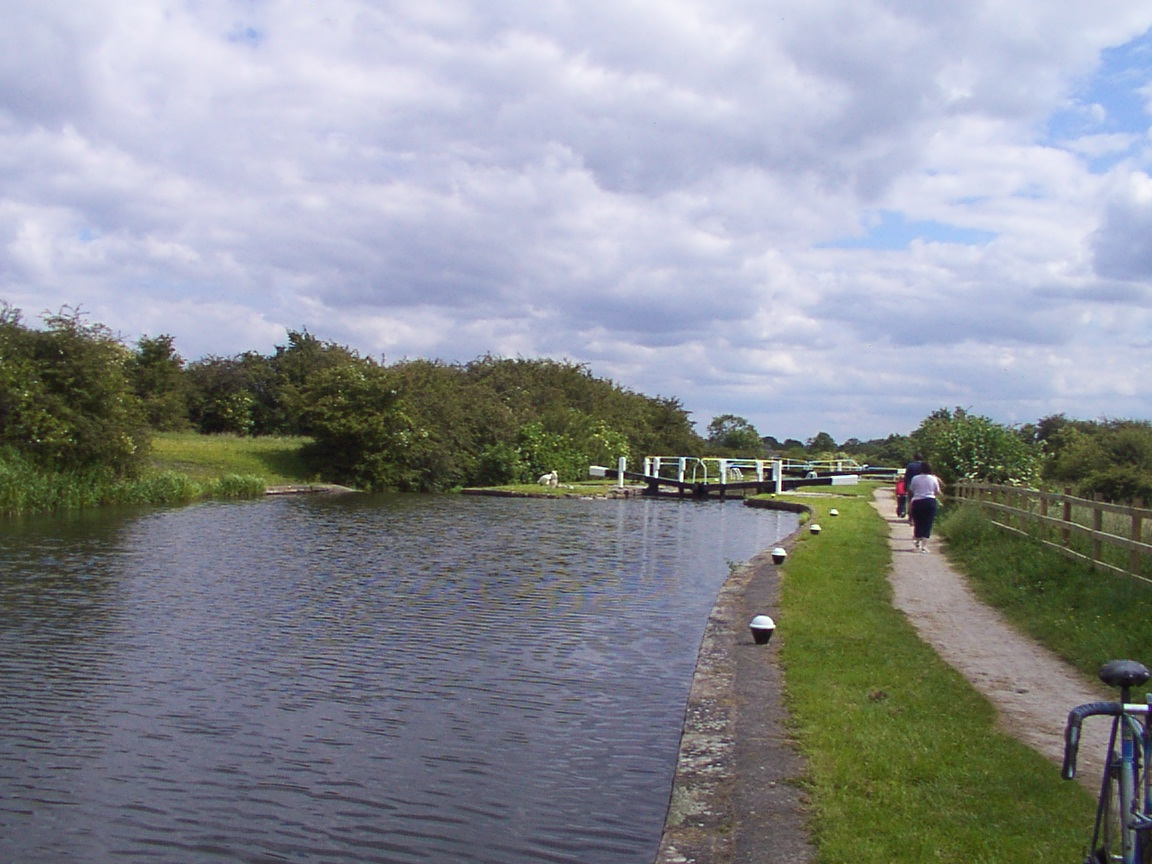
A View of the Erewash Canal above Eastwood Lock (Lock 1) at a place known locally as The Gudgeon

The Erewash Canal /ˈɛrəwɒʃ/ is a broad canal in Derbyshire, England. It runs just under 12 miles (19 km) and has 14 locks. The first lock at Langley Bridge is part of the Cromford Canal.

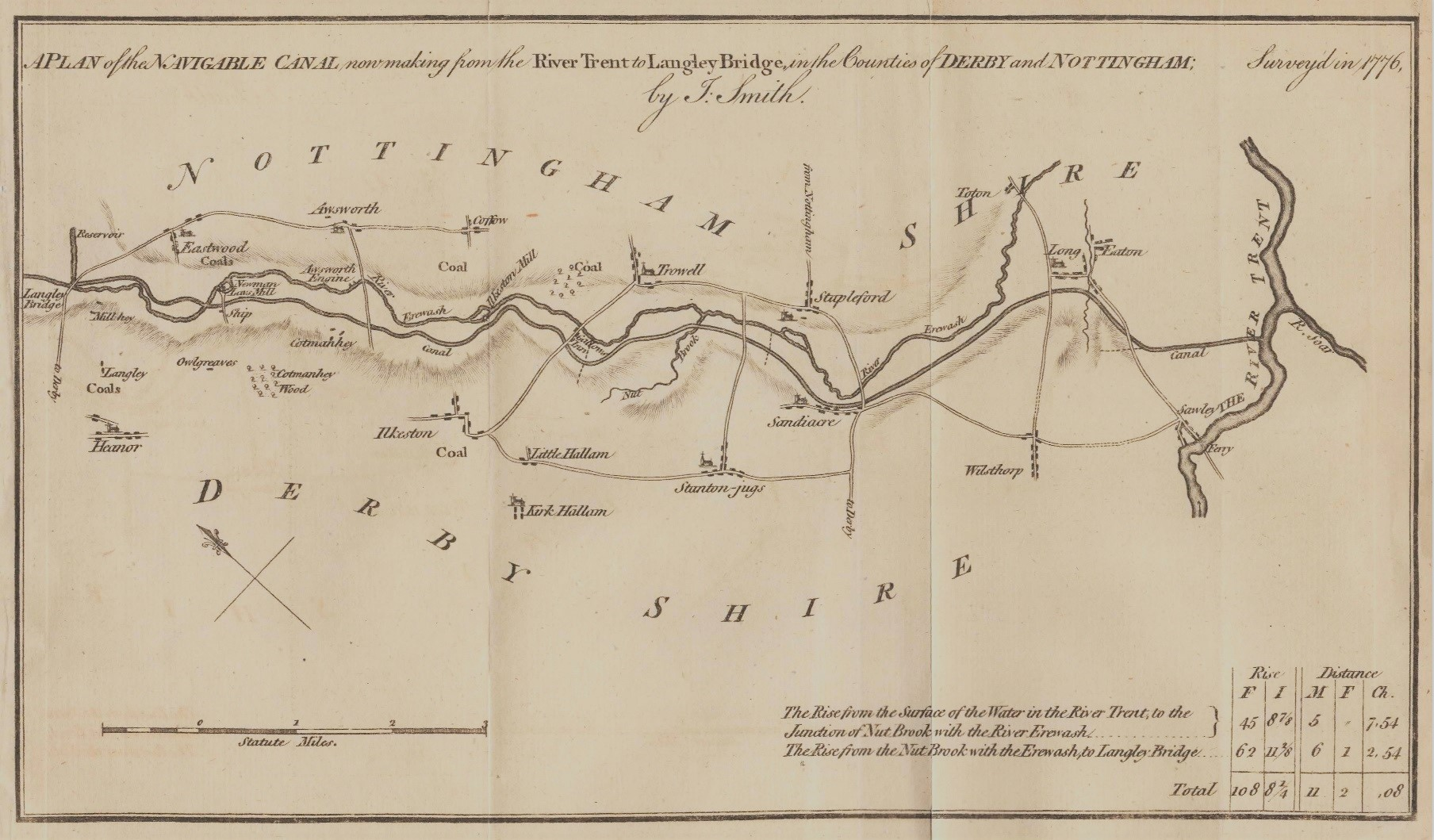
The Erewash Canal as surveyed by J.Smith in 1776

== Origins ==
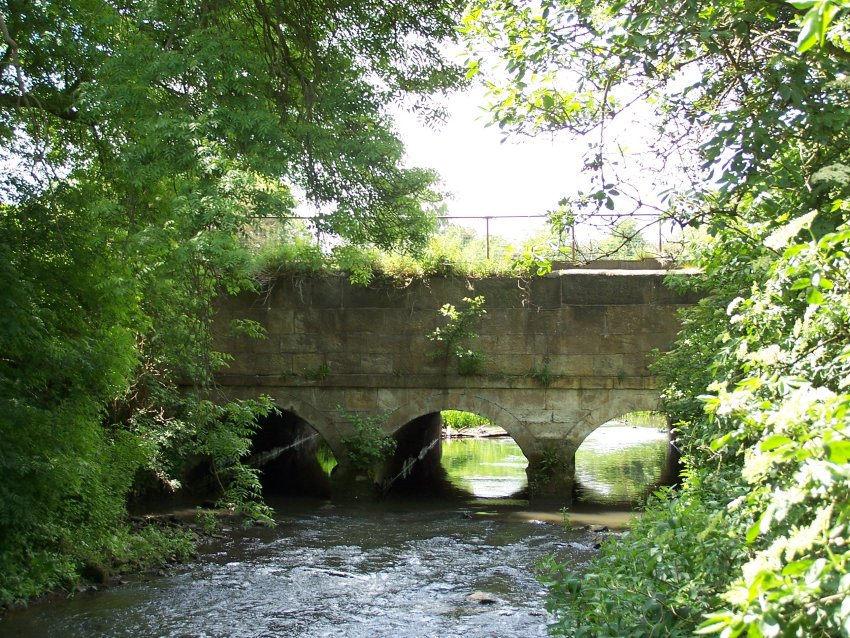
Erewash Aqueduct near Shipley Gate in 2007

Erewash Canal Act 1777 (Note: Section 1(2) of the Grand Union Canal Act 1943 (6 & 7 Geo. 6. c. v).)
- Act of Parliament
- Parliament of Great Britain
- Long title: An Act for making and maintaining a Navigable Cut or Canal from the River Trent, in the Lordship of Sawley and Long Eaton, in the County of Derby, to or near Langley Bridge, in the Counties of Derby and Nottingham.
- Citation: 17 Geo. 3. c. 69
- Territorial extent: Great Britain

Dates
- Royal assent: 30 April 1777
- Commencement: 31 October 1776 (Note: Start of session.)
Other legislation
| Amended by | Erewash Valley Railway Act 1845; Grand Union Canal Act 1943 |

Status: Amended

Text of statute as originally enacted

The canal obtained its act of Parliament, the Erewash Canal Act 1777 (17 Geo. 3. c. 69), with John Varley appointed as engineer and John and James Pinkerton the main contractors, it was completed in 1779 at a cost of £21,000 (£2,286,660 in 2015). It was a commercial success from the start mainly transporting coal.

The canal's success kept it going far longer than many of its contemporaries in the face of competition from the railways. When the Grand Union Canal Company took over the running of the Erewash in 1932 it was still a going concern. The canal was nationalised in 1947. By this time the closure of feeder canals resulting in a loss of trade and competition from other forms of transport was making itself felt and the last commercial narrowboat delivered its cargo in 1952. The British Transport Commission closed the top section of canal by the British Transport Commission Act 1962 (10 & 11 Eliz. 2. c. xlii). However, it was kept in water to supply the lower half of the canal and it remained navigable.

The Erewash Canal Preservation and Development Association, ECP&DA was formed in 1968 with the purpose of restoring the canal to full navigation; the achievement of this goal was celebrated with a boat rally in 1973 at the Great Northern Basin in Langley Mill.

The main line from Long Eaton to Langley Mill was one of seven stretches of canal, formally designated as remainder waterways, which were re-classified by the British Waterways Act 1983. Under the act, a total of 82 route miles (132 km) were upgraded to Cruising Waterway Standard.

== Shipley Wharf ==
At the turn of the twentieth century Shipley Wharf directly above Shipley Lock was very busy with the transhipment of coal from railway wagons which had descended an incline from the Shipley Collieries to narrowboats on the Erewash Canal. There was also a much earlier wagonway which connected the Shipley collieries to Shipley wharf between the completion of the Erewash Canal in 1779 and the completion of the Nutbrook Canal in 1796, from which point in time the Nutbrook Canal took this traffic. The incline in use at the end of the nineteenth century was originally built to connect the Shipley Collieries, then owned by the Miller-Mundy family with the Midland Railway's Erewash Valley railway line and was operated for this purpose between 1848 and 1870. Problems with the Nutbrook Canal's water supply instigated the re-laying of rails on the incline and its extension under the Midland Railway's Erewash Valley line and under the Midland Railway's Eastwood Colliery branch line, to Shipley Wharf. Coal was loaded into narrowboats here from 1895 until 1942. The sidings at the wharf were laid in a triangle. The coal wagons descended the incline under braking relying on gravity and accumulated momentum to carry them to the sidings where they were connected to an endless rope kept in motion by a stationary steam engine in the centre of the triangle. The endless rope went around three wheels at the corners of the triangle. One was sited on the Erewash Canal's aqueduct which spanned the Erewash River, a second was under the bridge which carried the Eastwood Colliery's branch line over the Shipley line and the third was alongside Eastwood Lock. Using this mechanism the colliery wagons were brought alongside the wharf and could be emptied directly into waiting narrowboats.

== Eastwood Colliery ==
Eastwood Colliery was situated on a narrow plot of land sandwiched between the Nottingham Canal and the Erewash Canal just above the Erewash Canal's Eastwood Lock. It was originally owned by Doctor Manson but was taken over by Barber Walker and Company. It was served by a branch line from the Great Northern Railway departing the main line close to Newthorpe and Greasley railway station. The colliery was also served by a branch line of the Midland Railway's Erewash Valley line departing the main line at Shipley Gate. Some of the embankments of the two branches are still in existence. The bridge abutments for the Midland Railway's wooden bridge which once stood directly below the Eastwood Lock can still be seen. The colliery was therefore, well served with transport options with the choice of two canals and two railways to export their coal. The Great Northern Railway branch crossed the Nottingham Canal using a swing bridge. The railway swing bridge no longer exists but the pedestrian bridge built next to it is still in use. Excessive water underground brought about the mine's closure in about 1884.

== The canal today ==
- 53°1′13″N 1°19′30″W
- 52°52′30″N 1°16′20″W

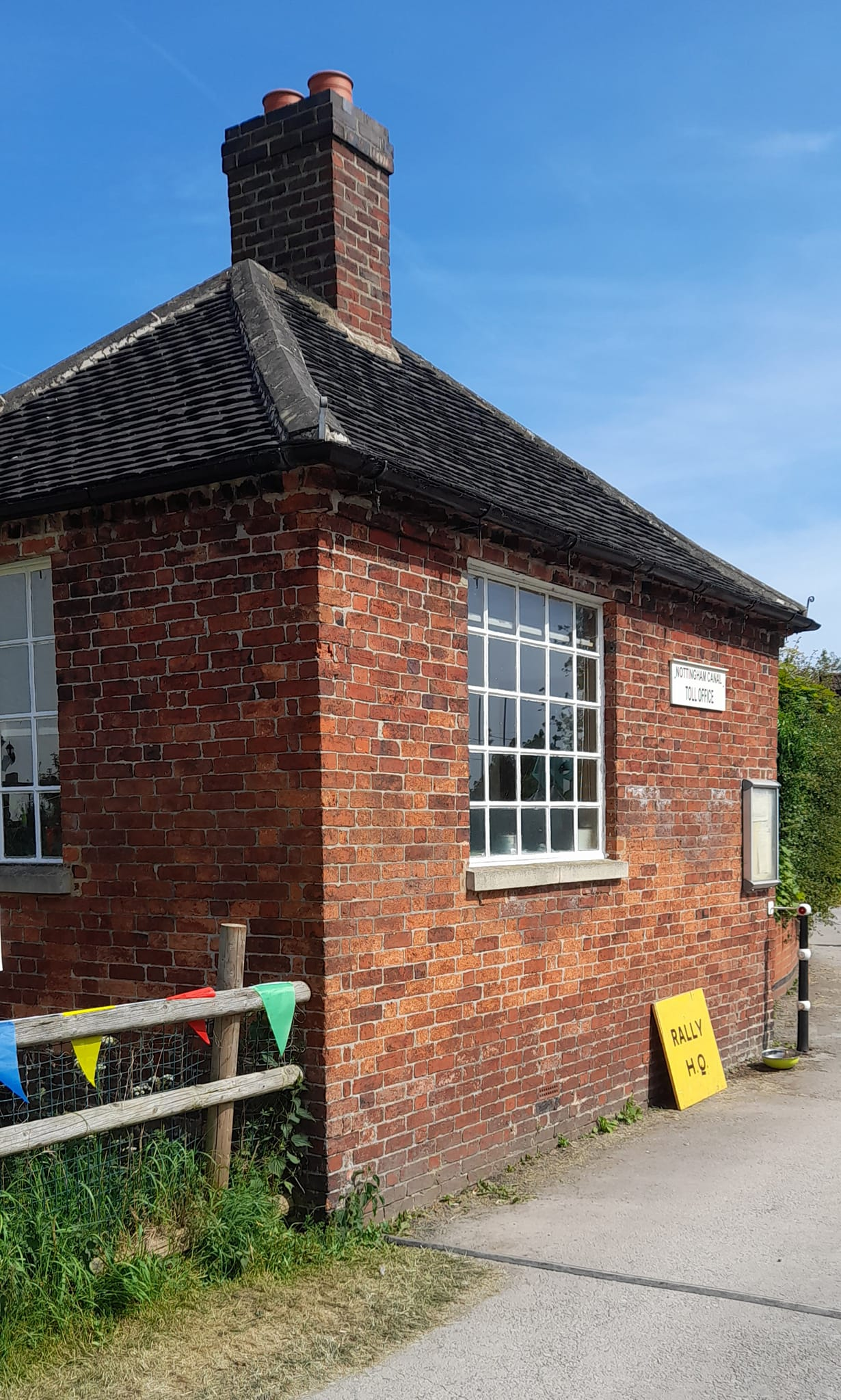
Canal Toll House, Langley Mill/Great Northern Basin, Erewash Canal

It starts from the River Trent at Trent Lock, then goes through Long Eaton. After Long Eaton it runs roughly parallel to the River Erewash, past Sandiacre and Ilkeston, crossing the Erewash near Eastwood. The canal finally ends at the Langley Mill (Great Northern) basin, where it joins the Nottingham Canal and the Cromford Canal (both currently in a state of abandonment).

In 1968 the Erewash Canal Preservation & Development Association (ECP&DA) was formed in response to a threat by the British Waterways Board to close the canal. One of the ECP&DA's achievements was the re-opening of the Great Northern Basin at Langley Mill. This canal basin was the point at which the Cromford, Erewash and Nottingham Canals met. The Langley Mill Boat Company formed in 1974 and based at the Great Northern Basin has cleared and put back into water a short section of the Cromford Canal connected to the basin. Today the Erewash Canal is fully open and is actively used by pleasure cruisers. As of 2006 the section of canal running through Long Eaton is oft frequented by pleasure craft; the factories which follow the canal along the Northern march of the town are no longer associated with the waterway, and fencing separates them from it.

However, these factories only block the western bank of the canal. The towpath, which follows the eastern bank, carries Route 67 of the National Cycle Network between the Lawrence Street access and Stanton Lock where the cycle route diverges to follow the Nutbrook Valley.

Near Ilkeston, the canal passes close to the disused but scenic Bennerley Viaduct.

The canal is also regularly restocked with fish for anglers, and along the eastern tow path dozens of anglers are often seen.

== Canal vandalism during lockdown ==
On 29 May 2020 the owners of the canal announced that locks along a section of the canal had been clamped open at weekends causing it to empty during the COVID-19 lockdown. The section between Dockholme Lock and Long Eaton Lock was affected. The owners said that the vandalism had killed many fish, left others with breathing problems and washed birds nests away. Derbyshire Police were investigating the vandalism.

== See also ==
- Canals of the United Kingdom
- History of the British canal system
