= Shipley Hall =

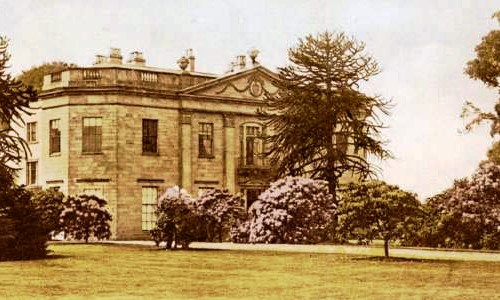
- Shipley Hall in the 1890s

- Location within Derbyshire

General information
- Location: Derbyshire, England
- Coordinates: 52.9937°N 1.3486°W
- Completed: 1799
- Demolished: 1943
- Client: Miller Mundy family

Design and construction
- Architect: William Linley

Shipley Hall was a country estate in Shipley, Derbyshire near Heanor and Ilkeston which now forms a Country Park.

== Early history ==
The Shipley estate is an ancient manor that was mentioned in the Domesday Book. From the 14th century the land was covered in extensive forest used for hunting, with a hunting lodge on Shipley Hill. From the 16th century, coal mining began to provide income for the owners.

Shipley Hall was built in 1700, and by 1722 coal mining was an important activity on the Shipley estate. The Hall became the property of the Miller-Mundy family who in around 1765 started running the mines themselves. The Nutbrook Canal opened in 1796 to serve the Shipley Colliery, and the income led to extensive development of the estate. The Hall was rebuilt in 1799 (the building in the above photo) to the design of William Linley of Doncaster, and the grounds were landscaped by William Emes, a follower of Capability Brown.

== 19th century ==
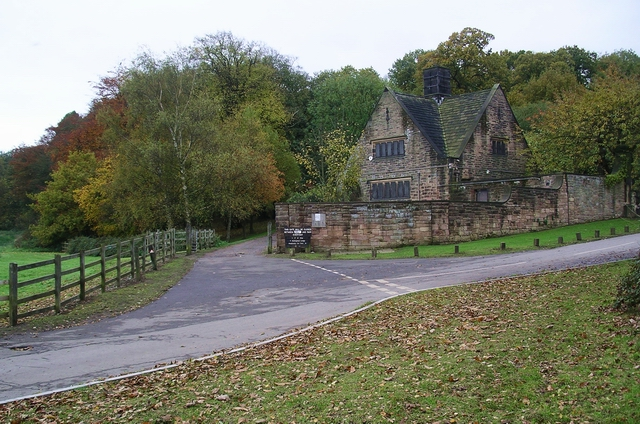
Derby Lodge

In the late 19th century, under Alfred Edward Miller Mundy, the colliery was becoming increasingly prosperous, especially with the opening of the Midland Railway. Miller Mundy was regarded as an excellent employer by the standards of the time, with a hands-on approach. Further developments were the building of a model dairy and farm, and the water tower to feed it, designed by W. E. Nesfield, a doubling of the size of the hall and the creation of a cricket ground. The Lodges and gates were designed by Sir Walter Tapper.

In 1887 there was a scandal when Captain Miller Mundy's wife, Ellen, ran off with Charles Chetwynd-Talbot the 19-year-old Earl of Shrewsbury, and then left the country with her three brothers who had skipped bail. They were accused of drawing lots to decide who would kill the eldest brother and heir of Alfreton Hall if he did not sign over outstanding inheritances.

Captain Mundy was able to entertain King Edward VII at one of the lavish house parties prior to World War I.

A cricket ground, created in 1899, is still functioning today, and as of 2018 is the home of Shipley Hall Cricket Club.

== 20th century ==
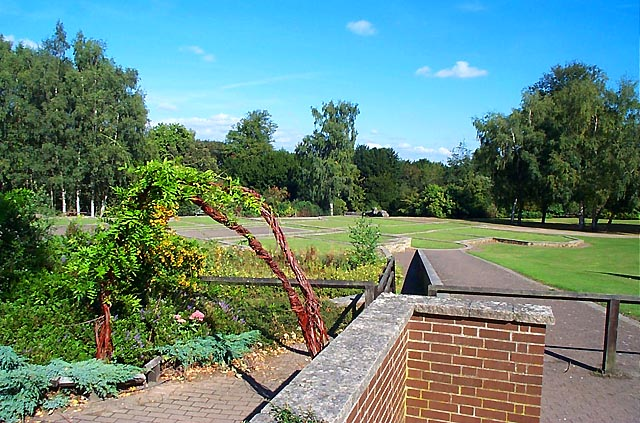
Shipley Hall's foundations are marked out on Shipley Hill

After Captain Miller Mundy died, the Hall was sold in 1922 to the Shipley Colliery Company, which his family had founded, who took over complete control of the mines and the family moved out mainly because life at the Hall was seriously affected by the noise and pollution of the colliery. The hall became seriously affected by subsidence due to the mining and was demolished in 1943.

The collieries were nationalised in 1947, becoming under control of the National Coal Board. The Woodside and Coppice coalpits, regarded as uneconomical, were closed in the 1960s, ending over 250 years of deep mining at Shipley. There was a residual legacy of spoil heaps, derelict buildings, polluted lakes and thirty abandoned mine shafts.

=== Shipley Country Park ===
In the late 1960s Derbyshire County Council decided to create a Country Park as a memorial to mining in the area.

The National Coal Board reclaimed land near the closed collieries by opencast methods between 1970 and 1974. Two years were spent contouring the site, planting trees, seeding fields and meadows, and building facilities for the public: Shipley Country Park opened to the public on 26 May 1976.

In the 1980s the County Council controversially agreed to the use of part of the park and a lake to form a theme park, initially as Britannia Park. That business closed soon after and the park re-opened as The American Adventure. The last incarnation of this park closed in 2007 and has been partly demolished. The area has now been developed upon with the new Shipley Lakeside development which contains the site of the former Woodside Colliery.

Shipley Country Park includes a visitor centre, children's play areas, a wildlife garden, wildlife and nature walks, a cafe, disabled access, bridleways, geocaching, cycling, fishing, jogging, a Parkrun, bird watching, photography, picnicking, dog walking, a cricket club and wayfaring.

== See also ==
- Listed buildings in Shipley, Derbyshire
