= Statute Law (Repeals) Act 1995 =

Act of the Parliament of the United Kingdom

Statute Law (Repeals) Act 1995 (Note: Section 3.)
- Act of Parliament
- Parliament of the United Kingdom
- Long title: An Act to promote the reform of the statute law by the repeal, in accordance with recommendations of the Law Commission and the Scottish Law Commission, of certain enactments which (except in so far as their effect is preserved) are no longer of practical utility, and to make other provision in connection with the repeal of those enactments.
- Citation: 1995 c. 44
- Territorial extent: England and Wales; Scotland; Northern Ireland; Isle of Man; (Note: Section 2.)

Dates
- Royal assent: 8 November 1995
- Commencement: 8 November 1995 (Note: Section 4(b) of the Interpretation Act 1978.)

Other legislation
- Amends: Unlawful Drilling Act 1819; Conveyancing (Scotland) Act 1874; Aden, Perim and Kuria Muria Islands Act 1967; See § Repealed enactments
- Repeals/revokes: See § Repealed enactments
- Amended by: Statute Law (Repeals) Act 2008
- Relates to: See Statute Law (Repeals) Act

Status: Amended

Text of statute as originally enacted

Revised text of statute as amended

Text of the Statute Law (Repeals) Act 1995 as in force today (including any amendments) within the United Kingdom, from legislation.gov.uk.

The Statute Law (Repeals) Act 1995 (c. 44) is an act of the Parliament of the United Kingdom.

== Background ==
The act implemented recommendations contained in the fifteenth report on statute law revision, by the Law Commission and the Scottish Law Commission.

== Provisions ==
=== Repealed enactments ===
Section 1(1) of the act repealed 481 enactments, listed in schedule 1 to the act, which is divided into six parts.

==== Part I: Bedfordshire, Nottingham, Nottinghamshire, Warwickshire and Derwent Valley Water Board ====
Citation	Short title	Description	Extent of repeal
Group 1 — Bedfordshire
35 Geo. 3. c. 87	Bedford Inclosure Act 1795	An Act for dividing, allotting, and inclosing the open and common fields, meadows, closes, commonable lands, pastures, commons, and waste grounds, within the several parishes of Saint Paul, Saint Peter, and Saint Cuthbert, in the town of Bedford, in the county of Bedford.	The whole act.
37 Geo. 3. c. 53	Bedford Inclosure Act 1797	An Act for dividing, allotting, and inclosing, the open and common fields, pastures, commons, and waste grounds, within the parish of Saint Mary, in the town of Bedford, in the county of Bedford.	The whole act.
43 Geo. 3. c. cxxviii	Bedford Improvement Act 1803	An Act for the improvement of the town of Bedford in the county of Bedford, and for rebuilding the bridge over the river Ouse in the said town.	The whole act.
50 Geo. 3. c. lxxxii	Bedford Improvement Act 1810	An Act for amending and enlarging the powers of the Act 43 Geo. 3. c. cxxviii.	The whole act.
55 Geo. 3. c. xxx	Tempsford Bridge Act 1815	An Act for rebuilding Tempsford Bridge in the county of Bedford.	The whole act.
16 & 17 Vict. c. cviii	Midland Railway (Leicester and Hitchin) Act 1853	Midland Railway (Leicester and Hitchin) Act 1853.	Section 47.
26 & 27 Vict. c. 32	Local Government Supplemental Act 1863	Local Government Supplemental Act 1863.	In the Schedule, the order relating to Bedford.
29 & 30 Vict. c. 107	Local Government Supplemental Act 1866 (No.4)	Local Government Supplemental Act 1866 (No.4).	In the Schedule, the order relating to Bedford.
40 & 41 Vict. c. xxii	Local Government Board's Provisional Orders Confirmation (Horbury &c.) Act 1877	Local Government Board's Provisional Orders Confirmation (Horbury &c.) Act 1877.	Sections 2 to 4.
40 & 41 Vict. c. xxii	Local Government Board's Provisional Orders Confirmation (Horbury &c.) Act 1877	Local Government Board's Provisional Orders Confirmation (Horbury &c.) Act 1877.	In the Schedule, the order relating to Luton.
53 & 54 Vict. c. clxxxviii	Electric Lighting Orders Confirmation (No.3) Act 1890	Electric Lighting Orders Confirmation (No.3) Act 1890.	In the Schedule, the Bedford Electric Lighting Order 1890.
56 & 57 Vict. c. viii	Tramways Orders (1892) Confirmation Act 1893	Tramways Orders (1892) Confirmation Act 1893.	In the Schedule, the Bedford and Kempston Tramways Order 1892.
58 & 59 Vict. c. lxvii	Electric Lighting Orders Confirmation (No.2) Act 1895	Electric Lighting Orders Confirmation (No.2) Act 1895.	In the Schedule, the Luton Corporation Electric Lighting Order 1895 except Articles 1, 2 and 5 and Schedule 1.
59 & 60 Vict. c. ccxxxvi	Local Government Board's Provisional Orders Confirmation (No.13) Act 1896	Local Government Board's Provisional Orders Confirmation (No.13) Act 1896.	In the Schedule, the Counties of Bedford and Huntingdon (Swineshead and Tilbrook) Order 1896.
60 & 61 Vict. c. lxxi	Local Government Board's Provisional Orders Confirmation (No.6) Act 1897	Local Government Board's Provisional Orders Confirmation (No.6) Act 1897.	In the Schedule, the Biggleswade Rural Order 1897.
60 & 61 Vict. c. lxxv	Local Government Board's Provisional Orders Confirmation (No.10) Act 1897	Local Government Board's Provisional Orders Confirmation (No.10) Act 1897.	In the Schedule, the Counties of Bedford and Hertford (Caddington &c.) Order 1897 and the County of Hertford (Holwell &c.) Order 1897.
63 & 64 Vict. c. cxcix	Tramways Orders Confirmation (No.2) Act 1900	Tramways Orders Confirmation (No.2) Act 1900.	In the Schedule, the Bedford Corporation Tramways Order 1900.
1 Edw. 7. c. ccxxxiii	Biggleswade Water Act 1901	Biggleswade Water Act 1901.	Sections 23, 25, 30 and 38.
1 Edw. 7. c. ccxxxiii	Biggleswade Water Act 1901	Biggleswade Water Act 1901.	Section 40(1) to (3).
1 Edw. 7. c. ccxxxiii	Biggleswade Water Act 1901	Biggleswade Water Act 1901.	Section 40(4) from "All works" to "Provided always that".
1 Edw. 7. c. ccxxxiii	Biggleswade Water Act 1901	Biggleswade Water Act 1901.	Section 40(6), (8) and (9).
1 Edw. 7. c. ccxxxiii	Biggleswade Water Act 1901	Biggleswade Water Act 1901.	Section 41(2), (3), (6) and (7).
1 Edw. 7. c. ccxxxiii	Biggleswade Water Act 1901	Biggleswade Water Act 1901.	Section 84.
2 Edw. 7. c. lxxxii	Local Government Board's Provisional Orders Confirmation (No.8) Act 1902	Local Government Board's Provisional Orders Confirmation (No.8) Act 1902.	In the Schedule, the Biggleswade Joint Hospital Order 1902.
2 Edw. 7. c. lxxxiii	Local Government Board's Provisional Orders Confirmation (No.9) Act 1902	Local Government Board's Provisional Orders Confirmation (No.9) Act 1902.	In the Schedule, the Linslade Order 1902.
2 Edw. 7. c. cvii	Bedford Corporation Water Act 1902	Bedford Corporation Water Act 1902.	The whole act.
1903 Cd. 1574.	Leighton Buzzard and Hitchin Light Railway Order 1903	Leighton Buzzard and Hitchin Light Railway Order 1903.	The whole order.
5 Edw. 7. c. cxciv	Tramways Orders Confirmation (No.2) Act 1905	Tramways Orders Confirmation (No.2) Act 1905.	In the Schedule, the Luton Corporation Tramways Order 1905 except Articles 1, 3, 4, 8(1) and 9(1) to (4) and (8).
6 Edw. 7. c. cxx	Local Government Board's Provisional Orders Confirmation (No.8) Act 1906	Local Government Board's Provisional Orders Confirmation (No.8) Act 1906.	In the Schedule, the Counties of Bedford and Hertford (Alteration of County Boundaries) Order 1906.
7 Edw. 7. c. clvi	Local Government Board's Provisional Orders Confirmation (No.6) Act 1907	Local Government Board's Provisional Orders Confirmation (No.6) Act 1907.	In the Schedule, the Dunstable (Extension) Order 1907.
SR&O 1910/837	Borough of Bedford Wards Order 1910	Borough of Bedford Wards Order 1910.	The whole order.
1 & 2 Geo. 5. c. lxxxvii	Luton Corporation Act 1911	Luton Corporation Act 1911.	Section 72.
—	Bedford (Alteration of Electoral Divisions) Order 1921	Bedford (Alteration of Electoral Divisions) Order 1921.	The whole order.
SR&O 1926/172	Bedford (Alteration of Electoral Divisions) Order 1926	Bedford (Alteration of Electoral Divisions) Order 1926.	The whole order.
17 & 18 Geo. 5. c. lxxxix	Bedford Corporation Act 1927	Bedford Corporation Act 1927.	Sections 9, 23, 27, 28, 36 to 62 and 64 to 77.
17 & 18 Geo. 5. c. lxxxix	Bedford Corporation Act 1927	Bedford Corporation Act 1927.	The Schedule.
SR&O 1927/1267	Biggleswade Joint Hospital Order 1927	Biggleswade Joint Hospital Order 1927.	The whole order.
SR&O 1928/729	Luton Tramways Extension of Time Order 1928	Luton Tramways Extension of Time Order 1928.	The whole order.
SR&O 1930/596	Luton Tramways Extension of Time Order 1930	Luton Tramways Extension of Time Order 1930.	The whole order.
SR&O 1931/660	Luton Tramways Extension of Time Order 1931	Luton Tramways Extension of Time Order 1931.	The whole order.
SR&O 1933/1231	South Bedfordshire Order 1933	South Bedfordshire Order 1933.	The whole order.
SR&O 1934/89	County of Bedford (Electoral Divisions) Order 1934	County of Bedford (Electoral Divisions) Order 1934.	The whole order.
SR&O 1934/101	North Bedfordshire Review Order 1934	North Bedfordshire Review Order 1934.	The whole order.
—	Order in Council dated 15 July 1935 for confirming a scheme altering wards etc. in Bedford	Order in Council dated 15 July 1935 for confirming a scheme altering wards etc. in Bedford.	The whole order.
26 Geo. 5 & 1 Edw. 8. c. viii	Ministry of Health Provisional Order Confirmation (Bedford Joint Hospital District) Act 1936	Ministry of Health Provisional Order Confirmation (Bedford Joint Hospital District) Act 1936.	The whole act.
SR&O 1936/281	Biggleswade Joint Hospital Amendment Order 1936	Biggleswade Joint Hospital Amendment Order 1936.	The whole order.
SR&O 1936/424	County of Bedford (Electoral Divisions) Order 1936	County of Bedford (Electoral Divisions) Order 1936.	The whole order.
1 Edw. 8 & 1 Geo. 6. c. vii	Ministry of Health Provisional Order Confirmation (Bedford) Act 1937	Ministry of Health Provisional Order Confirmation (Bedford) Act 1937.	The whole act.
SR&O 1938/987	Bedford Joint Hospital Amendment Order 1938	Bedford Joint Hospital Amendment Order 1938.	The whole order.
SR&O 1938/1266	Biggleswade Joint Hospital Amendment Order 1938	Biggleswade Joint Hospital Amendment Order 1938.	The whole order.
SI 1951/1071	Bedford Water Order 1951	Bedford Water Order 1951.	The whole order except Articles 1, 3, 4, 6 and 7.
SI 1951/2149	Bedford (Amendment of Local Enactments) Order 1951	Bedford (Amendment of Local Enactments) Order 1951.	The whole order.
4 & 5 Eliz. 2. c. lxiv	Bedford Corporation Act 1956	Bedford Corporation Act 1956.	The whole act.
SI 1956/855	Bedford Water Order 1956	Bedford Water Order 1956.	The whole order.
1961 c. xlii	Great Ouse Water Act 1961	Great Ouse Water Act 1961.	Sections 3, 5 to 7, 9 to 34 and 40.
1961 c. xlii	Great Ouse Water Act 1961	Great Ouse Water Act 1961.	Section 41(1) and (2).
1961 c. xlii	Great Ouse Water Act 1961	Great Ouse Water Act 1961.	Section 42(1) to (3).
1961 c. xlii	Great Ouse Water Act 1961	Great Ouse Water Act 1961.	Sections 43, 50, 53, 55, 56, 70, 73(3), 79 to 96, 114 to 130 and 132.
1961 c. xlii	Great Ouse Water Act 1961	Great Ouse Water Act 1961.	Section 133(1) and (4) to (6).
1961 c. xlii	Great Ouse Water Act 1961	Great Ouse Water Act 1961.	Section 134(2) to (9), (10)(b) and (12).
1961 c. xlii	Great Ouse Water Act 1961	Great Ouse Water Act 1961.	Sections 135, 136, 138 to 142, 145 and 147.
1961 c. xlii	Great Ouse Water Act 1961	Great Ouse Water Act 1961.	Schedules 1 to 4.
SI 1961/866	Bedford (Amalgamation of Funds) Order 1961	Bedford (Amalgamation of Funds) Order 1961.	The whole order.
1964 c. xxxiii	Bedford Corporation Act 1964	Bedford Corporation Act 1964.	The whole act.
SI 1964/169	Luton Order 1963	Luton Order 1963.	The whole order except Articles 1, 3, 4, 5, 51 and 57 and Schedule 5.
SI 1965/23	Counties of Bedford and Buckingham (Leighton-Linslade) Order 1965	Counties of Bedford and Buckingham (Leighton-Linslade) Order 1965.	The whole order.
SI 1965/138	County Borough of Luton (Wards) Order 1965	County Borough of Luton (Wards) Order 1965.	The whole order.
SI 1965/568	Great Ouse Water Order 1965	Great Ouse Water Order 1965.	The whole order.
SI 1966/69	Bedfordshire Water Board Order 1966	Bedfordshire Water Board Order 1966.	Articles 3 to 13, 15 to 18, 20(2) to (6) and 21 to 44.
SI 1966/69	Bedfordshire Water Board Order 1966	Bedfordshire Water Board Order 1966.	Part II of Schedule 1.
SI 1966/69	Bedfordshire Water Board Order 1966	Bedfordshire Water Board Order 1966.	Schedules 2, 3, 5 and 6.
SI 1967/1786	Bedford (Borough of Bedford) Order 1967	Bedford (Borough of Bedford) Order 1967.	The whole order.
1969 c. xlvi	Bedford Corporation Act 1969	Bedford Corporation Act 1969.	The whole act.
SI 1970/81	County of Bedford (Electoral Divisions) Order 1970	County of Bedford (Electoral Divisions) Order 1970.	The whole order.
SI 1971/2169	Great Ouse Water Order 1971	Great Ouse Water Order 1971.	Articles 8 to 13, 17, 18, 20 to 29, and 34 to 36.
SI 1971/2169	Great Ouse Water Order 1971	Great Ouse Water Order 1971.	The Schedule.
SI 1972/1924	Lee Valley Water Order 1972	Lee Valley Water Order 1972.	Articles 15(b) and 16.
SI 1972/1924	Lee Valley Water Order 1972	Lee Valley Water Order 1972.	In Part I of Schedule 3, the references to sections 6, 7, 14, 20 and 82 of the Great Ouse Water Act 1961.
SI 1972/1924	Lee Valley Water Order 1972	Lee Valley Water Order 1972.	In Part II of Schedule 3.

Citation	Short title	Description	Extent of repeal
Group 2 — Nottingham
7 Geo. 3. c. 36 Pr.	Nottingham Inclosure Act 1767	An Act for dividing and inclosing the open fields, meadows, common pastures and commonable lands lying south of the turnpike road leading from Nottingham to Alfreton within the liberties and townships of Lenton and Radford in the county of Nottingham.	The whole act.
36 Geo. 3. c. 152	Nottingham Roads Act 1796	An Act for raising, maintaining, and keeping in repair the road from the north end of the bridge, commonly called the Old Trent Bridge, to the west end of Saint Mary's churchyard by way of Hollow Stone, in the parish of Saint Mary, in the town of Nottingham, and for erecting and maintaining such and so many flood bridges upon the said road as may be necessary to carry off the flood water, and for widening and improving the entrance into the town of Nottingham by way of Hollow Stone.	The whole act except section 52.
36 Geo. 3. c. 114 Pr.	Nottingham (Lenton and Radford) Inclosure Act 1796	An Act for dividing and inclosing the forest, commons and waste lands within the liberties and townships of Lenton and Radford in the county of Nottingham.	The whole act.
6 Will. 4. c. xlv	Nottingham Cemetery Act 1836	An Act for establishing a general cemetery in the town and county of the town of Nottingham.	The whole act.
2 & 3 Vict. c. 28	Nottingham (West Croft and Burton Leys) Inclosure Act 1839	An Act for inclosing certain lands called the West Croft and Burton Leys, in the parish of Saint Mary in the town and county of the town of Nottingham.	The whole act.
2 & 3 Vict. c. lxvi	Nottingham (West Croft) Canal Act 1839	An Act for forming a canal and other works within and near certain lands called the West Croft, in the parish of Saint Mary in the town and county of the town of Nottingham.	The whole act except sections 6 to 9 and 11 to 15.
2 & 3 Vict. c. 32	Nottingham (St Mary) Inclosure Act 1839	An Act for inclosing, allotting, and improving certain open fields in the parish of Saint Mary in the town and county of the town of Nottingham.	The whole act except sections 28, 32, 53 and 55 to 58.
7 & 8 Vict. c. 7	Nottingham Inclosure Act 1844	An Act for altering and amending the Act 2 & 3 Vict. c. 28.	The whole act.
7 & 8 Vict. c. lvii	Nottingham Improvement Act 1844	An Act for amending the provisions of the Act 2 & 3 Vict. c. lxvi; and for making certain improvements within the said town of Nottingham.	The whole act.
8 & 9 Vict. c. xix	Nottingham Waterworks Act 1845	Nottingham Waterworks Act 1845.	The whole act except sections 7, 40, 43, 45 and 46.
8 & 9 Vict. c. 7	St Mary's Nottingham Inclosure Act 1845	An Act for inclosing lands in the parish of Saint Mary in the town and county of the town of Nottingham.	The whole act except sections 53, 54, 59, 70, 97 to 99 and 173 to 175.
16 & 17 Vict. c. xi	Nottingham Gas Act 1853	Nottingham Gas Act 1853.	The whole act.
17 & 18 Vict. c. x	Nottingham Waterworks Amendment Act 1854	Nottingham Waterworks Amendment Act 1854.	The whole act.
21 & 22 Vict. c. ix	Nottingham Gas Amendment Act 1858	Nottingham Gas Amendment Act 1858.	The whole act.
23 & 24 Vict. c. 118	Local Government Supplemental Act 1860 (No.2)	Local Government Supplemental Act 1860 (No.2).	In the Schedule, the order relating to Nottingham.
26 & 27 Vict. c. 32	Local Government Supplemental Act 1863	Local Government Supplemental Act 1863.	In the Schedule, the order relating to Nottingham.
26 & 27 Vict. c. xli	Nottingham Gas Amendment Act 1863	Nottingham Gas Amendment Act 1863.	The whole act.
27 & 28 Vict. c. cix	Nottingham Gas Act 1864	Nottingham Gas Act 1864.	The whole act.
28 & 29 Vict. c. 108	Local Government Supplemental Act 1865 (No.5)	Local Government Supplemental Act 1865 (No.5).	In the Schedule, the order relating to Nottingham.
30 & 31 Vict. c. x	Nottingham Improvement Act 1867	Nottingham Improvement Act 1867.	The whole act.
30 & 31 Vict. c. lxxv	Wilford Bridge Act 1867	Wilford Bridge Act 1867.	The whole act.
33 & 34 Vict. c. cxiv	Local Government Supplemental Act 1870	Local Government Supplemental Act 1870.	In the Schedule, the order relating to Nottingham.
35 & 36 Vict. c. xcii	Local Government Board's Provisional Orders Confirmation Act 1872	Local Government Board's Provisional Orders Confirmation Act 1872.	In the Schedule, the order relating to Nottingham.
35 & 36 Vict. c. cv	Nottingham and Leen District Sewerage Act 1872	Nottingham and Leen District Sewerage Act 1872.	The whole act.
36 & 37 Vict. c. lxxxii	Local Government Board's Provisional Orders Confirmation Act 1873 (No.2)	Local Government Board's Provisional Orders Confirmation Act 1873 (No.2).	In the Schedule, the two orders relating to Nottingham.
36 & 37 Vict. c. ccv	Nottingham Gas Act 1873	Nottingham Gas Act 1873.	The whole act.
37 & 38 Vict. c. i	Local Government Board's Provisional Orders Confirmation Act 1874	Local Government Board's Provisional Orders Confirmation Act 1874.	In the Schedule, the order relating to Nottingham.
37 & 38 Vict. c. cxxxvi	Nottingham Corporation (Gas) Act 1874	Nottingham Corporation (Gas) Act 1874.	The whole act.
37 & 38 Vict. c. cxxxvii	Nottingham Waterworks Act 1874	Nottingham Waterworks Act 1874.	The whole act.
37 & 38 Vict. c. cxciv	Nottingham Improvement Act 1874	Nottingham Improvement Act 1874.	The whole act except— (a) section 1; (b) section 88 from "The Markets and Fairs Clauses Act" to "limits of the borough"; (c) sections 89 to 93 and 110.
38 & 39 Vict. c. ccxi	Local Government Board's Provisional Orders Confirmation (Abingdon, Barnsley &c.) Act 1875	Local Government Board's Provisional Orders Confirmation (Abingdon, Barnsley &c.) Act 1875.	In the Schedule, the order relating to Nottingham.
39 & 40 Vict. c. xvi	Local Government Board's Provisional Orders Confirmation (Briton Ferry, &c.) Act 1876	Local Government Board's Provisional Orders Confirmation (Briton Ferry, &c.) Act 1876.	In the Schedule, the two orders relating to Nottingham.
39 & 40 Vict. c. cxcviii	Local Government Board's Provisional Orders Confirmation (Bingley, &c.) Act 1876	Local Government Board's Provisional Orders Confirmation (Bingley, &c.) Act 1876.	In the Schedule, the order relating to Nottingham and the Nottingham and Leen District Sewerage Board.
39 & 40 Vict. c. ccxxxv	Local Government Board's Provisional Orders Confirmation (Artisans and Labourers Dwellings) Act 1876	Local Government Board's Provisional Orders Confirmation (Artisans and Labourers Dwellings) Act 1876.	In the Schedule, the order relating to Nottingham.
40 & 41 Vict. c. xxxi	Nottingham Borough Extension Act 1877	Nottingham Borough Extension Act 1877.	The whole act except sections 1, 3, 55, 56(2)(D) and 59.
40 & 41 Vict. c. 10	Chesterfield Estate (Nottingham Sewage) Act 1877	Chesterfield Estate (Nottingham Sewage) Act 1877.	The whole act.
40 & 41 Vict. c. lxxvii	Local Government Board's Provisional Orders Confirmation (Altrincham, &c.) Act 1877	Local Government Board's Provisional Orders Confirmation (Altrincham, &c.) Act 1877.	In the Schedule, the order relating to Nottingham.
40 & 41 Vict. c. cxxiv	Tramways Orders Confirmation Act 1877	Tramways Orders Confirmation Act 1877.	In the Schedule, the Nottingham and District Tramways Order 1877 except Articles 1, 3, 4 and 30.
41 & 42 Vict. c. xlv	Nottingham Waterworks Act 1878	Nottingham Waterworks Act 1878.	The whole act.
41 & 42 Vict. c. xci	Nottingham Improvement Act 1878	Nottingham Improvement Act 1878.	The whole act except sections 1 and 6 and Schedule 1.
42 & 43 Vict. c. xi	Nottingham Waterworks Act 1879	Nottingham Waterworks Act 1879.	The whole act except sections 1, 2 and 4 so far as unrepealed.
42 & 43 Vict. c. cciv	Nottingham Improvement Act 1879	Nottingham Improvement Act 1879.	The whole act except sections 1, 3, 26, 29, 30, 37, 39 and 47 to 52 and Schedules 2 and 3.
43 & 44 Vict. c. ccviii	Nottingham Corporation Loans Act 1880	Nottingham Corporation Loans Act 1880.	The whole act.
44 & 45 Vict. c. cii	Local Government Board's Provisional Orders Confirmation (Birmingham, Tame, and Rea, &c.) Act 1881	Local Government Board's Provisional Orders Confirmation (Birmingham, Tame, and Rea, &c.) Act 1881.	In the Schedule, the order relating to Nottingham.
45 & 46 Vict. c. lix	Local Government Board's Provisional Orders Confirmation (Artisans and Labourers Dwellings) Act 1882	Local Government Board's Provisional Orders Confirmation (Artisans and Labourers Dwellings) Act 1882.	The whole act.
45 & 46 Vict. c. lxii	Local Government Board's Provisional Orders Confirmation (No.4) Act 1882	Local Government Board's Provisional Orders Confirmation (No.4) Act 1882.	In the Schedule, the order relating to Nottingham.
45 & 46 Vict. c. ccxvii	Nottingham Corporation Act 1882	Nottingham Corporation Act 1882.	The whole act except sections 1, 2 and 78.
46 & 47 Vict. c. lxxviii	Nottingham Corporation Act 1883	Nottingham Corporation Act 1883.	The whole act except sections 1, 3, 13, 14, 19, 26 so far as unrepealed and 30.
47 & 48 Vict. c. cxii	Tramways Orders Confirmation (No.1) Act 1884	Tramways Orders Confirmation (No.1) Act 1884.	In the Schedule, the Nottingham Tramways Order 1884.
47 & 48 Vict. c. ccxiv	Local Government Board's Provisional Orders Confirmation (No.7) Act 1884	Local Government Board's Provisional Orders Confirmation (No.7) Act 1884.	In the Schedule, Articles 2 and 3 of the order relating to Nottingham.
50 & 51 Vict. c. xcix	Local Government Board's Provisional Orders Confirmation (No.3) Act 1887	Local Government Board's Provisional Orders Confirmation (No.3) Act 1887.	In the Schedule, the order relating to Nottingham.
52 & 53 Vict. c. cxiii	Local Government Board's Provisional Orders Confirmation (No.11) Act 1889	Local Government Board's Provisional Orders Confirmation (No.11) Act 1889.	In the Schedule, the order relating to Nottingham.
53 & 54 Vict. c. cxci	Electric Lighting Orders Confirmation (No.6) Act 1890	Electric Lighting Orders Confirmation (No.6) Act 1890.	In the Schedule, the Nottingham Electric Lighting Order 1890.
55 & 56 Vict. c. lxviii	Local Government Board's Provisional Orders Confirmation Act 1892	Local Government Board's Provisional Orders Confirmation Act 1892.	In the Schedule, the order relating to Nottingham.
55 & 56 Vict. c. ccxxiii	Local Government Board's Provisional Orders Confirmation (No.12) Act 1892	Local Government Board's Provisional Orders Confirmation (No.12) Act 1892.	In the Schedule, the Nottingham Order 1892.
57 & 58 Vict. c. xxi	Local Government Board's Provisional Orders Confirmation (No.3) Act 1894	Local Government Board's Provisional Orders Confirmation (No.3) Act 1894.	In the Schedule, the Nottingham Order 1894.
57 & 58 Vict. c. clxxviii	Nottingham Corporation Act 1894	Nottingham Corporation Act 1894.	The whole act.
59 & 60 Vict. c. ci	Local Government Board's Provisional Orders Confirmation (No.6) Act 1896	Local Government Board's Provisional Orders Confirmation (No.6) Act 1896.	Section 2.
59 & 60 Vict. c. ci	Local Government Board's Provisional Orders Confirmation (No.6) Act 1896	Local Government Board's Provisional Orders Confirmation (No.6) Act 1896.	In the Schedule, the Basford (Selston) Order 1896.
59 & 60 Vict. c. clxxi	Local Government Board's Provisional Orders Confirmation (No.22) Act 1896	Local Government Board's Provisional Orders Confirmation (No.22) Act 1896.	In the Schedule, the Nottingham Order 1896.
60 & 61 Vict. c. cc	Nottingham Corporation Water Act 1897	Nottingham Corporation Water Act 1897.	The whole act except sections 1, 2, 4, 6, 9, 11 to 14 and 25 to 27 and the Schedule.
60 & 61 Vict. c. ccxxxviii	Nottingham Improvement Act 1897	Nottingham Improvement Act 1897.	The whole act except sections 1 and 17.
61 & 62 Vict. c. lxxi	Nottingham Corporation Act 1898	Nottingham Corporation Act 1898.	The whole act.
61 & 62 Vict. c. lxxxi	Local Government Board's Provisional Orders Confirmation (No.8) Act 1898	Local Government Board's Provisional Orders Confirmation (No.8) Act 1898.	The whole act.
62 & 63 Vict. c. ci	Nottingham Corporation Act 1899	Nottingham Corporation Act 1899.	The whole act except sections 1, 3, 28, 29 and 32 and Schedule 1.
62 & 63 Vict. c. cclxxiii	Tramways Orders Confirmation (No.2) Act 1899	Tramways Orders Confirmation (No.2) Act 1899.	In the Schedule, the Ilkeston Corporation Tramways Order 1899.
63 & 64 Vict. c. cxxxii	Nottingham Corporation Act 1900	Nottingham Corporation Act 1900.	The whole act.
2 Edw. 7. c. ccxxxiii	Nottingham Corporation Act 1902	Nottingham Corporation Act 1902.	The whole act except sections 1, 3, 5(3) and (7), 6(4) and (5), 18, 21 and 23.
3 Edw. 7. c. ccii	Nottinghamshire and Derbyshire Tramways Act 1903	Nottinghamshire and Derbyshire Tramways Act 1903.	The whole act except— (a) sections 1 and 3; (b) section 101(1) to (7), (10) and (15); (c) section 102(1), (2), (4), (5), (10) and (13); (d) section 104(1), (3), (13), (15), (17) and (18).
5 Edw. 7. c. clxxv	Nottingham Corporation Act 1905	Nottingham Corporation Act 1905.	The whole act except sections 1, 3, 23(2) and (5), 28, 29, 33 and the Schedule.
6 Edw. 7. c. lx	Nottinghamshire and Derbyshire Tramways Act 1906	Nottinghamshire and Derbyshire Tramways Act 1906.	The whole act except sections 1 and 8.
8 Edw. 7. c. ci	Nottinghamshire and Derbyshire Tramways Act 1908	Nottinghamshire and Derbyshire Tramways Act 1908.	The whole act except— (a) sections 1, 2 and 46; (b) section 52(1), (3), (5), (6), (9), (10) and (13) to (16).
10 Edw. 7 & 1 Geo. 5. c. xliv	Nottingham Corporation Act 1910	Nottingham Corporation Act 1910.	The whole act.
1 & 2 Geo. 5. c. lxxxviii	Nottinghamshire and Derbyshire Tramways Act 1911	Nottinghamshire and Derbyshire Tramways Act 1911.	The whole act.
3 & 4 Geo. 5. c. cxiii	Nottingham Corporation Act 1913	Nottingham Corporation Act 1913.	The whole act except— (a) sections 1 and 4; (b) section 22(2) and (3); (c) section 23(1) to (5) and (9); (d) section 26(1), (2), (4), (5) and (7).
5 & 6 Geo. 5. c. lxvi	Nottingham Corporation (Trent Navigation Transfer) Act 1915	Nottingham Corporation (Trent Navigation Transfer) Act 1915.	Sections 4, 6, 7, 11, 18 to 21, 23, 25 to 27, 29 to 31 and 34.
5 & 6 Geo. 5. c. lxvi	Nottingham Corporation (Trent Navigation Transfer) Act 1915	Nottingham Corporation (Trent Navigation Transfer) Act 1915.	Section 28 except as it applies to the Trent Navigation Act 1906.
7 & 8 Geo. 5. c. xi	Nottinghamshire and Derbyshire Tramways Act 1917	Nottinghamshire and Derbyshire Tramways Act 1917.	The whole act.
10 & 11 Geo. 5. c. lxvi	Nottingham Corporation Act 1920	Nottingham Corporation Act 1920.	The whole act except— (a) sections 1 and 4; (b) section 16(1), (2), (4), (5), (8) and (10).
12 & 13 Geo. 5. c. xv	Nottingham Corporation (Trent Navigation) Act 1922	Nottingham Corporation (Trent Navigation) Act 1922.	The whole act except sections 1, 3 and 8.
12 & 13 Geo. 5. c. xxviii	Nottinghamshire and Derbyshire Tramways Act 1922	Nottinghamshire and Derbyshire Tramways Act 1922.	The whole act.
13 & 14 Geo. 5. c. iv	Ministry of Health Provisional Orders Confirmation (No.1) Act 1923	Ministry of Health Provisional Orders Confirmation (No.1) Act 1923.	In the Schedule, the Nottingham Order 1923.
13 & 14 Geo. 5. c. c	Nottingham Corporation Act 1923	Nottingham Corporation Act 1923.	The whole act except sections 1, 4, 16, 25, 26, 28(2), 29 and 138.
15 & 16 Geo. 5. c. cix	Nottingham Corporation Act 1925	Nottingham Corporation Act 1925.	The whole act except— (a) sections 1, 3 and 4; (b) section 15(2), (3), (5), (7) and (8); (c) section 16; (d) section 26(1) to (7) and (11); (e) section 28(1) to (7) and (11).
18 & 19 Geo. 5. c. xciii	Nottinghamshire and Derbyshire Traction Act 1928	Nottinghamshire and Derbyshire Traction Act 1928.	The whole act.
19 & 20 Geo. 5. c. lxi	Nottingham Corporation Act 1929	Nottingham Corporation Act 1929.	The whole act except sections 1, 3 to 9, 13, 14(2), 32(2), 38 and 69.
20 & 21 Geo. 5. c. cxiv	Nottingham Corporation Act 1930	Nottingham Corporation Act 1930.	The whole act.
21 & 22 Geo. 5. c. lxvii	Public Works Facilities Scheme (Nottingham Corporation) Confirmation Act 1931	Public Works Facilities Scheme (Nottingham Corporation) Confirmation Act 1931.	In the Schedule, the Nottingham Corporation (Waterworks) Scheme 1931 except— (a) Articles 1, 3 and 4; (b) Article 8 from "Provided that" to "may require."; (c) Articles 9, 10, 16 and 17(5) and (6).
22 & 23 Geo. 5. c. lxxx	Nottingham Corporation Act 1932	Nottingham Corporation Act 1932.	The whole act.
23 & 24 Geo. 5. c. xxxi	Nottinghamshire and Derbyshire Traction Company (Trolley Vehicles) Order Confirmation Act 1933	Nottinghamshire and Derbyshire Traction Company (Trolley Vehicles) Order Confirmation Act 1933.	The whole act.
24 & 25 Geo. 5. c. li	Nottingham Corporation (Trolley Vehicles) Order Confirmation Act 1934	Nottingham Corporation (Trolley Vehicles) Order Confirmation Act 1934.	The whole act.
25 & 26 Geo. 5. c. cxix	Nottingham Corporation Act 1935	Nottingham Corporation Act 1935.	The whole act.
26 Geo. 5 & 1 Edw. 8. c. xxviii	Nottinghamshire and Derbyshire Traction Act 1936	Nottinghamshire and Derbyshire Traction Act 1936.	The whole act.
1 & 2 Geo. 6. c. xcv	Nottingham Corporation Act 1938	Nottingham Corporation Act 1938.	Sections 2, 5 to 16, 18, 20 to 22, 23(1), 25, 26, 31, 34, 36, 37, 39, 40, 43, 45 to 59, 61 to 69, 71 to 78, 80, 82, 83, 86, 88.
1 & 2 Geo. 6. c. xcv	Nottingham Corporation Act 1938	Nottingham Corporation Act 1938.	The Schedule.
10 & 11 Geo. 6. c. xi	Nottinghamshire and Derbyshire Traction Act 1947	Nottinghamshire and Derbyshire Traction Act 1947.	The whole act.
10 & 11 Geo. 6. c. xxxvi	Nottingham Corporation Act 1947	Nottingham Corporation Act 1947.	The whole act except— (a) sections 1, 3, 4, 13, 15(2), 16, 17, 24 and 25; (b) section 47 as it extends, applies and amends section 32(2) of the Nottingham Corporation Act 1929 and sections 29, 44 and 81 of the Nottingham Corporation Act 1938; (c) sections 48, 51 and 53.
15 & 16 Geo. 6 & 1 Eliz. 2. c. xxxiii	Nottingham Corporation Act 1952	Nottingham Corporation Act 1952.	The whole act except sections 1, 3, 5, 6, 15(3), 21, 25, 27(2), 28, 30, 32 and 37 to 59.
15 & 16 Geo. 6 & 1 Eliz. 2. c. xlv	Nottinghamshire and Derbyshire Traction Act 1952	Nottinghamshire and Derbyshire Traction Act 1952.	The whole act.
SI 1953/1152	Nottingham Water Order 1953	Nottingham Water Order 1953.	Articles 3, 4 and 5.
SI 1953/1152	Nottingham Water Order 1953	Nottingham Water Order 1953.	The Schedule.
SI 1957/1638	Nottingham Water Order 1957	Nottingham Water Order 1957.	The whole order except Articles 1, 2 and 8.
SI 1957/2003	Nottingham Water (No.2) Order 1957	Nottingham Water (No.2) Order 1957.	The whole order.
SI 1958/1593	Nottingham Water Order 1958	Nottingham Water Order 1958.	Articles 3, 4 and 7.
SI 1958/1593	Nottingham Water Order 1958	Nottingham Water Order 1958.	The Schedule.
SI 1959/583	Leicester and Nottingham Water Order 1959	Leicester and Nottingham Water Order 1959.	The whole order.
SI 1960/418	Nottingham Water Order 1960	Nottingham Water Order 1960.	The whole order.
SI 1966/63	Nottingham Water Order 1966	Nottingham Water Order 1966.	The whole order.
SI 1966/1389	Nottingham (River Derwent) Water Order 1966	Nottingham (River Derwent) Water Order 1966.	Articles 4, 5, 7 and 11.
SI 1966/1389	Nottingham (River Derwent) Water Order 1966	Nottingham (River Derwent) Water Order 1966.	Schedule 1 except so far as it refers to paragraph 10 of Schedule 3 to the Water Act 1945.
SI 1966/1389	Nottingham (River Derwent) Water Order 1966	Nottingham (River Derwent) Water Order 1966.	Schedule 2.
1971 c. vii	Nottingham Corporation Act 1971	Nottingham Corporation Act 1971.	The whole act.

Citation	Short title	Description	Extent of repeal
Group 3 — Nottinghamshire
9 Geo. 3. c. 62	Nottingham Shire Hall Act 1769	An Act to rebuild the shire hall of the county of Nottingham; and for using the guildhall of the town and county of Nottingham for the purposes of a shire hall in the meantime.	The whole act.
13 Geo. 3. c. 96 Pr.	Newark Charities Act 1773	An Act for the sale of certain charity estates therein mentioned, and to apply the money to arise therefrom in the building of a town hall and shambles in the town of Newark-upon-Trent; and in the purchasing of lands and hereditaments for enlarging the churchyard of the said town, and for opening the avenues thereto; and for laying out the residue of the money in purchasing other lands, to be settled to the charitable uses therein mentioned.	The whole act.
3 & 4 Will. 4. c. i	Broxtowe Riot Damages Act 1832	An Act for raising money to pay compensation for damages committed within the Hundred of Broxtowe in the county of Nottingham during the late riots and tumults therein.	The whole act.
15 & 16 Vict. c. i	Mansfield Gas Act 1852	Mansfield Gas Act 1852.	The whole Act except sections 4 and 32.
29 & 30 Vict. c. xxxi	Newark Gas Act 1866	Newark Gas Act 1866.	Section 38.
33 & 34 Vict. c. ii	Mansfield Water Act 1870	Mansfield Water Act 1870.	Sections 8, 20, 21, 27, 41 and 42.
37 & 38 Vict. c. lxxxvii	Gas and Water Orders Confirmation Act 1874	Gas and Water Orders Confirmation Act 1874.	In the Schedule, the Retford Gas Order 1874 except Articles 1, 7 and 15 and the Schedule.
38 & 39 Vict. c. lxiii	Worksop Waterworks Act 1875	Worksop Waterworks Act 1875.	Section 56.
38 & 39 Vict. c. clxxv	Local Government Board's Provisional Orders Confirmation (Aberdare, &c.) Act 1875	Local Government Board's Provisional Orders Confirmation (Aberdare, &c.) Act 1875.	In the Schedule, the order relating to Hucknall Torkard.
40 & 41 Vict. c. cxxxi	Gas and Water Orders Confirmation (Abingdon, &c.) Act 1877	Gas and Water Orders Confirmation (Abingdon, &c.) Act 1877.	In the Schedule, the Mansfield Gas Order 1877.
41 & 42 Vict. c. clxxii	Sutton-in-Ashfield Local Board Gas Act 1878	Sutton-in-Ashfield Local Board Gas Act 1878.	The whole act.
41 & 42 Vict. c. cxcvii	Mansfield Commissioners Gas Act 1878	Mansfield Commissioners Gas Act 1878.	The whole act.
46 & 47 Vict. c. cxxxvi	Local Government Board's Provisional Orders Confirmation (No.5) Act 1883	Local Government Board's Provisional Orders Confirmation (No.5) Act 1883.	In the Schedule, the order relating to Hucknall-under-Huthwaite.
47 & 48 Vict. c. lxxv	Local Government Board's Provisional Orders Confirmation (Poor Law) (No.10) Act 1884	Local Government Board's Provisional Orders Confirmation (Poor Law) (No.10) Act 1884.	In the Schedule, the order relating to Marnham and South Clifton.
48 & 49 Vict. c. i	Local Government Board's Provisional Orders Confirmation Act 1885	Local Government Board's Provisional Orders Confirmation Act 1885.	In the Schedule, the order relating to Mansfield.
51 & 52 Vict. c. cviii	Water Orders Confirmation (No.2) Act 1888	Water Orders Confirmation (No.2) Act 1888.	In the Schedule, the Mansfield Water Order 1888.
54 & 55 Vict. c. cxxii	Newark Corporation Act 1891	Newark Corporation Act 1891.	Section 78(1) to (3), (5) and (6).
58 & 59 Vict. c. xci	Local Government Board's Provisional Orders Confirmation (No.12) Act 1895	Local Government Board's Provisional Orders Confirmation (No.12) Act 1895.	In the Schedule, the Counties of Derby and Nottingham (Kirkby-in-Ashfield and Pinxton) Order 1895 and the County of Nottingham (Bole and West Burton) Order 1895.
59 Vict. Sess. 2. c. ii	Gas and Water Orders Confirmation Act 1895 Session 2	Gas and Water Orders Confirmation Act 1895 Session 2.	In the Schedule, Articles 30 and 41 of the Newark Gas Order 1895.
61 & 62 Vict. c. xxxi	Local Government Board's Provisional Orders Confirmation (No.1) Act 1898	Local Government Board's Provisional Orders Confirmation (No.1) Act 1898.	In the Schedule, the Hucknall Torkard Order 1898.
62 & 63 Vict. c. xxxiv	Electric Lighting Orders Confirmation (No.1) Act 1899	Electric Lighting Orders Confirmation (No.1) Act 1899.	In the Schedule, the Worksop Electric Lighting Order 1899.
62 & 63 Vict. c. xxxv	Electric Lighting Orders Confirmation (No.2) Act 1899	Electric Lighting Orders Confirmation (No.2) Act 1899.	In the Schedule, the Mansfield Corporation Electric Lighting Order 1899.
62 & 63 Vict. c. cxxxvi	Electric Lighting Orders Confirmation (No.11) Act 1899	Electric Lighting Orders Confirmation (No.11) Act 1899.	In the Schedule, the East Retford Electricity Supply Order 1899.
63 & 64 Vict. c. xxii	Electric Lighting Orders Confirmation (No.2) Act 1900	Electric Lighting Orders Confirmation (No.2) Act 1900.	In the Schedule, the Newark Electric Lighting Order 1900.
1901 Cd. 651.	Mansfield and District Light Railways Order 1901	Mansfield and District Light Railways Order 1901.	The whole order.
2 Edw. 7. c. lxviii	Electric Lighting Orders Confirmation (No.3) Act 1902	Electric Lighting Orders Confirmation (No.3) Act 1902.	In the Schedule, the Hucknall Torkard Electric Lighting Order 1902.
4 Edw. 7. c. xlix	Kirkby-in-Ashfield Urban District Council (Gas) Act 1904	Kirkby-in-Ashfield Urban District Council (Gas) Act 1904.	The whole Act except sections 1 and 10 and the Schedule.
4 Edw. 7. c. clxxix	Electric Lighting Orders Confirmation (No.8) Act 1904	Electric Lighting Orders Confirmation (No.8) Act 1904.	In the Schedule, the Sutton-in-Ashfield Urban District Electric Lighting Order 1904.
5 Edw. 7. c. ci	Mansfield Corporation Act 1905	Mansfield Corporation Act 1905.	Section 64.
6 Edw. 7. c. ci	Local Government Board's Provisional Orders Confirmation (No.2) Act 1906	Local Government Board's Provisional Orders Confirmation (No.2) Act 1906.	In the Schedule, the Sutton-in-Ashfield Order 1906.
7 Edw. 7. c. liv	Electric Lighting Orders Confirmation (No.1) Act 1907	Electric Lighting Orders Confirmation (No.1) Act 1907.	In the Schedule, the Newark Electric Lighting (Amendment) Order 1907.
7 Edw. 7. c. cxiv	Electric Lighting Orders Confirmation (No.3) Act 1907	Electric Lighting Orders Confirmation (No.3) Act 1907.	Section 6.
7 Edw. 7. c. cxiv	Electric Lighting Orders Confirmation (No.3) Act 1907	Electric Lighting Orders Confirmation (No.3) Act 1907.	Section 8 so far as it repeals the Mansfield Woodhouse Electric Lighting Order 1904.
7 Edw. 7. c. cxiv	Electric Lighting Orders Confirmation (No.3) Act 1907	Electric Lighting Orders Confirmation (No.3) Act 1907.	In the Schedule, the Mansfield (Extension to Mansfield Woodhouse) Electric Lighting Order 1907.
1907 Cd. 3487.	Mansfield and District Light Railways (Extensions) Order 1907	Mansfield and District Light Railways (Extensions) Order 1907.	The whole order.
8 Edw. 7. c. cxlix	Local Government Board's Provisional Orders Confirmation (No.9) Act 1908	Local Government Board's Provisional Orders Confirmation (No.9) Act 1908.	In the Schedule, Articles 1(1), (3) and (4) and 3 to 12 of the Sutton-in-Ashfield Order 1908.
9 Edw. 7. c. xxvi	Worksop Waterworks Act 1909	Worksop Waterworks Act 1909.	Section 14.
9 Edw. 7. c. xxvi	Worksop Waterworks Act 1909	Worksop Waterworks Act 1909.	The Schedule.
10 Edw. 7 & 1 Geo. 5. c. xl	Worksop Urban District Council Act 1910	Worksop Urban District Council Act 1910.	The whole act.
9 & 10 Geo. 5. c. xxxix	Newark Gas Act 1919	Newark Gas Act 1919.	Sections 53, 54, 58, 63 and 65.
1920 Cmd. 355.	Mansfield and District Light Railways (Extensions) Order 1920	Mansfield and District Light Railways (Extensions) Order 1920.	The whole order.
SR&O 1921/567	Newark Gas (Charges) Order 1921	Newark Gas (Charges) Order 1921.	The whole order.
SR&O 1924/609	Mansfield Corporation Gas Order 1924	Mansfield Corporation Gas Order 1924.	The whole Order except— (a) Articles 1, 3, 8(1), 30(1), (4) and (5) and 31(1), (5) and (6); (b) Schedule 1.
15 & 16 Geo. 5. c. xcviii	Mansfield Corporation Act 1925	Mansfield Corporation Act 1925.	Section 24.
SR&O 1926/243	Newark Gas Order 1926	Newark Gas Order 1926.	The whole Order except Articles 1 and 10 and Schedule 2.
SR&O 1926/243	Newark Gas Order 1926	Newark Gas Order 1926.	Schedule 2 so far as it saves— (a) section 38 of the Newark Gas Act 1866; (b) Articles 30 and 41 of the Newark Gas Order 1895; (c) sections 53, 54, 58, 63 and 65 of the Newark Gas Act 1919; (d) the Newark Gas (Charges) Order 1921.
SR&O 1926/1665	Mansfield and District Light Railways (Extensions &c.) Order 1926	Mansfield and District Light Railways (Extensions &c.) Order 1926.	The whole order.
19 & 20 Geo. 5. c. lxxvi	Mansfield District Traction Act 1929	Mansfield District Traction Act 1929.	The whole act.
SR&O 1934/1418	Mansfield Gas Order 1934	Mansfield Gas Order 1934.	The whole order.
1 Edw. 8 & 1 Geo. 6. c. xxxvi	Mansfield District Traction Act 1937	Mansfield District Traction Act 1937.	The whole act.
SR&O 1939/723	Sutton-in-Ashfield Gas Order 1939	Sutton-in-Ashfield Gas Order 1939.	The whole order.
SR&O 1939/749	Mansfield Gas Order 1939	Mansfield Gas Order 1939.	The whole order.
SI 1958/2280	Newark Corporation Water Order 1958	Newark Corporation Water Order 1958.	Articles 3 to 5.
SI 1958/2280	Newark Corporation Water Order 1958	Newark Corporation Water Order 1958.	Article 7.
SI 1958/2280	Newark Corporation Water Order 1958	Newark Corporation Water Order 1958.	The Schedule.
SI 1961/2143	Worksop Water Order 1961	Worksop Water Order 1961.	Articles 6 and 7.
SI 1961/2143	Worksop Water Order 1961	Worksop Water Order 1961.	The Schedule.
SI 1962/1281	Mansfield Water Order 1962	Mansfield Water Order 1962.	Articles 3, 4 and 7.
SI 1962/1281	Mansfield Water Order 1962	Mansfield Water Order 1962.	The Schedule.
SI 1963/1332	Central Nottinghamshire Water Board Order 1963	Central Nottinghamshire Water Board Order 1963.	Articles 3 and 25.

Citation	Short title	Description	Extent of repeal
Group 4 — Warwickshire
6 & 7 Will. & Mar. c. 1 Pr.	Warwick Fire Rebuilding, &c. Act 1694	An Act for rebuilding the town of Warwick and for determining differences touching houses burnt or demolished by reason of the late dreadful fire there.	The whole act.
54 Geo. 3. c. xlv	Warwickshire Judges' Lodgings Act 1814	An Act for providing a convenient house, with suitable accommodations, for His Majesty's judges at the assizes for the county of Warwick.	The whole act.
7 Geo. 4. c. iv	Stratford-upon-Avon Bridge Act 1826	An Act for maintaining and repairing the bridge over the river Avon, at or near Stratford-upon-Avon, in the county of Warwick, and for widening and improving the approaches thereto.	The whole act.
15 & 16 Vict. c. 69	Public Health Supplemental Act 1852 (No.2)	Public Health Supplemental Act 1852 (No.2).	Section 5.
20 & 21 Vict. c. lxvii	Stratford-upon-Avon Gas Act 1857	Stratford-upon-Avon Gas Act 1857.	The whole act.
26 & 27 Vict. c. xxxiii	Rugby Waterworks Act 1863	Rugby Waterworks Act 1863.	Sections 24 and 39.
30 & 31 Vict. c. xvii	Stratford-upon-Avon Gas Act 1867	Stratford-upon-Avon Gas Act 1867.	The whole act.
34 & 35 Vict. c. clxxxviii	Sewage Utilisation Supplemental Act 1871	Sewage Utilisation Supplemental Act 1871.	Section 2.
34 & 35 Vict. c. clxxxviii	Sewage Utilisation Supplemental Act 1871	Sewage Utilisation Supplemental Act 1871.	In the Schedule, the order relating to Hillmorton.
35 & 36 Vict. c. clviii	Tramways Orders Confirmation Act 1872 (No.4)	Tramways Orders Confirmation Act 1872 (No.4).	In the Schedule, the Leamington and Warwick Tramways Order 1872.
39 & 40 Vict. c. cci	Local Government Board's Provisional Orders Confirmation (Bath &c.) Act 1876	Local Government Board's Provisional Orders Confirmation (Bath &c.) Act 1876.	In the Schedule, the order relating to Warwick.
41 & 42 Vict. c. cix	Local Government Board's Provisional Orders Confirmation (Belper Union &c.) Act 1878	Local Government Board's Provisional Orders Confirmation (Belper Union &c.) Act 1878.	In the Schedule, the order relating to the Rugby Rural Sanitary Authority.
42 & 43 Vict. c. xliii	Local Government Board's Provisional Orders Confirmation (Ashton-under-Lyne &c.) Act 1879	Local Government Board's Provisional Orders Confirmation (Ashton-under-Lyne &c.) Act 1879.	In the Schedule, the orders relating to the Rugby and Southam Rural Sanitary Authorities.
42 & 43 Vict. c. cxix	Stratford-upon-Avon Borough Act 1879	Stratford-upon-Avon Borough Act 1879.	Sections 2 to 29, 31, 32, 34 to 53, 55 to 77, 80, 81, 87 to 90, 93 to 95, 97 and 98.
42 & 43 Vict. c. cxix	Stratford-upon-Avon Borough Act 1879	Stratford-upon-Avon Borough Act 1879.	Schedules 2 and 3.
42 & 43 Vict. c. cxciii	Tramways Orders Confirmation Act 1879	Tramways Orders Confirmation Act 1879.	In the Schedule, the Leamington and Warwick Tramways Order 1879.
44 & 45 Vict. c. i	Local Government Board's Provisional Orders Confirmation (Godalming &c.) Act 1881	Local Government Board's Provisional Orders Confirmation (Godalming &c.) Act 1881.	In the Schedule, the Stratford-upon-Avon Order 1881.
45 & 46 Vict. c. c	Water Orders Confirmation Act 1882	Water Orders Confirmation Act 1882.	In the Schedule, Articles 13 and 14 of the Kenilworth Water Order 1882.
45 & 46 Vict. c. cxxxviii	Tramways Orders Confirmation (No.1) Act 1882	Tramways Orders Confirmation (No.1) Act 1882.	In the Schedule, the Leamington and Warwick Tramways (Amendment) Order 1882.
45 & 46 Vict. c. ccxxx	East Warwickshire Waterworks Act 1882	East Warwickshire Waterworks Act 1882.	Sections 2, 4, 5, 7 to 24, 38, 55 and 73.
46 & 47 Vict. c. xc	Local Government Board's Provisional Orders Confirmation (No.6) Act 1883	Local Government Board's Provisional Orders Confirmation (No.6) Act 1883.	In the Schedule, the order relating to Stratford-upon-Avon.
47 & 48 Vict. c. ccx	Local Government Board's Provisional Orders Confirmation (No.4) Act 1884	Local Government Board's Provisional Orders Confirmation (No.4) Act 1884.	In the Schedule, the Warwick Joint Hospital District Order 1884.
48 & 49 Vict. c. ci	Local Government Board's Provisional Orders Confirmation (No.4) Act 1885	Local Government Board's Provisional Orders Confirmation (No.4) Act 1885.	In the Schedule, the order relating to Atherstone Rural Sanitary Authority.
51 & 52 Vict. c. lxi	Local Government Board's Provisional Orders Confirmation (No.3) Act 1888	Local Government Board's Provisional Orders Confirmation (No.3) Act 1888.	In the Schedule, the Stratford-upon-Avon Order 1888.
53 & 54 Vict. c. ccxxxvii	Local Government Board's Provisional Orders Confirmation (No.11) Act 1890	Local Government Board's Provisional Orders Confirmation (No.11) Act 1890.	The whole act.
55 & 56 Vict. c. cxcviii	Local Government Board's Provisional Orders Confirmation (No.7) Act 1892	Local Government Board's Provisional Orders Confirmation (No.7) Act 1892.	In the Schedule, the Warwick Joint Hospital District Order 1892.
58 & 59 Vict. c. lxxxvi	Local Government Board's Provisional Orders Confirmation (No.5) Act 1895	Local Government Board's Provisional Orders Confirmation (No.5) Act 1895.	In the Schedule, the County of Warwick (Stoneton) Order 1895.
59 & 60 Vict. c. xxix	Local Government Board's Provisional Orders Confirmation (No.4) Act 1896	Local Government Board's Provisional Orders Confirmation (No.4) Act 1896.	In the Schedule, the Stratford-upon-Avon Order 1896.
59 & 60 Vict. c. lxxv	Local Government Board's Provisional Orders Confirmation (No.3) Act 1896	Local Government Board's Provisional Orders Confirmation (No.3) Act 1896.	In the Schedule, the County of Gloucester (Batsford) Order 1896 and the County of Warwick (Oldberrow) Order 1896.
59 & 60 Vict. c. civ	Local Government Board's Provisional Orders Confirmation (No.9) Act 1896	Local Government Board's Provisional Orders Confirmation (No.9) Act 1896.	In the Schedule, the Warwick Joint Hospital District Order 1896.
60 & 61 Vict. c. ccxiv	East Warwickshire Waterworks Act 1897	East Warwickshire Waterworks Act 1897.	The whole act.
62 & 63 Vict. c. xxi	Nuneaton and Chilvers Coton Urban District Council Waterworks Act 1899	Nuneaton and Chilvers Coton Urban District Council Waterworks Act 1899.	Sections 2 to 4 and 17.
62 & 63 Vict. c. xxxvi	Electric Lighting Orders Confirmation (No.4) Act 1899	Electric Lighting Orders Confirmation (No.4) Act 1899.	In the Schedule, the Rugby Electric Lighting Order 1899.
62 & 63 Vict. c. cxxv	Electric Lighting Order Confirmation (No.18) Act 1899	Electric Lighting Order Confirmation (No.18) Act 1899.	The whole act.
62 & 63 Vict. c. ccxxvi	Worcestershire County Council (Transfer of the Parish of Yardley) Act 1899	Worcestershire County Council (Transfer of the Parish of Yardley) Act 1899.	The whole act.
63 & 64 Vict. c. xlix	Electric Lighting Orders Confirmation (No.5) Act 1900	Electric Lighting Orders Confirmation (No.5) Act 1900.	In the Schedule, the Nuneaton and Chilvers Coton Electric Lighting Order 1900.
63 & 64 Vict. c. cxcix	Tramways Orders Confirmation (No.2) Act 1900	Tramways Orders Confirmation (No.2) Act 1900.	In the Schedule, the Warwick Tramways Order 1900.
1 Edw. 7. c. xxxix	Electric Lighting Orders Confirmation (No.4) Act 1901	Electric Lighting Orders Confirmation (No.4) Act 1901.	In the Schedule, the Stratford-upon-Avon Electric Lighting Order 1901.
1 Edw. 7. c. clxxxi	Tramways Orders Confirmation (No.2) Act 1901	Tramways Orders Confirmation (No.2) Act 1901.	In the Schedule, the Leamington Tramways Order 1901.
1 Edw. 7. c. cclxix	Rugby Water and Improvement Act 1901	Rugby Water and Improvement Act 1901.	Sections 3, 5 to 7, 9, 10, 43 to 61, 65, 68, 69, 71, 72, 75 to 78, 80, 81, 83 to 85, 87, 88, 90 to 112, 115 to 128, 134 to 144, 147 to 150, 155 to 168 and 170 to 179.
1 Edw. 7. c. cclxix	Rugby Water and Improvement Act 1901	Rugby Water and Improvement Act 1901.	Schedules 1 and 2.
2 Edw. 7. c. lxxxi	Local Government Board's Provisional Orders Confirmation (No.5) Act 1902	Local Government Board's Provisional Orders Confirmation (No.5) Act 1902.	In the Schedule, the Stratford-upon-Avon Order 1902.
3 Edw. 7. c. lxi	Local Government Board's Provisional Orders Confirmation (No.4) Act 1903	Local Government Board's Provisional Orders Confirmation (No.4) Act 1903.	Section 2 as it applies to Stratford-upon-Avon. In the Schedule, the Stratford-upon-Avon Order 1903.
4 Edw. 7. c. xxvii	Nuneaton and Chilvers Coton Urban District Council (Prevention of Floods) Act 1904	Nuneaton and Chilvers Coton Urban District Council (Prevention of Floods) Act 1904.	The whole Act except sections 1 and 13 to 15.
5 Edw. 7. c. lxxv	Local Government Board's Provisional Orders Confirmation (No.9) Act 1905	Local Government Board's Provisional Orders Confirmation (No.9) Act 1905.	In the Schedule, the Rugby Joint Hospital Order 1905.
5 Edw. 7. c. cxiii	Electric Lighting Orders Confirmation (No.5) Act 1905	Electric Lighting Orders Confirmation (No.5) Act 1905.	Section 6.
5 Edw. 7. c. cxiii	Electric Lighting Orders Confirmation (No.5) Act 1905	Electric Lighting Orders Confirmation (No.5) Act 1905.	In the Schedule, the Stratford-upon-Avon Electric Lighting Order 1901 (Amendment) Order 1905.
6 Edw. 7. c. cxvii	Education Board Provisional Orders Confirmation (Kesteven &c.) Act 1906	Education Board Provisional Orders Confirmation (Kesteven &c.) Act 1906.	In the Schedule, the order relating to Warwickshire.
7 Edw. 7. c. cliii	Local Government Board's Provisional Orders Confirmation (No.3) Act 1907	Local Government Board's Provisional Orders Confirmation (No.3) Act 1907.	In the Schedule, the Rugby Joint Hospital Order 1907.
2 & 3 Geo. 5. c. cxxxv	Local Government Board's Provisional Orders Confirmation (No.9) Act 1912	Local Government Board's Provisional Orders Confirmation (No.9) Act 1912.	In the Schedule, the Stratford-upon-Avon Order 1912.
9 & 10 Geo. 5. c. xliii	Nuneaton Corporation Act 1919	Nuneaton Corporation Act 1919.	The whole act.
11 & 12 Geo. 5. c. xci	Nuneaton Corporation Act 1921	Nuneaton Corporation Act 1921.	Sections 2 to 7, 9, 11, 15, 22, 28 to 30, 32 and 34 to 52.
11 & 12 Geo. 5. c. xci	Nuneaton Corporation Act 1921	Nuneaton Corporation Act 1921.	The Schedule.
13 & 14 Geo. 5. c. lxxv	Rugby Urban District Council Act 1923	Rugby Urban District Council Act 1923.	The whole Act except sections 1, 4, 5, 8, 9, 30, 35 to 38, 40 and 168 and Schedule 1.
14 & 15 Geo. 5. c. xx	Ministry of Health Provisional Order Confirmation (Stratford-upon-Avon Extension) Act 1924	Ministry of Health Provisional Order Confirmation (Stratford-upon-Avon Extension) Act 1924.	The whole act.
19 & 20 Geo. 5. c. xliv	Leamington and Warwick Traction Act 1929	Leamington and Warwick Traction Act 1929.	The whole act.
SR&O 1929/336	Rugby Urban (Public Health) Order 1929	Rugby Urban (Public Health) Order 1929.	The whole order.
SR&O 1929/438	Rugby Rural (Urban Powers) Order 1929	Rugby Rural (Urban Powers) Order 1929.	The whole order.
21 & 22 Geo. 5. c. ix	Ministry of Health Provisional Order Confirmation (Gloucestershire, Warwickshire and Worcestershire) Act 1931	Ministry of Health Provisional Order Confirmation (Gloucestershire, Warwickshire and Worcestershire) Act 1931.	The whole act.
SR&O 1931/261	Borough of Nuneaton (Extension) Order 1931	Borough of Nuneaton (Extension) Order 1931.	The whole order.
SR&O 1931/270	Borough of Warwick Order 1931	Borough of Warwick Order 1931.	The whole order.
—	Rugby Urban District (Extension) Order 1931	Rugby Urban District (Extension) Order 1931.	The whole order.
SR&O 1932/104	County of Warwick (Electoral Divisions) Order 1932	County of Warwick (Electoral Divisions) Order 1932.	The whole order.
SR&O 1932/185	Warwickshire Review Order 1932	Warwickshire Review Order 1932.	The whole order.
SR&O 1932/677	Order in Council consequential upon the grant of a charter of incorporation to Rugby	Order in Council consequential upon the grant of a charter of incorporation to Rugby.	The whole order.
23 & 24 Geo. 5. c. v	Ministry of Health Provisional Order Confirmation (Rugby Joint Hospital District) Act 1933	Ministry of Health Provisional Order Confirmation (Rugby Joint Hospital District) Act 1933.	The whole act.
23 & 24 Geo. 5. c. xli	Rugby Corporation Act 1933	Rugby Corporation Act 1933.	The whole act.
23 & 24 Geo. 5. c. xci	Ministry of Health Provisional Order Confirmation (Warwick) Act 1933	Ministry of Health Provisional Order Confirmation (Warwick) Act 1933.	The whole act.
SR&O 1933/339	Borough of Rugby (Public Health &c.) Order 1933	Borough of Rugby (Public Health &c.) Order 1933.	The whole order.
25 & 26 Geo. 5. c. iv	Ministry of Health Provisional Order Confirmation (Leicester and Warwick) Act 1935	Ministry of Health Provisional Order Confirmation (Leicester and Warwick) Act 1935.	The whole act.
25 & 26 Geo. 5. c. vi	Ministry of Health Provisional Order Confirmation (Gloucester and Warwick) Act 1935	Ministry of Health Provisional Order Confirmation (Gloucester and Warwick) Act 1935.	The whole act.
SR&O 1935/1099	Warwick Joint Hospital Amendment Order 1935	Warwick Joint Hospital Amendment Order 1935.	The whole order.
1 & 2 Geo. 6. c. ix	Ministry of Health Provisional Order Confirmation (Nuneaton Extension) Act 1938	Ministry of Health Provisional Order Confirmation (Nuneaton Extension) Act 1938.	The whole act.
SR&O 1938/387	Warwick Joint Hospital Amendment Order 1938	Warwick Joint Hospital Amendment Order 1938.	The whole order.
SI 1954/1653	Borough of Nuneaton (Food) Order 1954	Borough of Nuneaton (Food) Order 1954.	The whole order.
4 Eliz. 2. c. xii	Nuneaton Corporation Act 1955	Nuneaton Corporation Act 1955.	The whole act.
4 & 5 Eliz. 2. c. lxxviii	Rugby Corporation Act 1956	Rugby Corporation Act 1956.	The whole act.
SI 1956/446	Warwickshire and Coventry (Boundaries) Order 1956	Warwickshire and Coventry (Boundaries) Order 1956.	The whole order.
SI 1956/1229	Leamington Water Order 1956	Leamington Water Order 1956.	The whole Order except Articles 1 to 3.
SI 1960/154	North East Warwickshire Water Board Order 1960	North East Warwickshire Water Board Order 1960.	The whole Order except Articles 1, 3, 14(2), 39(1) and 40 and Schedules 5 and 7.
SI 1961/2193	Rugby Joint Water Board Order 1961	Rugby Joint Water Board Order 1961.	The whole Order except Articles 1, 2, 14(2) and 21(1) and Schedule 4.
SI 1962/348	North East Warwickshire Water Board Order 1962	North East Warwickshire Water Board Order 1962.	The whole order.
SI 1962/637	Borough of Rugby (Wards) Order 1962	Borough of Rugby (Wards) Order 1962.	The whole order.
SI 1962/1282	Rugby (Amendment of Local Enactment) Order 1962	Rugby (Amendment of Local Enactment) Order 1962.	The whole order.
SI 1963/38	South Warwickshire Water Board Order 1963	South Warwickshire Water Board Order 1963.	The whole Order except Articles 1, 2, 22 and 23(1) and Schedule 4.
SI 1964/680	North East Warwickshire Water Board Order 1964	North East Warwickshire Water Board Order 1964.	Article 3 and the Schedule.
SI 1966/472	South Warwickshire Water Board (Clifford Chambers) Water Order 1966	South Warwickshire Water Board (Clifford Chambers) Water Order 1966.	The Schedule except so far as it refers to paragraph 10 of Schedule 3 to the Water Act 1945.
SI 1966/799	South Warwickshire Water Board (Wellesbourne Mountford Airfield) Water Order 1966	South Warwickshire Water Board (Wellesbourne Mountford Airfield) Water Order 1966.	Articles 3(2) and 4 and the Schedule.
SI 1967/375	Rugby and South Warwickshire Water Order 1966	Rugby and South Warwickshire Water Order 1966.	The whole Order except Articles 1 to 3, 4(1), 6, 8 to 12, 13(1) to (5) and 26 to 28.
SI 1968/166	Rugby Joint Water Board (Charges) Order 1968	Rugby Joint Water Board (Charges) Order 1968.	The whole order.
SI 1969/166	South Warwickshire Water Board (Charges) Order 1969	South Warwickshire Water Board (Charges) Order 1969.	The whole order.
SI 1969/919	South Warwickshire Water Board Order 1969	South Warwickshire Water Board Order 1969.	The whole order.
SI 1969/1227	Rugby Joint Water Board Order 1969	Rugby Joint Water Board Order 1969.	The whole order.
SI 1969/1483	South Warwickshire Water Board (Offchurch) Water Order 1969	South Warwickshire Water Board (Offchurch) Water Order 1969.	The whole Order except Articles 1, 2 and 7 and the Schedule.
SI 1969/1672	South Warwickshire Water Board and Coventry (Variation of Limits) Order 1969	South Warwickshire Water Board and Coventry (Variation of Limits) Order 1969.	The whole order.
1970 c. vi	Warwickshire County Council Act 1970	Warwickshire County Council Act 1970.	The whole act.
SI 1970/995	North East Warwickshire Water Board Order 1970	North East Warwickshire Water Board Order 1970.	The whole order.
SI 1971/430	North East Warwickshire Water Board (Charges) Order 1971	North East Warwickshire Water Board (Charges) Order 1971.	The whole order.
SI 1971/1509	Coventry Birmingham and Rugby Water Order 1971	Coventry Birmingham and Rugby Water Order 1971.	The whole Order except Articles 1, 2 and 4 and Schedule 2.
SI 1972/1270	Rugby Joint Water Board Order 1972	Rugby Joint Water Board Order 1972.	The whole order.
SI 1973/587	North East Warwickshire Water Board (Charges) Order 1973	North East Warwickshire Water Board (Charges) Order 1973.	The whole order.
SI 1973/2127	Rugby Joint Water Board (Extension of Operation of Byelaws) Order 1973	Rugby Joint Water Board (Extension of Operation of Byelaws) Order 1973.	The whole order.

Citation	Short title	Description	Extent of repeal
Group 5 — Derwent Valley Water Board
62 & 63 Vict. c. cclxix	Derwent Valley Water Act 1899	Derwent Valley Water Act 1899.	Sections 2, 3, 5 to 23, 28, 32 to 36, 38 to 44, 48, 49, 51, 56, 57, 61, 63, 77 to 80, 83, 89, 94, 96, 97, 101, 107, 111 to 114, 116, 117 and 119.
62 & 63 Vict. c. cclxix	Derwent Valley Water Act 1899	Derwent Valley Water Act 1899.	Section 121 from "Incorporation of Acts;" to "county council;".
62 & 63 Vict. c. cclxix	Derwent Valley Water Act 1899	Derwent Valley Water Act 1899.	Section 129.
62 & 63 Vict. c. cclxix	Derwent Valley Water Act 1899	Derwent Valley Water Act 1899.	Schedules 1 and 2.
1 Edw. 7. c. lxxx	Derwent Valley Water Act 1901	Derwent Valley Water Act 1901.	Sections 2, 3, 5 to 8, 12 to 14, 16 to 18, 21, 26 to 29, 31 to 33 and 35.
4 Edw. 7. c. cxcvi	Derwent Valley Water Act 1904	Derwent Valley Water Act 1904.	Sections 2, 3, 5, 7, 8, 14, 15, 17, 19, 20, 31, 33 to 35, 37 to 40, 43, 44, 46, 47 and 49.
4 Edw. 7. c. cxcvi	Derwent Valley Water Act 1904	Derwent Valley Water Act 1904.	The Schedule.
9 Edw. 7. c. lxiii	Derwent Valley Water Act 1909	Derwent Valley Water Act 1909.	The whole Act except sections 1 and 3 to 6.
2 & 3 Geo. 5. c. xxxviii	Derwent Valley Water Act 1912	Derwent Valley Water Act 1912.	The whole Act except sections 1, 2 and 3.
10 & 11 Geo. 5. c. clxv	Derwent Valley Water Act 1920	Derwent Valley Water Act 1920.	Sections 2, 3, 5 to 10, 12 to 17, 19, 22 to 24, 31, 32(12), 38 to 45, 49 and 53.
14 & 15 Geo. 5. c. lxxiii	Ministry of Health Provisional Orders Confirmation (No.7) Act 1924	Ministry of Health Provisional Orders Confirmation (No.7) Act 1924.	In the Schedule, the Derwent Valley Water Order 1924.
17 & 18 Geo. 5. c. lxx	Derwent Valley Water Act 1927	Derwent Valley Water Act 1927.	Sections 2, 3, 5 to 7, 9 to 12, 14, 17 to 19, 22 and 24.
25 & 26 Geo. 5. c. cv	Derwent Valley Water Act 1935	Derwent Valley Water Act 1935.	Sections 2, 3, 8, 9, 14, 16 to 20 and 22.
1 & 2 Geo. 6. c. lxii	Derwent Valley Water Act 1938	Derwent Valley Water Act 1938.	Sections 2, 4, 5, 7 to 9, 11, 13, 15, 16, 17(1), 19 to 23, 26 and 27.
7 & 8 Geo. 6. c. xviii	Derwent Valley Water Act 1944	Derwent Valley Water Act 1944.	Sections 2, 3, 7, 8, 10, 11(1), 12, 14 to 16, 25(1), 39, 40, 53, 55 to 60, 63 and 64.
SI 1949/324	Derwent Valley Water Order 1949	Derwent Valley Water Order 1949.	The whole order.
SI 1955/1174	Derwent Valley Water Order 1955	Derwent Valley Water Order 1955.	Articles 3, 4, 5(2) and 6 to 9.
SI 1955/1174	Derwent Valley Water Order 1955	Derwent Valley Water Order 1955.	The Schedule except so far as it refers to paragraph 10 of Schedule 3 to the Water Act 1945.
SI 1957/330	Derwent Valley Water Order 1956	Derwent Valley Water Order 1956.	Articles 3, 7 to 9, 11 and 12(2).
SI 1959/1794	Derwent Valley Water Board (Drought) Order 1959	Derwent Valley Water Board (Drought) Order 1959.	The whole order.
SI 1965/1174	Derwent Valley Water Order 1965	Derwent Valley Water Order 1965.	The whole order.
SI 1969/1526	Derwent Valley Water Order 1969	Derwent Valley Water Order 1969.	The whole order.

==== Part II: Overseas Jurisdiction ====
Citation	Short title	Description	Extent of repeal
Group 1 — Associated States
1969 c. 29	Tanzania Act 1969	Tanzania Act 1969.	Section 6(3)(a) and (4).
1971 c. 77	Immigration Act 1971	Immigration Act 1971.	In section 8(4)(b), the words "associated state,".
1973 c. 27	Bahamas Independence Act 1973	Bahamas Independence Act 1973.	In section 3(1)(a), the words "or an associated state".
1973 c. 27	Bahamas Independence Act 1973	Bahamas Independence Act 1973.	Section 7(3).
1978 c. 15	Solomon Islands Act 1978	Solomon Islands Act 1978.	Section 6(4).
1979 c. 43	Crown Agents Act 1979	Crown Agents Act 1979.	In section 7, the words "or associated state".
1979 c. 43	Crown Agents Act 1979	Crown Agents Act 1979.	In Schedule 3, in Part I, paragraph 1, the words "or associated state".
1979 c. 60	Zimbabwe Act 1979	Zimbabwe Act 1979.	In section 4(5), the words "of any associated state or".
1980 c. 2	Papua New Guinea, Western Samoa and Nauru (Miscellaneous Provisions) Act 1980	Papua New Guinea, Western Samoa and Nauru (Miscellaneous Provisions) Act 1980.	Section 1(3).
1980 c. 67	Anguilla Act 1980	Anguilla Act 1980.	Section 1(1).
1980 c. 67	Anguilla Act 1980	Anguilla Act 1980.	Section 2(2).
1981 c. 52	Belize Act 1981	Belize Act 1981.	Section 4(5).
1981 c. 52	Belize Act 1981	Belize Act 1981.	In section 5(2), the words "or an associated state".
1981 c. 53	Deep Sea Mining (Temporary Provisions) Act 1981	Deep Sea Mining (Temporary Provisions) Act 1981.	In section 1(5)(b), the words "or an associated state".
1981 c. 61	British Nationality Act 1981	British Nationality Act 1981.	Section 53(6).
1981 c. 61	British Nationality Act 1981	British Nationality Act 1981.	In section 53(7), the words "and (6)".
1982 c. 16	Civil Aviation Act 1982	Civil Aviation Act 1982.	In section 64(2) and (6)(b), the words "or an associated state".
1982 c. 16	Civil Aviation Act 1982	Civil Aviation Act 1982.	In section 65(3)(b), the words "or an associated state".
1982 c. 16	Civil Aviation Act 1982	Civil Aviation Act 1982.	In section 69A(7)(c), the words "or of an associated state".
1982 c. 16	Civil Aviation Act 1982	Civil Aviation Act 1982.	In section 70, the words "or (b) between the United Kingdom and any associated state," and "or state".
1982 c. 16	Civil Aviation Act 1982	Civil Aviation Act 1982.	In section 84(2)(a) and (4), the words "or an associated state".
1983 c. 6	British Nationality (Falkland Islands) Act 1983	British Nationality (Falkland Islands) Act 1983.	Section 5(5) from "and it is hereby declared" onwards.
Group 2 — Other Repeals
11 Will. 3. c. 12 (Note: This is the citation in The Statutes of the Realm.)	Governors of Plantations Act 1698	An Act to Punish Governors of Plantations in this Kingdom for Crimes by them committed in the Plantations.	The whole act.
42 Geo. 3. c. 85	Criminal Jurisdiction Act 1802	Criminal Jurisdiction Act 1802.	In section 1, the words "the said recited Act passed in the reign of King William aforesaid, or" and ", or either of them,".
33 & 34 Vict. c. 90	Foreign Enlistment Act 1870	Foreign Enlistment Act 1870.	Section 33.
48 & 49 Vict. c. 49	Submarine Telegraph Act 1885	Submarine Telegraph Act 1885.	In section 6(5), the words "or in a supreme court in India".
1 Edw. 8 & 1 Geo. 6. c. 16	Regency Act 1937	Regency Act 1937.	In section 2(2), the words "and to the Government of India".
2 & 3 Geo. 6. c. 65	Prize Act 1939	Prize Act 1939.	Section 4(1)(c).
5 & 6 Geo. 6. c. 17	Anglo-Venezuelan Treaty (Island of Patos) Act 1942	Anglo-Venezuelan Treaty (Island of Patos) Act 1942.	The whole act.
7 & 8 Geo. 6. c. 7	Prize Salvage Act 1944	Prize Salvage Act 1944.	Section 2(1)(b).
9 & 10 Geo. 6. c. 45	United Nations Act 1946	United Nations Act 1946.	In section 1(2), the words "British India" and "and territories in India."
1967 c. 58	Criminal Law Act 1967	Criminal Law Act 1967.	In Schedule 2, paragraph 15(1) from the beginning to "and".
1967 c. 71	Aden, Perim and Kuria Muria Islands Act 1967	Aden, Perim and Kuria Muria Islands Act 1967.	The whole act.

==== Part III: Scottish Local Acts ====
Citation	Short title	Extent of repeal
Group 1 — Glasgow Police Acts
29 & 30 Vict. c. cclxxiii	Glasgow Police Act 1866	The whole act.
36 & 37 Vict. c. xxxviii	Glasgow Police Act 1873	The whole act.
38 & 39 Vict. c. liii	Glasgow Police Act 1875	The whole act.
40 & 41 Vict. c. cxxviii	General Police and Improvement (Scotland) Act 1862 Order Confirmation (Glasgow) Act 1877	The whole act.
40 & 41 Vict. c. clxvii	Glasgow Police Act 1877	The whole act.
42 & 43 Vict. c. cxxiii	Glasgow Municipal Act 1879	The whole act.
45 & 46 Vict. c. xix	Glasgow Corporation and Police Act 1882	The whole act.
48 & 49 Vict. c. xv	Glasgow Police Act 1885	The whole act.
53 & 54 Vict. c. ccxxi	Glasgow Police (Amendment) Act 1890	The whole act.
54 & 55 Vict. c. xxxvii	Glasgow Police (Sewage &c.) Act 1891	The whole act.
55 & 56 Vict. c. clxv	Glasgow Police (Further Powers) Act 1892	The whole act.
58 & 59 Vict. c. cxliii	Glasgow Corporation and Police Act 1895	The whole act.
1 Edw. 7. c. clxiii	Glasgow Corporation (Police) Order Confirmation Act 1901	The whole act.
3 Edw. 7. c. clii	Glasgow Corporation (Police) Order Confirmation Act 1903	The whole act.
4 Edw. 7. c. clxxi	Glasgow Corporation (Police) Order Confirmation Act 1904	The whole act.
5 Edw. 7. c. cxxvii	Glasgow Corporation Order Confirmation Act 1905	In the Schedule—(a) Article 73 of the Order; (b) Article 74 of the Order; (c) Article 79 of the Order, so far as relating to (i) the Glasgow Police Act 1866, (ii) the Glasgow Corporation and Police Act 1882, (iii) the Glasgow Police Act 1885, (iv) the Glasgow Police (Amendment) Act 1890 and (v) the Glasgow Police (Sewage &c.) Act 1891.
7 Edw. 7. c. cxlvi	Glasgow Corporation Act 1907	Sections 43 and 70(3).
2 & 3 Geo. 5. c. cxlix	Glasgow Corporation Order Confirmation Act 1912	In the Schedule, Article 22 of the Order.
4 & 5 Geo. 5. c. clxxviii	Glasgow Corporation Order Confirmation Act 1914	In the Schedule, Articles 4(1) and (2), 11 and 17 of the Order.
9 & 10 Geo. 5. c. xcvi	Glasgow Corporation Order Confirmation Act 1919	In the Schedule, Articles 10, 12 and, so far as relating to Article 28 of the Glasgow Corporation and Police Act 1895, Article 35 of the Order.
11 & 12 Geo. 5. c. xv	Glasgow Corporation Order Confirmation Act 1921	In the Schedule, Articles 10(3) and 23 of the Order.
15 & 16 Geo. 5. c. cxxxi	Glasgow Boundaries Act 1925	In section 31, from the beginning to the words "Act of 1866 and", the word "respectively" and the words "said section 43 and the".
17 & 18 Geo. 5. c. lix	Glasgow Corporation Order Confirmation Act 1927	In the Schedule, Articles 76 and 77 of the Order.
20 & 21 Geo. 5. c. xxxvii	Glasgow Corporation Act 1929	Sections 20, 22(2) and (4), 30 and 31.
20 & 21 Geo. 5. c. clxxvii	Glasgow Corporation Act 1930	Section 39.
24 & 25 Geo. 5. c. lxix	Glasgow Corporation Order Confirmation Act 1934	In the Schedule, Article 47 of the Order.
12 & 13 Geo. 6. c. xix	Glasgow Corporation Order Confirmation Act 1949	In the Schedule, Article 6 of the Order.
2 Eliz. 2. c. i	Glasgow Corporation (Water &c.) Order Confirmation Act 1953	In the Schedule, Article 12 of the Order.
SI 1956/1996	Police (Local Enactments) (Scotland) Order 1956	In the Schedule, all entries in cols. 1, 2 and 3 relating to the Glasgow Police Act 1866.
5 & 6 Eliz. 2. c. xiv	Glasgow Corporation Order Confirmation Act 1957	In the Schedule, Article 9 of the Order.
9 & 10 Eliz. 2. c. xxxix	Glasgow Corporation Order Confirmation Act 1961	In the Schedule, Article 9 of the Order.
1964 c. xliii	Glasgow Corporation Consolidation (Water, Transport and Markets) Order Confirmation Act 1964	In the Schedule, Article 73 of the Order.
1965 c. ii	Glasgow Corporation Order Confirmation Act 1965	In the Schedule, Article 8 of the Order.
1970 c. i	Glasgow Corporation Order Confirmation Act 1970	In the Schedule, Article 16 of the Order.
Group 2 — Dog Warden Acts
1976 c. xxxii	East Kilbride District Council Order Confirmation Act 1976	The whole act.
1977 c. xxii	City of Glasgow District Council Order Confirmation Act 1977	The whole act.
1978 c. xix	Monklands District Council Order Confirmation Act 1978	The whole act.
1979 c. xvii	Stirling District Council Order Confirmation Act 1979	The whole act.
1979 c. xx	Kilmarnock and Loudoun District Council Order Confirmation Act 1979	The whole act.
1980 c. iv	Inverness District Council Order Confirmation Act 1980	The whole act.
1980 c. v	Kirkcaldy District Council Order Confirmation Act 1980	The whole act.
1980 c. vi	Lochaber District Council Order Confirmation Act 1980	The whole act.
1980 c. vii	Strathkelvin District Council Order Confirmation Act 1980	The whole act.
1980 c. viii	West Lothian District Council Order Confirmation Act 1980	The whole act.
1981 c. iii	Cumnock and Doon Valley District Council Order Confirmation Act 1981	The whole act.
1981 c. iv	Dunfermline District Council Order Confirmation Act 1981	The whole act.
1981 c. xxxiii	Midlothian District Council Order Confirmation Act 1981	The whole act.
Group 3 — Other Repeals
20 & 21 Geo. 5. c. xix	Lanarkshire, Renfrewshire and Dunbartonshire Education Authorities Order Confirmation Act 1929	The whole act.
15 & 16 Geo. 6 & 1 Eliz. 2. c. xvii	Kilmarnock Corporation Order Confirmation Act 1952	The whole act.
15 & 16 Geo. 6 & 1 Eliz. 2. c. lii	Hamilton Burgh Order Confirmation Act 1952	The whole act.
1970 c. xxxv	Fife County Council Order Confirmation Act 1970	The whole act.
1970 c. lviii	Stirling County Council Order Confirmation Act 1970	The whole act.
1971 c. xxvii	Dunbarton County Council Order Confirmation Act 1971	The whole act.
1974 c. ii	Ayr County Council Order Confirmation Act 1974	The whole act.
1974 c. xv	Fife County Council Order Confirmation Act 1974	The whole act.
SI 1978/584	Fife County Council Order Confirmation Act 1974 (Application of Provisions) (No.1) Order 1978	The whole order.
SI 1978/585	Fife County Council Order Confirmation Act 1974 (Application of Provisions) (No.2) Order 1978	The whole order.

==== Part IV: Statutory Citation ====
Citation	Short title	Extent of repeal
59 & 60 Vict. c. 14	Short Titles Act 1896	Section 1.
59 & 60 Vict. c. 14	Short Titles Act 1896	Schedule 1.
59 & 60 Vict. c. 14	Short Titles Act 1896	In Schedule 2, the entries relating to the following groups of Acts:— Bank Notes Acts 1826 to 1852; Bankruptcy Acts 1883 to 1890; Bankruptcy (Scotland) Acts 1856 to 1881; Baths and Washhouses Acts 1846 to 1882; Births, Deaths, and Marriages (Scotland) Acts 1854 to 1860; Births and Deaths Registration (Ireland) Acts 1863 to 1880; Bridges Acts 1740 to 1815; Bridges (Ireland) Acts 1813 to 1875; British Subjects Acts 1708 to 1772; Building Societies Acts 1874 to 1894; Burial Grounds (Scotland) Acts 1855 to 1886; Charitable Trusts Acts 1853 to 1894; Companies Acts 1862 to 1893; Congested Districts Board (Ireland) Acts; Copyright Acts 1734 to 1888; Coroners (Ireland) Acts 1829 to 1881; County Courts (Ireland) Acts 1851 to 1889; County Infirmaries (Ireland) Acts 1805 to 1833; Drainage and Improvement of Lands (Ireland) Acts 1863 to 1892; Drainage and Navigation (Ireland) Acts 1842 to 1857; Durham County Palatine Acts 1836 to 1889; East India Company (Money) Acts 1786 to 1858; East India Loans Acts 1859 to 1893; Education (Scotland) Acts 1872 to 1893; Elementary Education Acts 1870 to 1893; Endowed Schools Acts 1869 to 1889; Fisheries (Ireland) Acts 1842 to 1895; Government Annuities Acts 1829 to 1888; Herring Fisheries (Scotland) Acts 1821 to 1890; Highway Acts 1835 to 1885; International Copyright Acts; Judicature (Ireland) Acts 1877 to 1888; Juries Acts 1825 to 1870; Justiciary Court (Scotland) Acts 1783 to 1892; Labourers (Ireland) Acts 1883 to 1892; Lancaster County Palatine Acts 1794 to 1871; Licensing (Ireland) Acts 1833 to 1886; Life Assurance Companies Acts 1870 to 1872; Lunacy (Scotland) Acts 1857 to 1887; Lunacy (Ireland) Acts 1821 to 1890; Matrimonial Causes Acts 1857 to 1878; Medical Acts; Merchandise Marks Acts 1887 to 1894; Metropolis Management Acts 1855 to 1893; Municipal Corporations (Ireland) Acts 1840 to 1888; Naval Enlistment Acts 1835 to 1884; Patents, Designs, and Trade Marks Acts 1883 to 1888; Petroleum Acts 1871 to 1881; Police Acts 1839 to 1893; Police (Scotland) Acts 1857 to 1890; Post Office Acts 1837 to 1895; Post Office (Duties) Acts 1840 to 1891; Post Office (Management) Acts 1837 to 1884; Post Office (Money Orders) Acts 1848 to 1883; Post Office (Offences) Acts 1837 and 1884; Post Office Savings Bank Acts 1861 to 1893; Prison Acts 1865 to 1893; Prisons (Scotland) Acts 1860 to 1887; Prisons (Ireland) Acts 1826 to 1884; Public Libraries Acts 1892 and 1893; Public Libraries (Ireland) Acts 1855 to 1894; Public Libraries (Scotland) Acts 1887 and 1894; Public Money Drainage Acts 1846 to 1856; Salmon Fisheries (Scotland) Acts 1828 to 1868; Salmon and Freshwater Fisheries Acts 1861 to 1892; Small Debt (Scotland) Acts 1837 to 1889; Solicitors Acts 1839 to 1894; Solicitors (Ireland) Acts 1849 to 1881; Superannuation Acts 1834 to 1892; Trustee Savings Banks Acts 1863 to 1893; Trusts (Scotland) Acts 1861 to 1891; Universities and College Estates Acts 1858 to 1880; Weights and Measures Acts 1878 to 1893; Yeomanry Acts 1802 to 1826.
11 & 12 Geo. 6. c. 62	Statute Law Revision Act 1948	Section 5.
11 & 12 Geo. 6. c. 62	Statute Law Revision Act 1948	Schedule 2.
1951 c. 1 (N.I.)	Short Titles Act (Northern Ireland) 1951	Section 1.
1951 c. 1 (N.I.)	Short Titles Act (Northern Ireland) 1951	The Schedule.
1964 c. 80	Statute Law Revision (Scotland) Act 1964	The whole act.
1977 c. 18	Statute Law (Repeals) Act 1977	Section 3.
1977 c. 18	Statute Law (Repeals) Act 1977	Schedule 3.
1978 c. 45	Statute Law (Repeals) Act 1978	Section 2.
1978 c. 45	Statute Law (Repeals) Act 1978	Schedule 3.

==== Part V: Transport ====
Citation	Short title	Extent of repeal
Group 1 — Pilotage Orders Confirmation Acts
54 & 55 Vict. c. xlvii	Pilotage Orders Confirmation (No.2) Act 1891	The whole act.
56 & 57 Vict. c. xxxvi	Pilotage Orders Confirmation Act 1893	The whole act.
60 & 61 Vict. c. clvii	Pilotage Order Confirmation Act 1897	The whole act.
2 Edw. 7. c. lxxvi	Pilotage Order Confirmation Act 1902	The whole act.
3 & 4 Geo. 5. c. clxv	Pilotage Order (London) Confirmation Act 1913	The whole act.
10 & 11 Geo. 5. c. ciii	Pilotage Orders Confirmation (No.1) Act 1920	The whole act.
10 & 11 Geo. 5. c. civ	Pilotage Orders Confirmation (No.2) Act 1920	The whole act.
10 & 11 Geo. 5. c. cxxiv	Pilotage Orders Confirmation (No.3) Act 1920	The whole act.
11 & 12 Geo. 5. c. vi	Pilotage Orders Confirmation (No.1) Act 1921	The whole act.
11 & 12 Geo. 5. c. xvi	Pilotage Orders Confirmation (No.2) Act 1921	The whole act.
11 & 12 Geo. 5. c. lv	Pilotage Orders Confirmation (No.3) Act 1921	The whole act.
11 & 12 Geo. 5. c. lvi	Pilotage Orders Confirmation (No.4) Act 1921	The whole act.
11 & 12 Geo. 5. c. lxxi	Pilotage Orders Confirmation (No.6) Act 1921	The whole act.
11 & 12 Geo. 5. c. lxxii	Pilotage Orders Confirmation (No.7) Act 1921	The whole act.
11 & 12 Geo. 5. c. cxii	Pilotage Orders Confirmation (No.5) Act 1921	The whole act.
12 & 13 Geo. 5. c. xiii	Pilotage Orders Confirmation (No.2) Act 1922	The whole act.
12 & 13 Geo. 5. c. xxxvii	Pilotage Orders Confirmation (No.1) Act 1922	The whole act.
12 & 13 Geo. 5. c. xxxviii	Pilotage Orders Confirmation (No.3) Act 1922	The whole act.
1976 c. xxi	Stornoway Harbour Order Confirmation Act 1976	In the Schedule, Part VII of the Order.
Group 2 — Other Repeals
1975 c. 36	Air Travel Reserve Fund Act 1975	The whole act.
1978 c. 8	Civil Aviation Act 1978	The whole act.
1980 c. 66	Highways Act 1980	In section 18(8), the word "rural".
1982 c. 16	Civil Aviation Act 1982	In section 48(7)(a), the words from "and" to "a council".
1982 c. 16	Civil Aviation Act 1982	Section 60(3)(k).
1982 c. 16	Civil Aviation Act 1982	In Schedule 14, paragraph 11.
1982 c. 16	Civil Aviation Act 1982	In Schedule 15, paragraph 20.
1985 c. 67	Transport Act 1985	In section 35(4)(a), the words from ", not being a licence" to "suspension".
1985 c. 67	Transport Act 1985	Section 39(4) from "(not being" onwards.
1985 c. 67	Transport Act 1985	Section 89(6)(a)(i).

==== Part VI: Miscellaneous ====
Citation	Short title	Description	Extent of repeal
Group 1 — General Repeals
48 Geo. 3. c. 128	Regimental Accounts Act 1808	Regimental Accounts Act 1808.	The whole act.
57 Geo. 3. c. 93	Distress (Costs) Act 1817	Distress (Costs) Act 1817.	The whole act.
60 Geo. 3 & 1 Geo. 4. c. 1	Unlawful Drilling Act 1819	Unlawful Drilling Act 1819.	In section 1, the words from "or to be punished" to "shall be had" where they first appear.
7 & 8 Geo. 4. c. 17	Distress (Costs) Act 1827	Distress (Costs) Act 1827.	The whole act.
2 & 3 Vict. c. 47	Metropolitan Police Act 1839	Metropolitan Police Act 1839.	Sections 35 to 37.
8 & 9 Vict. c. 113	Evidence Act 1845	Evidence Act 1845.	Section 4.
37 & 38 Vict. c. 81	Great Seal (Offices) Act 1874	Great Seal (Offices) Act 1874.	Section 4 from "There shall be paid" to the end.
37 & 38 Vict. c. 81	Great Seal (Offices) Act 1874	Great Seal (Offices) Act 1874.	Section 7.
37 & 38 Vict. c. 81	Great Seal (Offices) Act 1874	Great Seal (Offices) Act 1874.	In section 9, the proviso.
38 & 39 Vict. c. 16	Regimental Exchange Act 1875	Regimental Exchange Act 1875.	The whole act.
48 & 49 Vict. c. 72	Housing of the Working Classes Act 1885	Housing of the Working Classes Act 1885.	The whole Act as it applies in England and Wales.
54 & 55 Vict. c. 40	Brine Pumping (Compensation for Subsidence) Act 1891	Brine Pumping (Compensation for Subsidence) Act 1891.	The whole act.
10 & 11 Geo. 5. c. 43	Firearms Act 1920	Firearms Act 1920.	The whole act.
11 & 12 Geo. 5. c. 7	Tribunals of Inquiry (Evidence) Act 1921	Tribunals of Inquiry (Evidence) Act 1921.	In section 1(1), the words "(whether before or after the commencement of this Act)".
15 & 16 Geo. 5. c. 58	Greenwich Hospital (Disused Burial Ground) Act 1925	Greenwich Hospital (Disused Burial Ground) Act 1925.	The whole act.
26 Geo. 5 & 1 Edw. 8. c. 49	Public Health Act 1936	Public Health Act 1936.	Section 309(4).
26 Geo. 5 & 1 Edw. 8. c. 49	Public Health Act 1936	Public Health Act 1936.	Section 315.
26 Geo. 5 & 1 Edw. 8. c. 49	Public Health Act 1936	Public Health Act 1936.	In section 326(6), the words "isolation hospital committee".
2 & 3 Geo. 6. c. 72	Landlord and Tenant (War Damage) Act 1939	Landlord and Tenant (War Damage) Act 1939.	In section 6(1), the words "or a notice of retention".
2 & 3 Geo. 6. c. 72	Landlord and Tenant (War Damage) Act 1939	Landlord and Tenant (War Damage) Act 1939.	In section 6(4), the words "in respect of a notice of disclaimer or a notice to elect".
2 & 3 Geo. 6. c. 72	Landlord and Tenant (War Damage) Act 1939	Landlord and Tenant (War Damage) Act 1939.	In section 6(5), the words "a notice of retention".
2 & 3 Geo. 6. c. 72	Landlord and Tenant (War Damage) Act 1939	Landlord and Tenant (War Damage) Act 1939.	In section 15, the words ", a notice of retention", "or retention", and ", notice of retention", wherever occurring.
2 & 3 Geo. 6. c. 89	Trading with the Enemy Act 1939	Trading with the Enemy Act 1939.	Section 17(2) and (3).
2 & 3 Geo. 6. c. 107	Patents, Designs, Copyright and Trade Marks (Emergency) Act 1939	Patents, Designs, Copyright and Trade Marks (Emergency) Act 1939.	In section 1(2), the words from "or has at any time" to "been,".
2 & 3 Geo. 6. c. 107	Patents, Designs, Copyright and Trade Marks (Emergency) Act 1939	Patents, Designs, Copyright and Trade Marks (Emergency) Act 1939.	In section 2(1)(a), the words from "or has at any time" to "been,".
4 & 5 Geo. 6. c. 41	Landlord and Tenant (War Damage) (Amendment) Act 1941	Landlord and Tenant (War Damage) (Amendment) Act 1941.	Section 1(9).
4 & 5 Geo. 6. c. 41	Landlord and Tenant (War Damage) (Amendment) Act 1941	Landlord and Tenant (War Damage) (Amendment) Act 1941.	Section 2(1) to (4).
4 & 5 Geo. 6. c. 41	Landlord and Tenant (War Damage) (Amendment) Act 1941	Landlord and Tenant (War Damage) (Amendment) Act 1941.	In section 2(5), from the beginning to "Act, and" and the word "said".
4 & 5 Geo. 6. c. 41	Landlord and Tenant (War Damage) (Amendment) Act 1941	Landlord and Tenant (War Damage) (Amendment) Act 1941.	Section 2(6) to (8).
4 & 5 Geo. 6. c. 41	Landlord and Tenant (War Damage) (Amendment) Act 1941	Landlord and Tenant (War Damage) (Amendment) Act 1941.	Sections 3 to 9.
4 & 5 Geo. 6. c. 41	Landlord and Tenant (War Damage) (Amendment) Act 1941	Landlord and Tenant (War Damage) (Amendment) Act 1941.	In section 10(1), from ", and" to the end.
4 & 5 Geo. 6. c. 41	Landlord and Tenant (War Damage) (Amendment) Act 1941	Landlord and Tenant (War Damage) (Amendment) Act 1941.	Section 10(2) and (3).
4 & 5 Geo. 6. c. 41	Landlord and Tenant (War Damage) (Amendment) Act 1941	Landlord and Tenant (War Damage) (Amendment) Act 1941.	In section 11, from ", and any proceedings" to the end.
4 & 5 Geo. 6. c. 41	Landlord and Tenant (War Damage) (Amendment) Act 1941	Landlord and Tenant (War Damage) (Amendment) Act 1941.	Section 16.
4 & 5 Geo. 6. c. 41	Landlord and Tenant (War Damage) (Amendment) Act 1941	Landlord and Tenant (War Damage) (Amendment) Act 1941.	Section 17(5).
4 & 5 Geo. 6. c. 41	Landlord and Tenant (War Damage) (Amendment) Act 1941	Landlord and Tenant (War Damage) (Amendment) Act 1941.	The Schedule, so far as it relates to modifications of section 6 of the Landlord and Tenant (War Damage) Act 1939.
5 & 6 Geo. 6. c. 9 (N.I.)	Landlord and Tenant (War Damage) Act (Northern Ireland) 1941	Landlord and Tenant (War Damage) Act (Northern Ireland) 1941.	In section 6(1), the words "or a notice of retention".
5 & 6 Geo. 6. c. 9 (N.I.)	Landlord and Tenant (War Damage) Act (Northern Ireland) 1941	Landlord and Tenant (War Damage) Act (Northern Ireland) 1941.	In section 6(4), the words "in respect of a notice of disclaimer or a notice to elect".
5 & 6 Geo. 6. c. 9 (N.I.)	Landlord and Tenant (War Damage) Act (Northern Ireland) 1941	Landlord and Tenant (War Damage) Act (Northern Ireland) 1941.	In section 6(5), the words "a notice of retention or".
5 & 6 Geo. 6. c. 9 (N.I.)	Landlord and Tenant (War Damage) Act (Northern Ireland) 1941	Landlord and Tenant (War Damage) Act (Northern Ireland) 1941.	In section 14, the words ", a notice of retention", "or retention" and ", notice of retention", wherever occurring.
5 & 6 Geo. 6. c. 9 (N.I.)	Landlord and Tenant (War Damage) Act (Northern Ireland) 1941	Landlord and Tenant (War Damage) Act (Northern Ireland) 1941.	Part III.
5 & 6 Geo. 6. c. 9 (N.I.)	Landlord and Tenant (War Damage) Act (Northern Ireland) 1941	Landlord and Tenant (War Damage) Act (Northern Ireland) 1941.	Section 36.
5 & 6 Geo. 6. c. 9 (N.I.)	Landlord and Tenant (War Damage) Act (Northern Ireland) 1941	Landlord and Tenant (War Damage) Act (Northern Ireland) 1941.	Section 38(3).
1965 c. 18	War Damage Act 1965	War Damage Act 1965.	Section 1(2).
1966 c. 39	Land Registration Act 1966	Land Registration Act 1966.	The whole act.
1968 c. 28 (N.I.)	Criminal Justice (Miscellaneous Provisions) Act (Northern Ireland) 1968	Criminal Justice (Miscellaneous Provisions) Act (Northern Ireland) 1968.	In Schedule 2, the entry relating to the Evidence Act 1845.
1969 c. 48	Post Office Act 1969	Post Office Act 1969.	In Schedule 9, paragraph 17(2)(a) and (5)(c).
1971 c. 54	Land Registration and Land Charges Act 1971	Land Registration and Land Charges Act 1971.	Section 2(6).
1972 c. 70	Local Government Act 1972	Local Government Act 1972.	In section 243(4), the words "of election or".
1980 c. 25	Insurance Companies Act 1980	Insurance Companies Act 1980.	In Schedule 3, paragraphs 16 and 19.
1982 c. 50	Insurance Companies Act 1982	Insurance Companies Act 1982.	In Schedule 5, paragraph 22(b) and (e).
1989 c. 24	Social Security Act 1989	Social Security Act 1989.	In Schedule 7, paragraph 27.
1989 c. 24	Social Security Act 1989	Social Security Act 1989.	In Schedule 8, paragraph 12(3) and (4).
SI 1989/438	Community Charges (Administration and Enforcement) Regulations 1989	Community Charges (Administration and Enforcement) Regulations 1989.	Regulation 39(9).
SI 1989/1058	Non-Domestic Rating (Collection and Enforcement) (Local Lists) Regulations 1989	Non-Domestic Rating (Collection and Enforcement) (Local Lists) Regulations 1989.	Regulation 14(9).
1990 c. 8	Town and Country Planning Act 1990	Town and Country Planning Act 1990.	In section 252(12), the word "rural".
1990 c. 8	Town and Country Planning Act 1990	Town and Country Planning Act 1990.	In Schedule 14, in paragraph 1(2)(b)(ii), the word "rural" wherever it appears.
SI 1992/613	Council Tax (Administration and Enforcement) Regulations 1992	Council Tax (Administration and Enforcement) Regulations 1992.	Regulation 45(9).
Group 2 — Bank of England
3 Geo. 1. c. 8	Bank of England Act 1716	Bank of England Act 1716.	The whole act.
4 Geo. 3. c. 49	Bank of England Buildings Act 1764	An Act to enable the Governor and Company of the Bank of England to purchase Houses and Ground for opening a Passage for Carriages, from Cornhill to the Bank, and making more commodious several other Passages leading thereto; and for enlarging the Buildings of the said Bank, and making the same more commodious.	The whole act.
5 Geo. 3. c. 91	City of London (Improvement) Act 1765	An Act for vesting certain Glebe Lands belong to the Rectory of the Parish Church of Saint Christopher, in the City of London, in the Governor and Company of the Bank of England; and for making a Recompence to the Rector of the said Parish, and his Successors, in lieu thereof; and for obviating certain Doubts in an Act passed in the Thirty third Year of the Reign of His late Majesty, for widening certain Streets, Lanes, and Passages, within the City of London.	The whole Act except so far as it purports to obviate certain doubts in the Act of 33 Geo.2 c.30 (1759) for widening certain streets, lanes and passages within the City of London.
6 Geo. 3. c. 76	Bank of England (Buildings) Act 1766	An Act to enable the Governor and Company of the Bank of England to purchase certain Houses and Ground contiguous and near to the Bank; and for making certain Avenues leading thereto more commodious.	The whole act.
21 Geo. 3. c. 71	Saint Christopher-le-Stocks Church, London Act 1781	An Act for vesting the Parish Church of Saint Christopher le Stocks, in the City of London, and the Materials and Site thereof and the Church-yard thereto adjoining, in the Governor and Company of the Bank of England, and their Successors for ever; and for uniting the said Parish to the Parish of Saint Margaret Lothbury, in the said City.	The whole act.
33 Geo. 3. c. 15	Bank of England Site Act 1793	An Act to enable the Governor and Company of the Bank of England to purchase certain Houses and Ground contiguous to the Bank of England.	The whole act.
39 & 40 Geo. 3. c. lxxxix	Bank of England Act 1800	An Act to empower the Governor and Company of the Bank of England to purchase certain Houses and Ground contiguous to the Bank of England and to enable them to improve certain Avenues adjacent thereto.	The whole act.

== Subsequent developments ==
Paragraph 1(a) and the words "Great Britain and" in paragraph(1) of schedule 2 to the act were repealed by section 1(1) of, and part 3 of schedule 1 to, the Statute Law (Repeals) Act 2008, which came into force on 21 July 2008.

== See also ==
- Statute Law (Repeals) Act
