= Purchase Tax Act 1963 =

Act of the Parliament of the United Kingdom

Purchase Tax Act 1963 (Note: Section 42(1).)
- Act of Parliament
- Parliament of the United Kingdom
- Long title: An Act to consolidate the enactments relating to purchase tax.
- Citation: 1963 c. 9
- Territorial extent: United Kingdom

Dates
- Royal assent: 28 March 1963
- Commencement: 1 April 1963 (Note: Section 42(2).)
- Repealed: 1 April 1973 (Note: Finance Act 1972, section 54(8) and part I of schedule 28.)
Other legislation
Amends	See § Repealed enactments
Repeals/revokes	See § Repealed enactments
Amended by	Finance Act 1969; Statute Law (Repeals) Act 1974
Repealed by	Finance Act 1972

Status: Repealed

Text of statute as originally enacted

The Purchase Tax Act 1963 (c. 9) was an act of the Parliament of the United Kingdom that consolidated enactments relating to purchase tax in the United Kingdom.

== Provisions ==
=== Repealed enactments ===
Section 41(1) of the act repealed 21 enactments, listed in part I of schedule 4 to the act.

Part I – Enactments repealed
Citation	Short title	Extent of repeal
3 & 4 Geo. 6. c. 48	Finance (No. 2) Act 1940	Part V. Schedules 8 and 9.
4 & 5 Geo. 6. c. 30	Finance Act 1941	Section 48.
5 & 6 Geo. 6. c. 21	Finance Act 1942	Section 20. Section 49(3).
6 & 7 Geo. 6. c. 28	Finance Act 1943	Section 12. Section 31(2)(c).
7 & 8 Geo. 6. c. 23	Finance Act 1944	Part II. Section 49(3). Schedule 2.
9 & 10 Geo. 6. c. 13	Finance (No. 2) Act 1945	Section 2. Section 14(1). Section 62(2)(a).
9 & 10 Geo. 6. c. 64	Finance Act 1946	Part II. Section 67(3). Schedules 4 and 5.
10 & 11 Geo. 6. c. 35	Finance Act 1947	Section 74(3).
11 & 12 Geo. 6. c. 29	National Assistance Act 1948	Section 41(4).
11 & 12 Geo. 6. c. 49	Finance Act 1948	Part II. Section 82(3).
14 Geo. 6. c. 15	Finance Act 1950	Sections 18 and 19. Section 50(2)(c). Schedule 5.
15 & 16 Geo. 6 & 1 Eliz. 2. c. 33	Finance Act 1952	Part II. Section 76(3).
15 & 16 Geo. 6 & 1 Eliz. 2. c. 44	Customs and Excise Act 1952	Section 317. Schedule 9.
1 & 2 Eliz. 2. c. 34	Finance Act 1953	Section 11. Section 33(2). Section 35(3).
2 & 3 Eliz. 2. c. 44	Finance Act 1954	Part II. Section 35(3).
4 & 5 Eliz. 2. c. 54	Finance Act 1956	Section 7. In section 44(2), the words "except so far as it relates to purchase tax", and the words from "and so far as" to the end of the subsection.
5 & 6 Eliz. 2. c. 49	Finance Act 1957	Section 42(2)(4).
6 & 7 Eliz. 2. c. 56	Finance Act 1958	Part I. Section 40(2)(a). Schedule 2.
7 & 8 Eliz. 2. c. 58	Finance Act 1959	Part II. Section 37(2)(b).
8 & 9 Eliz. 2. c. 44	Finance Act 1960	Sections 75 and 76. Section 79(3)(e).
10 & 11 Eliz. 2. c. 44	Finance Act 1962	Section 6. In section 34(2), the words "or, so far as it relates to purchase tax, with Part V of the Finance (No. 2) Act 1940". Schedule 8.

Section 41(1) of the act revoked 14 instruments, listed in part II of schedule 4 to the act.

Part II – Orders revoked
Citation	Title	Extent of revocation
SR&O 1941/1389	Purchase Tax (Reduction of Registration Limit) Order 1941	The whole order.
SI 1951/60	Purchase Tax (No. 1) Order 1951	The whole order.
SI 1956/383	Purchase Tax (Consolidation) Order 1956	The whole order.
SI 1956/384	Purchase Tax Orders (Revision) Order 1956	The whole order.
SI 1960/2351	Purchase Tax (No. 5) Order 1960	The whole order.
SI 1961/2285	Purchase Tax (No. 2) Order 1961	Article 2.
SI 1961/2499	Purchase Tax (No. 3) Order 1961	The whole order.
SI 1961/2500	Purchase Tax (No. 4) Order 1961	The whole order.
SI 1962/595	Purchase Tax (No. 1) Order 1962	In Article 1, the words from "and" to the end of the Article.
SI 1962/716	Purchase Tax (No. 2) Order 1962	The whole order.
SI 1962/1686	Purchase Tax (No. 4) Order 1962	The whole order.
SI 1962/2007	Purchase Tax (No. 5) Order 1962	The whole order.
SI 1962/2434	Purchase Tax (No. 6) Order 1962	The whole order.
SI 1962/2841	Purchase Tax (No. 7) Order 1962	The whole order.

== Subsequent developments ==
Specific provisions of the act were repealed by section 54(8) of, and part I of schedule 28 to, the Finance Act 1972, which came into force on 1 April 1973. The remainder of the act was subject to a postponed repeal under part II of schedule 28 to the Finance Act 1972, to take effect on a date to be appointed by the Treasury by statutory instrument.

Section 41(1) of, and schedule 4 to, the act were repealed by section 1 of, and part XI of the schedule to, the Statute Law (Repeals) Act 1974, which came into force on 27 June 1974.
