= Mansfield and District Light Railways =

Tramway operator in England

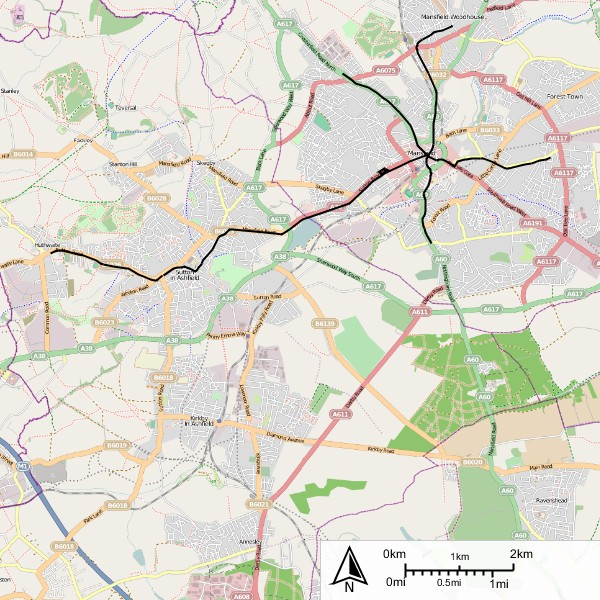
- Map of the routes of Mansfield and District Light Railways

Operation
- Locale: Mansfield
- Open: 16 July 1905
- Close: 9 October 1932
- Status: Closed

Infrastructure
- Track gauge: 1,435 mm (4 ft 8 1/2 in)
- Propulsion system: Electric
- Depots: Sutton Road, Mansfield

Statistics
- Route length: 12.28 miles (19.76 km)

Mansfield and District Light Railways was an electric tramway network operating in Mansfield from 16 July 1905 to 9 October 1932. The tramway company was a subsidiary of Midland Counties Electric Supply Company, who in turn were owned by Balfour Beatty.

== History ==
On 18 November 1904, Mansfield Town Council concluded negotiations with the company promoting the tramway and authorised the start of construction.

The Pleasley and Nottingham Road sections of the Mansfield and District Light Railways were completed and inspected by General Trotter and Major Pringle of the Board of Trade on 11 July 1905 and opened for passenger traffic on the same day.

The service from Mansfield to Sutton was authorised to start on 21 December 1905

== Infrastructure ==
The tramway network consisted of five routes covering just over 12 miles and joining neighbouring towns. These routes began in Mansfield's Market Place and went to Berry Hill, Crown Farm, Mansfield Woodhouse, Pleasley and via Sutton-in-Ashfield to Hucknall-under-Huthwaite.

The depot was in Sutton Road, Mansfield at SK 5306 6080. The buildings and site are still in use as a motorbus depot.

== Tramcars ==
The fleet comprised a total of 31 cars plus a water car. Livery was red and cream (light green and cream in later years). Two cars were purchased in 1912 from the Cavehill and Whitewell Tramway of Northern Ireland and two bought and one borrowed in 1930 from the nearby Nottinghamshire and Derbyshire Tramways Company (another Midland Counties Electric Supply Company subsidiary).

== Closure ==
Mansfield District Traction Act 1929 (Note: Section 1.)
- Act of Parliament
- Parliament of the United Kingdom
- Long title: An Act to authorise the Mansfield and District Light Railway Company to provide and run trolley vehicles and omnibuses to change the name of the Company and for other purposes.
- Citation: 19 & 20 Geo. 5. c. lxxvi
- Territorial extent: United Kingdom

Dates
- Royal assent: 10 May 1929
- Commencement: 10 May 1929
- Repealed: 8 November 1995

Other legislation
- Repealed by: Statute Law (Repeals) Act 1995

Status: Repealed

Text of statute as originally enacted

The tramway was largely rural in nature and it was replaced by motor buses operated by the Mansfield District Traction Company, despite trolleybus authority having been obtained in the Mansfield District Traction Act 1929 (19 & 20 Geo. 5. c. lxxvi).

In 1932 two trams (27 and 28) were sold to Sunderland Corporation Tramways, where they saw further service until 1953.
