= Anguilla Act 1980 =

Act of the Parliament of the United Kingdom

Anguilla Act 1980 (Note: Section 2(1).)
- Act of Parliament
- Parliament of the United Kingdom
- Long title: An Act to make further provision with respect to Anguilla.
- Citation: 1980 c. 67
- Territorial extent: United Kingdom; Associated State of St Kitts, Nevis and Anguilla; (Note: Section 2(2), which was repealed by the Statute Law (Repeals) Act 1995.)

Dates
- Royal assent: 16 December 1980
- Commencement: 19 December 1980 (Note: Section 1(1). The appointed day under the Anguilla (Appointed Day) Order 1980 (SI 1980/1953).)
Other legislation
Repeals/revokes	Anguilla Act 1971
Amended by	Statute Law (Repeals) Act 1995

Status: Amended

Text of statute as originally enacted

Revised text of statute as amended

Text of the Anguilla Act 1980 as in force today (including any amendments) within the United Kingdom, from legislation.gov.uk.

The Anguilla Act 1980 (c. 67) is an act of the Parliament of the United Kingdom, which received royal assent on 16 December 1980. The act made provision for the government of Anguilla by Order in Council, and for the territory to be administered by the United Kingdom.

The act also separated Anguilla from the Associated State of St Kitts, Nevis and Anguilla, which was created in turn by a federal act in 1882.

== Provisions ==
Section 1(1) of the act provided that, on a day appointed by Order in Council, Anguilla would cease to form part of the territory of the associated state of Saint Christopher, Nevis and Anguilla, and that the West Indies Act 1967 would have effect as if the events in section 13(1) of that act (the power to make changes in the law by Order in Council in certain events) included the coming into force of the subsection. Section 1(2) allowed the Queen to make provision by Order in Council for and in connection with the government of Anguilla. Section 1(3) allowed the Queen to make provision by Order in Council for and in connection with Anguilla attaining fully responsible status, being established as an independent republic, or, after fully responsible status had been attained, becoming a republic. Such an order could modify any enactment of the Parliament of the United Kingdom, or any instrument made under one, and no recommendation could be made to the Queen to make an order under section 1(3) unless a draft had been approved by a resolution of each House of Parliament. An order under section 1(2) could be made at any time after the act was passed, but could not come into force before the appointed day.

Section 1(5) of the act repealed the Anguilla Act 1971, which it superseded, from the appointed day. Section 1(6) preserved any Order in Council and any appointment of a Commissioner made under the 1971 act, although they could be revoked by or under an order under section 1(2). Section 2(2) provided that the act had effect, and extended to, the associated state notwithstanding anything in the 1967 act or any Order in Council made under it.

== Subsequent developments ==
The appointed day under section 1(1) was 19 December 1980. The power in section 1(2) was used to make the Anguilla Constitution Order 1982, which came into operation on 1 April 1982.

Section 1(1) and section 2(2) were repealed by section 1(1) of, and part II of schedule 1 to, the Statute Law (Repeals) Act 1995, which came into force on 8 November 1995.
