= Nottingham Corporation Gas Department =

Coal gas producer and supplier in Nottingham, England 1874–1947

The Nottingham Corporation Gas Department was responsible for the production and supply of coal gas in Nottingham, England, from 1874 to 1947.

== Pre-corporation ownership ==
Nottingham Gas Act 1818
- Act of Parliament
- Parliament of the United Kingdom
- Long title: An Act for lighting with Gas the Town and County of the Town of Nottingham.
- Citation: 58 Geo. 3. c. lvii
- Territorial extent: United Kingdom

Dates
- Royal assent: 8 May 1818
- Commencement: 8 May 1818 (Note: The Acts of Parliament (Commencement) Act 1793.)

Other legislation
- Repealed by: Nottingham Gas Act 1842

Status: Repealed

Text of statute as originally enacted

Various Nottingham townsmen collaborated to get a bill passed in Parliament on 8 May 1818 – the Nottingham Gas Act 1818 (58 Geo. 3. c. lvii) to establish the Nottingham Gas Light and Coke Company.

=== Nottingham Gas Light and Coke Company ===
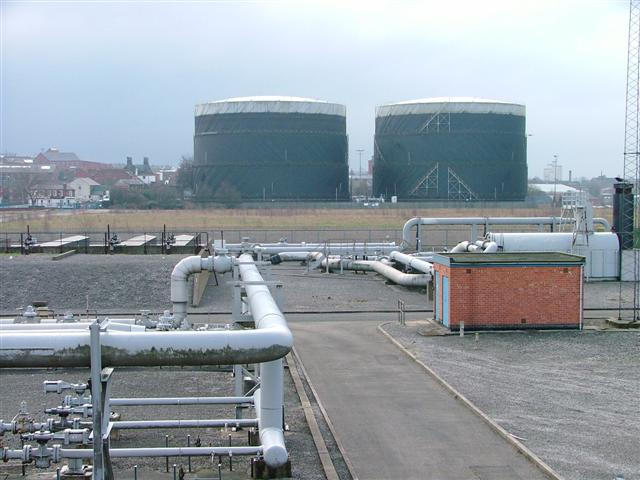
Basford Gas Works.

The first works was erected at Butchers Close beside the Nottingham Canal. The plant was probably designed by Thomas Livesey. On 14 April 1819, streets in the city were lit by gas for the first time. Ten gas lamps only were lit, one at the top of Hollowstone, one at the top of Drury Hill, five in Bridlesmith Gate and three in front of the Exchange. Crowds flocked to witness the miracle of a flame burning without a wick but these crowds were terrified lest the pipes conveying the gas to the burners should explode and blow them up.

Increased demand led to a second holder at Butchers Close in the early 1820s and by 1835 this had increased to five.

Nottingham Gas Act 1842
- Act of Parliament
- Parliament of the United Kingdom
- Long title: An Act for granting more effectual Powers for lighting with Gas the Town of Nottingham, and several Parishes and Places adjacent thereto.
- Citation: 5 & 6 Vict. c. xiii
- Territorial extent: United Kingdom

Dates
- Royal assent: 29 April 1842
- Commencement: 29 April 1842 (Note: Section 1.)
- Repealed: 1 July 1853

Other legislation
- Repeals/revokes: Nottingham Gas Act 1818
- Repealed by: Nottingham Gas Act 1853

Status: Repealed

Text of statute as originally enacted

Nottingham Gas Act 1853 (Note: Section 2.)
- Act of Parliament
- Parliament of the United Kingdom
- Long title: An Act for lighting with Gas the Town of Nottingham, and certain Parishes and Places adjacent thereto.
- Citation: 16 & 17 Vict. c. xi
- Territorial extent: United Kingdom

Dates
- Royal assent: 9 May 1853
- Commencement: 1 July 1853
- Repealed: 8 November 1995

Other legislation
- Repeals/revokes: Nottingham Gas Act 1842
- Repealed by: Statute Law (Repeals) Act 1995

Status: Repealed

Text of statute as originally enacted

The Nottingham Gas Act 1842 (5 & 6 Vict. c. xiii) extended the limits of supply to include Sneinton, Radford, Lenton and Basford. The company expanded over the next 30 years under the capable leadership of managing engineer Thomas Hawksley. There were new works built at Radford (1844) and Basford (c. 1854).

On 7 November 1853 a specially convened meeting of the town council appointed a committee to look into taking over the supply of gas. The committee reported to back on 3 January 1854. It was of the opinion that under existing circumstances no adequate advantage would be gained by the Council taking upon itself the risk of the Gas supply.

By 1861, gas was being delivered from Nottingham as far as Beeston.

Nottingham Gas Act 1864
- Act of Parliament
- Parliament of the United Kingdom
- Long title: An Act to grant further Powers to the Nottingham Gaslight and Coke Company.
- Citation: 27 & 28 Vict. c. cix
- Territorial extent: United Kingdom

Dates
- Royal assent: 23 June 1864
- Commencement: 23 June 1864
- Repealed: 8 November 1995

Other legislation
- Repealed by: Statute Law (Repeals) Act 1995

Status: Repealed

Text of statute as originally enacted

Nottingham Gas Act 1873
- Act of Parliament
- Parliament of the United Kingdom
- Long title: An Act for granting further powers to the Nottingham Gaslight and Coke Company.
- Citation: 36 & 37 Vict. c. ccv
- Territorial extent: United Kingdom

Dates
- Royal assent: 28 July 1873
- Commencement: 28 July 1873
- Repealed: 8 November 1995

Other legislation
- Repealed by: Statute Law (Repeals) Act 1995

Status: Repealed

Text of statute as originally enacted

The Nottingham Gas Act 1864 (27 & 28 Vict. c. cix) further extended the limits of supply and allowed for the purchase of Samuel John Barber's works at Eastcroft, Nottingham. More capital was raised through the Nottingham Gas Act 1873 (36 & 37 Vict. c. ccv).

Nottingham Corporation (Gas) Act 1874
- Act of Parliament
- Parliament of the United Kingdom
- Long title: An Act for transferring to the Mayor, Aldermen, and Burgesses of the Borough of Nottingham the Undertaking of the Nottingham Gaslight and Coke Company.
- Citation: 37 & 38 Vict. c. cxxxvi
- Territorial extent: United Kingdom

Dates
- Royal assent: 16 July 1874
- Commencement: 16 July 1874
- Repealed: 8 November 1995

Other legislation
- Repealed by: Statute Law (Repeals) Act 1995

Status: Repealed

Text of statute as originally enacted

The Nottingham Corporation (Gas) Act 1874 (37 & 38 Vict. c. cxxxvi) transferred the company to local authority control at a meeting on 1 May 1874 when a meeting of shareholders at the George Hotel approved the transfer of ownership. The accepted offer was a payment of £75 for each £50 share.

The Nottingham Corporation Gas Office was based on George Street, adjoining the George Hotel.

By 1914, seven million cubic feet of gas was made daily from 700 tons of coal

There was an unstable period due to mismanagement during the early years of the twentieth century, but sales revived in the 1930s. By 1936 Radford had become a reserve station.

On nationalisation in 1949 they became part of the Nottingham sub-division of the Nottingham and Derby division of the East Midlands Gas Board, and then the British Gas Corporation in 1972.
