= Prize Act 1939 =

Act of the Parliament of the United Kingdom

Prize Act 1939 (Note: Section 5.)
- Act of Parliament
- Parliament of the United Kingdom
- Long title: An Act to apply prize law to aircraft; to amend and explain the enactments relating to prize; and to provide for purposes connected with the matters aforesaid.
- Citation: 2 & 3 Geo. 6. c. 65
- Introduced by: Sir Donald Somervell (Commons)
- Territorial extent: United Kingdom; Channel Islands; Isle of Man; Australia; New Zealand; Newfoundland; Every colony; Every British protectorate; Every League of Nations mandated territory administered by the United Kingdom, Australia or New Zealand; Every other country or territory in which the Crown has jurisdiction in matters of prize; (Note: Section 4(1). Section 4(1)(c), which extended the act to British India and British Burma, has been repealed.)

Dates
- Royal assent: 1 September 1939
- Commencement: 1 September 1939 (Note: The Acts of Parliament (Commencement) Act 1793.)
Other legislation
Amends	Naval Prize Act 1864
Amended by	Defence (Transfer of Functions) Act 1964; Statute Law (Repeals) Act 1995

Status: Partially repealed

Text of statute as originally enacted

Revised text of statute as amended

Text of the Prize Act 1939 as in force today (including any amendments) within the United Kingdom, from legislation.gov.uk.

The Prize Act 1939 (2 & 3 Geo. 6. c. 65) is an act of the Parliament of the United Kingdom. It extended prize law from ships and goods carried by them to aircraft and goods carried in them, both in flight and on land, amending the Naval Prize Act 1864 but identifying twelve sections of it that did not apply to aircraft (Section 1 and Schedule Parts I and II). Prize courts to administer them could be set up in any British possession or protectorate or any British League of Nations mandate (Section 2). The Act itself extended to the United Kingdom, the Channel Islands, the Isle of Man, Australia, New Zealand, British India, British Burma, Newfoundland and every other British colony, protectorate and mandate. The Act has no outstanding effects, though its application to India and Burma was only formally repealed by s. 1 Sch. 1 Pt. 2 of the Statute Law (Repeals) Act 1995.

== Subsequent developments ==
In section 2(2), the words "The Admiralty" were substituted by "The Secretary of State" by section 3(2) of the Defence (Transfer of Functions) Act 1964 (c. 15).

Section 4(1)(c), which extended the act to British India and British Burma, was repealed by section 1 of, and part II of schedule 1 to, the Statute Law (Repeals) Act 1995, which came into force on 8 November 1995.
