= Nottinghamshire and Derbyshire Tramways Company =

Tram system in Derbyshire, England

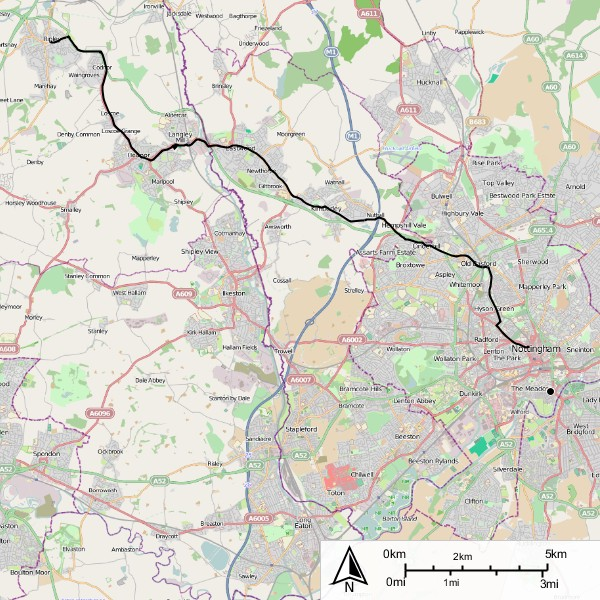
- Map of the route of the Nottinghamshire and Derbyshire Tramway

Operation
- Locale: Nottingham, Langley Mill, Ripley, Derbyshire
- Open: 4 July 1913
- Close: 5 October 1933
- Status: Closed
- Routes: Nottingham to Ripley, Derbyshire

Infrastructure
- Track gauge: 1,435 mm (4 ft 8 1/2 in)
- Propulsion system: Electric
- Depot: Langley Mill

Statistics
- Route length: 11 miles (18 km)

The Nottinghamshire and Derbyshire Tramways Company was formed in 1903 to build a tramway linking Nottingham, Derby, and Ilkeston, in Derbyshire, England. But only a short section was built.

== Construction ==
The Nottinghamshire and Derbyshire Tramways Company was formed in 1903 but it was not until 1913 that the tramway opened from Ripley to Nottingham, by way of Langley Mill, Eastwood and Kimberley. The capital was funded by Balfour Beatty & Co., of Ilkeston. Many of the bridges which can be seen along the route date from this time (for example, the bridge over the canal at Langley Mill, that had previously been a wooden construction).

Nottinghamshire and Derbyshire Tramways Act 1903 (Note: Section 1.)
- Act of Parliament
- Parliament of the United Kingdom
- Long title: An Act to incorporate the Nottinghamshire and Derbyshire Tramways Company and to empower that Company to make and maintain tramways and other works in the counties of Nottingham and Derby and for other purposes.
- Citation: 3 Edw. 7. c. cci
- Territorial extent: United Kingdom

Dates
- Royal assent: 11 August 1903
- Commencement: 11 August 1903 (Note: The Acts of Parliament (Commencement) Act 1793.)

Other legislation
- Amended by: Statute Law (Repeals) Act 1995

Status: Partially repealed

Text of statute as originally enacted

The original Nottinghamshire and Derbyshire Tramways Company Bill of 1902 was an ambitious application which proposed the building of 79 miles (127 km) of track to link together the tramway systems of Nottingham, Derby and Ilkeston. However, when passed the following year the Nottinghamshire and Derbyshire Tramways Act 1903 (3 Edw. 7. c. cci) only authorized the construction of 39 miles (63 km) of route, of which only 11 miles (18 km) were laid, the section from Ripley to Cinderhill. This was the beginning of the service known locally as the Ripley Rattlers.

== Operation ==
The first tramcar services started on 4 July 1913, only 5 months after linelaying had begun. This was between Loscoe and Kimberley, and the section to Cinderhill was opened a month later. The completed line from Cinderhill to Ripley opened on 1 January 1914 which made it possible to travel from Nottingham to Ripley, a distance of 15 miles (24 km), in 1 hr 40 mins. The trams ran 18 hours a day, except for Sunday when the service was reduced. Fares were a penny a mile. Workmen boarding before 8 am were able to obtain return tickets at single prices, while colliers journeying to and from the pits were charged a penny regardless of the length of their journey. The first trams left the depot at 4.30 am, while the last tram, 'The Flyer', left Nottingham at 11pm with limited stops only.

It was, by reputation, the most dangerous tramcar service in the British Isles, due to the length of its route, and the gradients it negotiated. The line was the subject of a short story by D. H. Lawrence:

There is in the North a single-line system of tramcars which boldly leaves the county town and plunges off into the black, industrial countryside . . . . . This, the most dangerous tram-service in England, as the authorities themselves declare, with pride, is entirely conducted by girls, and driven by rash young men, or else by invalids who creep forward in terror.

— Tickets Please

In 1916, the company also took over the Ilkeston Corporation Tramways, but the routes of the two companies never joined (and being different gauges, this seemed an unlikely proposition).

== Mergers ==
During the 1920s, the improved performance of motor transport gave significant competition to the trams from the many early omnibus companies. Not to be left out, in 1920 Balfour Beatty established the Midland General Omnibus Company (it was initially called the General, but changed its name after buying the Midland Bus Company from Kimberley). The M.G.O. shared the Notts & Derbys base at Langley Mill.

The three Balfour Beatty companies, the Midland General Omnibus Company, the Notts and Derbys Tramways Company and the older Mansfield District Traction Company, formed a single group of companies called the Midland General Group. The Midland General snapped up many of the smaller companies in the area in the 1920s and 1930s, taking over Brewin and Hudson of Heanor, Williamson & Son of Heanor, J.T.Boam of Ilkeston, and the Heanor & District Omnibus Company.

The Midland General Group was nationalised in 1948 along with Balfour Beatty's electricity supply interests, passing to the British Transport Commission the same year and to the Transport Holding Company in 1963, and becoming part of the National Bus Company in 1969.

== Decline and closure ==
By 1928, Nottinghamshire & Derbyshire was given power to operate a trolley bus system. The first trolley buses were introduced in 1931, and on 5 October 1933 the last tram ran on the Nottingham to Ripley route. The trolley bus system was very efficient and reliable, the journey from Ripley to Nottingham taking 90 minutes.

Trolley bus operation continued until 25 April 1953, when they gave way to the bus. The fleet of trolley buses was sold to Bradford Corporation.

Near to the Queen Adelaide pub in Swingate, there is an old cable pole (or what looks like one).
