= List of statutory instruments of the United Kingdom, 1956 =

This is an incomplete list of statutory instruments of the United Kingdom in 1956.

== Statutory instruments ==
=== 1-999 ===
- East Lothian Water Board Order 1956 (SI 1956/65)
- Coal Industry (Superannuation Scheme) (Winding Up, No. 10) Regulations 1956 (SI 1956/248)
- Airways Corporations (General Staff Pensions) (Amendment) Regulations 1956 (SI 1956/305)
- Pupils' Registration Regulations 1956 (SI 1956/357)
- Police Pensions Regulations 1956 (SI 1956/385)
- Prevention of Damage by Pests (Application to Shipping) (Amendment No. 2) Order 1956 (SI 1956/420)
- Police Pensions (Scotland) Regulations 1956 (SI 1956/434)
- Sheriffs' Fees (Amendment) Order 1956 (SI 1956/502) (L. 5)
- Board of Inquiry (Air Force) Rules 1956 (SI 1956/579)
- Double Taxation Relief (Taxes on Income) (Federation of Rhodesia and Nyasaland) Order 1956 (SI 1956/619)
- Board of Inquiry (Army) Rules 1956 (SI 1956/630)
- Civil Service Commission (Fees) Order 1956 (SI 1956/674)
- National Insurance (Modification of the London Transport and Railway Pension Schemes) Regulations 1956 (SI 1956/732)
- Seal Fisheries (Crown Colonies and Protectorates) (Amendment) Order in Council 1956 (SI 1956/838)
- Foreign Compensation Commission Rules 1956 (SI 1956/962)
- Double Taxation Relief (Estate Duty) (India) Order 1956 (SI 1956/998)

=== 1000-1999 ===
- Administration of Justice Act (Commencement) Order 1956 (SI 1956/1065)
- Navy and Marines (Property of Deceased) Order 1956 (SI 1956/1217)
- Visiting Forces (Designation) (Colonies) (Amendment) Order 1956 (SI 1956/1368)
- Sheffield Water Order 1956 (SI 1956/1454)
- Sheffield Water (Charges etc.) Order 1956 (SI 1956/1455)
- Mines and Quarries Act 1954 (Commencement) Order 1956 (SI 1956/1530)
- Post Office Register (Trustee Savings Banks) (Amendment) Regulations 1956 (SI 1956/1670)
- Family Allowances, National Insurance and Industrial Injuries (Refugees) Order 1956 (SI 1956/1698)
- Governors' Pensions (Commutation) Order 1956 (SI 1956/1736)
- Coal and Other Mines (Surveyors and Plans) Regulations 1956 (SI 1956/1760)
- Coal and Other Mines (General Duties and Conduct) Order 1956 (SI 1956/1761)
- Coal and Other Mines (Ventilation) Order 1956 (SI 1956/1764)
- Coal and Other Mines (Safety-Lamps and Lighting) Order 1956 (SI 1956/1765)
- Coal and Other Mines (Electricity) Order 1956 (SI 1956/1766)
- Coal and Other Mines (Fire and Rescue) Order 1956 (SI 1956/1768)
- Coal Mines (Precautions against Inflammable Dust) Order 1956 (SI 1956/1769)
- Coal and Other Mines (Locomotives) Order 1956 (SI 1956/1771)
- Coal and Other Mines (Steam Boilers) Order 1956 (SI 1956/1772)
- Coal and Other Mines (Sidings) Order 1956 (SI 1956/1773)
- Coal and Other Mines (Sanitary Conveniences) Order 1956 (SI 1956/1776)
- Coal and Other Mines (Horses) Order 1956 (SI 1956/1777)
- Miscellaneous Mines Order 1956 (SI 1956/1778)
- Miscellaneous Mines (Electricity) Order 1956 (SI 1956/1779)
- Quarries Order 1956 (SI 1956/1780)
- Quarries (Electricity) Order 1956 (SI 1956/1781)
- Census of Distribution (1958) (Restriction on Disclosure) Order 1956 (SI 1956/1860)
- Greenwich Hospital School (Regulations) (Amendment) Order 1956 (SI 1956/1894)
- Merchant Shipping (Certificates of Competency as A.B.) (New Zealand) Order 1956 (SI 1956/1895)
- Coal Mines (Cardox and Hydrox) Regulations 1956 (SI 1956/1942)
- Stratified Ironstone, Shale and Fireclay Mines (Explosives) Regulations 1956 (SI 1956/1943)
- National Library of Wales (Delivery of Books) (Amendment) Regulations 1956 (SI 1956/1978)

=== 2000-2999 ===
- Mines (Manner of Search for Smoking Materials) Order 1956 (SI 1956/2016)
- Visiting Forces (Designation) Order 1956 (SI 1956/2041)
- Visiting Forces (Military Courts-Martial) (Amendment) Order 1956 (SI 1956/2043)
- Visiting Forces (Royal New Zealand Air Force) (Amendment) Order 1956 (SI 1956/2044)
- Sheriffs' Fees (Amendment No. 2) Order 1956 (SI 1956/2081) (L. 24)
- Aberayron Harbour Order 1956 (SI 1956/2114)

== See also ==
- List of statutory instruments of the United Kingdom
