= List of statutory instruments of the United Kingdom, 1951 =

This is an incomplete list of statutory instruments of the United Kingdom in 1951.

== Statutory instruments ==
=== 1-499 ===
- Merchant Shipping (Registration of Sierra Leone Government Ships) Order 1951 (SI 1951/143)
- Trading with the Enemy (Custodian) Order 1951 (SI 1951/153)
- National Assistance (Adaptation of Enactments) Regulations 1950 1951 (SI 1951/174)
- Superannuation (English Local Government and Isle of Man) Interchange Rules 1951 (SI 1951/309)
- Coal Industry (Superannuation Scheme) (Winding Up, No. 2) Regulations 1951 (SI 1951/393)

=== 500-999 ===
- Airways Corporations (Pilots Pensions) Regulations 1951 (SI 1951/527)
- Veterinary Surgeons (University Degrees) (Glasgow) Order of Council 1951 (SI 1951/571)
- Higham Ferrers and Rushden Water Board Order 1951 (SI 1951/574)
- Trading with the Enemy (Custodian) (No. 2) Order 1951 (SI 1951/779)
- Trading with the Enemy (Custodian) (No. 3) Order 1951 (SI 1951/780)
- Conveyance of Explosives Byelaws 1951 (SI 1951/869)
- Prevention of Damage by Pests (Application to Shipping) Order 1951 (SI 1951/967)
- National Insurance and Industrial Injuries (Reciprocal Multilateral Agreement) (France and the Netherlands) Order 1951 (SI 1951/972)

=== 1000-1499 ===
- Cupro-Nickel Coins (Carriers' Liability) Regulations 1951 (SI 1951/1032)
- Consular Conventions (Kingdom of Norway) Order in Council 1951 (SI 1951/1165)
- Luxembourg (Extradition) Order in Council 1951 (SI 1951/1170)
- National Insurance Act 1951 (Commencement) Order 1951 (SI 1951/1213)
- State Scholarships Regulations 1951 (SI 1951/1214)
- Leasehold Property (Temporary Provisions) (Shops) Regulations 1951 (SI 1951/1215)
- Felixstowe and District Water Order 1951 (SI 1951/1216)
- Administration of Children's Homes Regulations 1951 (SI 1951/1217)
- Motor Vehicles (Construction and Use) (Amendment) (No. 2) Regulations 1951 (SI 1951/1213)
- Workmen's Compensation Rules 1951 (SI 1951/1235)
- Reserve and Auxiliary Forces (Protection of Civil Interests) Rules 1951 (SI 1951/1401)
- Reserve and Auxiliary Forces (Protection of Civil Interests) (Business Premises) Regulations 1951 (SI 1951/1402)
- Reserve and Auxiliary Forces (Protection of Industrial Assurance &c. Policies) Regulations 1951 (SI 1951/1407)
- Reserve and Auxiliary Forces (Protection of Friendly Society Life Policies) Regulations 1951 (SI 1951/1408)

=== 1500-1999 ===
- Tithe Fees Rules 1951 (SI 1951/1534
- Corn Rent Annuities (Apportionment and Redemption) Rules 1951 (SI 1951/1535)
- Trading with the Enemy (Custodian) (No. 4) Order 1951 (SI 1951/1625)
- Trading with the Enemy (Custodian) (No. 5) Order 1951 (SI 1951/1626)
- Hydrogen Cyanide (Fumigation of Buildings) Regulations 1951 (SI 1951/1759)
- Hydrogen Cyanide (Fumigation of Ships) Regulations 1951 (SI 1951/1760)
- National Insurance and Industrial Injuries (Reciprocal Multilateral Agreement) (Belgium) Order 1951 (SI 1951/1801)
- Hill Farming Improvements (Settled Land and Trusts for Sale) Regulations 1951 (SI 1951/1816)
- Distribution of German Enemy Property (No. 2) Order 1951 (SI 1951/1899)

=== 2000-2499 ===
- Coal Industry (Superannuation Scheme) (Winding Up, No. 3) Regulations 1951 (SI 1951/2010)
- Superannuation (Local Government Staffs) (National Service) (Amendment) Rules 1951 (SI 1951/2145)
- Town and Country Planning (Construction and Improvement of Private Streets) Regulations 1951 (SI 1951/2224)

== See also ==
- List of statutory instruments of the United Kingdom
