= List of statutory instruments of the United Kingdom, 1962 =

This is an incomplete list of statutory instruments of the United Kingdom in 1962.

== Statutory instruments ==
=== 1-499 ===
- Lakes and Lune Water Board Order 1961 (SI 1962/36)
- Overseas Service Superannuation (Amendment) Order 1962 (SI 1962/44)
- Superannuation (National Fire Service and Fire Brigades) Transfer Rules 1962 (SI 1962/109)
- Post Office Register (Trustee Savings Banks) (Amendment) Regulations 1962 (SI 1962/112)
- Superannuation (Transfer of Hostels Staff) Rules 1962 (SI 2962/158)
- Visiting Forces Act (Application to the Isle of Man) Order 1962 (SI 1962/170)
- Sandwith Anhydrite Mine (Lighting) Special Regulations 1962 (SI 1962/192)
- Commonwealth Telegraphs (Cable and Wireless Ltd. Pension) Regulations 1962 (SI 1962/196)
- Construction (General Provisions) Reports Order 1962 (SI 1962/224)
- Construction (Lifting Operations) Reports Order 1962 (SI 1962/225)
- Construction (Lifting Operations) Prescribed Particulars Order 1962 (SI 1962/226)
- Rombalds Water Board Order 1962 (SI 1962/271)
- London Cab Order 1962 (SI 1962/289)
- Deeds of Arrangement (Amendment) Rules 1962 (SI 1962/297) (L. 5)
- Thistleton Mine Special Regulations 1962 (SI 1962/364)
- Pembrokeshire Water Board Order 1962 (SI 1962/389)
- Sovereign Base Areas of Akrotiri and Dhekelia (Boundaries) Order 1962 (SI 1962/396)
- Statutory Orders (Special Procedure) Order 1962 (SI 1962/409)
- Stockport and District Water Board Order 1962 (SI 1962/467)
- Sheffield Water (Regrouping) Order 1962 (SI 1962/478)
- Rotherham Corporation Water Order 1962 (SI 1962/485)

=== 500-999 ===
- Ely, Mildenhall and Newmarket Water Board Order 1962 (SI 1962/503)
- British Wool Marketing Scheme (Amendment) Order 1962 (SI 1962/622)
- Reciprocal Enforcement of Foreign Judgments (Norway) Order 1962 (SI 1962/636)
- Consular Conventions (Income Tax) (Spanish State) Order 1962 (SI 1962/638)
- Evidence (Barbados) Order 1962 (SI 1962/641)
- Evidence (Hong Kong) Order 1962 (SI 1962/642)
- Evidence (Jamaica) Order 1962 (SI 1962/643)
- Evidence (Montserrat) Order 1962 (SI 1962/644)
- Trustee Investments (Additional Powers) Order 1962 (SI 1962/658)
- Housing (Management of Houses in Multiple Occupation) Regulations 1962 (SI 1962/668)
- Tendring Hundred Water (No. 2) Order 1962 (SI 1962/761)
- North West Wilts Water Board Order 1962 (SI 1962/813)
- South Lincolnshire Water Board Order 1962 (SI 1962/840)
- Exchange of Securities Rules 1962 (SI 1962/868)
- British Transport Commission Group Pension Funds Regulations 1962 (SI 1962/898)
- Exchange of Securities (No. 2) Rules 1962 (SI 1962/906)
- Trunk Roads (40 m.p.h. Speed Limit Direction) (No.27) Order 1962 (SI 1962/973)

=== 1000-1499 ===
- Cambridge Waterworks Order 1962 (SI 1962/1030)
- Exchange of Securities (No. 3) Rules 1962 (SI 1962/1219)
- Sheffield (Amendment of Local Enactment) Order 1962 (SI 1962/1249)
- Food and Drugs (Legal Proceedings) Regulations 1962 (SI 1962/1287)
- Exempt Charities Order 1962 (SI 1962/1343)
- Great Ouse River Board (Burnt Fen Internal Drainage District) Order 1962 (SI 1962/1439)

=== 1500-1999 ===
- Jamaica (Constitution) Order in Council 1962 (SI 1962/1500)
- Force Crag Mine (Storage Battery Locomotives) Special Regulations 1962 (SI 1962/1501)
- North West Worcestershire Water Board Order 1962 (SI 1962/1561)
- Exchange of Securities (Consolidation) Rules 1962 (SI 1962/1562)
- Visiting Forces Act (Application to Colonies) (Amendment) Order 1962 (SI 1962/1638)
- Visiting Forces (Designation) (Sovereign Base Areas of Akrotiri and Dhekelia) Order 1962 (SI 1962/1639)
- Non-ferrous Metals (Melting and Founding) Regulations 1962 (SI 1962/1667)
- Opencast Coal (Notice of Work) (Amendment) Regulations 1962 (SI 1962/1696)
- Land Drainage (General) (Amendment) Regulations 1962 (SI 1962/1734)
- River Taw Mussel Fishery Order 1962 (SI 1962/1751)
- Transport Act 1962 (Commencement No. 1) Order 1962 (SI 1962/1788)
- Eden Water Board Order 1962 (SI 1962/1796)
- Nationalised Transport (London Fares) Order 1962 (SI 1962/1880)
- Doncaster and District Joint Water Board Order 1962 (SI 1962/1924)
- Calder Water Board Order 1962 (SI 1962/1939)

=== 2000-2499 ===
- Cambridge Waterworks (No. 2) Order 1962 (SI 1962/2130)
- Exchange of Securities (No. 4) Rules 1962 (SI 1962/2140)
- Rules of the Supreme Court (Revision) 1962 (SI 1962/2145)
- Several and Regulated Fisheries (Form of Application) Regulations 1962 (SI 1962/2158)
- Exchange of Securities (No. 5) Rules 1962 (SI 1962/2167)
- Copyright (Virgin Islands) Order 1962 (SI 1962/2185)
- Transport Holding Company (Procedure) Order 1962 (SI 1962/2281)
- Evidence by Certificate Rules 1962 (SI 1962/2319)
- Control of Dogs on Roads Orders (Procedure) (England and Wales) Regulations 1962 (SI 1962/2340)
- Double Taxation Relief (Taxes on Income) (South Africa) Order 1962 (SI 1962/2352)
- Sheriffs' Fees (Amendment) Order 1962 (SI 1962/2417)
- Post-War Credit (Income Tax) Amendment Regulations 1962 (SI 1962/2455)
- Exchange of Securities (No. 6) Rules 1962 (SI 1962/2486)

=== 2500-2877 ===
- Veterinary Surgery (Exemptions) Order 1962 (SI 1962/2557)
- Evidence (British Antarctic Territory) Order 1962 (SI 1962/2605)
- Evidence (Certain Provinces of Canada) Order 1962 (SI 1962/2606)
- Evidence (Falkland Islands) Order 1962 (SI 1962/2607)
- Evidence (Seychelles) Order 1962 (SI 1962/2608)
- Evidence (Sierra Leone) Order 1962 SI (1962/2609)
- Trustee Investments (Additional Powers) (No. 2) Order 1962 (SI 1962/2611)
- Transport Act 1962 (Vesting Date) Order 1962 (SI 1962/2634)
- Radioactive Substances (Fire Detectors) Exemption Order 1962 (SI 1962/2640)
- Radioactive Substances (Civil Defence) Exemption Order 1962 (SI 1962/2641)
- Radioactive Substances (Electronic Valves) Exemption Order 1962 (SI 1962/2642)
- Radioactive Substances (Testing Instruments) Exemption Order 1962 (SI 1962/2643)
- Radioactive Substances (Luminous Articles) Exemption Order 1962 (SI 1962/2644)
- Radioactive Substances (Exhibitions) Exemption Order 1962 (SI 1962/2645)
- Radioactive Substances (Storage in Transit) Exemption Order 1962 (SI 1962/2646)
- Radioactive Substances (Phosphatic Substances, Rare Earths etc.) Exemption Order 1962 (SI 1962/2648)
- Radioactive Substances (Lead) Exemption Order 1962 (SI 1962/2649)
- London Transport (Consent Procedure) Regulations 1962 (SI 1962/2707)
- Radioactive Substances (Uranium and Thorium) Exemption Order 1962 (SI 1962/2710)
- Radioactive Substances (Prepared Uranium and Thorium Compounds) Exemption Order 1962 (SI 1962/2711)
- Radioactive Substances (Geological Specimens) Exemption Order 1962 (SI 1962/2712)
- British Transport Reorganisation (Pensions of Employees) (No. 1) Order 1962 (SI 1962/2714)
- British Transport Reorganisation (Pensions of Employees) (No. 2) Order 1962 (SI 1962/2715)
- National Insurance (Modification of the Police Pensions Act 1948) Regulations 1962 (SI 1962/2755)
- British Transport Reorganisation (Pensions of Employees) (No. 3) Order 1962 (SI 1962/2758)
- Double Taxation Relief (Taxes on Income) (South West Africa) Order 1962 (SI 1962/2788)
- Pipe-lines Act 1962 (Commencement) Order 1962 (SI 1962/2790))
- British Transport Reorganisation (Pensions of Employees) (No. 4) Order 1962 (SI 1962/2793)
- British Transport Reorganisation (Compensation to Employees) Regulations 1962 (SI 1962/2834)
- West Somerset Water Board Order 1962 (SI 1962/2871)
- Barnsley Water (Penistone Boreholes) Order 1962 (SI 1962/2873)
- Redistribution of Business (Revenue Paper) Order 1962 (SI 1962/2877)

== See also ==
List of statutory instruments of the United Kingdom
