= Aldercar High School =

Coordinates: 53°01′33″N 01°20′31″W

Location
- Daltons Close; Aldercar; Derbyshire, NG16 4HL; England

Information
- Type: Academy
- Motto: Philip
- Established: 1955
- Local authority: Derbyshire
- Trust: Embark Multi Academy Trust
- Department for Education URN: 149364 Tables
- Ofsted: Reports
- Head Teacher: Claire Hatto
- Gender: Coeducational
- Age: 11 to 19
- Enrolment: 676 as of April 2016
- Website: https://www.aldercarhigh.co.uk/

Aldercar High School is a coeducational secondary school and sixth form located in Aldercar, Derbyshire, England.

It is close to the A610 and Langley Mill Academy, and is next door to Aldercar Infants School.

== Admissions ==
The school's catchment area includes Aldercar, Langley Mill and Heanor. Students from Ilkeston, Eastwood, Codnor and Ripley also attend. As of 2021, the school had around 600 students.

== History ==
The school opened in September 1955 as a secondary modern school. It became Heanor Aldercar Comprehensive School, then Aldercar School. The school has been awarded specialist Language College status, and was named Aldercar Community Language College for a time before being renamed Aldercar High School.

In 2009, the Phoenix Centre Sixth Form building opened, offering courses for ages 16–19.

Previously a community school administered by Derbyshire County Council, in October 2022 Aldercar High School converted to academy status. The school is now sponsored by the Embark Multi Academy Trust.

== Notable former pupils ==
- Ron Haslam, world champion motorcycle racer
- Paris Simmons, footballer
- Nick Wright, footballer
- Paul Reece, footballer
- Chanel Cresswell, actress
- Adrian Hobson, Fellow of the Royal Society of Chemistry
