= Reuben Bosworth =

English clockmaker

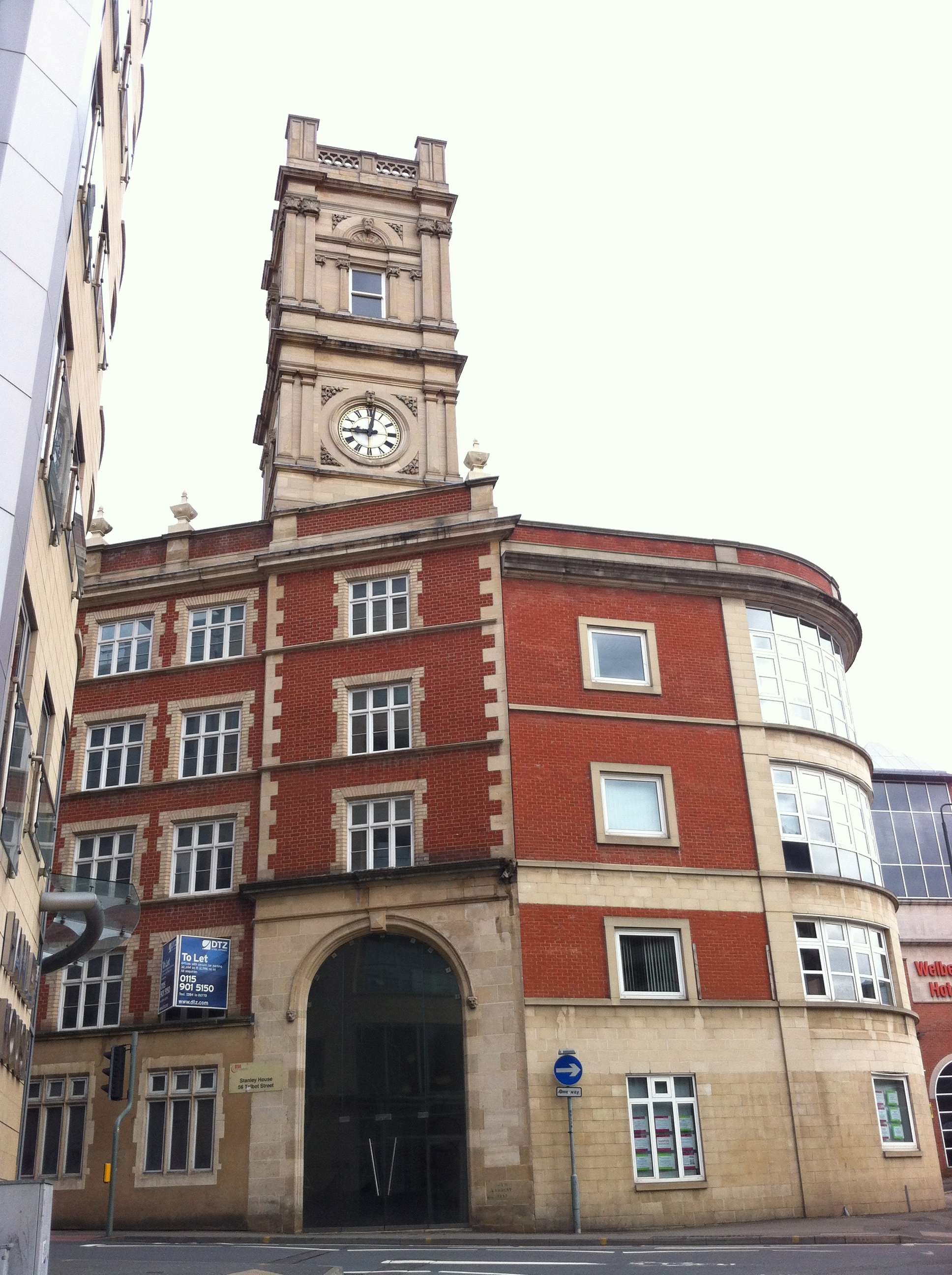
Clock on Lambert's Factory, Talbot Street, Nottingham, by Reuben Bosworth

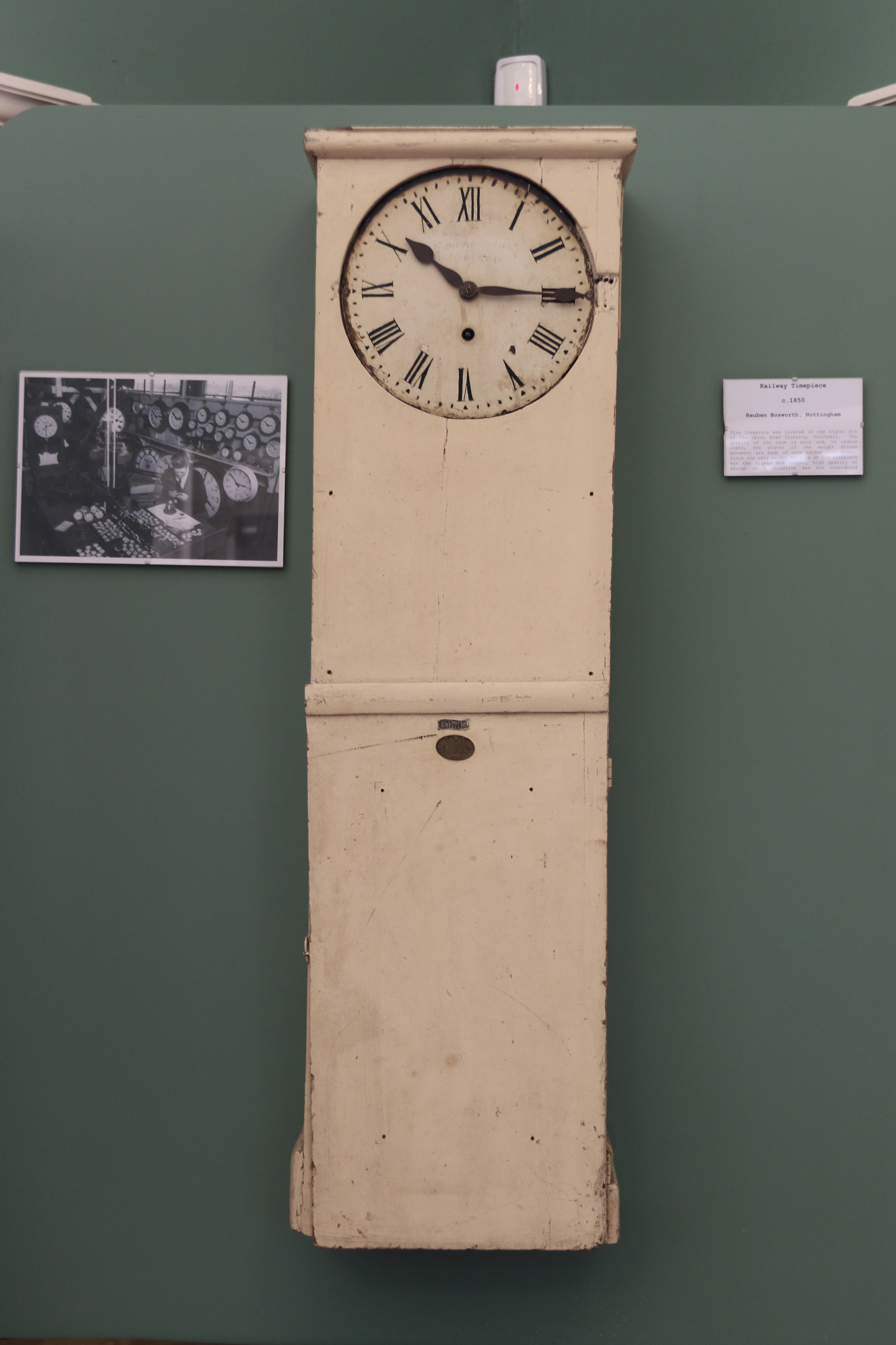
Clock made ca. 1850 for the signal box at the Upton Road crossing, Southwell, for the Midland Railway

Reuben Bosworth (ca.1797 – 26 July 1883) was a watch and clockmaker in Nottingham.

== Life ==
Bosworth was born around 1797 in Smisby, Derbyshire. Information about Bosworth's personal life is limited, but it is known that he was married to a woman named Sarah in 1856.

== Career ==
He was a watchmaker and clockmaker in Nottingham. He was apprenticed John Whitehurst in Derby, and then moved to Nottingham and succeeded William Hall, taking over his duties in regulating and winding the Nottingham Town Hall clock in 1833. In the financial year 1 September 1842 to 1 September 1843 it was reported that he received the annual salary of £18 18s. 0d (equivalent to £2,076.2 in 2025) for winding up and regulating the Exchange and Town-hall clocks. In 1842 he was employed by the Leicester corporation to illuminate the Exchange clock at Leicester with a single plate of glass, which would be the largest in the East Midlands.

In the Nottingham Review of 15 March 1844, an article appeared praising his work.

The Exchange Clock. We beg to draw the attention of our readers to the superior performance of this time keeper. The clock was made by Mr. Reuben Bosworth….and to such great accuracy has Mr. Bosworth regulated its rate of going, that, from the second of November last to the present time [March 1844] a period of four months, it has not varied half a minute.

He made turret clocks, some of which are still found in Nottinghamshire and Derbyshire, wall clocks which he sold to the Midland Railway which were used in railway offices and signal boxes, and longcase clocks and watches.

It is suggested that some of his turret clock business was taken over in 1845 by G. & F. Cope.

He died on 26 July 1883 leaving £7,861 3s 9d. (equivalent to £826,405 in 2025) to his wife.

== Works ==
He produced turret clocks for the following buildings:

- Nottingham Exchange 1837
- Priory Church of St. Peter, Thurgarton
- St Peter's Church, Nottingham 1847
- St Lawrence's Church, Gotham 1848
- St James' Church, Shardlow 1852
- St Swithun's Church, Woodborough, 1854
- St Michael's Church, Sutton Bonington 1860
- All Saints' Church, Cotgrave 1865
- St. Stephen's Church, Sneinton, 1865
- St James the Apostle's Church, Bonsall 1865
- St. Mary's Church, Arnold, 1867
- St Mary and All Saints' Church, Hawksworth ca. 1867
- All Saints' Church, Collingham, 1867
- Lambert's Factory, Nottingham
- St Mary's Church, Clifton
- All Saints' Church, Strelley 1868
- St Katherine's Church, Teversal 1876
- Nottingham Mechanics' Institution 1877
- Priory Church of St Peter, Thurgarton 1879
