= St Andrew's Church, Langley Mill =

Church in Derbyshire, England

- Anglican Methodist Church, Langley Mill
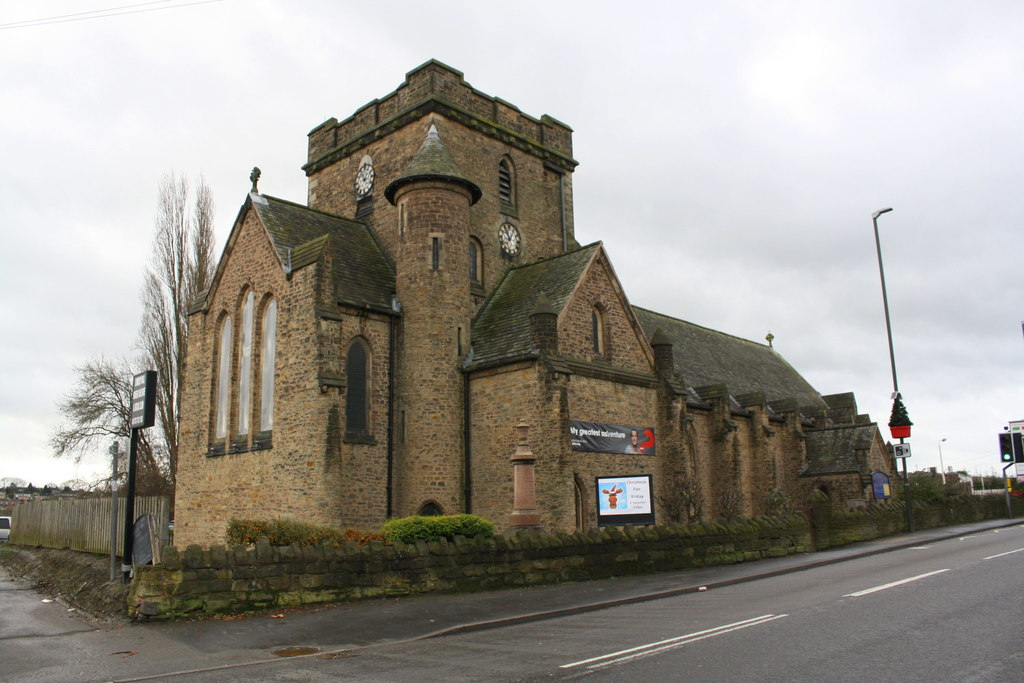
- The church in 2017

- Location within Derbyshire
- 53.018168°N 1.333175°W
- Location: Langley Mill, Derbyshire,
- Country: England
- Denomination: Church of England
- Website: standrewsonline.org.uk

History
- Status: Active
- Founded: 1911
- Dedication: St Andrew
- Dedicated: 1913
- Consecrated: 1912

Architecture
- Functional status: Parish Church
- Heritage designation: Grade II
- Designated: May 1988
- Architect: John Sydney Brocklesby
- Architectural type: Arts and Crafts
- Style: Arts and Crafts
- Groundbreaking: 1911
- Completed: 1913
- Construction cost: £8,000

Administration
- Province: Canterbury
- Diocese: Derby
- Parish: Aldercar and Langley Mill

Clergy
- Vicar(s): Revd Peter Hallsworth (Anglican Minister) and Revd Helen Penfold (Methodist Minister)

St Andrew's Church is the parish church of Langley Mill in Derbyshire, England. It was built in 1911 by John Sydney Brocklesby and was dedicated to Saint Andrew in 1912 by the Bishop of Southwell. In 1926, the church became part of the Diocese of Derby. The church is an active place of worship and community hub. It was designated a Grade II listed building in 1988 by Historic England.

== History ==
The church was built between 1911 and 1913, replacing an earlier place of worship above a builder's merchants on Elnor Street which had become too small for the congregation. The architect J S Brocklesby was engaged to build a new church at a cost of £8,000 (£780,056.08 in 2024 with inflation). The church was built in the Arts and Crafts style, which was quite unusual for the period when the Gothic Revival style was more commonly used. The church was completed in 1913, a year prior it had been consecrated by the Bishop of Southwell. In 1926 it became part of the Diocese of Derby, and assumed a joint Methodist and Anglican congregation in 1987. A year later, it was listed as Grade II by Historic England.

St Andrew's remains an active place of worship.

== Organ ==
The church contains a 2 manual and pedal pipe organ by the Johnson Organ Company of Derby dating from 1989.

== Clock ==
The tower clock was built at a cost of £100 (equivalent to £9,900 in 2025) by G.F. Cope of Nottingham and dedicated on 28 December 1912. It comprised 4 dials on the outside of the tower which were illuminated at night.

== See also ==
- Grade II listed buildings in Derbyshire
- Listed buildings in Derbyshire
