= Car Colston =

English Midland village in Nottinghamshire, England

Coordinates: 52.977°N 0.932°W

- Village and civil parish
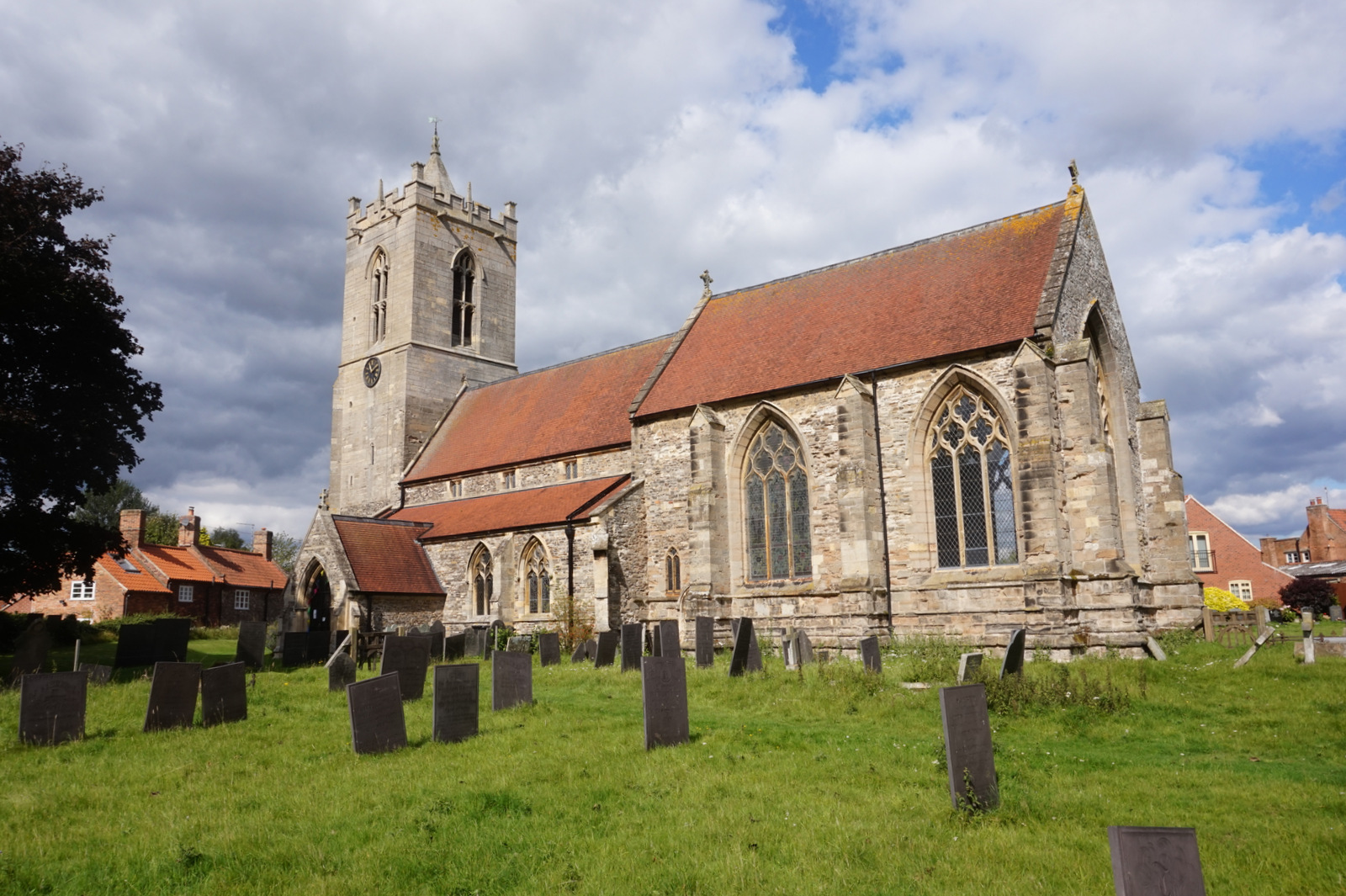
- St Mary’s Church

- Location within Nottinghamshire
- Interactive map of Car Colston
- Area: 2.56 sq mi (6.6 km^{2})
- Population: 171 (2021 Census)
  - Density: 67/sq mi (26/km^{2})
- OS grid reference: SK 719427
  - London: 105 mi (169 km) SSE
- District: Rushcliffe
- Shire county: Nottinghamshire
- Region: East Midlands
- Country: England
- Sovereign state: United Kingdom
- Post town: NOTTINGHAM
- Postcode district: NG13
- Dialling code: 01949
- Police: Nottinghamshire
- Fire: Nottinghamshire
- Ambulance: East Midlands
- UK Parliament: Newark

Car Colston is an English village and civil parish in the Rushcliffe borough of Nottinghamshire. The population of the civil parish at the time of the 2011 census was 185, falling to 171 at the 2021 census.

== Location and transport ==
Car Colston lies just off the A46 (the Fosse Way), 3 miles (4.8 km) north of Bingham and 2 miles (3.2 km) west of East Bridgford. It is also adjacent to Little Green, Screveton, Scarrington and Newton.

There are seven buses a day that stop at Car Colston between Nottingham and Newark-on-Trent on Mondays to Saturdays . The nearest railway station is at Bingham, which has services every one or two hours towards Nottingham, Grantham or Skegness.

== Governance ==
Since the parish is small, it has a parish meeting instead of a parish council. The village forms a conservation area, which was last reviewed and extended in June 2009.

The member of Parliament (MP) for the Newark constituency, to which Car Colston belongs, is the Conservative Robert Jenrick.

Now in Rushcliffe borough, it was formerly in Bingham Rural District and before 1894 in Bingham Wapentake.

== Amenities ==
There are retail, medical and other services at Bingham. The village pub is the Royal Oak on The Green, which is a feature of the village.

Car Colston has a private pre-school at Old Hall Farm. There are primary schools at East Bridgford (2 miles, 3.2 km) and Bingham. Toot Hill School in Bingham is a secondary school with a sixth form and academy status.

The parish church is dedicated to St Mary the Virgin. It forms a joint Anglican parish with St Wilfrid's Church, Screveton. They both belong, with Flintham, Kneeton and East Bridgford, to the Fosse Group of Parishes. A service of Holy Communion is held once a month. The Methodist church at Scarrington (1.7 miles, 2.7 km) has a Sunday evening service every other week and a Bible study group.

Car Colston Cricket Club plays on the village common every Sunday in summer months. It was founded in 1864. The Annual Presidents' Day celebration for the club sees them play local rivals Flintham Cricket Club for the John Gilbert Trophy. Gilbert played for the club all his life until his passing in 2015. On Presidents' Day some 250 people attend a summer luncheon and watch the match from a marquee.

== Toponymy ==
The place appears as Colestone in the Domesday survey of 1086, but as Kyrcoluiston in 1242, and variants thereof subsequently. The original affix, Old Norse kirkja, 'church', was later confusingly replaced by Middle English ker, meaning 'fenland'. The suffix seems to contain an Old Norse personal name Kolr + tūn (Old English), an enclosure; a farmstead; a village; an estate.., so 'Kolr's farm/settlement'.

== Heritage ==
The earliest signs of human occupation date from the Bronze Age. There are remains of the foundations of a Roman villa in the south-west corner of the village. The village appears as "Colestone" in the 1086 Domesday Book, which records three manors. Car Colston was the home of the notable local historian Robert Thoroton (1623–1678). Most of the present-day buildings date from the 18th and early 19th centuries. The village has 13 listed historic buildings, which are listed at the end of the Conservation Area Appraisal Report.

The population of Car Colston was 152 in 1801, 213 in 1821, and 249 in 1831.

== Village greens ==
The two conspicuous village greens (the 16 1/2 acres (6.7 ha) acre Large Common and the 5 1/2 acres (2.2 ha) Little Common) originated in the Elizabethan era. They are alternatively known as Large Green and Little Green. Large Green in particular is reputedly the largest green in England. In 1598 landowners had fields within the parish enclosed, but agreed on leaving the greens open so that cottagers could graze their cattle, geese and horses. Three roads from the village show fence posts put in place to support gates preventing the animals escaping, which have since been removed to allow vehicular access. These rights are still in use and the parish Common Rights Committee continue to enforce them.

== See also ==
- Listed buildings in Car Colston
