= Woodlinkin =

Village in Derbyshire, England

Coordinates: 53.0343°N 1.3590°W

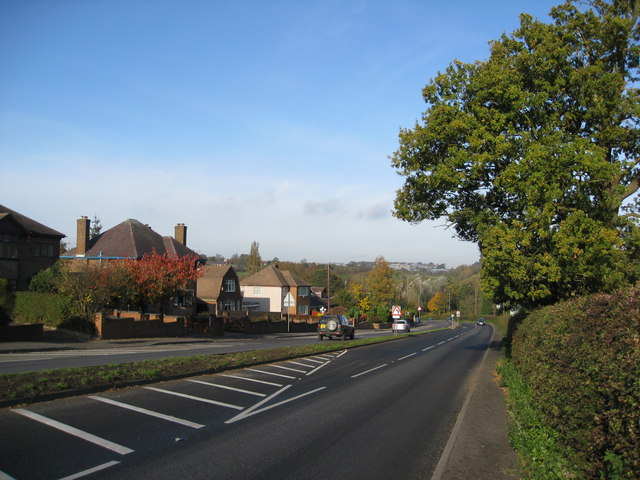
- The A610 road at Woodlinkin.

- Location within Derbyshire
- OS grid reference: SK42974878
- District: Amber Valley
- Shire county: Derbyshire
- Region: East Midlands
- Country: England
- Sovereign state: United Kingdom
- Post town: NOTTINGHAM
- Postcode district: NG16
- Dialling code: 01773
- Police: Derbyshire
- Fire: Derbyshire
- Ambulance: East Midlands
- UK Parliament: Amber Valley

Woodlinkin is a village in Derbyshire, on the A610 road between the villages of Codnor and Aldercar.
