= Codnor Castle =

Ruined castle in Derbyshire, England

- Aldercar and Langley Mill, Amber Valley, Derbyshire
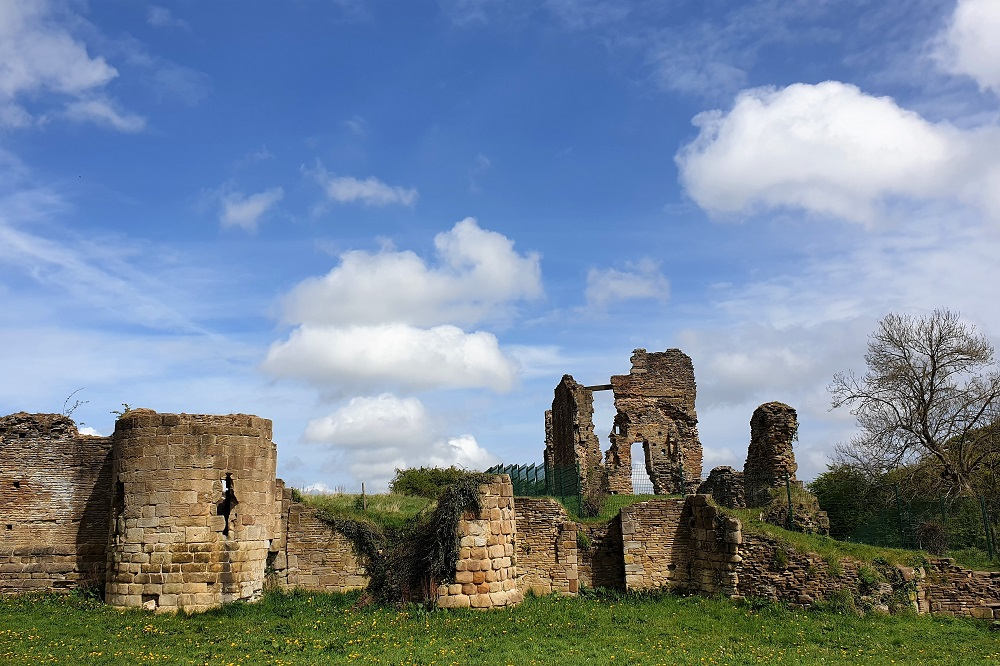
- Remains of Codnor Castle, viewed from the lower court

Site information
- Condition: Ruined

Location
- Shown within Derbyshire
- Coordinates: 53°02′43″N 1°21′17″W

Site history
- Built: 13th century
- Materials: stone

Scheduled monument
- Official name: Codnor Castle
- Reference no.: 1007047

Listed Building – Grade II
- Official name: Remains of Codnor Castle, Castle Lane
- Designated: 25 November 1963
- Reference no.: 1109025

Codnor Castle is a ruined 13th-century castle in Derbyshire, England. The land around Codnor came under the jurisdiction of William Peverel after the Norman Conquest. The building is registered as a Scheduled Ancient Monument a Grade II Listed Building and is officially a Building at Risk.

== History ==
=== William Peverel ===
The castle is a stone keep and bailey fortress, and was established by William Peverel. The present fragmentary remains represent a three-storey keep and a strong curtain wall and ditch, flanked by round towers. The outer bailey is on a lower level, and was constructed at a later period. The castle overlooks the Erewash valley and the counties of Derbyshire and Nottinghamshire. It originally had a deep moat, and on its eastern side, there was once a considerable abundance of trees, which have now been cut down. On the west side, there was a courtyard that was strongly fortified by huge round towers, which had battlements. In other parts of the ruins, there is evidence that the outer walls had arrow-loops included to allow bowmen to use them if necessary.

=== Henry de Grey ===
By 1211, it was owned by Henry de Grey, a descendant of the Norman knight Anchetil de Greye. Henry's descendants include the long line of Lords Grey of Codnor, the Lords Grey of Ruthyn, Wilton and Rotherfield, Lady Jane Grey and the Earls of Stamford, and the extinct families of the Dukes of Suffolk and Kent. His son Richard settled in Codnor and was a loyal Baron to Henry III. Along with his brother John, they served the King in the Holy Land. John Grey distinguished himself in the Scottish wars, and found himself in great favour with Edward III. Together with William D'Eincourt, the Lord Grey commanded all the knights of Derbyshire and Nottinghamshire in case of an invasion. Henry, the last of the family, died during the reign of Henry VII without a legitimate heir. He left part of his lands to his illegitimate sons, Henry and Richard, and part to his widow, Katherine Stourton.

=== Zouche family ===
The remainder went to his aunt Elizabeth Grey, who in 1429 married Sir John Zouche, the youngest son of the fourth Baron Zouche of Harringworth. Sir John Zouche of Codnor was three times High Sheriff of Derbyshire. The castle remained in the hands of the Zouche family for two hundred years until they sold up and emigrated to Virginia in 1634.

=== Streynsham Master ===
Sir Streynsham Master, High Sheriff of Derbyshire, who bought the Codnor Castle estate in 1692, is reported as the last resident of the castle. He lived there until his death in 1724.

== Access and media coverage ==
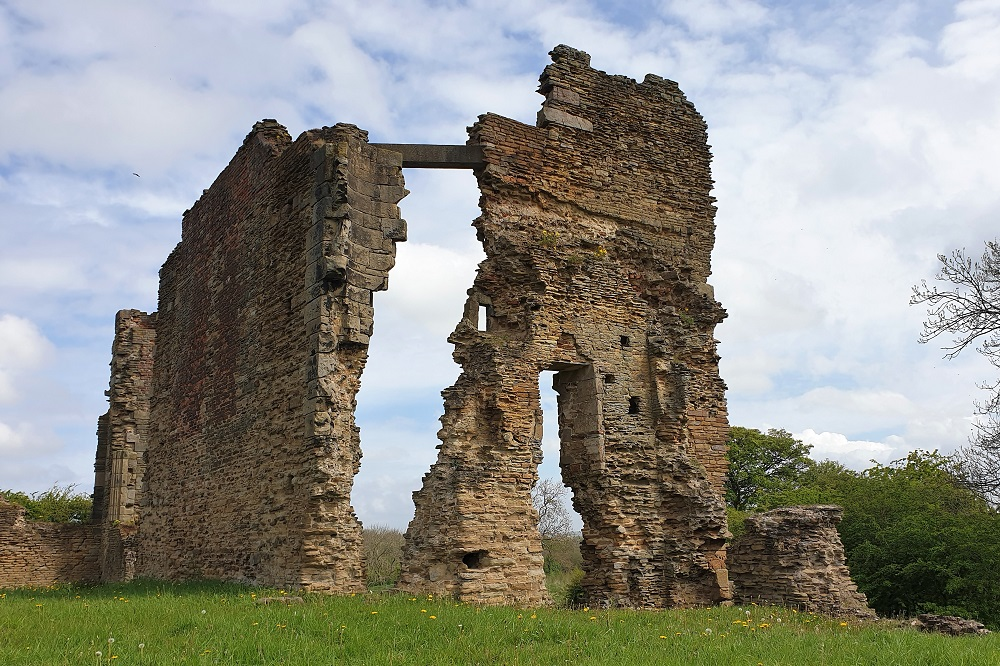
View from south with modern reinforcement beam

The castle site is not open for public access, though there are public footpaths across the upper field near the old keep (the North Court). The area around the farmhouse and farmyard is private property.

There are public footpaths to the Castle from Codnor Market Place, where there is an information board in partnership with Derbyshire County Council, as well as public footpaths from the east in the Erewash valley.

In June 2007, Channel 4's Time Team programme carried out an archaeological dig around the castle. A perfectly preserved gold noble of Henry V was found in the moat and is now displayed at Derby Museum and Art Gallery.

Most Haunted Live! visited the castle as part of a paranormal investigation 'As Live' special in 2017. The programme was broadcast in March 2018.

== See also ==
- Castles in Great Britain and Ireland
- List of castles in England
- Listed buildings in Aldercar and Langley Mill
