= Joseph Millott Severn =

Joseph Millot Severn
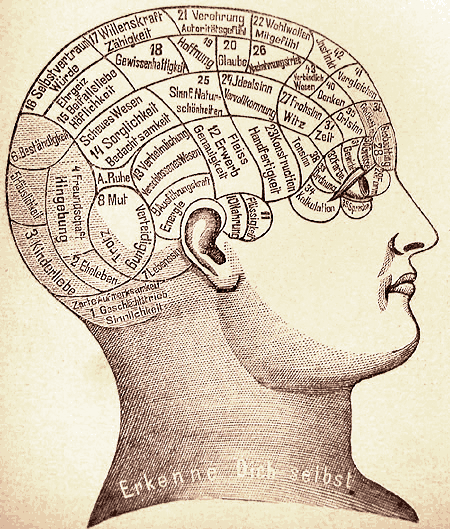
- Born: 1860; Codnor
- Died: 1942 (aged 81–82); Brighton
- Occupation: Phrenologist
- Writing career
- Period: 1912-
- Subjects: Phrenology, History

Joseph Millot Severn (1860-1942) was an English writer, historian, and phrenologist born in Codnor, Derbyshire.

== Biography ==
Severn was born in 1860 and worked as a phrenologist in Brighton (at 20 Middle Street). He was President of the British Phrenological Association. This association started in the 1880s and was disbanded in 1967. Severn wrote a number of books and funded some almhouses in his home village of Codnor.

Severn died at his home in Brighton in 1942.

== Major works (incomplete) ==
- My village: Owd Codnor, Derbyshire, and the village folk when I was a boy (1935)
- Phrenology: Up to date (1912)
- Popular phrenology (1913)
- Phrenological and physiological chart (1905) [Brighton Phrenological Institution]
- Joseph Severn: Letters And Memoirs (Nineteenth Century Series) - by Joseph Severn, Grant F. Scott, Ashgate Publishing (2005)
