= Listed buildings in Codnor =

Codnor is a civil parish in the Amber Valley district of Derbyshire, England. The parish contains three listed buildings that are recorded in the National Heritage List for England. All the listed buildings are designated at Grade II, the lowest of the three grades, which is applied to "buildings of national importance and special interest". The parish contains the village of Codnor, the hamlet of Cross Hill, and the surrounding area. The listed buildings consist of a house, a farmhouse, and a church.

== Buildings ==
Name and location	Photograph	Date	Notes
37 Nottingham Road; 53.04072°N 1.37287°W	—	1649	The house is in sandstone, with quoins, and a tile roof with coped gables. There are two storeys and attics, the windows on the front are casements, one with a re-used dated and initialled lintel. In the gable end is a mullioned window with a hood mould, and on the apex of the west gable is a square sundial with faces on two sides, and a ball finial.
Home Farmhouse; 53.04461°N 1.37414°W	—	1708	The farmhouse is in sandstone, with quoins, continuous hood moulds in both floors, an eaves band, and a tile roof with coped gables and moulded kneelers. The central doorway has a quoined surround and an initialled and dated lintel. The windows on the front are casement windows, and in the attic and at the rear are mullioned windows.
St James' Church; 53.03437°N 1.37715°W		1843–44	The chancel was added in 1888–90, and the church is built in sandstone with slate roofs and crested roof tiles. It consists of a nave, a chancel with a north vestry and parish room, and a west tower. The tower has three stages, angle stepped buttresses rising to pinnacles, a south doorway above which is a lancet window, a bell stage with a corbel table, an eaves string course, and an embattled parapet. The windows along the nave are lancets, with stepped buttresses between the bays.
