= Listed buildings in Car Colston =

Car Colston is a civil parish in the Rushcliffe district of Nottinghamshire, England. The parish contains 14 listed buildings that are recorded in the National Heritage List for England. Of these, one is listed at Grade I, the highest of the three grades, and the others are at Grade II, the lowest grade. The parish contains the village of Car Colston and the surrounding countryside. Most of the listed buildings are houses and associated structures, and the others include a church, headstones in the churchyard, and a whipping post.

== Key ==
Grade	Criteria
I	Buildings of exceptional interest, sometimes considered to be internationally important
II	Buildings of national importance and special interest

== Buildings ==
Name and location	Photograph	Date	Notes	Grade
St Mary's Church; 52.97988°N 0.92787°W		13th century	The church has been altered and extended through the centuries, it was restored in 1882 by James Fowler, and the tower was restored in 1911. The church is built in stone with tile roofs, and consists of a nave with a clerestory, north and south aisles, a south porch, a higher chancel, and a west tower. The tower has two stages, buttresses, a moulded plinth, a string course, coved eaves with gargoyles, an embattled parapet with eight pinnacles, and a squat recessed octagonal spire with a crocketed finial and a weathervane. In the lower stage are lancet windows and a clock face, and the upper stage contains bell openings with double lancets and transoms.	I
Manor Cottages; 52.97458°N 0.93361°W		Early 17th century	A manor house that was later extended and subsequently converted into two cottages. The earlier part is timber framed with brick nogging, partly encased in brick, and the later parts are in brick. The cottages are on a stone plinth, with dentilled eaves, and have tile roofs with a coped gable and kneelers. There are two storeys and attics, and nine unequal bays. The windows are a mix of casements and horizontally-sliding sashes, and there is a lean-to porch with a pantile roof.	II
The Old Hall; 52.98117°N 0.92548°W		Mid 17th century	A country house in stuccoed brick on a chamfered rendered plinth. The main block has a hipped slate roof, three storeys and three bays. The central doorway has a fanlight, a cornice and a hood, and the windows are sashes. To the left is a two-storey two-bay service wing with a slate roof, and at the rear is a wing with two storeys and an attic, and a tile roof. On the rear wing is a canted bay window, and the other windows in both wings are a mix of casements and sashes.	II
Walls and shed, The Old Hall; 52.98095°N 0.92590°W		Mid 17th century	The walls enclose the garden, and form a boundary to the grounds, and are in brick with stone dressings. The garden wall has a C-shaped plan, buttresses, a plinth, a dentilled cornice, and tapered brick coping, and the boundary wall has ramped half-round brick and ashlar coping. The adjoining garden shed, in an angle, has a single storey, a single bay and a pantile roof.	II
White Gates; 52.97667°N 0.92854°W		Mid 17th century	A farmhouse, later a private house, it was extended in the 18th century, and a rear wing was added in about 1935. The original part has retained some timber framing, and the rest is in brick and stone. The house is on a plinth, and has the remains of a belt course, the eaves are partly dentilled, and the roof is in tile and pantile with two coped gables, one with kneelers. There are two storeys and six bays, and a lean-to on the northwest. The windows are casements, some with mullions. The west gable has a porch with an arched doorway and a bay window, and at the rear is a two-storey stair turret.	II
Brunsell Hall and outbuildings 52.98212°N 0.91981°W		1662	A manor house that was largely demolished in 1759. It is in brick with quoins, cogged and dentilled eaves, and a gabled and hipped tile roof. There are two storeys, an L-shaped plan, and four bays. The windows are casements, many of them mullioned, and there is a doorway with moulded jambs.	II
Beech Close and outbuildings 52.97854°N 0.92748°W		1718	A country house, later Colston House, it is in brick on a chamfered stone plinth, with rusticated quoins, a moulded floor band, moulded eaves, and a tile roof with coped gables and kneelers. There are two storeys and attics, a double depth and L-shaped plan, and a front range of six bays. On the west front is a doorway with a keystone and a shell hood. To its right is a two-storey canted bay window, most of the windows are sashes with keystones, and in the roof are four dormers with hipped roofs. On the south front is a two-storey bow window with a parapet, and a corbelled panel with a coat of arms, initials and a date. At the rear is a round-headed stair window with Gothick tracery, and a porch with Doric columns. To the right are later outbuildings with two storeys and three bays and a pantile roof.	II
Wall and gates, Beech Close; 52.97845°N 0.92779°W		Early 18th century	The boundary wall is in stone and brick, and has ramped coping in brick, moulded brick and stone slab, and it extends for about 110 metres (360 ft). The main gate dates from 1908, and has a pair of square brick piers with pyramidal caps and ball finials, between which is a pair of scrolled wrought iron gates. To the right are four square brick piers with stepped caps.	II
Group of three headstones, St Mary's Church; 52.97973°N 0.92781°W	—	1739	The headstones in the churchyard are dated 1739, 1740 and 1763, and are in Leicestershire slate. The left headstone has a shouldered arched top and incised scrolls, the middle one is square-headed and has scrollwork and foliate border, and the right headstone has a stepped arched head and scrollwork.	II
Martin's Cottage; 52.97957°N 0.92863°W		Late 18th century	The house was raised and extended in the late 19th century. It is in stone and brick on a plinth, with quoins and pantile roofs. The extension is in brick and has dentilled eaves. There are two storeys, the main block has four bays, and the extension is lower with a single bay. The windows are a mix of casements, and sashes, some of which are horizontally-sliding, and some have segmental heads.	II
Shackerdale Farmhouse and wash house 52.98888°N 0.92796°W		c. 1800	The farmhouse is in brick on a plinth, with cogged eaves, and a pantile roof with coped gables. There are three storeys and an L-shaped plan, with a front of three bays and a continuous rear outshut. On the front is a lean-to timber porch with a tile roof, and a doorway with a segmental head and a fanlight, and the windows are casements. The adjoining wash house has dentilled eaves, a door with a segmental head and a casement window.	II
Whipping Post; 52.97859°N 0.92794°W		Early 19th century	The whipping post consists of a chamfered square oak post with a rounded leaded top. On the post are two pairs of iron manacles.	II
Water pump, Brunsell Hall; 52.98205°N 0.91994°W	—	1834	The pump is in a wooden case with a stepped top. It is in lead, and has a shouldered arched top cistern with a mask and figures, initials and the date, and the handle is in iron. In front is a round-angled stone trough on brick piers.	II
The Hall; 52.97788°N 0.93461°W		1838	A country house in Tudor Revival style, in brick on a plinth, with stone dressings, quoins, floor bands, a string course, and patterned tile roofs with coped gables and kneelers. There are two storeys and attics, three bays, and an irregular plan. The bays are gabled, the middle bay projecting slightly and wider, with a coped parapet and containing a canted bay window. The other windows are cross mullioned casements. Recessed on the right is a two-storey service wing, and at the rear are two wings and lean-to outbuildings.	II
