= G. & F. Cope =

British clockmakers from 1845 to 1984

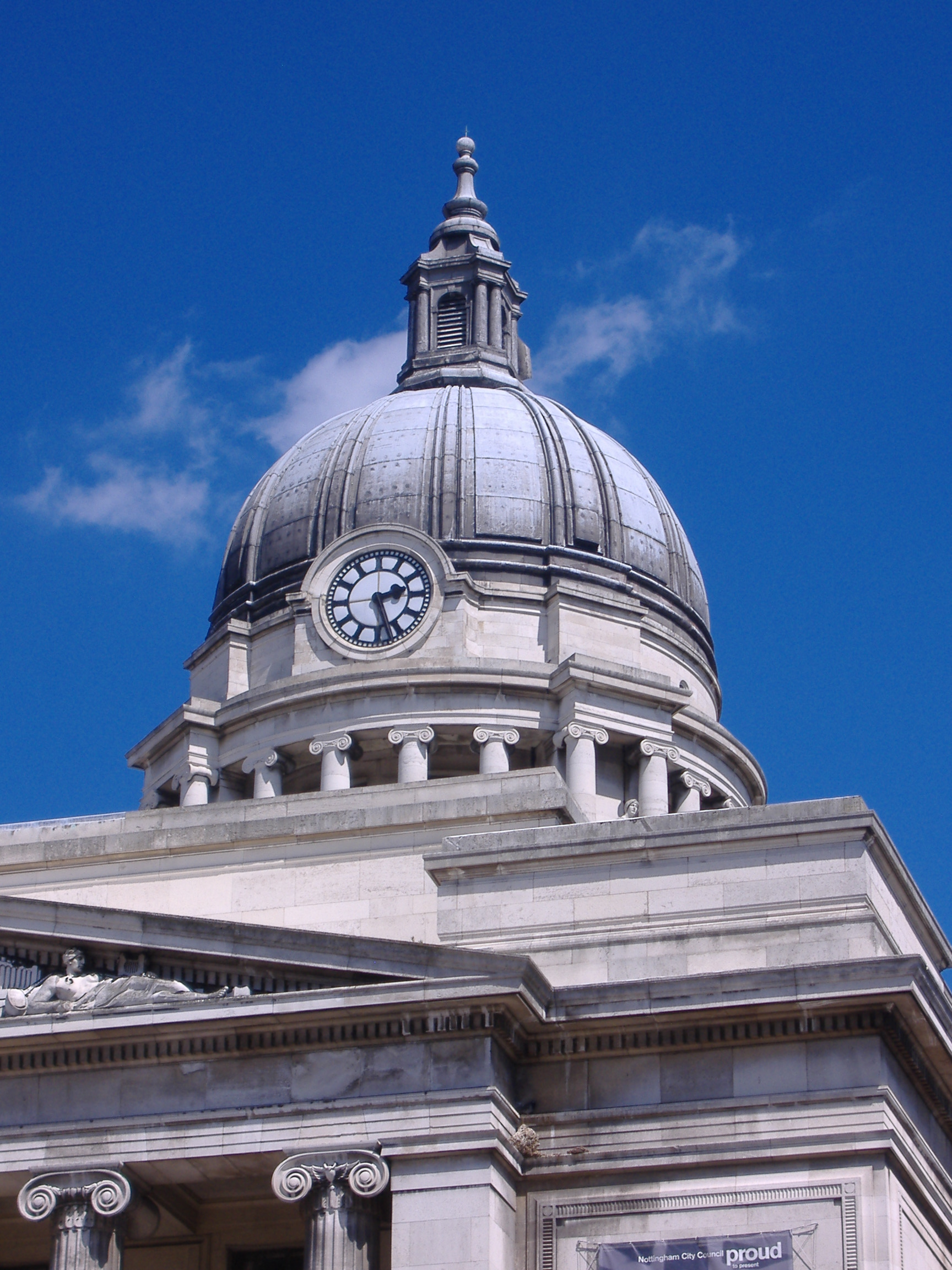
The most famous G. & F. Cope clock on Nottingham Council House

G. & F. Cope Ltd (previously W. & G. Cope) was a clockmaking company based in Nottingham, England from 1855 to 1984.

== W & G Cope ==
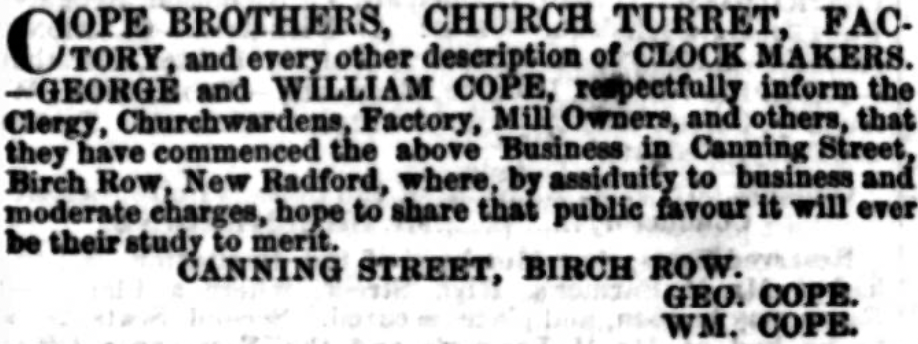
An advertisement from the Nottingham Journal 23 October 1857

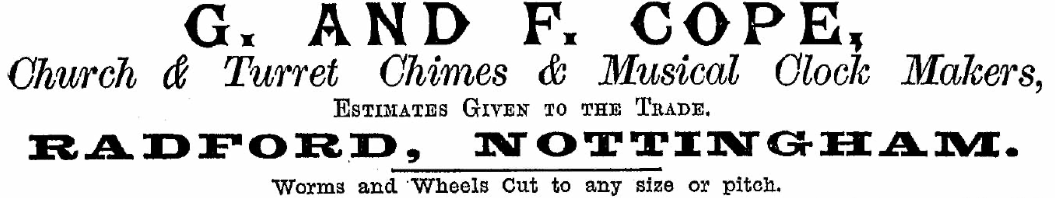
G & F Cope advertisement from the Post Office Directory for Nottingham 1876

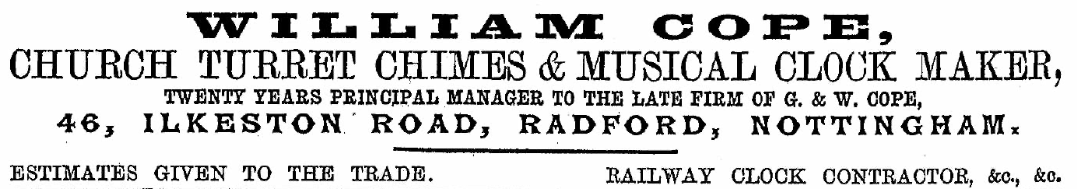
William Cope advertisement from the Post Office Directory for Nottingham 1876

William Cope (1835-1893) and George Cope (1829-1891), both brothers, founded the company in 1855. The business was based in Canning Street, Birch Row, Radford, Nottingham.

In 1860 the business moved from Spaniel Row to Hounds Gate where the company erected a steam engine and planing machinery.

The partnership between William and George Cope was dissolved in 20 August 1875 and the business carried on by George. George appears to have started a partnership with another brother, Francis Frederick Cope (1845-1901), shortly afterwards as G & F Cope was advertising by 1876.

William Cope then continued in business separately until his death in 1893.

== G & F Cope ==
In early 1879, the company took over the business of Reuben Bosworth of Nottingham.

The brothers were later joined by a nephew, William Cope (1867 - 1922), from Dewsbury, Yorkshire, the son of Alfred Cope (1840-1903), brother to George and Francis. He had been educated at High Pavement school and in 1881 was indentured to his uncles at the wage of 3 shillings per week (equivalent to £19 in 2023). This increased to 10 shillings (equivalent to £70 in 2023) in his 7th and final year.

Nephew William became owner of the business in 1899. He introduced electric motors to replace steam power in the business and was one of the first businessmen in Nottingham to install a telephone in his office.

In July 1922 William Cope died suddenly, leaving his 20-year-old son, William Waller Cope (1902-1985), who had barely finished his clock-maker’s training, in complete and sole charge of the business. His two sons Richard Cope and William David Cope followed him into the business.

The company was responsible for most of the public clocks in Nottingham, and also many further afield. As innovative manufacturers, the firm produced chronometers for the Admiralty as well as fine tower clocks and chimes.

Initially their factory was in Holden Street and they had offices on Gregory Street then Alfreton Road but in 1937 they moved to Portland Road. In 1945 they moved again to Prospect Place in Lenton, where the company remained until it was absorbed by Smith of Derby Group.

== Owners ==
- George and William Cope 1855 - 1875
- George and Francis Cope 1877 – 1899
- William Cope 1899 – 1922
- William Waller Cope 1922 –
- Richard Cope and David Cope

== Notable Cope Clocks ==
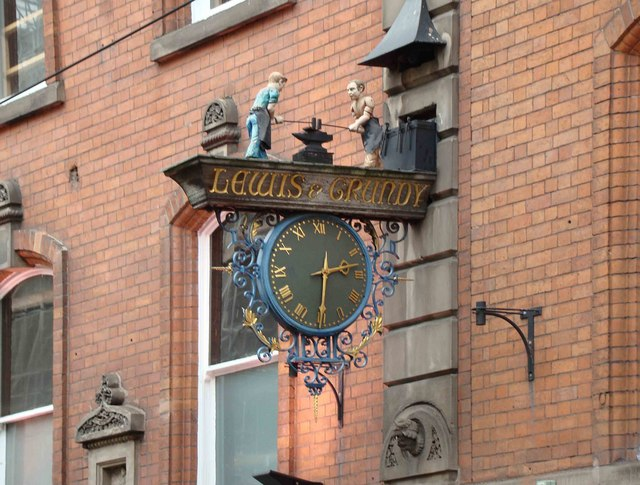
Lewis and Grundy Clock dating from 1950

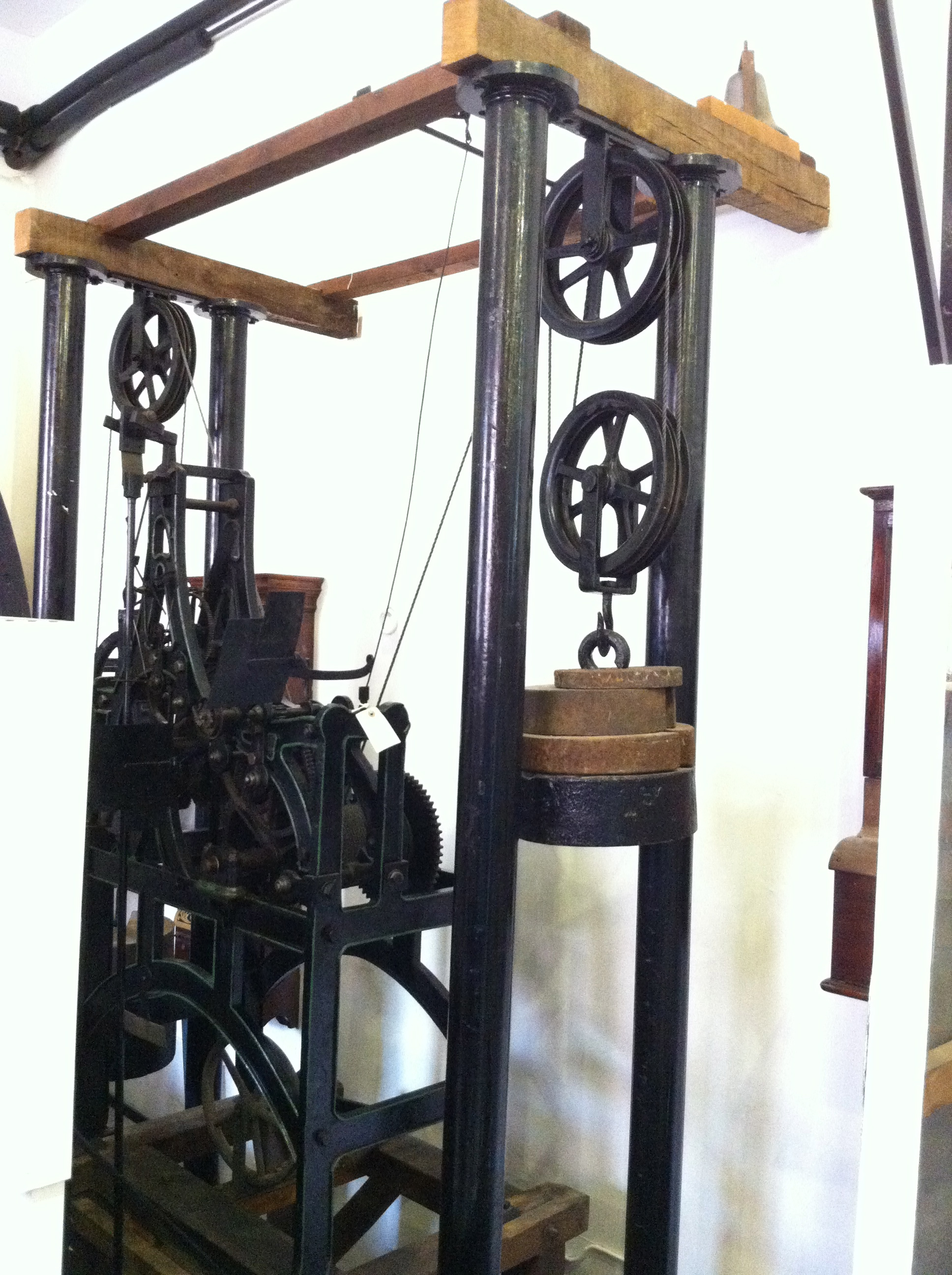
Clock by Cope built for the General Cemetery, now in Nottingham Industrial Museum

- Church of St Edmund, Mansfield Woodhouse 1859
- Church of the Holy Rood, Ossington 1864
- St Mary's Church, Ilkeston 1864
- All Saints' Church, Cotgrave, 1865
- Holy Cross Church, Epperstone 1865
- St Michael's Church, Laxton 1865
- St Mary's Church, Eastwood 1866
- Trent College, Long Eaton 1868
- Christ Church, Stannington 1869
- St Mary’s Church, Bridgewater 1869
- Church of St. Mary and All Saints, Bingham 1871
- St. Peter and St. Paul's Church, Shelford 1880
- Nottingham Exchange 1881, moved to St Helen's Church, Trowell in 1927
- St Peter's Church, Nottingham 1881
- Church of St Mary Magdalene, Hucknall 1884
- St Andrew's Church, Eakring, 1887
- St Mary's Church, Car Colston 1888
- St Peter's Church, Ruddington 1888
- St Mary's Church, Plumtree 1889 (removed in 2009)
- St. Andrew's Church, Langar
- Church of St Mary Magdalene, Keyworth 1893
- St Mary's Church, Bunny 1897
- St John's Church, Baston, Lincolnshire 1903
- St Peter's Church, Redmile, Leicestershire 1907
- All Hallows' Church, Ordsall 1908
- St. Wilfrid's Church, Kirkby-in-Ashfield 1911
- St Andrew's Church, Langley Mill 1912
- All Saints' Church, Mattersey 1921
- All Saints' Church, Rempstone 1920s
- St Luke's Church, Shireoaks
- Nottingham Council House 1926 (the loudest clock bell in the United Kingdom)
- Lever House, Blackfriars, London
- St. Christopher's Church, Sneinton
- St Mary's Church, Nottingham 1936 (the first all electric winding and chiming clock produced by the company)
- Church of St Mary the Virgin and All Souls, Bulwell 1949
- Lewis and Grundy Clock, Victoria Street, Nottingham 1950
- Holy Trinity Church, Lenton 1950
- St. Laurence's Church, Norwell 1953

== Notes ==
1. Some sources state the company was founded in 1845. This seems unlikely as in 1845 George was 16 years old and William 10 years old. The 1851 census records George (age 21) being a watchmaker, and William (age 16) being an apprentice watchmaker, both living at 13 Birch Row.
