= St Mary's Church, Car Colston =

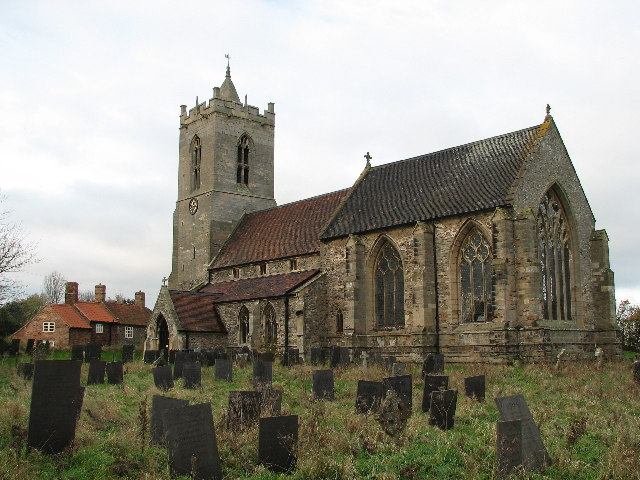
- St Mary's Church, Car Colston
- St Mary's Church, Car Colston
- 52°58′46.22″N 0°55′39.44″W
- OS grid reference: SK 72082 43037
- Location: Car Colston
- Country: England
- Denomination: Church of England

History
- Dedication: St Mary

Architecture
- Heritage designation: Grade I listed

Administration
- Diocese: Diocese of Southwell and Nottingham
- Archdeaconry: Newark
- Deanery: East Bingham
- Parish: Car Colston

St Mary's Church, Car Colston is a Grade I listed parish church in the Church of England in Car Colston.

== History ==
The church dates from the 13th century. The tower was restored in 1911.

The church is in a joint parish with St Wilfrid's Church, Screveton.

The church yard includes 3 headstones which are Grade II listed.

- That to left has shouldered arched top and incised scrolls, to Elenor Wollerton, 1762. Signed 'James Sparrow'.
- Central square headed stone has scrollwork and foliate borders. In the style of J. Sparrow. To John Woolerton, 1740.
- That to right has stepped arched head and scrollwork. To Thomas Woolerton, 1739. Signed 'J. Sparrow fecit'.

== Clock ==
The church obtained a clock built by Richard Roe (clockmaker) about 1678. This was replaced in 1888 to commemorate the Golden Jubilee of Queen Victoria with a new clock built by G. & F. Cope of Nottingham. The main wheels were 10 inches (0.25 m) in diameter, and it struck the hour on a bell of 18 long hundredweight (910 kg). The time was shown on two 2 feet (0.61 m) dials.

== Organ ==
A 2 manual and pedal 10 stop organ built by Wordsworth and Maskell about 1900..

== Memorials ==
Memorials include:

- Gregorius Henson, 1613
- Blagg family, 1876
- Robert Thoroton 1905, Brass signed 'Gawthorp Sc. London'
- Thomas Blagg, 1795
- Francis Blagg, 1814

== See also ==
- Grade I listed buildings in Nottinghamshire
- Listed buildings in Car Colston
