= Listed buildings in Screveton =

Screveton is a civil parish in the Rushcliffe district of Nottinghamshire, England. The parish contains nine listed buildings that are recorded in the National Heritage List for England. Of these, one is listed at Grade I, the highest of the three grades, and the others are at Grade II, the lowest grade. The parish contains the village of Screveton and the surrounding countryside. All the listed buildings are in the village, and consist of a church, items in and around the churchyard, a house, farmhouses and associated structures, and a pinfold.

== Key ==
Grade	Criteria
I	Buildings of exceptional interest, sometimes considered to be internationally important
II	Buildings of national importance and special interest

== Buildings ==
Name and location	Photograph	Date	Notes	Grade
St Wilfrid's Church; 52.98316°N 0.91587°W		13th century	The church has been altered and extended through the centuries, including restorations in 1881 and 184. It is built in stone with tile roofs, and consists of a nave, north and south aisles, a south porch, a chancel, a vestry and a west tower. The tower has three stages, diagonal buttresses, two string courses, an eaves band, and an embattled parapet with corner pinnacles.	I
The Old Priest's House; 52.98336°N 0.91532°W		Early 17th century	The house is timber framed with modern brick nogging, on a partial plinth, with a pantile roof. There is a single storey and attics, and a T-shaped plan, with a front of five bays and a rear wing. On the west front is a lean-to porch, the windows are casements, in the attic is a sloping dormer, at the rear is a lean-to bay window, and in the rear wing is a French window.	II
Top Farmhouse, service wing and walls 52.98596°N 0.91069°W	—	1702	The farmhouse is in brick and stone on a stone plinth, with floor bands, cogged and dentilled eaves, and pantile roofs with coped gables. There are two storeys and attics and an L-shaped plan, with fronts of five and two bays, and a double-gabled rear wing. On the front is a gabled wing on the left, with a lean-to porch in the angle containing a doorway with a segmental head. The windows are a mix of casements and horizontally-sliding sashes. The boundary walls are in brick with coping, and extend for 5 metres (16 ft).	II
Sundial, St Wilfrid's Church; 52.98304°N 0.91600°W	—	1732	The sundial in the churchyard is in stone and has a round plinth, and a round stem with a moulded base and capital. On the top is an inscribed and dated bronze dial.	II
Manor Farmhouse; 52.98634°N 0.90648°W	—	Mid 18th century	The farmhouse, which was later extended, is in brick on a plinth, with a floor band, cogged and dentilled eaves, and roofs of slate and pantile. There are two storeys and an L-shaped plan, with fronts of four and six bays. On the east front is a projecting bay containing a recessed doorway and a fanlight. The windows are a mix of sashes and casements.	II
Wall and stable, St Wilfrid's Church; 52.98309°N 0.91528°W	—	Mid 18th century	The wall enclosing the churchyard is in stone with gabled coping, it contains two gateways, one blocked, and extends for about 100 metres (330 ft). The adjoining stable is in brick with cogged eaves and a pantile roof with coped gables. There is a single storey and an L-shaped plan, with two bays, and it contains a doorway with a segmental head.	II
Water pump and trough, Top Farm; 52.98589°N 0.91070°W		1790	The water pump is in lead with a flat-topped wooden case, a ringed spout and a curved handle. On the cistern are initials and the date, and in front of the pump is a stone trough with a half-round end.	II
The Pinfold; 52.98634°N 0.91241°W		Mid 19th century	The pinfold is in brick, it has a circular wall with buttresses and plain coping, and is about 6 metres (20 ft) in diameter. It contains a timber gate with square piers.	II
Cartshed, pigeoncote, stables and wall, Top Farm; 52.98574°N 0.91020°W	—	Mid 19th century	The farm buildings are in brick with pantile roofs. They are in one and two storeys and have an L-shaped plan, with fronts of six and two bays. The cartshed has two bays and a central wooden post. To its right is a stable and pigeoncote with a floor band and two storeys, containing stable doors, sash windows, and pigeonholes with a bargeboarded hood. Adjoining is a larger stable containing doors with segmental heads, and diamond vents. The boundary wall is in brick and stone with concrete slab coping, it contains two square piers, and extends for about 30 metres (98 ft).	II
