= Bill Allcock =

English footballer

Personal information
- Full name: Clarence William Allcock
- Date of birth: 18 July 1907
- Place of birth: Codnor, England
- Date of death: 1971 (aged 63–64)
- Height: 5 ft 8 1/2 in (1.74 m)
- Position: Defender

Senior career*
Years	Team	Apps	(Gls)
- Grantham Town
1930–1935	Bradford Park Avenue	64	(0)
1935–1939	Barrow	130	(5)
Total		194	(5)
- * Club domestic league appearances and goals

Clarence William Allcock (born 18 July 1907) was an English footballer who played in the Football League as a defender for Bradford Park Avenue and Barrow. He was born in Codnor.
