= St Nicholas Church, Nottingham =

Church in Nottingham, England

Coordinates: 52°57′03″N 1°9′4″W

The Church of St Nicholas
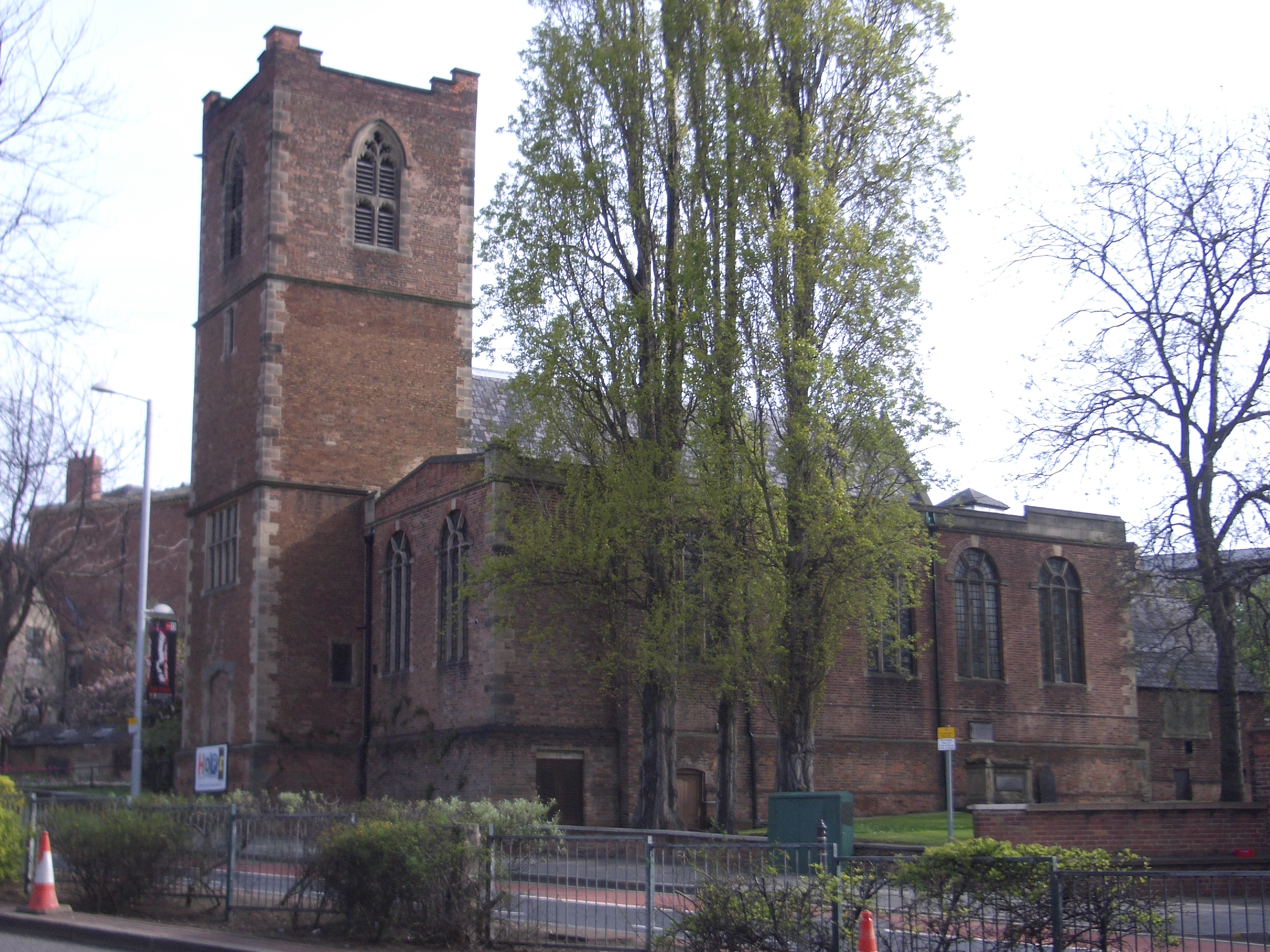
- St. Nicholas Church
- The Church of St Nicholas
- Denomination: Church of England
- Churchmanship: Charismatic Evangelical
- Website: stnics.org

History
- Dedication: St Nicholas

Administration
- Province: Province of York
- Diocese: Southwell and Nottingham

Clergy
- Rector: Steve Silvester

St Nicholas Church, known locally as St Nic's, is a parish church in Nottingham city centre under the Anglican diocese of Southwell. The church, since 1953, is Grade II* listed by the Department for Digital, Culture, Media and Sport as it is a particularly significant building of more than local interest.

== History ==
St Nicholas Church is one of the three medieval Christian foundations still existing in Nottingham, the others being St Peter's Church and St Mary's Church.

A church of St Nicholas was erected on the site of the present building in the eleventh or twelfth century. This building was destroyed in 1643 during the English Civil War. The Royalists established themselves in the tower of the old church, and bombarded the garrison of the Castle. In 1643 the governor of the castle, Colonel Hutchinson ordered the old church to be completely destroyed and for 28 years - from 1643 to 1671 - there was no Church of St. Nicholas in Nottingham. In 1671 a new church was being constructed with completion in 1678, the church which exists today.

The Marriage, Burial and Baptism Registers begin in 1562. Other documents deeds, indentures, ecclesiastical licences, terriers (or inventories of church property) - date from 1671. The Vestry Books contain accounts of elections and church meetings from 1703 onwards. No burials have taken place in the churchyard since 1881.

=== Present day ===
St Nicholas Church, also known as St Nic's, is a parish located in the city centre of Nottingham under the auspice of Southwell Diocese. Its congregation is drawn from across the city, and is popular with university students. It has been described by Anglican body Fulcrum as Charismatic and Evangelical.

== List of rectors ==
- 1259. William Bishop, died.
- 1267. Richard de Weremsworth.
- 1288. Johannes de Ludham.
- 1317. Herbertus Pouger.
- 1318. Willelmus de Ilkeston.
- 1321. Galfridus de Wilford, resigned for the church of Blackwell Lichfield diocese.
- 1329. Gilbertus de Ottrington.
- 1343. Thomas de Ottrington.
- ? Thomas Tuthill (or Futhill).
- 1351. Richardus Kaym de Gotham, died.
- 1366. Johannes Templer, died.
- 1366. Johannes Deinby, died.
- 1367. Thomas Lorday de Stanley, resigned for the church of Norton, Lincoln diocese.
- 1371. Willelmus de Bilham.
- ? Roger Bampton (or Mempton), died, buried in chancel.
- 1427. Willelmus Cokker, resigned.
- 1432. Willelmus Westhorpe.
- 1435. Johannes Sampson.
- 1436. Johannes Hopwell, died.
- 1464. Nicholas Fish, L.D., resigned.
- 1466. Richardus Elkesley, Doc.B., died.
- 1471. Robertus Echard, died.
- 1476. Thomas Tewe, resigned.
- 1477. Edmundus Holme.
- 1497. Johannes Dale, resigned.
- 1502. Thomas Reyner, resigned.
- 1503. Reynaldus Marshall, resigned.
- 1531. Alexander Penhill, Doc.B., died.
- 1533. Thomas Ward.
- 1585. Randulphus Shute, B.A., resigned for St Peter's Church, Nottingham.
- 1588. Johannes Lambe.
- 1611. Robertus Malham, M.A., died.
- 1622. Robertus Aynsworth,
- 1633. Johannes Aysthorpe.
- 1665—1669 vacant.
- 1669. Samuel Leek.
- 1672—1681 vacant.
- 1682. John Simpson.
- 1715. John Abson, M.A.
- 1749. George Wakefield, M.A.
- 1766. George Beaumont, resigned, buried in the chancel, 1773.
- 1773. Charles Wylde, M.A., D.D.
- 1835. William Joseph Butler, M.A.
- 1867. Henry Wright, M.A.
- 1872. George Ruthwen Thornton, resigned for the church of St. Barnabas', Kensington.
- 1876. William Pope, M.A., resigned for the church of Heanton Punchardon, Exeter diocese.
- 1905. John Bernard Barton, M.A., resigned for the church of Ronsdon, Exeter diocese.
- 1910. Philip Henry Douglas Ogle, M.A., resigned for the church of St. John, Stamford, Lincoln diocese.
- 1916. William Henry Milner, L.Th. died.
- 1920. John James West, M.A., died.
- 1929. Sidney Metcalfe,M.A.(Camb.), B.D. (Dunelm).
- 1947. Peter Montgomery Duplock, M.A.
- 1952. Thomas Anscombe, M.A.
- 1957. Sidney John Hill, M.B.E.
- 1964. Peter Bertram Coombs, M.A.
- 1968. Gilbert Bernard Gauntlett, M.A.
- 1973. David John Huggett, B.Sc. Ph.D.
- 1993. David John Betts, B.Sc.
- 1999. Trevor Hatton, B.A.
- 2008. Steve Silvester, M.A.

== Organ ==
The first organ was installed in 1811 and listed in the church inventory among other items, "one organ with rods and curtains, two bassoons and a serpent."

In 2010 the former organ by C. Lloyd and Co. was replaced by an electronic organ from Rodgers.

=== Organists ===
- Miss Stretton 1811 -
- Miss Dodd c. 1818
- Miss Woolley c. 1825
- William Richardson c. 1837 - 1867 (died 23 April 1867; buried 25 April 1867 at St Nicholas; lived on Angel Row)
- Henry Bond 1867 - 1871 (blind; formerly organist of St. James' Church, Standard Hill)
- William Locke until 1876
- Miss E.M. Spurr c.1878 - 1889
- Walter Seymour 1891 - 1908
- Joseph S. Selby FRCO ca. 1913
- Sydney J. Burdett 1919 - 1928 (afterwards organist of Old Radford Church)
- James Ronald Hatchett (formerly organist of St Wilfrid's Church, Wilford)
- Raymond Dudley Hodson Smith ca. 1931 - c.1941
- Mr. H Kelly ca. 1947
- Arthur Smedley 1965 - 1977 (formerly organist at St Mary's Church, Bunny, afterwards organist at St Peter's Church, Ruddington)
- John Churchill 1986 - 2017
- Megan Atwell 2019 -

== Clock ==
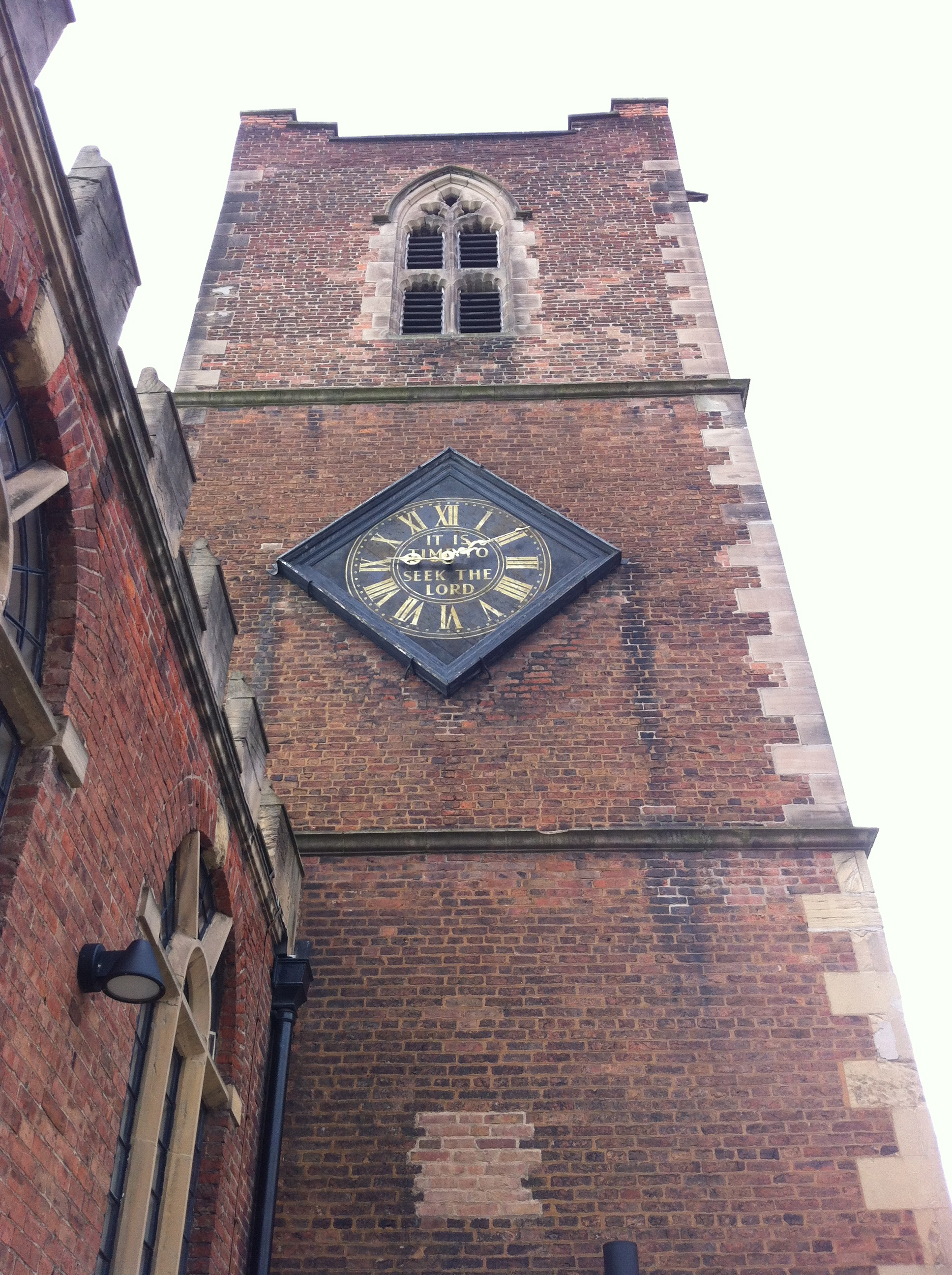
The clock installed in 1830, but thought to be the face of the clock by James Woolley of 1726 from the Nottingham Exchange

An early clock was installed in 1699 by Richard Roe. This was replaced in 1830 by a clock by James Woolley which had previously been in the Nottingham Exchange. The diagonal clock face is thought to have been installed at the same time, and also been from the Exchange. This 1830 clock mechanism was replaced by an electric action clock in the 1970s but the clock face was retained. The James Woolley clock was given to the Nottingham Industrial Museum.

== See also ==
- Grade II* listed buildings in Nottinghamshire
- Listed buildings in Nottingham (Bridge ward)

== Sources ==
- Alfred Stapleton, 1905, Churches and Monasteries of Old and New Nottingham
- Keith Train, 1981, Train on Churches; Nottingham
- J Holland Walker M.B.E., F.S.A., F.R.Hist.S, c1930, St. Nicholas' Church Nottingham
