= Codnor =

Village and civil parish in Derbyshire, England

Coordinates: 53.0430°N 1.3730°W

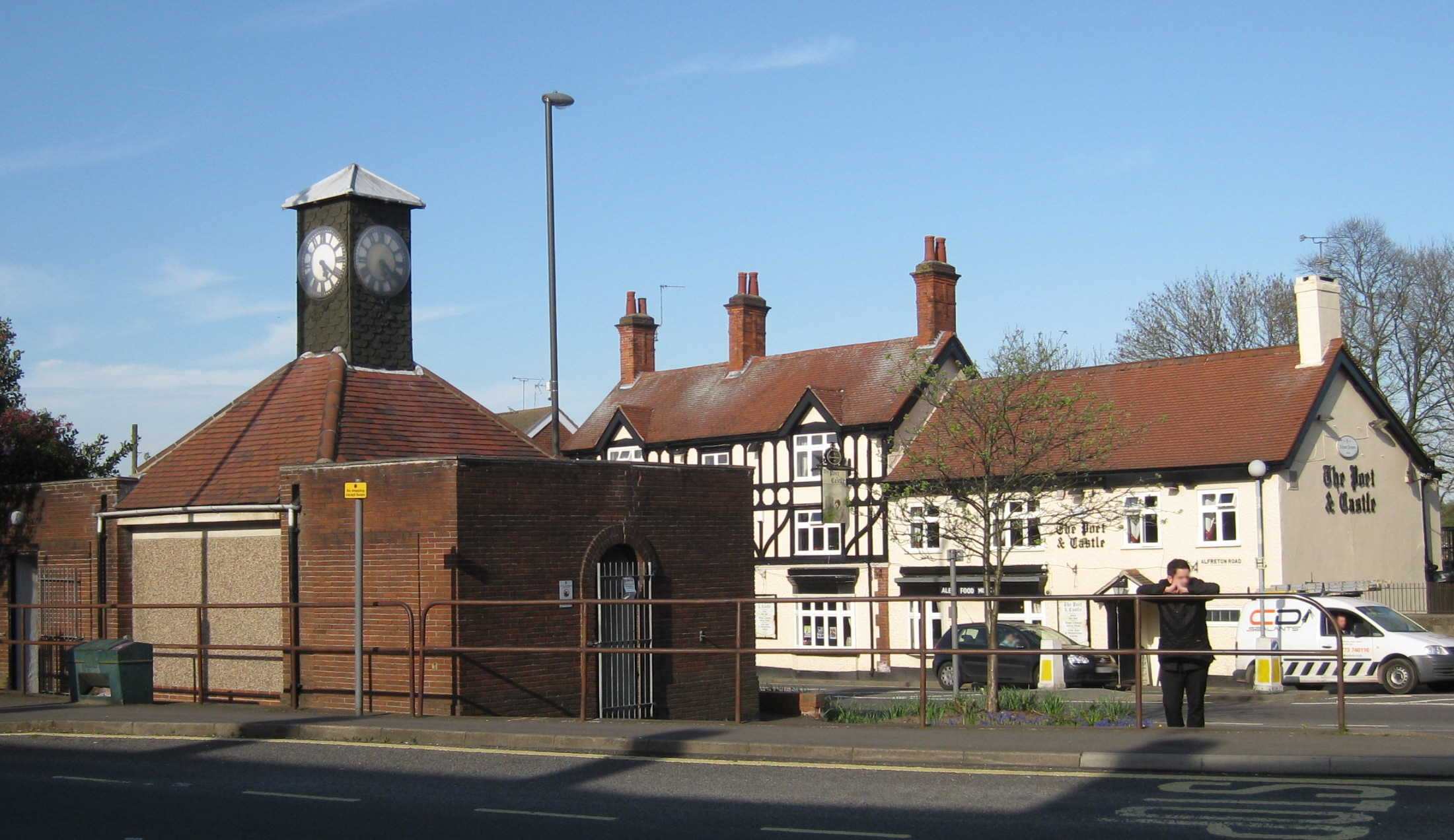
- Codnor High Street: Codnor Clock and Poet & Castle pub.

- Location within Derbyshire
- Population: 3,766 (2011)
- OS grid reference: SK43364998
- District: Amber Valley
- Shire county: Derbyshire
- Region: East Midlands
- Country: England
- Sovereign state: United Kingdom
- Post town: Ripley
- Postcode district: DE5
- Dialling code: 01773
- Police: Derbyshire
- Fire: Derbyshire
- Ambulance: East Midlands
- UK Parliament: Amber Valley

Codnor is a village and civil parish in the Amber Valley district of Derbyshire, England. Codnor is a former mining village. The parish had a population of 3,766 at the 2011 census. It is approximately 12 miles (19 km) from Derby and 14 miles (23 km) from Nottingham. Codnor forms a built up area with Ripley.

== History ==
Codnor is listed in an entry in the Domesday Book of 1086, the great survey commissioned by William the Conqueror; a mill and church were mentioned, and also the fact that "Warner holds it". Coalmining had a long history locally, and was, at one time, responsible for subsidence damage to some buildings. Opencast mining is still in operation today within the area and the land around the castle has also been subject to this.

1 mile (1.6 km) east of the village centre is Codnor Castle; the original Norman earthwork motte and bailey was built by William Peveril (Peveril of the Peak, who also built the better known Peveril Castle at Castleton). The 13th-century stone structure which replaced it is now in ruins. The castle was formerly held by the powerful de Grey family. The castle overlooks the valley of the little River Erewash, which forms the county boundary between Derbyshire and Nottinghamshire, and the now defunct section of the Cromford Canal. The castle was the subject of an investigation by archaeological television programme Time Team - first aired on 6 January 2008 - which discovered many new facts about the structure, as well as unearthing a solid gold coin, a 'noble' of Henry V.

At one time the village had a railway station, Crosshill and Codnor, which was operated as part of the Midland Railway. The branch line was torn up when colliery traffic waned, and the only signs of it that are now left are a converted station yard and some embankments.

Codnor had three Methodist chapels, all in the Ripley Circuit, as well as the Anglican church of St James, at Crosshill. The village was also the birthplace of the noted Victorian phrenologist 'Professor' Joseph Millott Severn, who authored the book My Village: Owd Codnor and funded a set of almshouses in the centre of the village, which still stand to this day.

In recent years Codnor has had traffic problems, because the A610 (the main road to/from Nottingham) goes through the village, carrying traffic to Ripley, and further places such as Matlock. Codnor also used to be served by trams; the 'Ripley Rattler' (so-called), used to travel between that town and Nottingham. These were quite notorious, and were even the subject of a short story, "Tickets Please", by local writer D. H. Lawrence (born 4 miles away, in Eastwood). The standards, which had carried the electric power lines for the trams, and the later trolley buses, were not removed until the early 1960s.

== Geography ==
Codnor is close to the larger communities of Ripley and Heanor.

To the south, the village includes the neighbourhood of Crosshill.

== Sport ==
Codnor has its own golf club, Ormonde Fields.

Codnor has a cricket club which has been in existence since 1924. Whilst having some difficult times in the early stages of the club, the club now plays at a competitive standard in the Derbyshire county league and fields both a 1st and 2nd eleven as well as two youth teams. The club currently play on Goose Lane, which used to be home to Codnor Miners Welfare before it was shut down in 2007.

Codnor also has three football teams. There is Codnor FC, who play in the Derby City Football League; Codnor Athletic FC who play in the Alfreton QTS League; and Codnor Miners FC, who play in the East Midlands Senior League

== Red, White and Blue Festival ==
The British National Party held its Red, White and Blue festival from 2007 to 2009 off Codnor-Denby Lane, to the south of Codnor. It was cancelled in 2010.

== Notable buildings ==
There are three structures in Codnor civil parish that are listed by Historic England for their historical or architectural interest. These are the Church of St James beside the A6007, Home Farmhouse on Alfreton Road, and No.37 Nottingham Road. These are all listed as grade II. Codnor Castle is also Grade II but is in the neighbouring parish of Aldercar and Langley Mill.

== Notable people ==
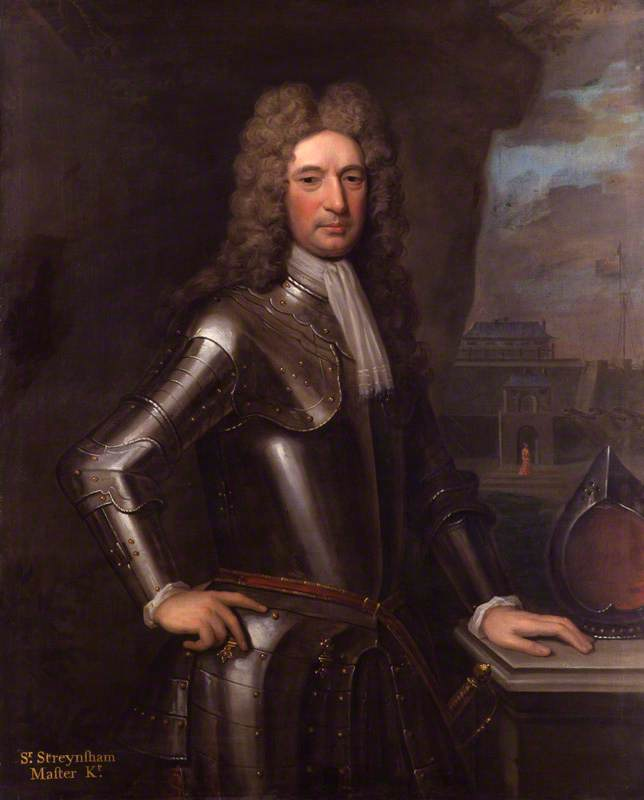
Streynsham Master, 1714

- Richard de Grey (died c.1271), landowner, held important positions during the reign of Henry III
- Sir Streynsham Master (1640–1724), a colonial administrator who bought Codnor Castle
- James Woolley (ca.1695 – 1786), a watch and clockmaker
- Joseph Millott Severn (1860-1942), writer, historian and phrenologist.
- Chanel Cresswell (born 1990), actress, played Kelly Jenkins in the film This Is England (2006), grew up here.

=== Sport ===
- Arnold Warren (1875–1951), cricketer who played 255 first-class cricket games for Derbyshire and one Test cricket match
- John Poole (1892–1967), footballer who played 251 games including 144 for Sunderland
- Bill Allcock (1907-1971), footballer who played 194 matches including 130 for Barrow
- James Hunt (born 1976), footballer, who played 474 games including 174 for Northampton Town

== Geography ==
North West Ripley, Butterley	North: Golden Valley, Riddings, Somercotes	North East: Ironville, Jacksdale
West: Waingroves, Ripley	Codnor	East: Codnor Castle, Stoneyford, Brinsley
South West: Denby, Kilburn	South: Loscoe, Heanor	South East: Langley Mill, Eastwood

== See also ==
- Listed buildings in Codnor
