= All Saints' Church, Strelley =

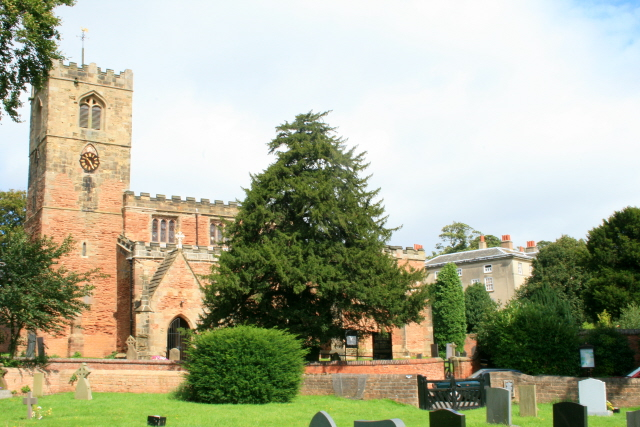
- All Saints' Church, Strelley
- All Saints' Church, Strelley
- 52°58′26.89″N 1°14′48.27″W
- OS grid reference: SK 50650 42090
- Location: Strelley, Nottinghamshire
- Country: England
- Denomination: Church of England

History
- Dedication: All Saints'

Architecture
- Heritage designation: Grade I listed

Administration
- Province: York
- Diocese: Diocese of Southwell and Nottingham
- Archdeaconry: Nottingham
- Deanery: Nottingham North
- Parish: Strelley

Clergy
- Rector: Amanda Jane Cartwright

All Saints' Church, Strelley is a Grade I listed parish church in the Church of England in Strelley, Nottinghamshire.

== History ==
The church dates from the 13th century. It was rebuilt from 1356 by Samson de Strelley. The clerestory was added in the 15th century. It was restored between 1855 and 1856 by George Gordon Place and in 1895 by Charles Hodgson Fowler.

The clock in the tower was installed in 1868 and built by Reuben Bosworth.

== Parish status ==
This church is in a combined parish which comprises:

- St John the Baptist's Church, Bilborough
- St Martin of Tours’ Church, Bilborough

== Memorials ==
The church is noted for its monuments which include:

- Alabaster chest tomb to Sir Samson de Strelley and his wife, ca. 1400
- Floor slab to John de Strelley, 1421
- Brass to Sir Robert Strelley and his wife Isabel, 1487.
- Alabaster chest tomb to John de Strelley, and his wife Sanchia, 1501.
- Sir Nicholas de Strelley, 1560
- Ralph Edge, 1684
- William Taylor, 1696
- Valentine Taylor, 1696
- William Taylor, 1699
- William Goodday, Rector, 1788, and his wife Ruth, 1766

== See also ==
- Grade I listed buildings in Nottinghamshire
- Listed buildings in Strelley Village
