= Listed buildings in Strelley Village =

Strelley was a civil parish in the Borough of Broxtowe, Nottinghamshire, England until 2023. The former parish area contains eight listed buildings that are recorded in the National Heritage List for England. Of these, one is listed at Grade I, the highest of the three grades, and the others are at Grade II, the lowest grade. It contained the village of Strelley and the surrounding area, and the listed buildings consist of a church, a country house and associated structures, a house and its stable range, and a war memorial.

== Key ==
Grade	Criteria
I	Buildings of exceptional interest, sometimes considered to be internationally important
II	Buildings of national importance and special interest

== Buildings ==
Name and location	Photograph	Date	Notes	Grade
All Saints' Church; 52.97382°N 1.24720°W		13th century	The church has been altered and extended through the centuries, the chancel was built in the late 14th century, the church was restored in 1855–56, and further alterations were carried out in the 1880s and 1890s, possibly by C. Hodgson Fowler. The church is built in stone with lead roofs, and consists of a nave with a clerestory, north and south aisles, a south porch, north and south transepts, a chancel and a west tower. The tower has three stages, central buttresses, two string courses, lancet windows, a clock face, two-light bell openings, an embattled parapet, and a pyramidal roof with a weathercock. There are also embattled parapets on the body of the church. The chancel is large and contain rich furnishings and monuments.	I
Golder Close and wall 52.97144°N 1.24121°W		Mid 18th century	A house that was later extended, in red brick on a chamfered plinth, with painted stone dressings, dentilled eaves and a slate roof. There are three storeys, an L-shaped plan with later additions, and a main range of three bays. Steps lead up to the central doorway that has a moulded surround and a pediment on brackets, and the windows on the front are tripartite sashes with rusticated lintels and double keystones. On the west front is a single-storey three bay extension, and a single-storey service wing; these contain a mix of sash and casement windows. Enclosing the rear yard is a brick wall 3 metres (9.8 ft) high, and the boundary wall has gabled coping and buttresses, and extends for about 75 metres (246 ft) along the road and garden.	II
Strelley Hall; 52.97415°N 1.24642°W		1789–92	A country house incorporating part of an earlier house, and later used for other purposes, it is in rendered brick on a plinth, with stone dressings, floor bands, deep moulded eaves and pediments, plain parapets, and Westmorland slate roofs. There are three storeys and fronts of five and seven bays. The middle three bays of the south front project under a pediment. The middle bay of the east front projects under a pediment, and contains a pedimented square porch with pilasters, and a doorway with Doric columns and a fanlight, flanked by round-headed niches with keystones. Most of the windows are sashes, and there is a square bay window. The service wing has two storeys and five bays, it contains mullioned casement windows and sashes, and has a doorway with a chamfered rusticated surround, a fanlight and a keystone. To the north are service buildings arranged around a courtyard.	II
Ice house, Strelley Hall; 52.97386°N 1.24390°W	—	c. 1790	The ice house in the grounds of Strelley Hall is in brick. A pair of curved boundary walls leads to a partly collapsed tunnel entrance. The chamber is egg-shaped and domed, and is about 4 metres (13 ft) in diameter.	II
Kitchen garden walls, Strelley Hall; 52.97660°N 1.24749°W	—	c. 1790	The walls enclosing the kitchen garden are in brick with flat slab coping, and have a square plan, with sides of about 100 metres (330 ft). Some walls contain chimney pots, on the east side is a doorway with a segmental head, and on the north side are lean-to sheds with doorways and casement windows. The walls form part of Strelley Lodge.	II
Stables, cottage and gate lodge, Strelley Hall; 52.97399°N 1.24736°W		c. 1790	The building, which incorporates earlier material, is in brick and stone, on a stone plinth, with a floor band, dentilled eaves, pediments, and roofs of tile and slate. It is in two and three storeys, with an L-shaped plan, and has a main range of seven bays. The stable openings have round and segmental heads. The cottage has two storeys and two bays, a double-depth plan and horizontally-sliding sash and casement windows. The gate lodge has coped gables and an H-shaped plan.	II
Stables, Golder Close; 52.97155°N 1.24077°W		Early 19th century	The stable block is in brick with a tile roof, two storeys and an L-shaped plan. Most of the openings are blocked, and include doors, including carriage doors, former casement windows, hatches and vents. To the right is a lower carriage house with a stable door and a pair of carriage doors.	II
War memorial 52.97336°N 1.24749°W		c. 1920	The war memorial is in the extended churchyard of All Saints' Church, and was designed by Cecil Greenwood Hare. It is in sandstone, and consists of a calvary under a canopy, on a square moulded pedestal on a base of three circular steps. On the pedestal are recessed limestone tablets, with inscriptions and the names and details of those lost in the First World War.	II
