= James Woolley (clockmaker) =

British clockmaker

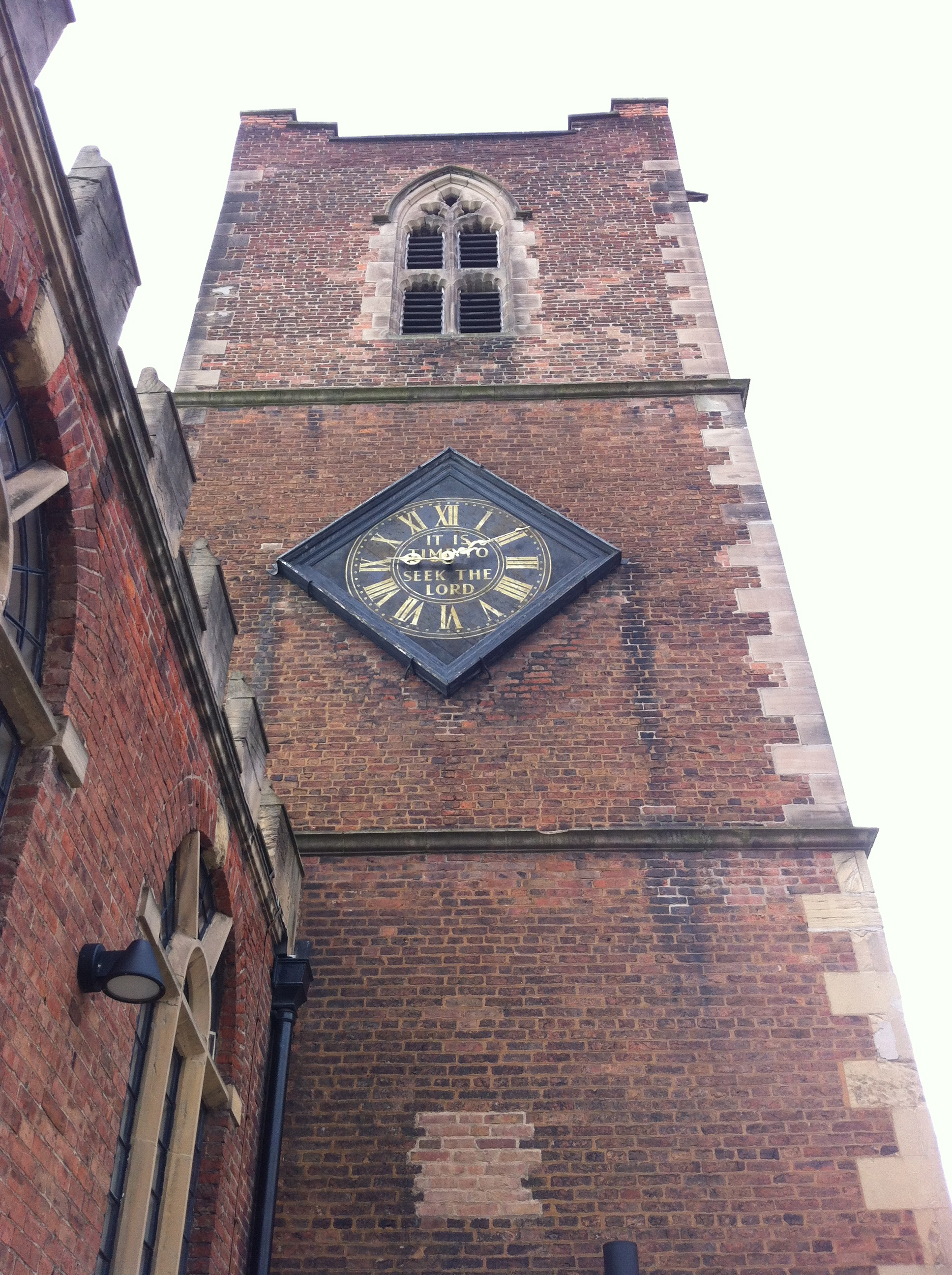
The clock on St Nicholas' Church, Nottingham installed in 1830, but thought to be the face of the clock by James Woolley of 1726 from the Nottingham Exchange

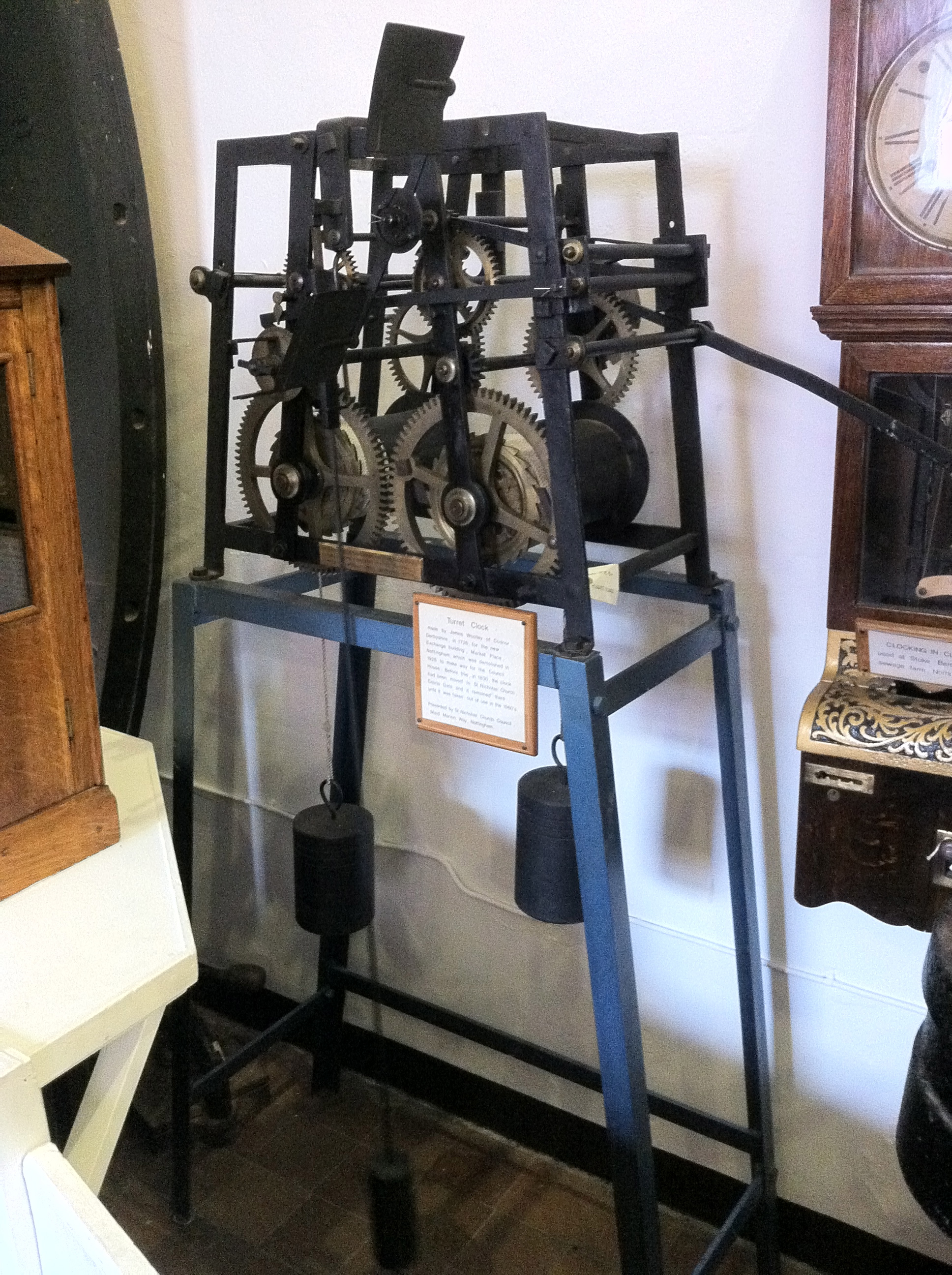
Clock mechanism formerly in the Nottingham Exchange and then St Nicholas' Church, Nottingham, now in Nottingham Industrial Museum

James Woolley or James Wolley (ca.1695 – 22 November 1786) was a watch and clockmaker from Codnor, Derbyshire.

== Life ==
He was born ca 1695, the son of Samuel Woolley and Abigail Pinegar.

He made turret clocks, one of which was installed in the Nottingham Exchange, which he gifted to the Nottingham Corporation, and in return he was made an honorary burgess of Nottingham. He also made longcase clocks known to be signed "J Woolley", brass and silvered face with moon dial c.1780's.

He died at his house on Codnor Common on 22 November 1786, a bachelor, and left his fortune to his two nephews.

He signed his clocks "Wolley". Therefore this article should list his name as James Wolley or James Woolley.

== Works ==
Public clocks include:

- Nottingham Exchange 1726, moved to St Nicholas' Church, Nottingham 1830. Now in the Nottingham Industrial Museum.
