= Strelley Village =

Village in Nottinghamshire, England

Coordinates: 52.972°N 1.245°W

Strelley
- Village
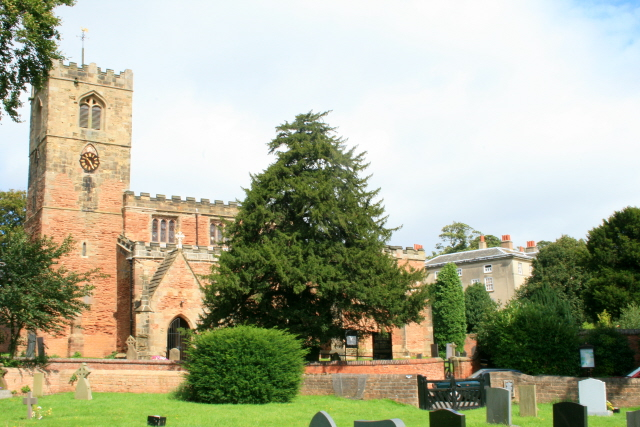
- All Saints' Church

- Location within Nottinghamshire
- Interactive map of Strelley
- Population: 496 (2021)
- OS grid reference: SK 50695 41928
  - London: 110 mi (180 km) SSE
- District: Borough of Broxtowe
- Shire county: Nottinghamshire
- Region: East Midlands
- Country: England
- Sovereign state: United Kingdom
- Post town: NOTTINGHAM
- Postcode district: NG8
- Dialling code: 0115
- Police: Nottinghamshire
- Fire: Nottinghamshire
- Ambulance: East Midlands
- UK Parliament: Broxtowe

Strelley is a village and former civil parish in the Borough of Broxtowe and City of Nottingham in Nottinghamshire, England. It is to the west of Nottingham. The population of the civil parish taken at the 2011 census was 653, and 496 at the 2021 census. It is also the name of the nearby post war council housing estate. The village lies mainly in the Broxtowe district with a small portion crossing over into the city administrative area, whilst the estate is fully contained in the city of Nottingham. The village is separated from the housing estate by the A6002 road.

== Village ==
The village of Strelley was first recorded in the Domesday Book in 1086, where it appears as Straleia. The name means 'clearing on a street or Roman road', though there is not known to be a Roman road in the area.

The village has quite a secluded atmosphere as it is not on a through-road for traffic, although bridleways ran from the village to Cossall to the west, and to Kimberley to the north. The old Broad Oak pub remains but has been partially modernised.

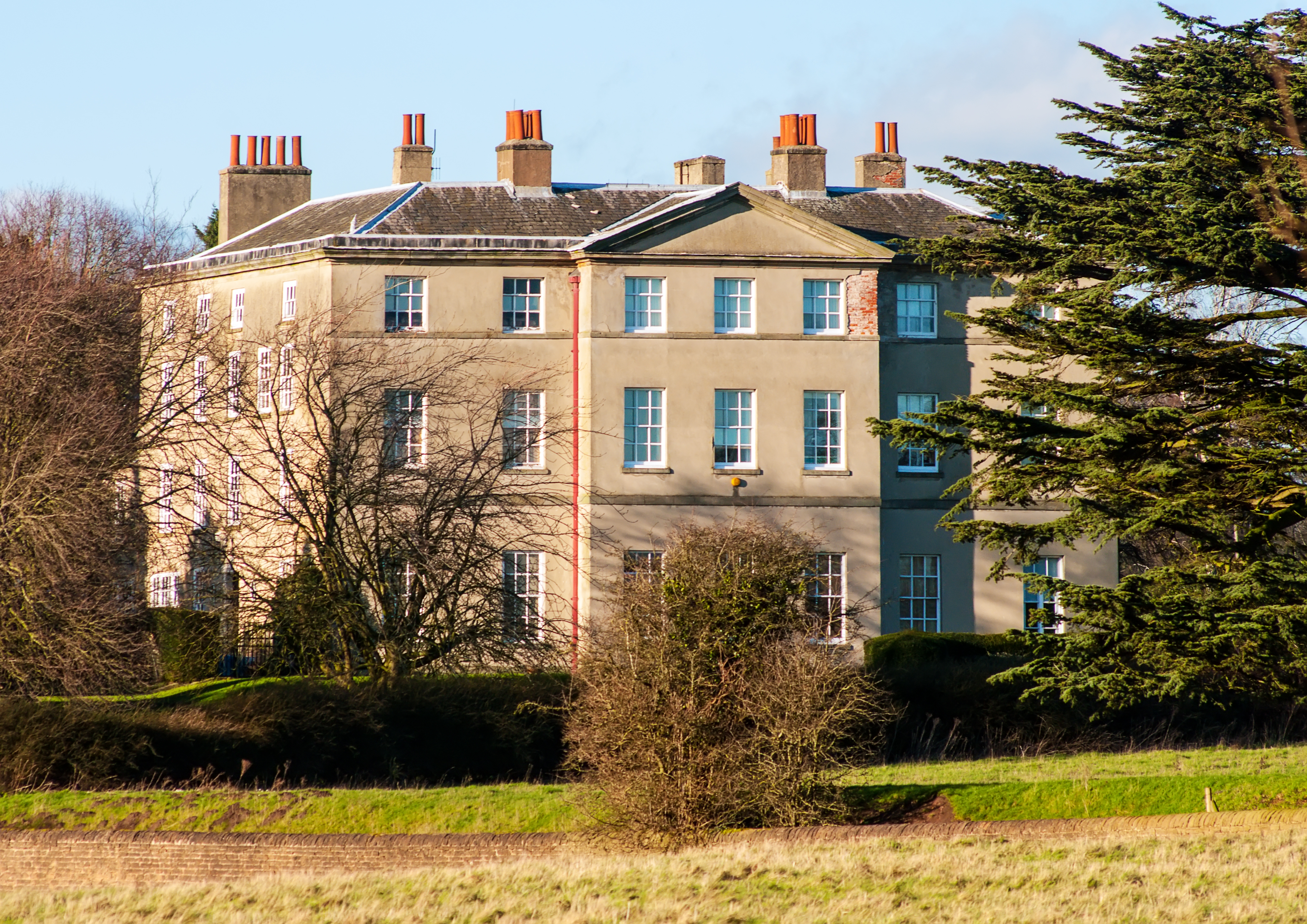
Strelley Hall

Strelley is also notable for being the upper terminus of one of the earliest recorded railway lines in the world, the Wollaton Waggonway. The railway ran to Wollaton. Horse-drawn coal wagons travelled to their destination on wooden railway lines. This type of railway is known as a wagonway and it was completed during 1604. It was built by Huntingdon Beaumont working in partnership with the second occupier of Wollaton Hall, Sir Percival Willoughby. Coal mining was a significant industry in Strelley during Elizabethan and Stuart times. Notable families involved in the early mining of Strelley included the Strelleys and the Byrons; it was a Byron who sub-leased the pits to Huntingdon Beaumont.

During the 1960s much of the western part of Strelley parish was dominated by a huge opencast coal mine. After the opencast mine closed, the M1 motorway was constructed over the west of the parish. The village church All Saints' Church, Strelley can now easily be seen from the motorway just north of the Trowell services area. The civil parish was abolished in April 2023, so presently the area is unparished.

== Geography ==
The main television transmitter for Nottingham is in the area, which takes signals from Waltham. The transmitter is also known as Swingate as it is east of Swingate Farm. The transmitter is next to the Kimberley parish boundary, and the Robin Hood Way. The transmitter base is at a height of around 130 metres, and near a trig point at Windmill Farm.

== See also ==
- Listed buildings in Strelley Village
