= Listed buildings in Aldercar and Langley Mill =

Aldercar and Langley Mill is a civil parish in the Amber Valley district of Derbyshire, England. The parish contains four listed buildings that are recorded in the National Heritage List for England. All the listed buildings are designated at Grade II, the lowest of the three grades, which is applied to "buildings of national importance and special interest". The parish contains the villages of Aldercar and Langley Mill and the surrounding area. The oldest building is Codnor Castle, which is listed, together with a nearby farmhouse and farm building. The other listed building in the parish is a church in Langley Mill.

== Buildings ==
Name and location	Photograph	Date	Notes
Remains of Codnor Castle; 53.04505°N 1.35487°W		13th century	The remains of the fortified manor house are in sandstone. The rectangular three-storey tower remains are about 18 feet (5.5 m) high, and there is a connecting wall to the outer court on the south. The outer court has walls on three sides, and in the centre is a polygonal tower with cross slit windows and a small ogee window. In the west wall is a fireplace with a four-centred arch, and a doorway with a quoined surround. The remains are also a scheduled monument.
Castle Farmhouse; 53.04469°N 1.35445°W		17th century	The farmhouse is adjacent to Codnor Castle, and is in stone and red brick, with stone dressings, quoins, and a tile roof. There are two storeys and a basement, and five bays. On the front are two doorways with chamfered surrounds, and the windows are mullioned, transomed, or mullioned and transomed.
Farm building south of Castle Farmhouse; 53.04439°N 1.35464°W	—	Late 18th century	The farm building consists of stables with a loft. It is in red brick with a tile roof and rendered gables, and has two storeys and four bays. The openings include two stable doors, windows, and slit vents, and on the west side external steps lead to an upper floor doorway.
St Andrew's Church, Langley Mill; 53.01807°N 1.33329°W		1911–12	The church is in stone with green slate roofs and stone ridge tiles. It consists of a nave, a south aisle, a north porch, north and south transepts, a chancel, and a tower at the crossing. The tower has diagonal buttresses, to the northeast is a circular stair tower with slit windows and a conical roof, on the north and south sides of the tower are semicircular windows and clock faces, and at the top is a stepped and panelled parapet.
