= St James' Church, Codnor =

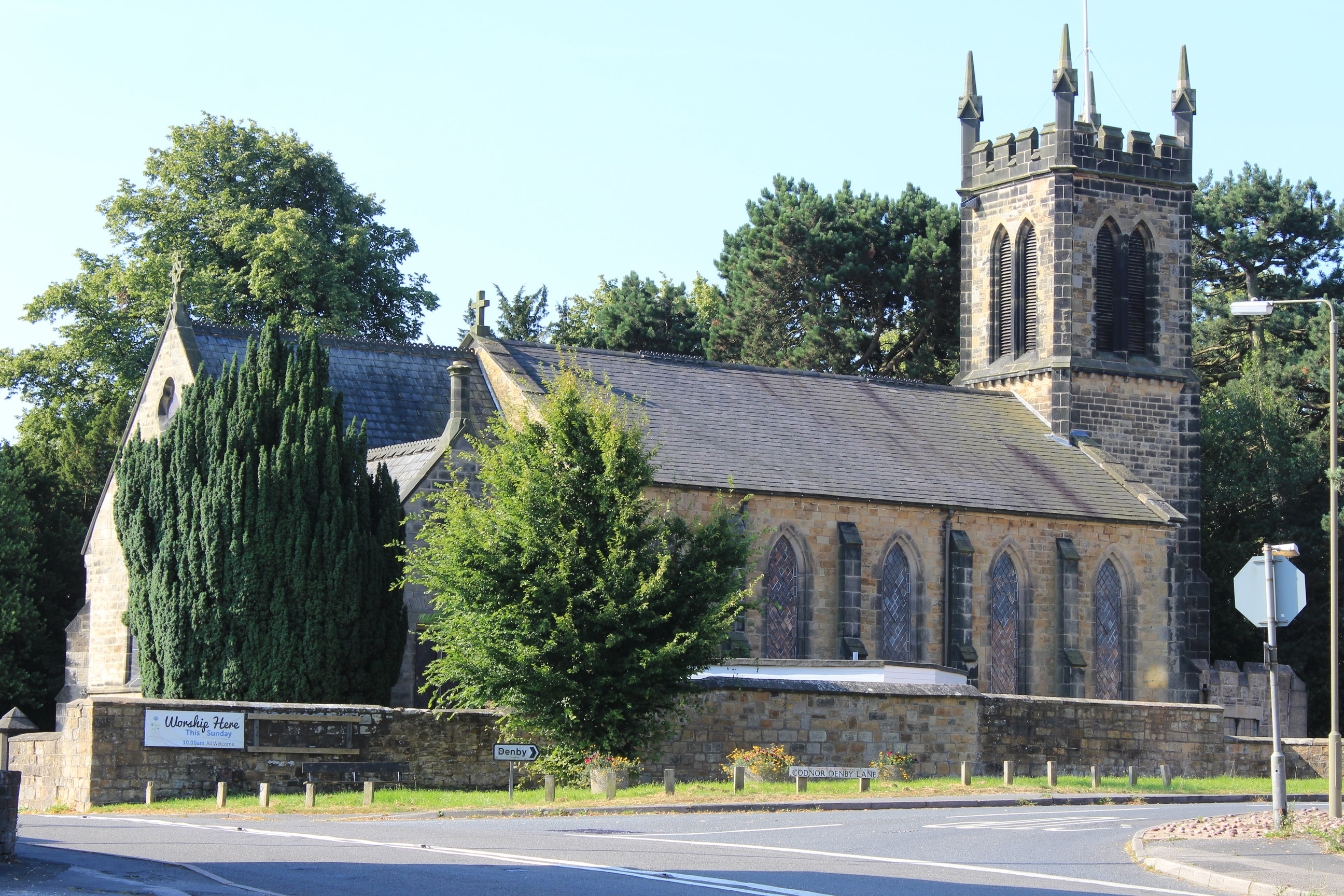
- St James' Church, Codnor

- Location within Derbyshire
- 53°02′0.29″N 1°22′40.19″W
- OS grid reference: SK 41861 48743
- Location: Codnor, Derbyshire
- Country: England
- Denomination: Church of England

History
- Dedication: St James
- Consecrated: 10 October 1844

Architecture
- Heritage designation: Grade II listed
- Architect: Robert Barker

Administration
- Diocese: Diocese of Derby
- Archdeaconry: Derby
- Deanery: Heanor
- Parish: Codnor

St James' Church, Codnor is a Church of England parish church in Codnor, Derbyshire.

== History ==
The church was built in 1844 to the designs of architect Robert Barker. It was consecrated on 10 October 1844.

The chancel was added in 1888–90 by J Holden.

== Organ ==
The original pipe organ was enlarged and improved in 1876 by Charles Lloyd of Nottingham, but it was given to St Andrew's Church, Langar in 1906. A replacement pipe organ by Abbott and Smith was installed in 1906. A specification of the organ can be found on the National Pipe Organ Register.

== See also ==
- Listed buildings in Codnor
