= Langley Mill =

Village and civil parish in Derbyshire, England

Coordinates: 53.018°N 1.338°W

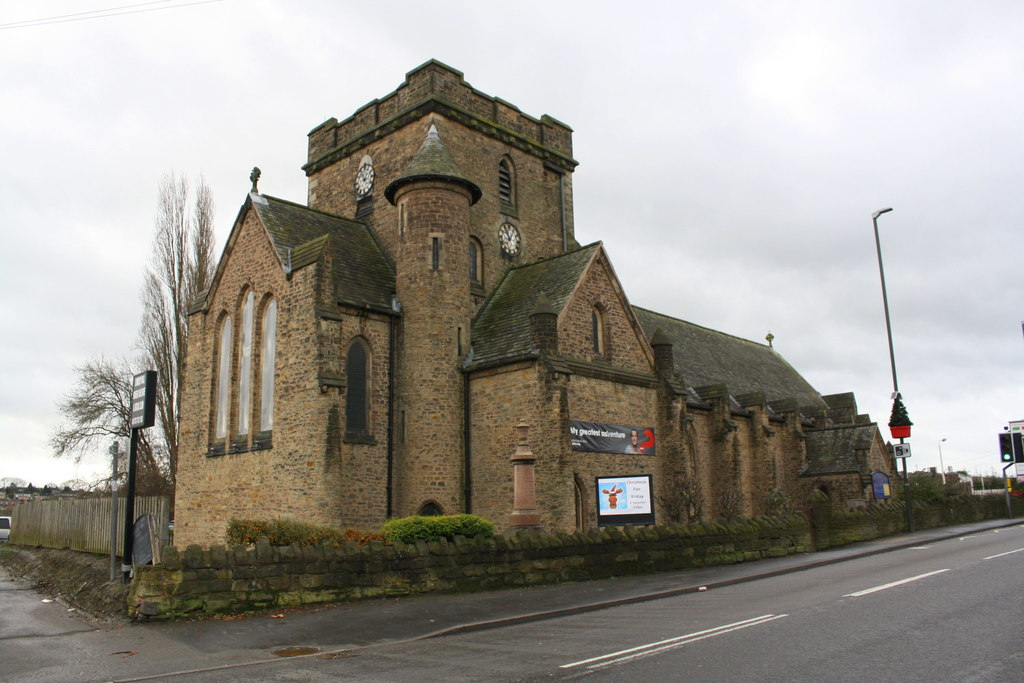
- St Andrew's Church, Langley Mill

- Location within Derbyshire
- Population: 5,805
- OS grid reference: SK 44404 46983
- Civil parish: Aldercar and Langley Mill
- District: Amber Valley
- Shire county: Derbyshire
- Region: East Midlands
- Country: England
- Sovereign state: United Kingdom
- Post town: NOTTINGHAM
- Postcode district: NG16
- Dialling code: 01773
- Police: Derbyshire
- Fire: Derbyshire
- Ambulance: East Midlands
- UK Parliament: Amber Valley

Langley Mill is a village in the civil parish of Aldercar and Langley Mill in the Amber Valley district of Derbyshire, England.

== History ==
Originally named Long Lea, the village of Langley Mill was a major employer throughout the mid 1900s with many companies including The Flour Mill, Langley Mill Pottery, Aristoc & Co Ltd, G. R. Turner Ltd., and Vic Hallam Limited.

Aristoc, originally on North Street, manufactured silk stockings within the village. During the Second World War, when its manufacturing included parachutes and inflatable dinghies for the war effort, it became a target for German bombers. The buildings have been replaced with housing.

The now closed Victory greyhound racing track was opened on ground adjoining the New Inn on 19 April 1930. As a flapping (independent) track it was not affiliated to the sports governing body, the National Greyhound Racing Club. The principal distances for greyhound racing was 330 and 500 yards; the track also held whippet races.

International superbike champion Ron Haslam came from Langley Mill. He won international motorcycle titles in the 1970s and early 1980s.

== Geography ==
Langley Mill is at the junction of the Erewash Canal, the Cromford Canal, and the Nottingham Canal.

The village, part of the Aldercar and Langley Mill parish, is near to the border of Nottinghamshire, and is conjoined to the village of Aldercar (to the north) and the town of Heanor (to the south-west). It is also conjoined with the neighbouring village of Langley in the Heanor and Loscoe parish. Across the River Erewash is the town of Eastwood in Nottinghamshire. The Erewash was the Aldercar and Langley Mill boundary; this moved in 1992 to the A610, the Erewash Canal basin becoming part of Langley Mill. Postal confusion, despite having an NG Postcode, the county of Derbyshire can be used for Langley Mill addresses as long as the correct Postcode is used.

== Transport ==
The village is served by a railway station on the Erewash Valley Line. It is also served by buses that connect it to Derby, Nottingham, Ilkeston, Long Eaton and Ripley among other destinations.

The village was at one point also served by another railway station on the former Ripley and Heanor Railway which offered the village connections to Heanor and Ripley as well as Ambergate, Buxton, Matlock and Manchester. The line closed in 1926 to passengers and later freight traffic. The site is now in use as a public park.

== See also ==
- List of places in Derbyshire
- Listed buildings in Aldercar and Langley Mill
