= St Wilfrid's Church, Screveton =

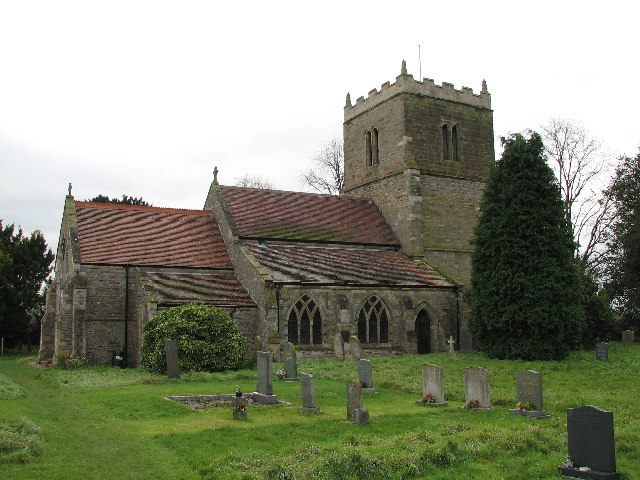
- St Wilfrid's Church, Screveton
- St Wilfrid's Church, Screveton
- 52°58′58.83″N 0°55′1.59″W
- OS grid reference: SK 72880 43414
- Location: Screveton
- Country: England
- Denomination: Church of England

History
- Dedication: St Wilfrid

Architecture
- Heritage designation: Grade I listed

Administration
- Diocese: Diocese of Southwell and Nottingham
- Archdeaconry: Newark
- Deanery: East Bingham
- Parish: Screveton

St Wilfrid's Church, Screveton is a Grade I listed parish church in the Church of England in Screveton.

== History ==
The church dates from the 13th century. The west tower, however, dates from the 15th century and was altered in the late 16th century. The chancel was restored in 1881, and the nave restored and vestry built in 1884. The alabaster tomb of one Richard Whalley bears carvings of his three consecutive wives and his 24 children.

The church forms a joint parish with St Mary's Church, Car Colston. They form two of the Fosse group of churches with St Peter's Church, East Bridgford, St Helen's Church, Kneeton, and the Church of St Augustine of Canterbury, Flintham. Some joint services are held with the East Bridgford Methodist Church.

== Memorials ==
- Richard Whalley, Tower chamber
- Walter Penistone Whalley, 1680
- Margaret Whalley, 1675
- Admiral Evelyn Sutton, 1817, and Roosilia Sutton, 1829.

== See also ==
- Grade I listed buildings in Nottinghamshire
- Listed buildings in Screveton
