= Aldercar =

Village in Derbyshire, England

Coordinates: 53.01°N 01.34°W

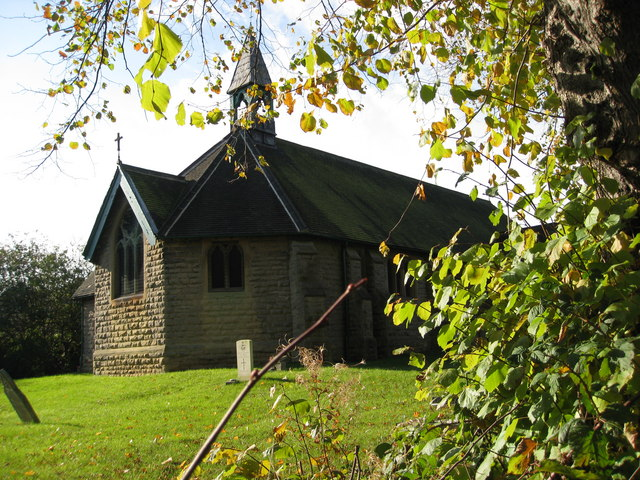
- St. John's church

- Location within Derbyshire
- OS grid reference: SK4447
- Civil parish: Aldercar and Langley Mill
- District: Amber Valley
- Shire county: Derbyshire
- Region: East Midlands
- Country: England
- Sovereign state: United Kingdom
- Post town: NOTTINGHAM
- Postcode district: NG16
- Dialling code: 01773
- Police: Derbyshire
- Fire: Derbyshire
- Ambulance: East Midlands

Aldercar is a village in Derbyshire, England. It is located near Langley Mill, close to the county boundary with Nottinghamshire, and forms part of the civil parish of Aldercar and Langley Mill. The area is commonly known in Amber Valley thanks to Aldercar High School, the local secondary school. The area is also home to Aldercar Hall down Aldercar lane, one of the first houses in the area.

== See also ==
- Listed buildings in Aldercar and Langley Mill
