= Nottingham Exchange =

Marketplace in Nottingham, England

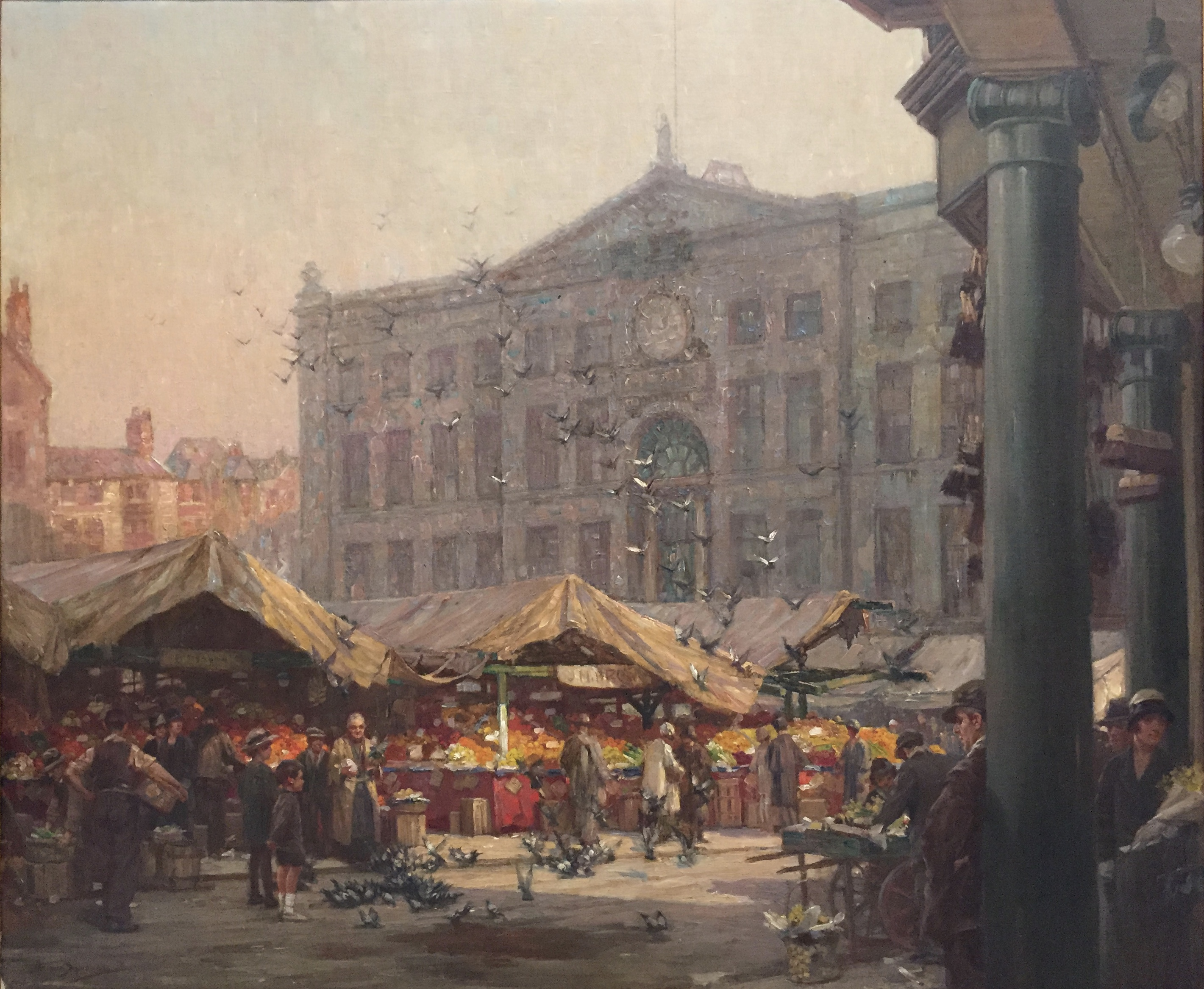
- The Exchange ca. 1920 by Arthur Spooner

- Location within Nottinghamshire

General information
- Location: Old Market Square, Nottingham, England
- Coordinates: 52.952162°N 1.147844°W
- Construction started: 1724
- Completed: 1726
- Demolished: 1926
- Cost: £2,400
- Client: Nottingham Corporation

Design and construction
- Architect: Marmaduke Pennell

Nottingham Exchange was built in the Market Place in Nottingham between 1724 and 1726 as the main offices of the Nottingham Corporation. It was demolished in 1926.

== History ==
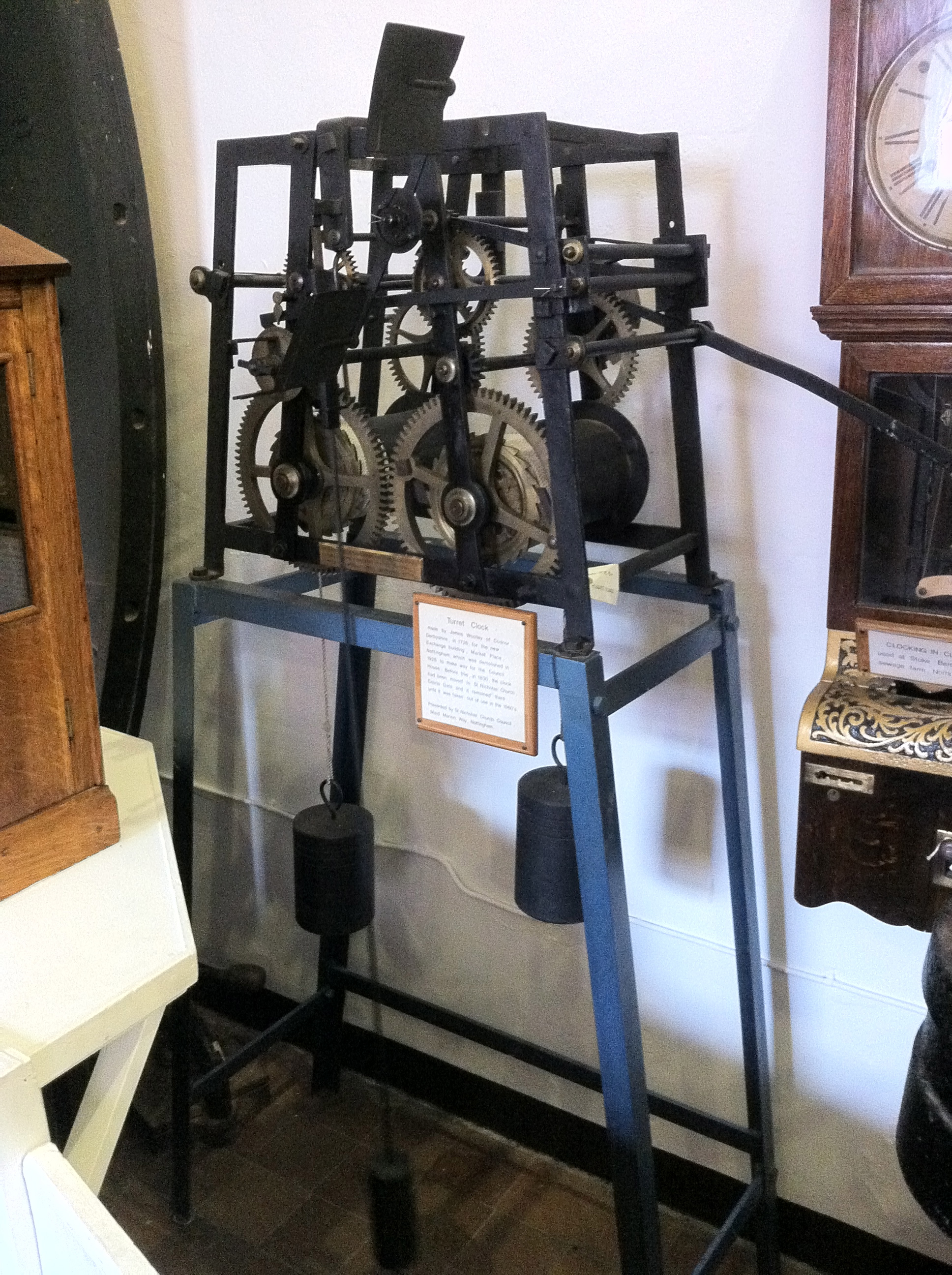
Clock by James Woolley of 1726, moved to St Nicholas' Church, Nottingham in 1830 and now in Nottingham Industrial Museum

The Nottingham Exchange was erected between 1724 and 1726 replacing a shambles of buildings on the same site. It cost £2,400 (£297,563 in 2015) and comprised a four-storey, eleven bay frontage 123 feet (37 m) long. The architect was the mayor, Marmaduke Pennell. The corporation offices moved here from Nottingham Guild Hall.

A clock was presented for the Exchange by 1728 by the famous clock builder James Woolley of Codnor, and in return he was made a Burgess of Nottingham.

The building was reconstructed between 1814 and 1815 at a cost of £14,000 (£780,225 in 2015). This moved the main staircase from the front to the side, and gave better access to the Great Hall which was 75 feet (23 m) by 30 feet (9.1 m). The Great Hall was used for concerts, elections, balls, meetings and exhibitions.

In 1830, John Whitehurst and Son of Derby provided a new clock for the Exchange at a cost of £100 (£7,149 in 2015). The old clock was acquired by St Nicholas' Church, Nottingham and later given to the Nottingham Industrial Museum.

On 19 September 1836 a new dial was added to the clock by Shepperley for £46 (£3,289 in 2015) and this was illuminated by a gas jet. On 26 November 1836 a fire broke out and considerable damage was caused to the building.

The Midland Railway adopted London Time at all of its stations on 1 January 1846. To avoid confusion, in February 1846 the town council ordered that the town clocks be furnished with three hands, two indicating local time and the additional one the railway and post-office London time.

A new clock was built in 1881 by G. & F. Cope and moved to St Helen's Church, Trowell in 1927.

The Exchange was demolished in 1926 to make way for the current Nottingham Council House which occupies the same site.

== Nottingham Time Ball ==
In 1876 a Greenwich time ball apparatus was fixed to the Smithy-row corner of the parapet of the Nottingham Exchange. It was installed by the Corporation to indicate Greenwich Mean Time to assist with the regulation of public clocks. Operated by electrical control, the ball dropped from top to bottom of a short staff at 1pm each day. It started operation on 11 September 1876.

It was removed in 1886. Its use was probably discontinued because the installation had lost both its novelty and usefulness through the more general availability of Greenwich time, and the greater accuracy of public clocks.
