= Aristoc =

British hosiery marketer and manufacturer

- Type: Stockings
- Industry: Lingerie
- Founded: 1924
- Headquarters: Belper, Derbyshire, England
- Products: Hosiery
- Website: Aristoc.com

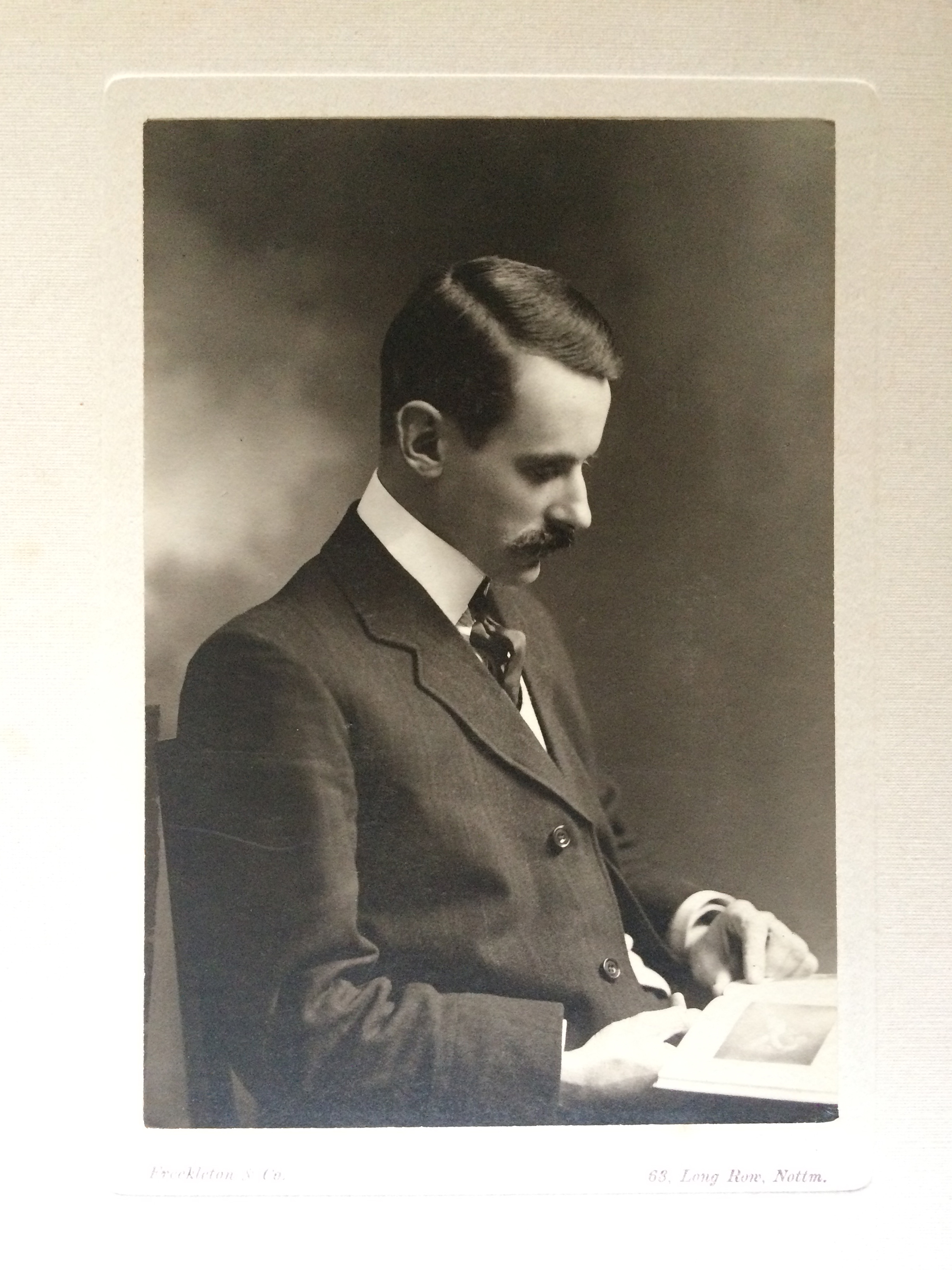
Albert Ernest Allen, founder of Aristoc

Aristoc, located in Belper in Derbyshire, was a British marketer and manufacturer of hosiery.

Aristoc was first registered as a trademark in 1924 by A.E. Allen and Co. Ltd; appearing in advertising for the company from 1926. In 1934 the company was renamed Aristoc. The company made most of its products in the Amber Valley in Derbyshire. The company went into liquidation and ceased trading on the 14th May 2026.

== About ==
Aristoc was a British hosiery brand. Albert Ernest Allen founded the company A. E. Allen and Co. Ltd. in 1919 which was renamed 'Aristoc' in 1934. Aristoc originally marketed itself as the "aristocrat of silk stockings". They were famous for their production of tights, knee-highs, stockings, shapewears, and body shapers. Aristoc was a brand under the company Pretty Polly. They were known to be reasonably priced so most can afford them. Aristoc is most commonly known for their body shapers. Aristoc was recorded to be one of the longest established hosiery brands in the United Kingdom. As of 2013, Aristoc stated that 90% of its manufacturing was based in Britain, at its Derbyshire facility, as part of its campaign to support traditional British manufacturing.
