= Aldercar and Langley Mill =

Civil parish in Derbyshire, England

Coordinates: 53.03677°N 1.3438°W

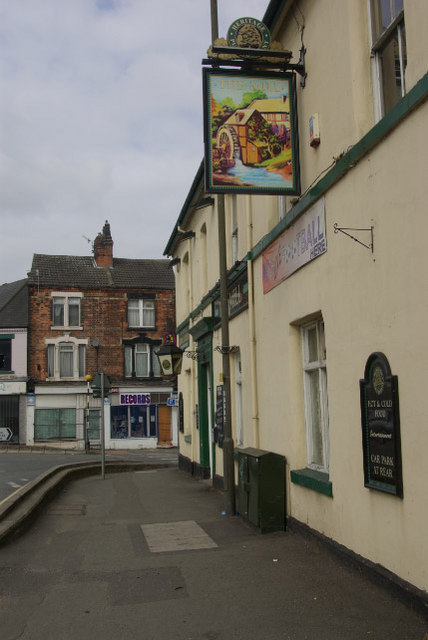
- The Mill in Langley Mill

- Aldercar and Langley Mill parish highlighted within Derbyshire
- Population: 5,405 (2011)
- OS grid reference: SK4399549067
- Shire county: Derbyshire
- Region: East Midlands
- Country: England
- Sovereign state: United Kingdom
- Post town: Nottingham
- Postcode district: NG16
- Police: Derbyshire
- Fire: Derbyshire
- Ambulance: East Midlands

Aldercar and Langley Mill is a civil parish in the Amber Valley district of Derbyshire, England. It includes the villages of Aldercar and Langley Mill, along with the hamlets of Stoneyford and Woodlinkin. The population of the civil parish taken at the 2011 Census was 5,405.

== See also ==
- Listed buildings in Aldercar and Langley Mill
