= Percy Mason =

English cricketer

Percy Mason (19 November 1873 – 27 November 1952) was an English first-class cricketer active 1896–1901 who played for Nottinghamshire. He was born in East Bridgford; died in Gunthorpe.
