= Listed buildings in East Bridgford =

East Bridgford is a civil parish in the Rushcliffe district of Nottinghamshire, England. The parish contains 20 listed buildings that are recorded in the National Heritage List for England. Of these, one is listed at Grade I, the highest of the three grades, and the others are at Grade II, the lowest grade. The parish contains the village of East Bridgford and the surrounding area. The listed buildings consist of houses and associated structures, farmhouses and farm buildings, a church and headstones in the churchyard, a former windmill, and a war memorial.

== Key ==
| Grade | Criteria |
|---|---|
| I | Buildings of exceptional interest, sometimes considered to be internationally important |
| II | Buildings of national importance and special interest |

== Buildings ==
| Name and location | Photograph | Date | Notes | Grade |
|---|---|---|---|---|
| St Peter's Church; 52.98110°N 0.97247°W | | 11th century | The church has been altered and extended through the centuries. It is built in stone and brick, and has roofs in slate and tile. The church consists of a nave with a clerestory, north and south aisles, a south porch, a chancel with an organ chamber and a Lady chapel, and a west tower. The tower has three stages, two string courses, an eaves band, an embattled parapet, and corner pinnacles with wind vanes. In the bottom stage is a west doorway with a moulded surround and a fanlight, in the middle stage is a clock face on the south side, and the top stage contains two-light bell openings. | I |
| Old Manor House; 52.98000°N 0.96706°W | | Early 16th century | A farmhouse with a timber framed core and some exposed close studding, it is mostly encased in brick and stone, on a rendered plinth, with cogged eaves, and roofs in pantile and tile, hipped and gabled, with one gable coped. There are two storeys and attics, and a T-shaped plan with a front of three bays. The windows are a mix of sashes and casements, and there are bay windows and French windows. On the garden side is a single-storey three-bay outbuilding. | II |
| 3 Kirk Hill; 52.98071°N 0.97246°W | — | Early 18th century | A dovecote converted into a house in the 19th century, it is built in cob and roughcast, on a rendered plinth, with brick dressings, and a pantile roof with brick coped gables and kneelers. There are two storeys and three bays. The windows on the front are sashes, and at the rear they are casements. | II |
| The Old Hall and outbuildings 52.98270°N 0.96960°W | | Early 18th century | A country house that has been extended, it is in brick with a floor band, cogged and dentilled eaves, and a tile roof with coped gables and kneelers. The main block has two storeys and attics, and five bays. In the centre, steps lead up to a Classical doorway with Gothick tracery, the windows are sashes, and in the roof are three gabled dormers. To the right is a two-storey wing containing a doorway with a segmental head and a fanlight, and cross mullioned casement windows. To the left is a single-storey outbuilding and a lean-to. The boundary wall is in brick, and coped, and contains a gateway with a segmental head and wrought iron gates. | II |
| Walnut Lodge and stables 52.97820°N 0.96784°W | | Early 18th century | The farmhouse is in brick on a stone plinth, with cogged eaves, and a pantile roof with coped gables and kneelers. There are two storeys, four bays, and a lower bay to the left. On the front is a two-storey porch with a hipped tile roof and doorways on each side, and casement windows. To the left is a single-storey dairy in brick, and further to the left are the stables, which are timber framed with brick nogging. | II |
| The Manor House and walls 52.98558°N 0.96861°W | | c. 1740 | A manor house, later extended and used for other purposes, it is in stuccoed brick on a stone plinth, with a moulded parapet, eaves and pediment, and a hipped slate roof. There are two storeys and five bays, and a square plan and a rear wing. On the east front, the middle bay projects under a pediment, and has a flat-roofed porch with double pilasters, a dentilled cornice and a parapet. The windows on the front are sashes, and at the rear are casement windows and two doorways, one with an elliptical head, and the other with a round head, a tiled surround and a fanlight. There are boundary walls to the west and the south, the former containing a segmental-headed gateway with an ornate wrought iron gate. | II |
| The Old Rectory; 52.98089°N 0.97308°W | | c. 1740 | The rectory, which has been extended, and later a private house, is in colourwashed stuccoed brick, on a plinth, with rebated and dentilled eaves, and a slate roof with coped gables and kneelers. There are two storeys and attics, and an L-shaped plan, with fronts of five bays, and a rear wing. Most of the windows are sashes. At the left of the east front is a two-storey canted bay window, and to the right is as latticed timber porch with a hood on pierced brackets and a doorway with a fanlight. On the south front is a canopied veranda on clustered iron posts with five French windows, and at the rear is a two-storey stair turret. | II |
| 63 Kneeton Road and farm buildings 52.98344°N 0.96948°W | | Mid 18th century | The farmhouse and adjoining farm buildings are in brick, on a plinth, with cogged eaves, and pantile roofs with coped gables and kneelers. There are two storeys and eight bays. The openings include doorways, stable doors, casement windows, some with segmental heads, square hatches and vents. | II |
| Windmill; 52.99224°N 0.95345°W | | 1769 | The windmill was raised in height from four to seven stages in 1852, and was later converted for residential use. It is in brick with cogged eaves, and is circular and tapering. Most of the windows are pivoted cross casements with stone lintels. There are two datestones, one with the details obliterated. | II |
| Three headstones 52.98102°N 0.97233°W | | 1775 | The headstones are in a group in the churchyard of St Peter's Church to the south of the chancel. They are to the memory of members of the Caunt family, they are in slate, and dated 1775, 1777 and 1810. The headstones have rounded and shaped heads, and contain inscriptions and ornate carvings. | II |
| The Hill; 52.98107°N 0.97397°W | — | 1792 | A country house in brick and stucco, on a plinth, with a floor band, dentilled and moulded eaves, and hipped roofs in slate and tile. There are two storeys and fronts of five and three bays. On the garden front is a full-height bow window with a parapet, and the east wing has a loggia with four Doric columns. The entrance front has a doorway with fluted columns and a pediment, and on the west front is a two-storey bay window with a conical roof. | II |
| Garden house, stable and wall, The Hill; 52.98062°N 0.97468°W | — | 1792 | The building is brick with stone dressings, embattled parapets, and a hipped and gabled roof with coped gables. It is in Gothick style, with one and two storeys and an L-shaped plan. On the front is a glasshouse, a doorway with a pointed arch, and a sash window. To the west is an extension containing casement windows. The flanking garden walls are buttressed, they are about 75 metres (246 ft) long, and contain two brick piers with slab caps, and wrought iron gates. | II |
| Stables and outbuildings, The Old Hall; 52.98258°N 0.96909°W | — | c. 1819 | The buildings are in brick with cogged eaves and roofs of pantile and tile. They are in one and two storeys, and have a C-shaped plan around a courtyard, with a front of five bays. The main southwest front contains a pair of carriage doors with a segmental head, and casement windows. On the southeast side is a tile-hung gazebo with a pyramidal roof, a French window, and a stair turret with a pyramidal roof and a weathercock. | II |
| Manor Lodge, wall and gateway 52.98545°N 0.96662°W | | c. 1820 | The lodge is in stuccoed brick on a rendered plinth, with stone dressings and a pyramidal slate roof. There is a single storey, a square plan with fronts of three bays, and a single-storey rear extension with a coped parapet. In the centre of the west front is a pair of doorways, and most of the windows are casements. The gateway has a pair of incurved walls with ramped slab coping, and two square stone gate piers with plinths and square domed caps, and there is a pair of stuccoed end piers. To the west is a brick boundary wall about 60 metres (200 ft) long. | II |
| Mulberry Close Farmhouse; 52.98368°N 0.96181°W | | 1820 | The farmhouse is in brick, with an eaves band, and a pantile roof with a corbelled gable band. There are two storeys, a double depth plan, three bays, and a single-storey extension on the left, The main doorway has a reeded surround, a fanlight, and an arched hood on curved brackets, and elsewhere there are two porches. The windows are a mix, mainly sashes with rubbed brick heads, and casements with segmental heads. In the north gable wall is a datestone. | II |
| 11 College Street; 52.98094°N 0.96652°W | | Early 19th century | The house is in stuccoed brick, with stone dressings, deep eaves and a pantile roof. There are three storeys and an L-shaped plan, with a front range of three bays, and a rear wing in one and two storeys. In the centre is a doorway with a moulded and reeded surround with paterae, and a hood. The windows on the front are sashes, those in the lower two floors with segmental heads. At the rear, the windows are casements. | II |
| Farm buildings, Mulberry Close; 52.98360°N 0.96115°W | | Early 19th century | The farm buildings are in brick, with dentilled and chamfered eaves, and pantile roofs with coped gables and Kneelers. They are in one and two storeys, they have a C-shaped plan, curving along the roadside, and 16 bays. The buildings consist of stables, a pigeoncote and cart sheds. They contain doorways, stable doors, casement windows, and a blocked pitching hole, and the pigeoncote has alighting shelves. | II |
| 24 College Street, barn, stable and wall 52.98163°N 0.96515°W | | 1826 | A farmhouse and attached buildings in brick, with pantile roofs. The house has an eaves band, two storeys, an L-shaped plan, and three bays. The doorway has a segmental head, most of the windows are sashes, and on the east gable end is a datestone. To the left are a barn and a stable, and to the right is a cowshed and another stable. The adjoining boundary wall is in brick, with ramped gabled stone coping, and it contains four square brick piers with concave pyramidal stone caps and a wrought iron gate. | II |
| Pump and trough, Old Manor House; 52.98017°N 0.96717°W | — | 1849 | The water pump is in lead with a plain cranked handle. It is contained in a softwood case with a small cap, and the cistern is inscribed with initials and the date. In front is a small stone trough with a rounded end. | II |
| War memorial cross 52.98112°N 0.97188°W | | 1920 | The war memorial is in the churchyard of St Peter's Church. It is in Derby gritstone, and consists of a pointed Latin cross with cusped projections at the angles between the cross-arms. The cross has an octagonal shaft, on a square plinth, on a base of three steps. On the plinth is a carved cross pattée symbol, and bronze plaques with inscriptions and the names of those lost in the two World Wars. | II |
