= Listed buildings in Kneeton =

Kneeton is a civil parish in the Rushcliffe district of Nottinghamshire, England. The parish contains ten listed buildings that are recorded in the National Heritage List for England. All the listed buildings are designated at Grade II, the lowest of the three grades, which is applied to "buildings of national importance and special interest". The parish contains the village of Kneeton and the surrounding area. All the listed buildings are in the village, and consist of a church, headstones in the churchyard, houses, cottages and associated structures, farmhouses and farm buildings.

== Buildings ==
Name and location	Photograph	Date	Notes
St Helen's Church; 53.00753°N 0.94362°W		14th century	The church has been altered and extended through the centuries, it was partly rebuilt in the 17th century, and restored and further rebuilt in 1880 by Ewan Christian. The church is built in stone with tile roofs, and consists of a nave, a south porch, a chancel, a vestry and a west tower. The tower is the oldest surviving part of the church, and has three stages, buttresses, two string courses, a triple lancet window on the west side, two-light bell openings, an eaves bands with four diagonal gargoyles, and an embattled parapet. The porch is gabled, and the doorway has a moulded surround, and shafts with octagonal capitals and bases.
Hall Farmhouse and wash house 53.00770°N 0.94483°W	—	17th century	The farmhouse, which was later extended, is in brick, with double corbelled eaves, and a tile roof with coped gables and kneelers. There are two storeys and attics, and five bays. On the front is a porch with a coped open pediment and a round-headed doorway with a fanlight, and the windows are sashes with segmental heads. To the left of the porch is a lean-to with a casement window, in the west gable end is a similar window and a datestone, and attached to the east gable end is a wash house with a door and a horizontally-sliding sash window.
Old Vicarage and wall 53.00680°N 0.94397°W	—	Late 17th century	The vicarage, which has been extended, and later used as a private house, is in brick and stone on plinths, with double corbelled eaves, and a pantile roof with coped gables and kneelers. There are two storeys and a T-shaped plan, with ranges of three bays. In the angle is a canted brick porch, and the windows are a mix of casements, many with mullions, and sashes, some with segmental heads. The boundary walls are coped, and contain a wooden gate flanked by chamfered square piers with pyramidal stone caps.
Group of three headstones 53.00749°N 0.94356°W	—	1717	The headstones are in the churchyard of St Helen's Church, to the south of the nave. They are in stone and slate, dated 1717, 1742 and 1748, and have various designs and inscriptions.
4 High Street, Mayfield Cottage and Corner Cottage; 53.00740°N 0.94215°W		Mid 18th century	A row of three cottages in brick on a plinth, with pantile roofs. There are two storeys a total of four bays, and rear extensions. The doorway and most of the windows, the majority of which are sashes, have segmental heads.
1 and 3 Kirklands Yard, barn and stables 53.00764°N 0.94234°W	—	Mid 18th century	A pair of cottages and adjoining farm buildings in brick on a partial plinth, with pantile roofs and two storeys. The cottages have rebated eaves, and a coped gable, seven bays, and contain doorways and mainly casement windows. The barn has dentilled eaves and pedimented gables, three bays, and it contains a datestone and openings, some with segmental heads.
Barn and adjoining stable, Hall Farm; 53.00779°N 0.94394°W	—	Mid 18th century	The barn and stable are in brick on a stone plinth, with quoins, double corbelled eaves, and a pantile roof with coped gables and kneelers. There are two storeys and five bays. The barn contains doorways, one with a segmental head, vents and pitching holes, and a semicircular loading platform, and the stable has doors and casement windows.
Timber framed barn, Hall Farm; 53.00784°N 0.94429°W		Mid 18th century	The farm, which incorporates earlier material, is in brick with stone dressings in the lower part and open timber framing above, and a pantile roof. The south front contains a doorway with a chamfered stone surround and a heavy lintel, and a window with a chamfered surround, and in the west gable end is a pitch hole.
Neale's Farmhouse; 53.00811°N 0.94326°W	—	Mid 18th century	The west wing was added to the farmhouse in the 19th century. The house is in brick on a chamfered plinth, with a floor band, cogged and dentilled eaves and a tile roof. There are three storeys and attics, and a T-shaped plan, with a front range of four bays, and a west wing. On the front is an embattled canted porch, and a doorway with a fanlight. The windows on the front are sashes, and elsewhere there are casement windows. At the rear is a canted bay window with a hipped roof, and on the northeast side is a porch and a two-storey bay window, both with hipped roofs.
3 Main Street; 53.00749°N 0.94233°W		Mid 19th century	A cottage in brick and stone, with rebated eaves, an eaves band and a pantile roof. There are two storeys, two bays, a square plan, a lean-to porch on the left, and a lean-to extension at the rear. The windows are casements, those in the ground floor at the front with segmental heads.
