= St Helen's Church, Kneeton =

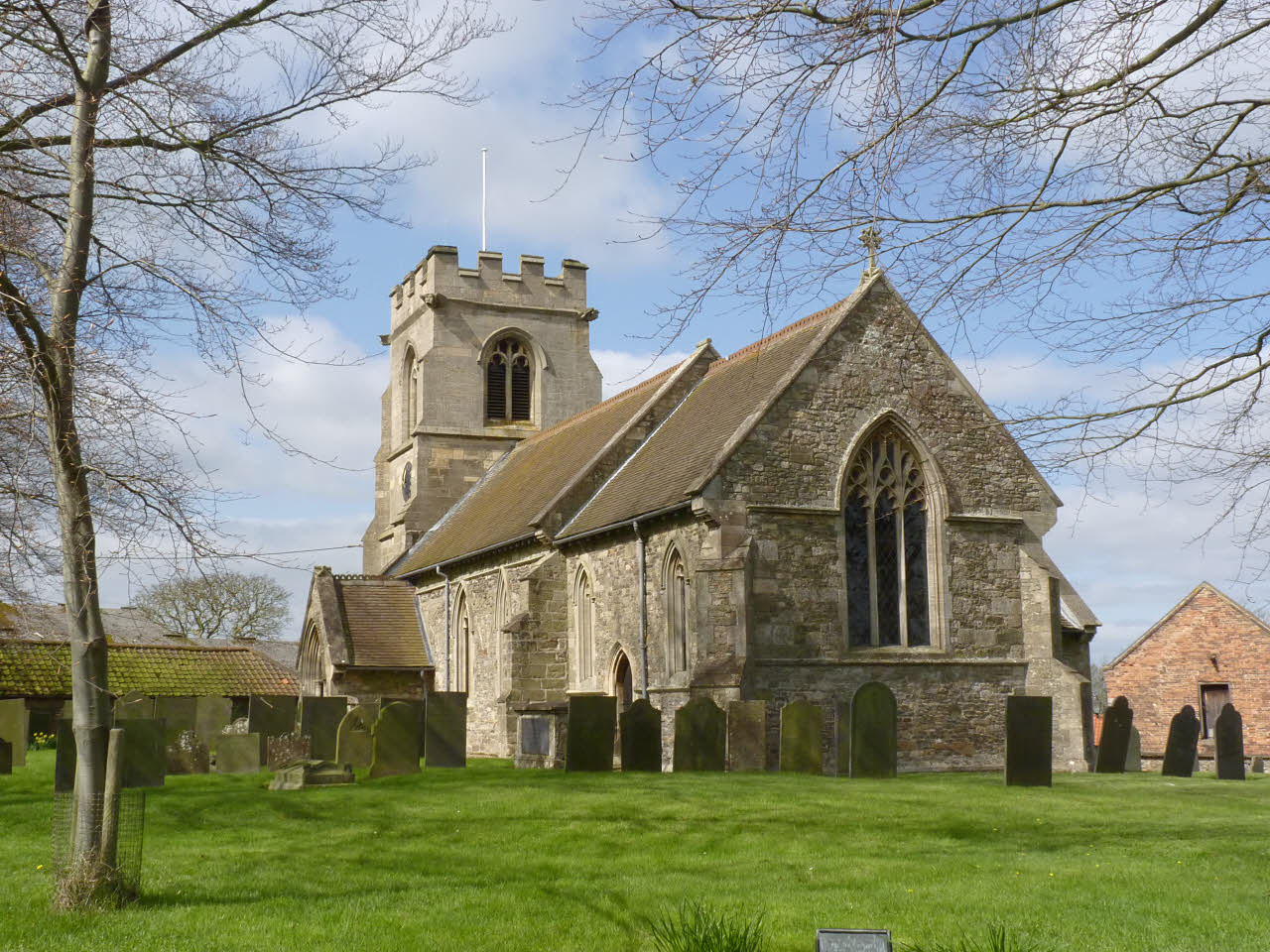
- St Helen's Church, Kneeton
- St Helen's Church, Kneeton
- 53°0′27.1″N 0°56′41.32″W
- OS grid reference: SK 70982 46097
- Location: Kneeton
- Country: England
- Denomination: Church of England

History
- Dedication: St. Helen

Architecture
- Heritage designation: Grade II listed

Administration
- Diocese: Diocese of Southwell and Nottingham
- Archdeaconry: Nottingham
- Deanery: East Bingham
- Parish: East Bridgford

St Helen's Church, Kneeton is a Grade II listed parish church in the Church of England in Kneeton, Nottinghamshire, England.

== History ==
The church was dates from the 14th century. It was restored and partly rebuilt by Ewan Christian between 1879 and 1890.

It is in a joint parish with St Peter's Church, East Bridgford.

== Organ ==
The church contains an organ by Taylor of Leicester which was formerly in Wigston Magna Methodist Church, then Markfield Methodist Church, then Castle Donington Methodist Church and then the Bluecoat School, Nottingham. It was installed here in 1978 by David Butterworth. A specification of the organ can be found on the National Pipe Organ Register.

== See also ==
- Listed buildings in Kneeton
