= Kneeton =

Hamlet and civil parish in Nottinghamshire, England

Coordinates: 53°00′N 0°56′W

- Hamlet and civil parish
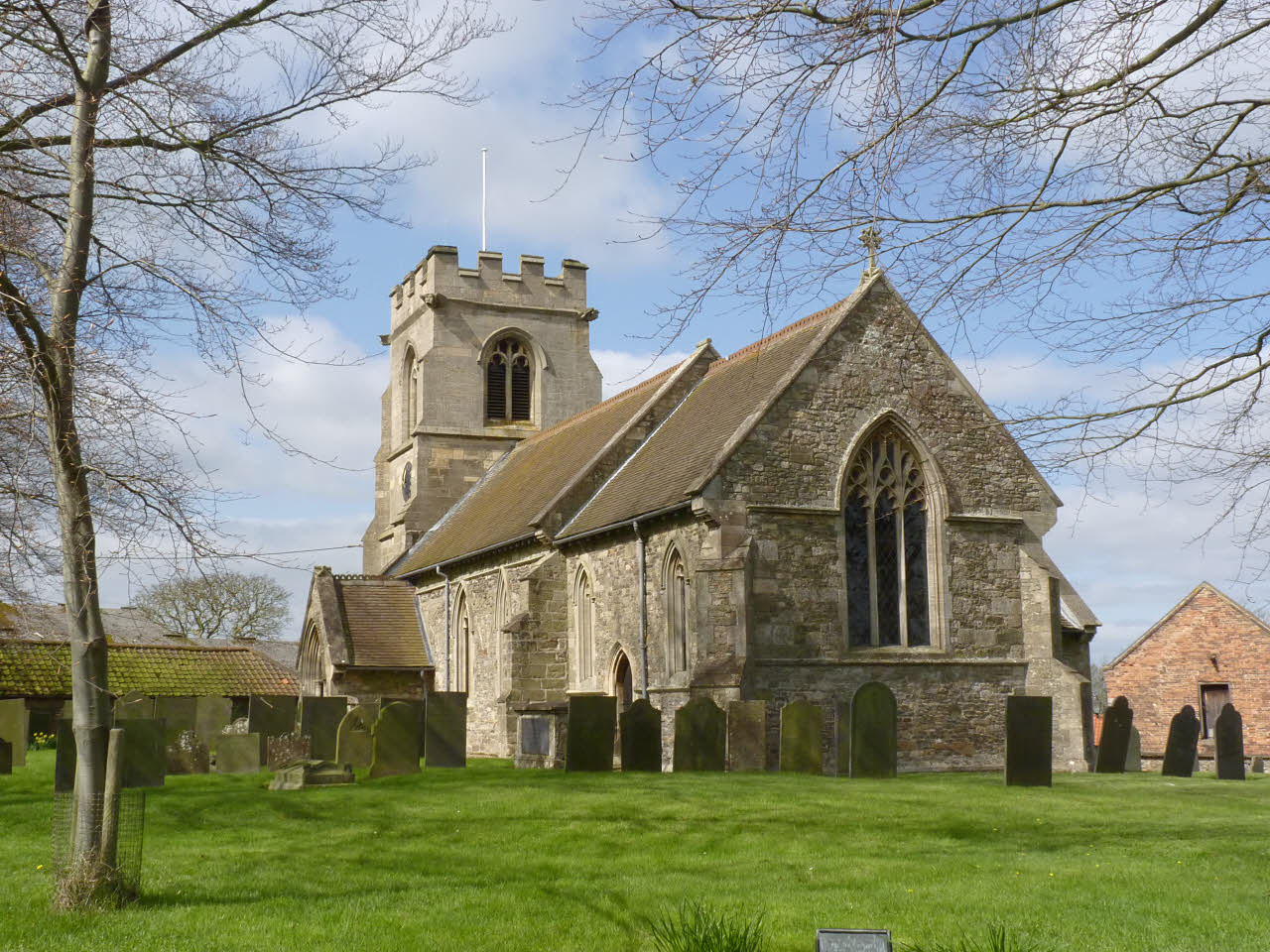
- St Helen's church

- Location within Nottinghamshire
- Interactive map of Kneeton
- Area: 1.58 sq mi (4.1 km^{2})
- Population: 47 (2021)
  - Density: 30/sq mi (12/km^{2})
- OS grid reference: SK 710460
  - London: 110 mi (180 km) SSE
- District: Rushcliffe
- Shire county: Nottinghamshire
- Region: East Midlands
- Country: England
- Sovereign state: United Kingdom
- Post town: Nottingham
- Postcode district: NG13
- Dialling code: 01636
- Police: Nottinghamshire
- Fire: Nottinghamshire
- Ambulance: East Midlands
- UK Parliament: Newark

Kneeton is a hamlet and civil parish in the county of Nottinghamshire, England. The population as of the 2011 census remained less than 100 so was included in the civil parish count for Screveton, it was however reported as 47 residents at the 2021 census. The village lies on the A46 road between Nottingham and Newark and is on the escarpment of the Trent Hills that sit above the flood plain of the River Trent. RAF Syerston is nearby. There is a railway station at Lowdham. The church is 14th century Grade II listed, and dedicated to St. Helen. A mid-18th century Grade II listed barn survives at Hall Farm, Kneeton.

== Toponymy ==
Kneeton seems to contain the Old English feminine personal name, Cēngifu, + tūn (Old English), an enclosure; a farmstead; a village; an estate.., so 'Cengifu's farm/settlement'.

== Historical ==
White's Directory of Nottinghamshire described Kneeton in 1853 as:

"Kneeton, or Kneveton, is a small village and parish, occupying a commanding situation upon a lofy precipitous cliff on the south side of the Trent, 8 miles south-west of Newark. It contains 169 inhabitants and 990 acres of land, all belonging to the Earl of Caernarvon, except about 140 acres. A great part of the manor was given to Welbeck Abbey, but in the reign of Edward VI it was held of the King in capite by Sir Edward Molyneux, whose descendants resided here for many generations. The family mansion, however, was taken down in 1781, when their estates passed with their sole heiress to the Late Lord Howard, whose daughter, the Hon. Henrietta Howard Molyneux, was married in 1830 to Lord Porchester. Lord Caernarvon is lord of the manor, and patron of the living, which is valued in the King's books at £4 9s 4d (now £58), but has received three augmentations from Queen Anne's Bounty, two of which have been laid out in land, and the third, £400, is still in the augmentation office. The Rev. Richard R. Rawlins is the incumbent. The church is a small fabric, with a tower and three bells, and contains several ancient monuments of the Story family. The view in the vicinity are beautiful and extensive, including a considerable portion of the picturesque vales of the Trent and Belvoir."

== See also ==
- Listed buildings in Kneeton
