= Relief of the Poor Act 1795 =

Act of the Parliament of Great Britain

- Act of Parliament
- Parliament of Great Britain
- Long title: An Act to amend so much of an Act, made in the Ninth Year of the Reign of King George the First, intituled, "An Act for amending the Laws relating to the Settlement, Employment, and Relief of the Poor," as prevents the distributing occasional Relief to Poor Persons in their own Houses, under certain Circumstances and in certain Cases.
- Citation: 36 Geo. 3. c. 23
- Territorial extent: Great Britain

Dates
- Royal assent: 24 December 1795
- Commencement: 24 December 1795 (Note: Section 1.)
- Repealed: 14 August 1834
Other legislation
Amends	Poor Relief Act 1722
Repealed by	Poor Law Amendment Act 1834

Status: Repealed

Text of statute as originally enacted

The Relief of the Poor Act 1795 (36 Geo. 3. c. 23) was an act of the Parliament of Great Britain.

The act amended the Poor Relief Act 1722 by repealing those clauses that prohibited outdoor relief. The Act claimed that this was necessary because the prohibition had been "found inconvenient and oppressive, inasmuch as it often prevents an industrious poor person from receiving such occasional relief as is best suited to his peculiar case, and in certain cases holds out conditions of relief injurious to the comfort and domestic situation and happiness of such poor persons".

The act enabled poor relief overseers in every parish (with the permission from the vestry or a justice of the peace) to award poor relief to any industrious poor person in their home without requiring them to enter a workhouse. The act also empowered justices of the peace to award poor relief to any industrious poor person in their home for one month. However, two justices of the peace could extend relief for another month "and so on from time to time, as the occasion shall require".

== Subsequent developments ==
The whole act was repealed by section 53 of the Poor Law Amendment Act 1834 (4 & 5 Will. 4. c. 76), which came into force on 14 August 1834.
