= St Peter's Church, East Bridgford =

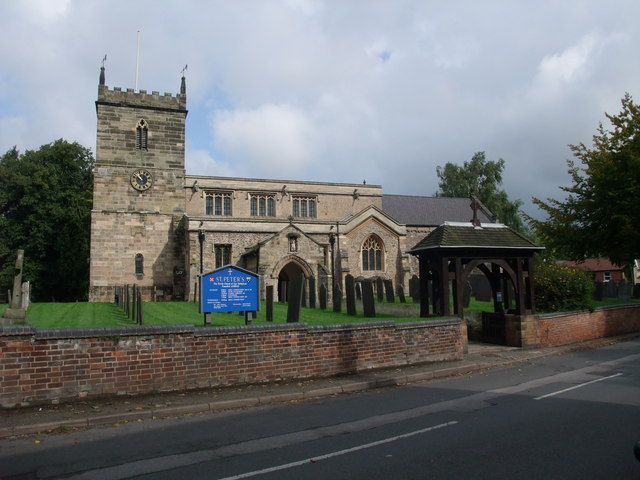
- St Peter's Church, East Bridgford
- St Peter's Church, East Bridgford
- 52°58′51.54″N 0°58′22.31″W
- OS grid reference: SK 69086 43130
- Location: East Bridgford
- Country: England
- Denomination: Church of England

History
- Dedication: St Peter

Architecture
- Heritage designation: Grade I listed

Administration
- Diocese: Diocese of Southwell and Nottingham
- Archdeaconry: Nottingham
- Deanery: East Bingham
- Parish: East Bridgford

St Peter's Church is a Grade I listed parish church in the Church of England in East Bridgford, Nottinghamshire, England.

== History ==
The church was dates from the 11th century. It was restored in 1671 and 1686. The tower was rebuilt in 1778 by Francis Moore. The chancel windows were renewed in 1862. The organ chamber and lady chapel were rebuilt in 1862. There were 3 periods of restoration work in the early 20th century by C.E. Pointing - in 1901, 1903 and 1914.

The church is in a joint parish with St Helen's Church, Kneeton.

== Churchyard ==
The churchyard contains 3 headstones dating from 1775, 1777, and 1810 which are Grade II listed. In slate, they are to the Caunt family.

- That to the left has shouldered round head, with foliate borders. Dated 1775 it is signed "Brown, Whatton".
- The central stone has double shouldered round head, with foliate borders, cartouche containing globe, and inscription. To Joseph Caunt, 1810. Signed "Jones Sculp."
- That to the right has stepped round head and Adam style border with urns. Cartouche with Divine Monogram and angels. To Thomas Caunt, 1777. Signed "R. Brown Sculp."

== Organ ==
The church contains an organ dating from 1875 by Wordsworth and Maskell. This has been subsequently restored by Peter Conacher in 1906, Roger Yates in 1937 and Alan Douglas in 1983. A specification of the organ can be found on the National Pipe Organ Register.

== See also ==
- Grade I listed buildings in Nottinghamshire
- Listed buildings in East Bridgford
