= East Bridgford =

Village and civil parish in Nottinghamshire, England

Coordinates: 52.981°N 0.967°W

- Village and civil parish
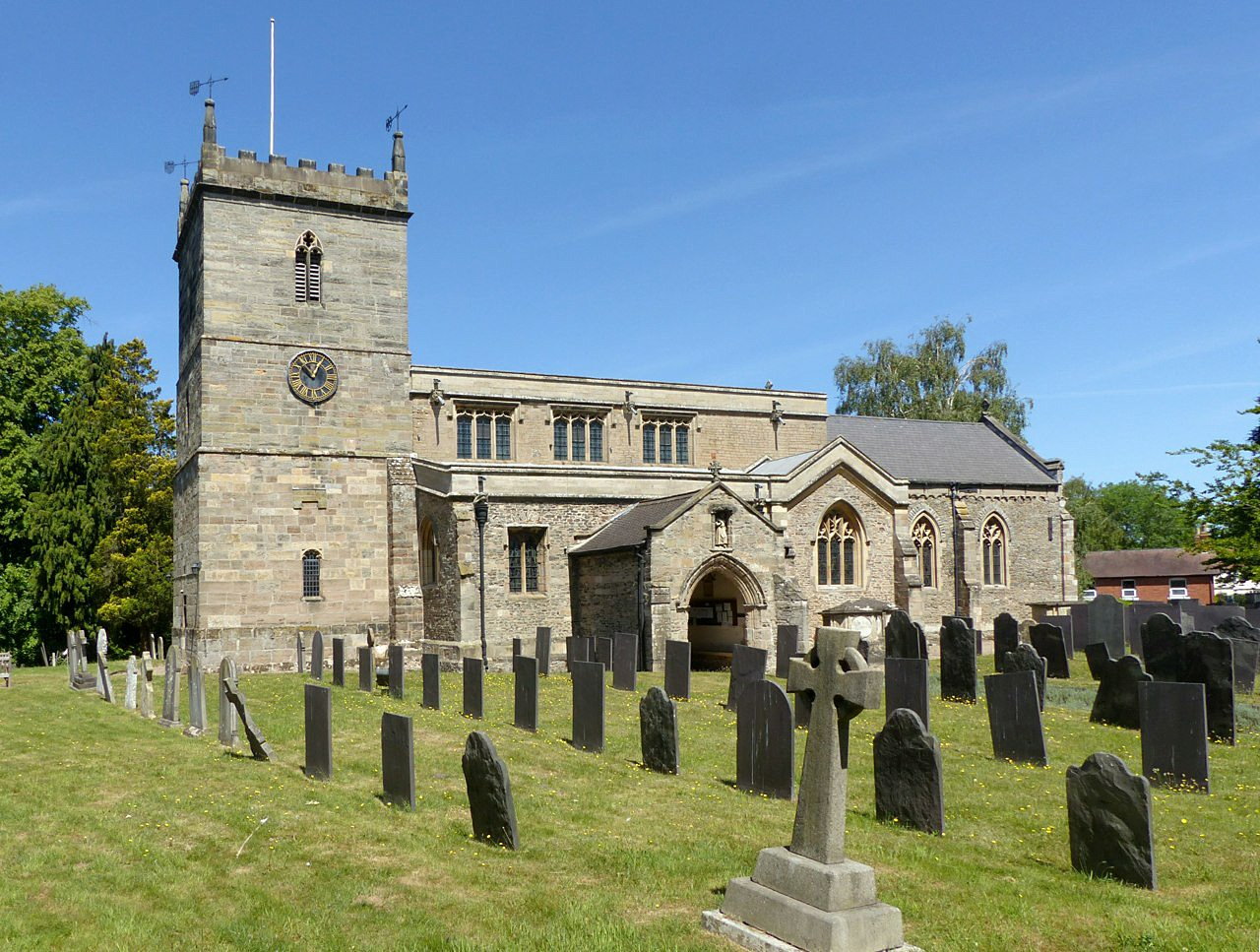
- St Peter's Church, East Bridgford dating from the 11th century

- Location within Nottinghamshire
- Interactive map of East Bridgford
- Area: 3.06 sq mi (7.9 km^{2})
- Population: 1,763 (2021)
  - Density: 576/sq mi (222/km^{2})
- OS grid reference: SK 694432
  - London: 105 mi (169 km) SSE
- District: Rushcliffe
- Shire county: Nottinghamshire
- Region: East Midlands
- Country: England
- Sovereign state: United Kingdom
- Post town: NOTTINGHAM
- Postcode district: NG13
- Dialling code: 01949
- Police: Nottinghamshire
- Fire: Nottinghamshire
- Ambulance: East Midlands
- UK Parliament: Newark
- Website: www.eastbridgford-pc.gov.uk

East Bridgford is a village and civil parish in the Rushcliffe borough of Nottinghamshire, east of the city of Nottingham. It had a population of 1,814 at the 2011 census, falling to 1,763 at the 2021 census. The village adjoins the south bank of the River Trent, opposite the village of Gunthorpe. It is on the Trent Valley Way. East Bridgford's annual village show is run by the village Horticultural Society, established in 1864, and held every Feast Week.

== History ==
"East Bridgford, or Bridgeford on the Hill, is a large and well built village, on the summit of a precipitous bank, that rises on the south side of the Trent, opposite Gunthorpe Ferry. The parish contains 1,155 inhabitants, and 1,910 acres (7.7 km^{2}) of loamy land, which was enclosed in 1798, when 326 acres (now called New Bridgford), were allotted in lieu of rectorial tithes. The greater part of the parish belongs to Magdalen College, Oxford, with the remainder belonging to several freeholders. In the parish is found both opaque and transparent gypsum, the latter of which is very beautiful, and during the last twenty years has been in great demand amongst the lepidaries of Derby and other places, who turn it into beads and various other ornaments, in which it looks as brilliant and richly variegated as the Derbyshire spar. There are several neat mansions on the village, occupied by Captain Geo. Bohun Martin, Mrs Brooks, and Geo. Beaumont Esq."

— White's Directory of Nottinghamshire 1853

The population of the village was 526 in 1801, 1155 in 1851, and 756 in 1901 The parish church is that of St. Peter.

== Education ==
The village has one school, St Peter's Church of England Primary School. Rated Outstanding in its last inspection report by Ofsted (2007), it was termed "an outstanding school, in which pupils... reach exceptionally high standards." It came fifth in the country in 2011 by SAT scores achieved.

== Windmills ==
There existed two red-brick windmills in East Bridgford, one at the northern and one at the southern end of the village. These were called Kneeton Hills Mill and Stokes' Mill respectively. Some recent photographs of these can be seen. Both have been converted into residences.

Kneeton Hills Mill has a date stone of 1841, although cartographic evidence suggests it was built in the latter half of the 18th century. It originally had four sails on a four-storey tower. The tower was extended by two storeys in about 1841 and fitted with six sails. It became disused about 1891.

Stokes' Mill was built about 1828 with four double-shuttered patent sails on a six-storey tower. It ceased working about 1912. The sails were struck by lightning in 1928 and the cap, machinery and second-floor gallery were removed about 1940. The tower is 58 ft (18 metres) high.

== Notable people ==
- Arthur Richardson (1860–1936), a merchant and member of Parliament, was born in East Bridgford.
- Percy Mason (1873–1952), a first-class cricketer with Nottinghamshire County Cricket Club, was born in East Bridgford.

== See also ==
- West Bridgford
- Bingham, Nottinghamshire
- Listed buildings in East Bridgford
