= Poor Relief Act 1722 =

Act of the Parliament of Great Britain

Poor Relief Act 1722 (Note: The citation of this act by this short title was authorised by section 1 of, and the first schedule to, the Short Titles Act 1896. Due to the repeal of those provisions it is now authorised by section 19(2) of the Interpretation Act 1978.)
- Act of Parliament
- Parliament of Great Britain
- Long title: An Act for Amending the Laws relating to the Settlement, Employment, and Relief of the Poor.
- Citation: 9 Geo. 1. c. 7
- Territorial extent: Great Britain

Dates
- Royal assent: 22 March 1723
- Commencement: 25 March 1723 (Note: Section 1.)
- Repealed: 30 July 1948
Other legislation
Amended by	Relief of the Poor Act 1795; Statute Law Revision Act 1887; Statute Law Revision Act 1888
Repealed by	Poor Law Act 1927; Statute Law Revision Act 1948
Relates to	Poor Relief Act 1691

Status: Repealed

Text of statute as originally enacted

The Poor Relief Act 1722 (9 Geo. 1. c. 7), also known as the Workhouse Test Act 1722, Workhouse Test Act 1723 or Knatchbull's Act, was an act of the Parliament of Great Britain. It was titled "An Act for Amending the Laws relating to the Settlement, Employment, and Relief of the Poor".

The act repeated the clause of the Poor Relief Act 1691 (3 Will. & Mar. c. 11) that ordered that in every parish a book should be kept, registering the names of everyone receiving relief and the reasons why. No one else was permitted to receive relief (except in cases of disease, plague or smallpox) except by authority of a justice of the peace who lived in or near the parish or who was visiting during quarter sessions.

The act claimed that "many persons have applied to some justices of peace without the knowledge of any officers of the parish, and thereby, upon untrue suggestions, and sometimes upon false and frivolous pretences, have obtained relief, which hath greatly contributed to the increase of the parish rates". To rectify this, the act ordered that no justice of the peace could award poor relief until the recipient had taken an oath on the reason why they needed to claim relief. This was applicable in cases where the overseers or the vestry had refused someone relief and the act ordered that the Justice of the Peace was first required to summon the overseer to discover why that relief had been refused. The act reiterated the need for the Justice of the Peace to register this relief and stipulated that such relief should continue only so long as the causes for it continued. Any overseer or parish officer who awarded relief without first registering it "except upon sudden and emergent occasions" was to be punished by forfeiting and paying £5 to be used for the poor of the parish.

The act also empowered churchwardens and overseers (with the consent of the vestry) "to purchase or hire any house or houses, and to contract with any persons for the lodging, keeping, maintaining and employing any or all such poor persons in their respective parishes, etc., as shall desire to receive relief, and there to keep, maintain, and employ all such poor persons, and take the benefit of Parishes their work, labour, and service". Where a parish could not afford to maintain a workhouse on their own, the act permitted the parish to join other parishes in purchasing a building for this purpose, so long as it had the permission of the vestry and a local Justice of the Peace.

If a poor person refused to be lodged in a workhouse, the act ordered them to be "put out of the book in which the names of persons who ought to receive relief are registered, and [they] shall not be entitled to ask or receive relief from the churchwardens and overseers".

== Subsequent developments ==
The Relief of the Poor Act 1782 was a poor relief law proposed by Thomas Gilbert which aimed to organise poor relief on a county basis, counties being organised into parishes which could set up poorhouses or workhouses between them. However, these workhouses were intended to help only the elderly, sick and orphaned, not the able-bodied poor. The sick, elderly and infirm were cared for in poorhouses whereas the able-bodied poor were provided with poor relief in their own homes. During the 1780s, there was an increase in unemployment and underemployment due to high food prices, low wages and the effects of enclosing land. This caused poor rates to increase rapidly, which wealthy landowners found unacceptable.

The whole act except section 3 was repealed by section 245(1) of, and the eleventh schedule to, Poor Law Act 1927 (17 & 18 Geo. 5. c. 14), which came into force on 1 October 1927.

The whole act, so far as unrepealed, was repealed by section 1 of, and the first schedule to, the Statute Law Revision Act 1948 (11 & 12 Geo. 6. c. 62), which came into force on 30 July 1948.
