= Duty on Hair Powder Act 1795 =

Act of the Parliament of Great Britain

- Act of Parliament
- Parliament of Great Britain
- Long title: An Act for granting to His Majesty a Duty on Certificates issued for using Hair Powder.
- Citation: 35 Geo. 3. c. 49
- Territorial extent: Great Britain

Dates
- Royal assent: 30 April 1795
- Commencement: 5 May 1795 (Note: Section 1.)
- Repealed: 6 August 1861
Other legislation
Amended by	Hair Powder Certificates, etc. Act 1795
Repealed by	Statute Law Revision Act 1861

Status: Repealed

Text of statute as originally enacted

The Duty on Hair Powder Act 1795 (35 Geo. 3. c. 49) was an act of the Parliament of Great Britain which levied a tax on hair powder. The tax was used to finance government programmes, especially to fund the Revolutionary and Napoleonic Wars with France. The Act was repealed in 1861.

== Provisions ==
The act stated that everyone wishing to use hair powder must, from 5 May 1795, visit a stamp office to enter their name and pay for an annual certificate costing 1 guinea (equivalent to £100 in 2020). Certain exemptions were included: the Royal Family and their servants; clergymen with an income of under £100 a year; and members of the armed forces who were privates in the army, artillery soldiers, mariners, engineers, non-commissioned officers, subalterns, officers in the navy below commander, yeomanry, militia, fencibles, and volunteers. A father with more than two unmarried daughters could buy two certificates that would be valid for any number he stated at the stamp office. The master of a household could buy a certificate for a number of his servants, and that certificate would also be valid for their successors within that year.

Substantial fines could be imposed on those brought before the courts.

At the quarter sessions of the peace held at Bourne, in Lincolnshire on Tuesday se'nnight, the Rev. Francis Barstow, of Aslackby, was convicted in the penalty of twenty pounds, for wearing hair powder without having previously taken out a licence.

== Effects ==
Hair Powder Certificates, etc. Act 1795
- Act of Parliament
- Parliament of Great Britain
- Long title: An Act for allowing further Time for Persons to take out Certificates for using or wearing Hair Powder, in pursuance of an Act of this present Session of Parliament, intituled, "An Act for granting to His Majesty a Duty on Certificates issued for using Hair Powder; and also further time for the Admeasurement and Registering of Boats, Barges and other Vessels, in pursuance of another Act of the same Session, intituled, An Act for requiring all Boats, Barges and other Vessels, of certain Descriptions, used on Navigable Rivers, and on Inland Navigations, in Great Britain, to be registered."
- Citation: 35 Geo. 3. c. 112
- Territorial extent: Great Britain

Dates
- Royal assent: 26 June 1795
- Commencement: 26 June 1795 (Note: The Acts of Parliament (Commencement) Act 1793.)
- Expired: 20 July 1795
- Repealed: 21 August 1871
Other legislation
Amends	Duty on Hair Powder Act 1795; Registry of Boats, etc. Act 1795
Repealed by	Statute Law Revision Act 1871

Status: Repealed

Text of statute as originally enacted

The Hair Powder Certificates, etc. Act 1795 (35 Geo. 3. c. 112) was passed later in the same session of Parliament to allow people more time to apply for certificates.

The wearing of powdered wigs tied in a queue according to the fashion of the 18th century had already been declining, and the tax speeded this decline, resulting in the change of dress in the 1790s. In its first year, the tax raised £200,000. In 1812, 46,684 people still paid the tax. In 1855, only 997 did and almost all of these were servants. By the time it was repealed in 1861, it yielded an annual revenue of £1,000.

According to author Jenny Uglow, those who chose to pay the guinea hair powder tax were nicknamed "guinea-pigs" by reformist Whigs who chose instead to cut their hair short (the "French" cut) and go without a wig as an expression of solidarity with the French. Those deriding hair-powder taxpayers as "guinea-pigs" were, in turn, satirised by The Times as members of the "Crop Club" wearing the "Bedford Level", a reference to Francis Russell, 5th Duke of Bedford.

== Subsequent developments ==
The whole act was repealed by section 1 of, and the schedule to, the Statute Law Revision Act 1861 (24 & 25 Vict. c. 101), which came into force on 6 August 1861.
