= List of acts of the Parliament of Great Britain from 1795 =

This is a complete list of acts of the Parliament of Great Britain for the year 1795.

For acts passed until 1707, see the list of acts of the Parliament of England and the list of acts of the Parliament of Scotland. See also the list of acts of the Parliament of Ireland.

For acts passed from 1801 onwards, see the list of acts of the Parliament of the United Kingdom. For acts of the devolved parliaments and assemblies in the United Kingdom, see the list of acts of the Scottish Parliament, the list of acts of the Northern Ireland Assembly, and the list of acts and measures of Senedd Cymru; see also the list of acts of the Parliament of Northern Ireland.

The number shown after each act's title is its chapter number. Acts are cited using this number, preceded by the year(s) of the reign during which the relevant parliamentary session was held; thus the Union with Ireland Act 1800 is cited as "39 & 40 Geo. 3. c. 67", meaning the 67th act passed during the session that started in the 39th year of the reign of George III and which finished in the 40th year of that reign. Note that the modern convention is to use Arabic numerals in citations (thus "41 Geo. 3" rather than "41 Geo. III"). Acts of the last session of the Parliament of Great Britain and the first session of the Parliament of the United Kingdom are both cited as "41 Geo. 3".

Acts passed by the Parliament of Great Britain did not have a short title; however, some of these acts have subsequently been given a short title by acts of the Parliament of the United Kingdom (such as the Short Titles Act 1896).

== 35 Geo. 3 ==
The fifth session of the 17th Parliament of Great Britain, which met from 30 December 1794 until 27 June 1795.

This session was also traditionally cited as 35 G. 3.

=== Public acts ===
Short title	Citation	Royal assent
Long title
Duties on Malt, etc. Act 1795 (repealed)	35 Geo. 3. c. 1	21 January 1795
An act for continuing and granting to his Majesty certain duties upon malt, mumm, cyder, and perry, for the service of the year one thousand seven hundred and ninety-five. (Repealed by Statute Law Revision Act 1871 (34 & 35 Vict. c. 116))
Land Tax Act 1795 (repealed)	35 Geo. 3. c. 2	21 January 1795
An act for granting an aid to his Majesty by a land tax, to be raised in Great-Britain, for the service of the year one thousand seven hundred and ninety-five. (Repealed by Statute Law Revision Act 1871 (34 & 35 Vict. c. 116))
Habeas Corpus Suspension Act 1795 (repealed)	35 Geo. 3. c. 3	5 February 1795
An act to continue, for a limited time, an act, made in the last session of parliament, intituled, "An act to impower his Majesty to secure and detain such persons as his Majesty shall suspect are conspiring against his person and government." (Note: Habeas Corpus Suspension Act 1794 (34 Geo. 3. c. 54)) (Repealed by Statute Law Revision Act 1871 (34 & 35 Vict. c. 116))
Exportation and Importation Act 1795 (repealed)	35 Geo. 3. c. 4	13 February 1795
An act for enabling his Majesty to prohibit the exportation, and permit the importation, of corn, and for allowing the importation of other articles of provision, for a limited time, without payment of duty. (Repealed by Statute Law Revision Act 1871 (34 & 35 Vict. c. 116))
Manning of the Navy Act 1795 (repealed)	35 Geo. 3. c. 5	5 March 1795
An act for raising a certain number of men, in the several counties in England, for the service of his Majesty's navy. (Repealed by Statute Law Revision Act 1871 (34 & 35 Vict. c. 116))
Mutiny Act 1795 (repealed)	35 Geo. 3. c. 6	5 March 1795
An act for punishing mutiny and desertion; and for the better payment of the army and their quarters. (Repealed by Statute Law Revision Act 1871 (34 & 35 Vict. c. 116))
Marine Mutiny Act 1795 (repealed)	35 Geo. 3. c. 7	5 March 1795
An act for the regulation of his Majesty's marine forces while on shore. (Repealed by Statute Law Revision Act 1871 (34 & 35 Vict. c. 116))
Grand Junction Canal (No. 1) Act 1795	35 Geo. 3. c. 8	5 March 1795
An Act for authorizing the Company of the Grand Junction Canal to vary the Course of a certain Part of the said Canal, in the county of Hertford, so as to render the Navigation thereof more safe and convenient, and for making some other Amendments and Alterations in an Act made in the Thirty-third Year of the Reign of his present Majesty, (Note: Grand Junction Canal Act 1793 (33 Geo. 3. c. 80)) for making the said Canal.
Manning of the Navy (No. 2) Act 1795 (repealed)	35 Geo. 3. c. 9	16 March 1795
An Act for procuring a supply of men from the several ports of this kingdom for the service of his Majesty's navy. (Repealed by Statute Law Revision Act 1871 (34 & 35 Vict. c. 116))
Excise Act 1795 (repealed)	35 Geo. 3. c. 10	16 March 1795
An act for granting to his Majesty additional duties of excise on foreign wine and sweets. (Repealed by Statute Law Revision Act 1861 (24 & 25 Vict. c. 101))
Excise (No. 2) Act 1795 (repealed)	35 Geo. 3. c. 11	16 March 1795
An act for granting to his Majesty additional duties of excise on worts, wash, and other liquors, made in England, for extracting spirits for home consumption; and for preventing distillers from making use of wheat or wheat flour in making wash for extracting spirits. (Repealed by Statute Law Revision Act 1861 (24 & 25 Vict. c. 101))
Excise (No. 3) Act 1795 (repealed)	35 Geo. 3. c. 12	16 March 1795
An Act for granting to his Majesty additional duties of excise on foreign spirits. (Repealed by Statute Law Revision Act 1861 (24 & 25 Vict. c. 101))
Excise (No. 4) Act 1795 (repealed)	35 Geo. 3. c. 13	16 March 1795
An Act for granting to his Majesty additional duties of excise on tea coffee and cocoa nuts. (Repealed by Statute Law Revision Act 1861 (24 & 25 Vict. c. 101))
National Debt Act 1795 (repealed)	35 Geo. 3. c. 14	16 March 1795
An Act for raising the sum of eighteen millions by way of annuities. (Repealed by Statute Law Revision Act 1870 (33 & 34 Vict. c. 69))
Importation Act 1795 (repealed)	35 Geo. 3. c. 15	16 March 1795
An act for rendering official his Majesty's orders in council of the sixteenth and twenty-first days of January one thousand seven hundred and ninety-five, respecting the admission of the effects mentioned in the said orders into the ports of this country, to be warehoused and for indemnifying all persons who have acted in consequence of such orders. (Repealed by Goods in Neutral Ships Act 1802 (42 Geo. 3. c. 80))
Militia, Derbyshire Act 1795 (repealed)	35 Geo. 3. c. 16	16 March 1795
An act for applying certain sums of money, raised in the county of Derby, by virtue of several acts of parliament made respecting the militia of this kingdom. (Repealed by Statute Law Revision Act 1871 (34 & 35 Vict. c. 116))
Land Tax (No. 2) Act 1795 (repealed)	35 Geo. 3. c. 17	16 March 1795
An act for appointing commissioners to put in execution an act of this session of parliament, intituled, "An act for granting an aid to his Majesty by a land tax, to be raised in Great Britain, for the service of the year one thousand seven hundred and ninety-five," (Note: Land Tax Act 1795 (35 Geo. 3. c. 2)) together with those named in two former acts, for appointing commissioners of the land tax. (Repealed by Statute Law Revision Act 1871 (34 & 35 Vict. c. 116))
Criminal Court, Norfolk Island Act 1795 (repealed)	35 Geo. 3. c. 18	16 March 1795
An Act to repeal an act made in the last session of parliament, intituled, "An act to enable his Majesty to establish a court of judicature in Norfolk Island;" (Note: Criminal Court, Norfolk Island Act 1794 (34 Geo. 3. c. 45)) and for better enabling his Majesty to establish such court in the said island. (Repealed by Norfolk Island Act 1834 (4 & 5 Will. 4. c. 65))
Manning of the Navy (No. 3) Act 1795 (repealed)	35 Geo. 3. c. 19	27 March 1795
An act for rendering more effectual an act of the present session of parliament, intituled, "An act for raising a certain number of men, in the several counties in England, for the service of his Majesty's navy." (Note: Manning of the Navy Act 1795 (35 Geo. 3. c. 5)) (Repealed by Statute Law Revision Act 1871 (34 & 35 Vict. c. 116))
Customs Act 1795 (repealed)	35 Geo. 3. c. 20	27 March 1795
An act for granting certain duties of customs on the importation of fruit, sallad oil, waste silk, and timber, and on the exportation of British rock salt and coal. (Repealed by Statute Law Revision Act 1861 (24 & 25 Vict. c. 101))
Loans or Exchequer Bills Act 1795 (repealed)	35 Geo. 3. c. 21	27 March 1795
An act for raising a certain sum of money, by loans or exchequer bills, for the service of the year one thousand seven hundred and ninety-five. (Repealed by Statute Law Revision Act 1871 (34 & 35 Vict. c. 116))
Loans or Exchequer Bills (No. 2) Act 1795 (repealed)	35 Geo. 3. c. 22	27 March 1795
An Act for raising a further sum of money by loans or exchequer bills for the service of the year one thousand seven hundred and ninety five. (Repealed by Statute Law Revision Act 1871 (34 & 35 Vict. c. 116))
National Debt (No. 2) Act 1795 (repealed)	35 Geo. 3. c. 23	27 March 1795
An act granting to his Majesty the sum of two hundred thousand pounds, to be issued and paid to the governor and company of the bank of England, to be by them placed to the account of the commissioners for the reduction of the national debt. (Repealed by Statute Law Revision Act 1861 (24 & 25 Vict. c. 101))
Aliens Act 1795 (repealed)	35 Geo. 3. c. 24	28 April 1795
An act further to continue an act made in the thirty-third year of his Majesty's reign, intituled, "An act for establishing regulations respecting aliens arriving in this kingdom, or resident therein, in certain cases." (Note: Aliens Act 1793 (33 Geo. 3. c. 4)) (Repealed by Statute Law Revision Act 1871 (34 & 35 Vict. c. 116))
Courts (Newfoundland) Act 1795 (repealed)	35 Geo. 3. c. 25	28 April 1795
An act for further continuing an act, made in the thirty-third year of the reign of his present Majesty, intituled, "An act for establishing courts of judicature in the island of Newfoundland, and the islands adjacent." (Note: Courts (Newfoundland) Act 1793 (33 Geo. 3. c. 76)) (Repealed by Statute Law Revision Act 1871 (34 & 35 Vict. c. 116))
Trade with America Act 1795 (repealed)	35 Geo. 3. c. 26	28 April 1795
An act to continue the laws now in force for regulating the trade between the subjects of his Majesty's dominions and the inhabitants of the territories belonging to the united states of America, so far as the same relate to the trade and commerce carried on between this kingdom and the inhabitants of the countries belonging to the said united states. (Repealed by Statute Law Revision Act 1871 (34 & 35 Vict. c. 116))
City of London Militia Act 1795 (repealed)	35 Geo. 3. c. 27	28 April 1795
An act for altering, amending, and rendering more effectual, an act, made in the last session of parliament, (Note: City of London Militia Act 1794 (34 Geo. 3. c. 81)) intituled, "An act for amending so much of an act, passed in the thirteenth and fourteenth years (Note: City of London Militia Act 1662 (14 Cha. 2. c. 3)) of the reign of his late majesty King Charles the Second, intituled, 'An act for ordering the forces in the Several counties of this kingdom,' as relates to the militia of the city of London, and for the better ordering the same." (Repealed by London Militia Act 1796 (36 Geo. 3. c. 92))
Navy and Marines Act 1795 (repealed)	35 Geo. 3. c. 28	28 April 1795
An act to enable petty officers in the navy, and seamen, non-commissioned officers of marines, and marines, serving in his Majesty's navy, to allot part of their pay for the maintenance of their wives and families. (Repealed by Pay of the Navy Act 1830 (11 Geo. 4 & 1 Will. 4. c. 20))
Manning of the Navy (No. 4) Act 1795 (repealed)	35 Geo. 3. c. 29	28 April 1795
An act for raising a certain number of men, in the several counties, stewartries, royal burghs, and towns, in that part of Great Britain catted Scotland, for the service of his Majesty's navy. (Repealed by Statute Law Revision Act 1871 (34 & 35 Vict. c. 116))
Stamps Act 1795 (repealed)	35 Geo. 3. c. 30	28 April 1795
An act for granting to his Majesty several additional duties on stamped vellum, parchment, and paper; and for repealing a certain exception as far as relates to bonds given as security for the payment of one hundred pounds or under, contained in an act of the twenty-third year of his present Majesty's reign. (Note: Stamp Duties (No. 2) Act 1783 (23 Geo. 3. c. 58)) (Repealed by Statute Law Revision Act 1861 (24 & 25 Vict. c. 101))
Smuggling, etc. Act 1795 (repealed)	35 Geo. 3. c. 31	28 April 1795
An act for extending the provisions of an act, made in the thirty-fourth year of the reign of his present majesty, (Note: Importation Act 1794 (34 Geo. 3. c. 50)) to cutters, luggers, shallops, wherries, smacks, or yawls, of any built whatever; for amending an act, made in the twenty-eighth year of the reign of his present Majesty, (Note: Quarantine and Customs Act 1788 (28 Geo. 3. c. 34)) more effectually to secure the performance of quarantine, and for amending several laws relative to the revenue of customs; for amending an act, made in the thirty-third year of the reign of his present Majesty, intituled, "An act for the relief of the captors of prizes, with respect to the bringing and landing certain prize goods in this kingdom;" (Note: Prize Act 1793 (33 Geo. 3. c. 34)) and for authorising the commissioners of excise at Edinburgh to grant licences to manufacturers and dealers in tobacco and snuff, within the limits of the chief office of excise at Edinburgh. (Repealed by Statute Law Revision Act 1861 (24 & 25 Vict. c. 101))
National Debt (No. 3) Act 1795 (repealed)	35 Geo. 3. c. 32	28 April 1795
An Act for granting annuities to satisfy certain navy and bills. (Repealed by Statute Law Revision Act 1870 (33 & 34 Vict. c. 69))
Militia Pay Act 1795 (repealed)	35 Geo. 3. c. 33	28 April 1795
An act for defraying the charge of the pay and cloathing of the militia, in that part of Great Britain called England, for one year, beginning the twenty-fifth day of March one thousand seven hundred and ninety-five. (Repealed by Statute Law Revision Act 1871 (34 & 35 Vict. c. 116))
Manning of the Navy (No. 5) Act 1795 (repealed)	35 Geo. 3. c. 34	28 April 1795
An act for enabling the magistrates, in the several counties in Great Britain, to raise and levy, under certain regulations, such able bodied and idle persons as shall be found within the said counties, to serve in his Majesty's navy. (Repealed by Statute Law Revision Act 1871 (34 & 35 Vict. c. 116))
Militia Allowance Act 1795 (repealed)	35 Geo. 3. c. 35	28 April 1795
An Act for making allowances in certain cases to subaltern officers of the militia in time of peace. (Repealed by Statute Law Revision Act 1871 (34 & 35 Vict. c. 116))
Lottery Act 1795 (repealed)	35 Geo. 3. c. 36	28 April 1795
An Act for granting to his Majesty a certain sum of money be raised by a lottery. (Repealed by Statute Law Revision Act 1871 (34 & 35 Vict. c. 116))
Loans or Exchequer Bills (No. 3) Act 1795 (repealed)	35 Geo. 3. c. 37	28 April 1795
An Act or enabling his Majesty to raise the sum of five hundred thousand pounds for the uses and mentioned. (Repealed by Statute Law Revision Act 1871 (34 & 35 Vict. c. 116))
Continuance of Laws Act 1795 (repealed)	35 Geo. 3. c. 38	28 April 1795
An act to continue several laws relating to the granting a bounty on certain species of British and Irish linens exported, and taking off the duties on the importation of foreign raw linen yarns made of flax; (Note: Exportation Act 1756 (29 Geo. 2. c. 15)) to the discontinuing the duties payable on the importation of tallow, hogs lard, and grease; (Note: Importation (No. 6) Act 1766 (7 Geo. 3. c. 12)) and to the prohibiting the importation of foreign wrought silks and velvets; (Note: Importation, etc. Act 1766 (6 Geo. 3. c. 28)) and for making perpetual an act, made in the twenty-fifth year of the reign of his present Majesty, to prohibit the exportation of tools and utensils made use of in the iron and steel manufactures of this kingdom; (Note: Exportation Act (No. 2) 1785 (25 Geo. 3. c. 67)) and to prevent the seducing of artificers or workmen employed in those manufactures to go into parts beyond the seas. (Repealed by Statute Law Revision Act 1861 (24 & 25 Vict. c. 101))
Drawback of Duties Act 1795 (repealed)	35 Geo. 3. c. 39	28 April 1795
An act for allowing a drawback of the duties upon coals used in carrying on the Pennygored works, in the county of Pembroke. (Repealed by Customs Law Repeal Act 1825 (6 Geo. 4. c. 105))
Crown Lands in Northamptonshire, Grant to Earl of Upper Ossory Act 1795 (repealed)	35 Geo. 3. c. 40	28 April 1795
An act to enable his Majesty to grant to the right honourable John earl of Upper Ossory in the kingdom of Ireland, baron Upper Ossory of Ampthill, in the county of Bedford, his heirs and assigns, in fee simple all the estate, right, title, and interest remaining in his Majesty, in and upon the haye or walk of Farming Woods, in the forest of Rockingham, in the county of Northampton, and also the reversion of certain offices, rents, and other hereditaments in the said county of Northampton, to which the said earl of Upper Ossory it entitled for three lives, under a grant from his present Majesty, upon a full and adequate confederation to be paid for the same. (Repealed by Statute Law (Repeals) Act 1978 (c. 45))
Aberdeen Harbour Act 1795 (repealed)	35 Geo. 3. c. 41	28 April 1795
An act to continue the term, and alter and enlarge the powers, of an act made in the thirteenth year of the reign of his present Majesty, intituled, "An act for deepening, cleansing, and making more commodious the harbour of Aberdeen; for erecting new piers and quays therein; and for regulating ships and vessels trading into and going out of, the said harbour." (Note: Aberdeen Harbour Act 1772 (13 Geo. 3. c. 29)) (Repealed by Aberdeen Harbour Act 1829 (10 Geo. 4. c. xxxiv))
Montrose Beer Duties Act 1795 (repealed)	35 Geo. 3. c. 42	28 April 1795
An act for enlarging the term and powers of three several acts, made in the sixth year of the reign of his majesty King George the First, in the seventh year of the reign of his late Majesty, (Note: Montrose Beer Duties Act 1733 (7 Geo. 2. c. 5)) and in the ninth year of the reign of his present Majesty, (Note: Montrose Beer Duties Act 1769 (9 Geo. 3. c. 57)) for laying a duty of two pennies Scots, or one sixth part of a penny sterling, upon every pint of ale, or beer, vended or fold within the town of Montrose and privileges thereof, for supplying the said town with fresh water, and for other purposes therein mentioned. (Repealed by Statute Law Revision Act 1948 (11 & 12 Geo. 6. c. 62))
Grand Junction Canal (No. 2) Act 1795	35 Geo. 3. c. 43	28 April 1795
An Act for making a navigable Cut from the Grand Junction Canal, in the precinct of Norwood, in the county of Middlesex, to Paddington, in the said county.
Bridgwater Canal Act 1795	35 Geo. 3. c. 44	28 April 1795
An act to enable the most noble Francis duke of Bridgewater to make a navigable cut from his present navigation in the township of Worsley, in the county palatine of Lancaster, to the township of Pennington, near the town of Leigh, in the said county.
Finsbury Square (Paving, Watching, etc.) Act 1795 (repealed)	35 Geo. 3. c. 45	28 April 1795
An act to explain, amend, and render more effectual an act, made and passed in the thirty-first year of the reign of his present Majesty, intituled, "An act for paving, lighting, watching, cleansing, watering, repairing, and keeping in repair, Finsbury Square, in the parish of Saint Luke, in the county of Middlesex, and part of the manor of Finsbury, and certain other streets and places communicating with or near to the said square; and for preventing or removing nuisances and annoyances within the same." (Note: Finsbury Square Act 1791 (31 Geo. 3. c. 90)) (Repealed by Statute Law Revision Act 1948 (11 & 12 Geo. 6. c. 62))
Hull Improvement Act 1795	35 Geo. 3. c. 46	28 April 1795
An act for laying out and making a new street from Whitefriar-gate to the south end of Quay-street, within the town and county of the town of Kingston-upon-Hull.
Haydon Chapel, Northumberland Act 1795	35 Geo. 3. c. 47	28 April 1795
An act for taking down the chapel of the chapelry of Haydon, in the parish of Warden, in the county of Northumberland, and for building a new chapel, in a convenient situation within the said chapelry.
Isle of Ely Drainage Act 1795	35 Geo. 3. c. 48	28 April 1795
An act for amending two acts of the thirtieth year of King George the Second, (Note: March, Cambridge, Isle of Ely Drainage Act 1757 (30 Geo. 2. c. 36)) and the thirty-second year of his present Majesty, (Note: Isle of Ely Drainage Act 1792 (32 Geo. 3. c. 108)) so far as relates to the draining and preferring certain fen lands and low grounds within the township or hamlet of March, in the Isle of Ely, and county of Cambridge.
Duty on Hair Powder Act 1795 (repealed)	35 Geo. 3. c. 49	30 April 1795
An act for granting to his Majesty a duty on certificates issued for using hair powder. (Repealed by Statute Law Revision Act 1861 (24 & 25 Vict. c. 101))
Indemnity Act 1795 (repealed)	35 Geo. 3. c. 50	30 April 1795
An act to indemnify such persons as have omitted to qualify themselves for offices and employments; and to indemnify justices of the peace or others, who have omitted to register or deliver in their qualifications within the time limited by law, and for giving further time for those purposes; and to indemnify members and officers, in cities, corporations, and borough towns, whose admissions have been omitted to be stamped according to law, or having been stamped, have been lost or mislaid, and for allowing them time to provide admissions duly stamped; to give further time to such persons as have omitted to make and file affidavits of the execution of indentures of clerks to attornies and solicitors; for indemnifying deputy lieutenants and officers of the militia, who have neglected to transmit descriptions of their qualifications to the clerks of the peace within the time limited by law, and for allowing further time for that purpose; and for giving further time to such persons as have omitted to pay the duties on the indentures and contorts of clerks, apprentices or servants. (Repealed by Promissory Oaths Act 1871 (34 & 35 Vict. c. 48))
Southampton to New Sarum Canal Act 1795	35 Geo. 3. c. 51	30 April 1795
An act for making and maintaining a navigable canal from the town and county of the town of Southampton to the city of New Sarum in the county of Wilts, with a collateral branch to Northam within the liberties of the town of Southampton.
Wilts and Berks Canal Act 1795 or the Abingdon to Trowbridge Canal Act 1795 (repealed)	35 Geo. 3. c. 52	30 April 1795
An Act for making and maintaining a navigable canal from the river Thames or Isis, at or near the town of Abingdon, in the county of Berks, to join or communicate with the Kennet and Avon canal, at or near the town of Trowbridge, in the county of Wilts; and also certain navigable cuts therein described. (Repealed by Wilts and Berks Canal Act 1810 (50 Geo. 3. c. cxlviii), Wilts and Berks Canal Navigation Act 1813 (53 Geo. 3. c. cxx) and Wilts and Berks Canal Navigation Act 1821 (1 & 2 Geo. 4. c. xcvii))
Postage Act 1795 (repealed)	35 Geo. 3. c. 53	5 May 1795
An act for further regulating the sending and receiving letters free from the duty of postage; for allowing non-commissioned officers, seamen, and private men, in the navy and army, whilst on service, to send and receive letters at a low rate of postage; and for permitting patterns and samples of goods to be transmitted by the poll at on easier rate than is now allowed by law. (Repealed by Post Office (Repeal of Laws) Act 1837 (7 Will. 4 & 1 Vict. c. 32))
Mackerel Fishery Act 1795 (repealed)	35 Geo. 3. c. 54	5 May 1795
An act for the encouragement of the mackerel fishery. (Repealed by Sea Fisheries Act 1868 (31 & 32 Vict. c. 45))
Stamps (No. 2) Act 1795 (repealed)	35 Geo. 3. c. 55	5 May 1795
An act for granting to his Majesty certain additional duties on receipts. (Repealed by Inland Revenue Repeal Act 1870 (33 & 34 Vict. c. 99))
British Fisheries Act 1795 (repealed)	35 Geo. 3. c. 56	5 May 1795
An act to continue and amend an act, made in the twenty-sixth year the reign of his present Majesty, intituled, "An act for the most effectual encouragement of the British fisheries." (Note: Fisheries (No. 2) Act 1786 (26 Geo. 3. c. 81)) (Repealed by Sea Fisheries Act 1868 (31 & 32 Vict. c. 45))
Indemnity to Certain Governors, etc. Act 1795 (repealed)	35 Geo. 3. c. 57	5 May 1795
An act to indemnify governors, lieutenant governors, and persons acting as such, in the West India islands, who have permitted the importation and exportation of goods and commodities in foreign bottoms. (Repealed by Statute Law Revision Act 1871 (34 & 35 Vict. c. 116))
Registry of Boats, etc. Act 1795 (repealed)	35 Geo. 3. c. 58	5 May 1795
An act for requiring all boats, barges, and other vessels, of certain descriptions, used on navigable rivers, and on inland navigations, in Great Britain, to be registered. (Repealed by Statute Law Revision Act 1871 (34 & 35 Vict. c. 116))
Duties on Scotch Distilleries Act 1795 (repealed)	35 Geo. 3. c. 59	5 May 1795
An act for granting to his Majesty additional duties on distilleries in Scotland, and on the exportation of British-made spirits from England to Scotland, and from Scotland to England; and to amend an act made in the thirty-third year of the reign of his present Majesty, intituled, "An act for the regulation of distilleries in Scotland, and the exportation of British-made spirits from England to Scotland and from Scotland to England, for a limited time." (Note: Distilleries, etc. (Scotland) Act 1793 (33 Geo. 3. c. 61)) (Repealed by Statute Law Revision Act 1861 (24 & 25 Vict. c. 101))
Militia (Staffordshire) Act 1795 (repealed)	35 Geo. 3. c. 60	5 May 1795
An act for applying certain sums of money raised in the county of Stafford by virtue of several acts of parliament made respecting the militia of this kingdom. (Repealed by Statute Law Revision Act 1871 (34 & 35 Vict. c. 116))
Bishopsgate Poor Relief Act 1795 (repealed)	35 Geo. 3. c. 61	5 May 1795
An act for repealing an act, passed in the twelfth year of the reign of his present Majesty, intituled, "An act for the more effectual assessing and collecting of the rates for the relief of the poor in the parish of Saint Botolph Bishopsgate, in the liberties of the city of London;" (Note: St. Botolph, Bishopsgate (Poor Relief) Act 1772 (12 Geo. 3. c. 79)) for providing a workhouse for the reception of the poor of the said parish; and for the employment, maintenance, and regulation, of the said poor therein. (Repealed by Statute Law (Repeals) Act 2013 (c. 2))
Post Office Act 1795 (repealed)	35 Geo. 3. c. 62	19 May 1795
An act to enable his Majesty's postmaster general to open and return certain letters contained in the mails made up at the general post office in London, for the United Provinces, on the thirteenth, sixteenth, and twentieth days of January one thousand seven hundred and ninety-five, and now remaining in the said general post office. (Repealed by Statute Law Revision Act 1871 (34 & 35 Vict. c. 116))
Stamps (No. 3) Act 1795 (repealed)	35 Geo. 3. c. 63	19 May 1795
An act for granting to his Majesty certain stamp duties on sea insurances. (Repealed by Customs and Inland Revenue Act 1867 (30 & 31 Vict. c. 23))
Quartering of Soldiers Act 1795 (repealed)	35 Geo. 3. c. 64	19 May 1795
An act for encreasing the rates of subsistence to he paid to innkeepers and others on quartering soldiers, for a limited time. (Repealed by Statute Law Revision Act 1871 (34 & 35 Vict. c. 116))
Parliamentary Elections Act 1795 (repealed)	35 Geo. 3. c. 65	19 May 1795
An act to prevent unnecessary delay in the execution of writs, for the election of members to serve in parliament for that part of Great Britain called Scotland. (Repealed by Statute Law Revision Act 1871 (34 & 35 Vict. c. 116))
National Debt (No. 4) Act 1795 (repealed)	35 Geo. 3. c. 66	19 May 1795
An act for making part of certain principal sums or stock and annuities raised or created, or to be raised or created, by the parliament of the kingdom of Ireland, on loans, for the use of the government of that kingdom, transferable, and the dividends on such stock and annuities payable, at the bank of England; and for the better security of the proprietors of such stocks and annuities, and of the governor and company of the bank of England. (Repealed by Statute Law Revision Act 1870 (33 & 34 Vict. c. 69))
Bigamy Act 1795 (repealed)	35 Geo. 3. c. 67	19 May 1795
An act for rendering more effectual an act, passed in the first year of the reign of King James the First, intituled, "An act to restrain all persons from marriage until their former wives and former husbands be dead." (Note: Bigamy Act 1603 (1 Jas. 1. c. 11)) (Repealed for England and Wales by Offences Against the Person Act 1828 (9 Geo. 4. c. 31) and for India by Criminal Law (India) Act 1828 (9 Geo. 4. c. 74))
Conway's Patent Kiln Act 1795 (repealed)	35 Geo. 3. c. 68	19 May 1795
An act for vesting, for a certain term of years, in the right honourable Henry Seymour Conway, his executors, administrators, and assigns, the sole property of a kiln or oven, by him invented, for burning lime, and for the use of distillers and brewers, and for other beneficial purposes. (Repealed by Statute Law Revision Act 1948 (11 & 12 Geo. 6. c. 62))
Crown Lands (Forfeited Estates) Act 1795 (repealed)	35 Geo. 3. c. 69	19 May 1795
An act for repealing so much of an act, made in the twenty-fourth year of the reign of his prefect Majesty, (Note: Crown Lands (Forfeited Estates) Act 1784 (24 Geo. 3. Sess. 2. c. 57)) intituled, "An act to enable his Majesty to grant to the heirs of the former proprietors, upon certain terms and conditions, the forfeited estates in Scotland, which were put under the management of a board of trustees by an act passed in the twenty-fifth year of the reign of his late majesty King George the Second, (Note: Crown Lands (Forfeited Estates) Act 1751 (25 Geo. 2. c. 41)) and to repeal the said act as relates to the amount of the debt charged upon the lands and estate which became forfeited by the attainder of Evan Macpherson, late of Cluny. (Repealed by Statute Law Revision Act 1948 (11 & 12 Geo. 6. c. 62))
Saint John's Church, Hackney Act 1795	35 Geo. 3. c. 70	19 May 1795
An act for amending an act, passed in the thirtieth year of the reign of his present Majesty, intituled, "An act for taking down the church and tower belonging to the parish of Saint John at Hackney, in the county of Middlesex; and for building another church and tower for the use of the said parish; and for making an additional cemetry or churchyard;" (Note: Saint John Church, Hackney Act 1790 (30 Geo. 3. c. 71)) and for raising a further sum of money for completing the said church, and other works.
Halifax Church Act 1795	35 Geo. 3. c. 71	19 May 1795
An act for building a new church or chapel (Note: Holy Trinity Church, Halifax.) in the town of Halifax, in the west riding of the county of York.
Lapworth to Kingswood Canal Act 1795	35 Geo. 3. c. 72	19 May 1795
An act for making a navigable cut from Stratford-upon-Avon canal, in the parish of Lapworth, into the Warwick and Birmingham canal, in the manor of Kingswood, in the county of Warwick.
Saint Marylebone Improvement Act 1795 (repealed)	35 Geo. 3. c. 73	19 May 1795
An act for repealing several acts, made in the eighth, (Note: Marylebone Improvement Act 1768 (8 Geo. 3. c. 46)) tenth, (Note: Saint Marylebone (Improvement) Act 1770 (10 Geo. 3. c. 23)) thirteenth, (Note: Saint Marylebone (Streets) Act 1772 (13 Geo. 3. c. 48)) and fifteenth (Note: Saint Marylebone (Poor Relief) Act 1775 (15 Geo. 3. c. 21)) years of the reign of his present Majesty, for regulating the nightly watch and beadles, and for paving, repairing, cleansing, and lighting the parish of Saint Mary-le-bone in the county of Middlesex, and for the better relief and maintenance of the poor thereof, and for divers other purposes therein mentioned; and for making more effectual provision for those purposes. (Repealed by St. Marylebone Improvement Act 1813 (53 Geo. 3. c. clxiii), Metropolis Roads Act 1829 (10 Geo. 4. c. 59) and London Government (Borough of St. Marylebone) Order in Council 1901 (SR&O 1901/272))
Kensington Improvement Act 1795 (repealed)	35 Geo. 3. c. 74	19 May 1795
An act for keeping in repair the footways in the High-street of the town of Kensington, in the county of Middlesex, and for lighting and watching the said street, and also certain courts and alleys communicating therewith, and for removing and preventing encroachments, nuisances and annoyances therein. (Repealed by Kensington Improvement Act 1851 (14 & 15 Vict. c. cxvi))
Wallingford Improvement Act 1795 (repealed)	35 Geo. 3. c. 75	19 May 1795
An act for paving the footways, and for cleansing, lighting, watching, and regulating, the streets, lanes, passages, and places, within the borough of Wallingford, in the county of Berks, and for removing and preventing nuisances, annoyances, encroachments, and obstructions therein. (Repealed by Local Government Supplemental Act 1865 (28 & 29 Vict. c. 24))
Aberdeen Improvements Act 1795 (repealed)	35 Geo. 3. c. 76	19 May 1795
An Act for the better paving, lighting, cleansing, and otherwise improving the streets, lanes and other public passages of the City of Aberdeen, and the roads and avenues within the Royalty thereof; for the better supplying the inhabitants with fresh water; and for the removing and preventing all obstructions and annoyances within the said City and Royalty. (Repealed by Statute Law (Repeals) Act 1977 (c. 18))
Eau Brink Act 1795 or the River Ouse Navigation Act 1795	35 Geo. 3. c. 77	19 May 1795
An act for improving the drainage of the Middle and South Levels, part of the great level of the fens, called Bedford Level, and the low lands adjoining or near to the river Ouze, in the county of Norfolk, draining through the same to sea by the harbour of King's Lynn, in the said county; and for altering and improving the navigation of the said river Ouze, from or near a place called Eau Brink, (Note: Eau Brink is near to Wiggenhall St Germans, Norfolk, on the River Great Ouse.) in the parish of Wiggenhall Saint Mary, in the said county, to the said harbour of King's Lynn; and for improving and preserving the navigation of the several rivers communicating with the said river Ouze.
Bewdley Bridge Act 1795	35 Geo. 3. c. 78	19 May 1795
An act for building a bridge over the river Severn, at Bewdley, in the county of Worcester, and for opening convenient avenues thereto.
Henley Improvement Act 1795	35 Geo. 3. c. 79	19 May 1795
An act for amending an act, passed in the twenty-first year of the reign of his present Majesty, intituled, "An act for building a bridge over the river Thames, at the town of Henley-upon-Thames, in the county of Oxford, and making commodious avenues thereto; for widening some part of the high-street, and the market-place; for lighting and watching; for regulating the footways in, and removing nuisances, obstructions, and annoyances from, the said town," (Note: Henley Bridge Act 1781 (21 Geo. 3. c. 33)) so far as the same relates to widening some part of the high street and market place, for lighting and watching, for regulating the footways in, and removing nuisances, obstructions, and annoyances from, the said town.
Shipping Act 1795 (repealed)	35 Geo. 3. c. 80	22 May 1795
An act to make further provision respecting ships and effects come into this kingdom to, take the benefit of his Majesty's orders in council of the sixteenth and twenty-first days of January one thousand seven hundred and ninety-five; and to provide for the disposal of other ships and effects detained in, or brought into, the ports of this kingdom. (Repealed by Goods in Neutral Ships Act 1802 (42 Geo. 3. c. 80))
Families of Militiamen Act 1795 (repealed)	35 Geo. 3. c. 81	22 May 1795
An act to apportion the relief, by the several statutes now in force directed to be given to the families of non-commissioned officers, drummers, fifers, and privates, serving in the militia, between the county at large and the peculiar districts therein not contributing to the county rate, according to the number of men serving for each in such militia; and to remove certain difficulties in respect to the relief of families of substitutes, hired men, or volunteers, serving tn the militia. (Repealed by Relief of Families of Militiamen Act 1803 (43 Geo. 3. c. 47))
Gainsborough Inclosure, etc. Act 1795	35 Geo. 3. c. 82	22 May 1795
An act for enclosing, dividing, allotting, draining, embanking, and improving the open and common fields, meadows, pastures, commons, wastes, and other uninclosed grounds, within the township of Gainsburgh, in the parish of Gainsburgh, in the county of Lincoln; and also for making a compensation for the tythes arising within the said township, and within the lordship of Thonock, in the said parish.
Artillery Corps, etc. Act 1795 (repealed)	35 Geo. 3. c. 83	2 June 1795
An act for augmenting the royal corps of artillery, and providing seafaring men for the service of the navy, out of the private men now serving in the militia, and to amend an act, passed in the twenty-sixth year of the reign of his present Majesty, intituled, "An act for amending, and reducing into one act of parliament, the laws relating to the militia in that part of Great Britain called England." (Note: Militia Act 1786 (26 Geo. 3. c. 107)) (Repealed by Militia Act 1802 (42 Geo. 3. c. 90))
Thames Ballastage Act 1795 (repealed)	35 Geo. 3. c. 84	2 June 1795
An act for continuing several acts passed for the better regulation of Ullage and ballastage in the river Thames. (Repealed by Thames Lastage and Ballastage Act 1805 (45 Geo. 3. c. xcviii))
Grand Junction Canal (No. 3) Act 1795	35 Geo. 3. c. 85	2 June 1795
An Act for making and extending a navigable Cut from the town of Watford, in the county of Hertford, to the town of St. Alban, in the same county.
River Itchin Navigation Act 1795	35 Geo. 3. c. 86	2 June 1795
An act to explain, amend, and render more effectual, the several acts of the sixteenth and seventeenth of King Charles the Second, (Note: River Navigation Act 1664 (16 & 17 Cha. 2. c. 13 Pr.)) and of the seventh of his present Majesty, (Note: River Itching Navigation Act 1766 (7 Geo. 3. c. 87)) relating to the navigation of the river Itchin, in the county of Southampton, and for improving the navigation thereof, and for ascertaining the rates of carriage, riverage, and wharfage, payable thereon.
Stoke to Newcastle Canal Act 1795	35 Geo. 3. c. 87	2 June 1795
An act for making and maintaining a navigable canal from and out of the navigation from the Trent to the Mercy, at or near Stoke upon Trent, in the county of Stafford, to the town of Newcastle under Lyme, in the said county.
Insolvent Debtor's Discharge Act 1795 (repealed)	35 Geo. 3. c. 88	22 June 1795
An act to remedy certain amissions in an act, passed in the last session of parliament, intituled, "An act for the discharge of certain insolvent debtors." (Note: Insolvent Debtors' Discharge Act 1794 (34 Geo. 3. c. 69)) (Repealed by Statute Law Revision Act 1871 (34 & 35 Vict. c. 116))
Duties on Spirits Act 1795 (repealed)	35 Geo. 3. c. 89	22 June 1795
An act for making perpetual an act made in the thirtieth year of the reign of his present Majesty, (Note: Excise Act 1790 (30 Geo. 3. c. 37)) to discontinue the payment of the duties in Scotland upon low wines and spirits, and upon worts, wash, and other liquors, there used in the distillation of spirits; and for regulating the exportation of British-made spirits from England to Scotland, and from Scotland to England; to continue so much of an act, made in the thirty-third year of the reign of his present Majesty (Note: Excise Act 1793 (33 Geo. 3. c. 59)) as permits sir William Bishop, George Bishop, and Argles Bishop, to carry on the manufacture of Maidstone Geneva; and to make perpetual the duties granted by an act, made in the twenty-seventh year of the reign of his present Majesty, (Note: Customs and Excise Act 1787 (27 Geo. 3. c. 13)) upon worts, wash, and other liquors, for extracting spirits for home consumption. (Repealed by Statute Law Revision Act 1861 (24 & 25 Vict. c. 101))
Slave Trade Act 1795 (repealed)	35 Geo. 3. c. 90	22 June 1795
An act for regulating the shipping and carrying slaves in British vessels from the coast of Africa. (Repealed by Statute Law Revision Act 1871 (34 & 35 Vict. c. 116))
Hawkers and Pedlars Act 1795 (repealed)	35 Geo. 3. c. 91	22 June 1795
An act to amend an act, made in the twenty-ninth year of the reign of his present Majesty, (Note: Duty on Hawkers, etc. Act 1789 (29 Geo. 3. c. 26)) for the better regulation of hawkers, pedlars, and petty chapmen; and for repealing so much of the said act as restrains them from selling goods, wares, or merchandize, within a certain distance from any city or market town. (Repealed by Statute Law Revision Act 1861 (24 & 25 Vict. c. 101))
Southern Whale Fisheries Act 1795 (repealed)	35 Geo. 3. c. 92	22 June 1795
An act for further encouraging and regulating the southern whale fisheries. (Repealed by Customs Law Repeal Act 1825 (6 Geo. 4. c. 105))
Loan to Emperor of Germany Act 1795 (repealed)	35 Geo. 3. c. 93	22 June 1795
An act for guaranteeing the payment of the dividends on a loan of four millions six hundred thousand pounds to the emperor of Germany. (Repealed by Statute Law Revision Act 1861 (24 & 25 Vict. c. 101))
Navy Pay Act 1795 (repealed)	35 Geo. 3. c. 94	22 June 1795
An Act for establishing a more easy and expeditious Method for the punctual and frequent Payment of the Wages and Pay of certain Officers belonging to His Majesty's Navy. (Repealed by Pay of the Navy Act 1830 (11 Geo. 4 & 1 Will. 4. c. 20))
Navy Pay (No. 2) Act 1795 (repealed)	35 Geo. 3. c. 95	22 June 1795
An act to enable boatswains, gunners, and carpenters, serving in hit Majesty's navy, to allot part of their wages or pay for the maintenance of their wives and families. (Repealed by Pay of the Navy Act 1830 (11 Geo. 4 & 1 Will. 4. c. 20))
Relief of Revenue Prisoners Act 1795 (repealed)	35 Geo. 3. c. 96	22 June 1795
An act for the relief of persons detained in gaol for want of bail, in certain cases relating to the publick revenue. (Repealed by Statute Law Revision Act 1861 (24 & 25 Vict. c. 101))
Excise (No. 5) Act 1795 (repealed)	35 Geo. 3. c. 97	22 June 1795
An act to declare that hides and skins tanned by a new method shall be deemed tanned hides and skins within the meaning of the acts relating to the duties of excise on hides and skins tanned in Great Britain. (Repealed by Statute Law Revision Act 1861 (24 & 25 Vict. c. 101))
Drawback Act 1795 (repealed)	35 Geo. 3. c. 98	22 June 1795
An act for allowing further time for the payment of the drawback on China ware, imported by the East India company before the first day of April one thousand seven hundred and ninety-five. (Repealed by Statute Law Revision Act 1871 (34 & 35 Vict. c. 116))
Papists Act 1795 (repealed)	35 Geo. 3. c. 99	22 June 1795
An act for allowing further time for inrolment of deeds and wills made by papists, and for relief of protestant purchasers. (Repealed by Statute Law Revision Act 1871 (34 & 35 Vict. c. 116))
Importation (No. 2) Act 1795 (repealed)	35 Geo. 3. c. 100	22 June 1795
An act for permitting the importation of organized thrown silk, flax, and flax seed, into this kingdom, in ships or vessels belonging to any kingdom or state in amity with his Majesty, for a limited time. (Repealed by Statute Law Revision Act 1871 (34 & 35 Vict. c. 116))
Poor Removal Act 1795 or the Removal Act 1795 (repealed)	35 Geo. 3. c. 101	22 June 1795
An act to prevent the removal of poor persons, until they shall become actually chargeable. (Repealed by Poor Law Act 1927 (17 & 18 Geo. 5. c. 14))
Weights and Measures Act 1795 (repealed)	35 Geo. 3. c. 102	22 June 1795
An Act for the more effectual Prevention of the Use of defective Weights, and of false and unequal Balances. (Repealed by Weights and Measures Act 1878 (17 & 18 Geo. 5. c. 14))
Painshill Estate Act 1795 or the Estate of Benjamin Hopkins Act 1795 (repealed)	35 Geo. 3. c. 103	22 June 1795
An act to enable his Majesty to grant the inheritance of certain lands or grounds, situate at or near Painshill, in the several parishes of Cobham, Walton, and Wisley, in the county of Surrey, to George Chamberlaine, esq; George Bond, esq; one of his Majesty's serjeants at law, and sir Samuel Hayes, bart. of the kingdom of Ireland, upon the trusts declared by the will of Benjamin Bond Hopkins, esq; deceased, of and concerning his estate at Painshill aforesaid. (Repealed by Statute Law (Repeals) Act 1989 (c. 43))
London and Hertford Hospitals Act 1795	35 Geo. 3. c. 104	22 June 1795
An act for enabling the mayor and commonalty and citizens of the city of London, governors of the possessions, revenues, and goods, of the hospital of Edward King of England the Sixth, of Christ, Bridewell, and St. Thomas the Apostle, and other the governors of Christ's Hospitals, to purchase houses and ground for enlarging Christ's Hospitals in London and at Hertford, and erecting additional buildings thereto, and for other purposes.
River Ivel Navigation Act 1795	35 Geo. 3. c. 105	22 June 1795
An act for improving and supporting the navigation of the river Ivel, otherwise Yeo, from the town of Ivelchester, to Bicknell Bridge, in the parish of Huish Episcopi, in the county of Somerset; and for making a navigable cut from thence into a certain drain called Portlake Rhine, in the parish of Langport, in the same county, and for making the said drain navigable from thence to the river Parrett, below Great Bow Bridge, in the town of Langport.
Thames and Isis Navigation Act 1795 (repealed)	35 Geo. 3. c. 106	22 June 1795
An act for amending and rendering more effectual an act, passed in the twenty-eighth year of the reign of his present Majesty, (Note: Thames Navigation Act 1788 (28 Geo. 3. c. 51)) intituled, "An act to explain, amend, and enlarge, the powers of so much of two acts, passed in the eleventh (Note: Thames and Isis Navigation Act 1771 (11 Geo. 3. c. 45)) and fifteenth (Note: Thames Conservancy Act 1775 (15 Geo. 3. c. 11)) years of the reign of his present Majesty, for improving and completing the navigation of the rivers Thames and Isis, from the city of London to the town of Cricklade, in the county of Wilts, as relates to the navigation of the said rivers, from the boundary of the jurisdiction of the city of London, near Staines, in the county of Middlesex, to the said town of Cricklade;" and for extending and enlarging the powers of the said several acts, passed in the eleventh and fifteenth years of the reign of his said present Majesty, so far as the same relate to the improving and completing of the navigation of the said rivers, from the jurisdiction of the city of London, near Staines, in the county of Middlesex, to the town to Cricklade, in the county of Wilts. (Repealed by Thames Conservancy Act 1894 (57 & 58 Vict. c. clxxxvii))
Isle of Axholme Inclosure, etc. Act 1795	35 Geo. 3. c. 107	22 June 1795
An act for dividing, allotting, inclosing, draining, and improving, the commons and waste grounds within the several parishes of Epworth, Haxey, Belton, and Owfton, in the isle of Axholme, in the county of Lincoln; and also for making a compensation for the tythes arising from the said commons, and from certain other lands within the said parishes.
Redstone Bridge, Severn Act 1795 (repealed)	35 Geo. 3. c. 108	22 June 1795
An act for amending an act, passed in the thirteenth year of the reign of his present Majesty, intituled, "An act for building a bridge across the river Severn, near Redstone, in the county of Worcester, and for making proper avenues and roads to and from the same; and for making satisfaction to the proprietors of a ferry across the said river at Redstone aforesaid;" (Note: Redstone Bridge, Severn Act 1773 (13 Geo. 3. c. 113)) and enabling the trustees for executing the said act to rebuild the said bridge. (Repealed by Stourport Bridge Transfer Act 1892 (55 & 56 Vict. c. xxiii))
Carriage Duties Act 1795 (repealed)	35 Geo. 3. c. 109	26 June 1795
An act for repealing so much of an act of parliament, passed in the twenty-ninth year of the reign of his present Majesty, intituled, "An act for granting to his Majesty several additional rates and duties upon horses, and carriages with four wheels; and for explaining and amending an act, passed in the twenty-fifth year of his present Majesty, (Note: Excise (No. 2) Act 1785 (25 Geo. 3. c. 47)) as far as relates to certain arrives with two or three wheels, therein mentioned," (Note: Duties on Horses and Carriage Act 1789 (29 Geo. 3. c. 49)) as relates to the additional duties upon coaches with four wheels used as stage coaches; and for reducing the duties upon carriages with less than four wheels, mostly used in the affairs of husbandry, or for the purpose of trade. (Repealed by Statute Law Revision Act 1861 (24 & 25 Vict. c. 101))
Drawback (No. 2) Act 1795 (repealed)	35 Geo. 3. c. 110	26 June 1795
An act to amend an act, made in the thirty-second year of the reign of his present Majesty, (Note: Customs (No. 2) Act 1792 (32 Geo. 3. c. 43)) intituled, "An act for regulating the allowance of the drawback, and payment of the bounty, on the exportation of sugar; and for permitting the importation of sugar and coffee into the Bahama and Bermuda islands in foreign ships;" and for reducing the bounty on refined sugars exported in any other than British ships. (Repealed by Statute Law Revision Act 1861 (24 & 25 Vict. c. 101))
Friendly Societies Act 1795 (repealed)	35 Geo. 3. c. 111	26 June 1795
An act for more effectually carrying into execution an act, made in the thirty-third year of the reign of his present Majesty, (Note: Friendly Societies Act 1793 (33 Geo. 3. c. 54)) intituled, "An act for the encouragement and relief of friendly societies; and for extending so much of the powers thereof as relates to the framing rules and regulations for the better management of the funds of such societies, and the appointment of treasurers to other institutions of a charitable nature. (Repealed by Friendly Societies Act 1855 (18 & 19 Vict. c. 63))
Hair Powder Certificates, etc. Act 1795 (repealed)	35 Geo. 3. c. 112	26 June 1795
An act for allowing further time for persons to take out certificates for using or wearing hair powder, in pursuance of an act of this present session of parliament, intituled, "An act for granting to his Majesty duty on certificates issued for using hair powder;" (Note: Duty on Hair Powder Act 1795 (35 Geo. 3. c. 49)) and also further time for the admeasurement and registering of boats, barges, and other vessels, in pursuance of another act of the same session, intituled, "An act for requiring all boats, barges, and other vessels, of certain descriptions, used on navigable rivers, and on inland navigations, in Great Britain, to be registered." (Note: Registry of Boats, etc. Act 1795 (35 Geo. 3. c. 58)) (Repealed by Statute Law Revision Act 1871 (34 & 35 Vict. c. 116))
Sale of Beer Act 1795 (repealed)	35 Geo. 3. c. 113	26 June 1795
An act for the more effectual prevention of selling ale and other liquors by persons not duly licensed. (Repealed by Licensing Act 1953 (1 & 2 Eliz. 2. c. 46))
Duties on Glass Act 1795 (repealed)	35 Geo. 3. c. 114	26 June 1795
An act for better securing the duties on glass. (Repealed by Glass Duties Act 1838 (1 & 2 Vict. c. 44))
Importation (No. 3) Act 1795 (repealed)	35 Geo. 3. c. 115	26 June 1795
An act for allowing, for a limited time, the importation of goods from India and China, and other parts within the limits of the exclusive trade of the East India company, in ships not of British-built, nor registered as such; and for the exportation of goods from Great Britain by the same ships, under certain restrictions. (Repealed by Statute Law Revision Act 1871 (34 & 35 Vict. c. 116))
Excise (No. 6) Act 1795 (repealed)	35 Geo. 3. c. 116	26 June 1795
An act to remove doubts arising from the construction of certain acts of this session of parliament respecting the duties of excise therein granted on wash, coffee, cocoa nuts, foreign spirits, wine, and sweets. (Repealed by Statute Law Revision Act 1871 (34 & 35 Vict. c. 116))
Importation (No. 4) Act 1795 (repealed)	35 Geo. 3. c. 117	26 June 1795
An act for allowing the importation of rape seed, and other seeds used for extracting oil, from any country whatever, whenever the prices of middling British rape seed shall be above a certain limit. (Repealed by Statute Law Revision Act 1861 (24 & 25 Vict. c. 101))
Warehousing of Wines, etc. Act 1795 (repealed)	35 Geo. 3. c. 118	26 June 1795
An act for charging warehouse rent on wines, in certain cases, secured in his Majesty's warehouses; for equalizing the duties on wines exported to India and China; and for providing warehouses for coffee and cocoa nuts imported into this kingdom. (Repealed by Statute Law Revision Act 1861 (24 & 25 Vict. c. 101))
Making of Spirits from Wheat, etc. Act 1795 (repealed)	35 Geo. 3. c. 119	26 June 1795
An act to prohibit, for a limited time, the making of low wines or spirits from wheat, barley, malt, or any other sort of grain, or from any meal, flour, or bran; and for permitting home-made spirits, deposited in the warehouses for exportation, to be taken out for home consumption, on payment of duty. (Repealed by Statute Law Revision Act 1871 (34 & 35 Vict. c. 116))
Appropriation Act 1795 (repealed)	35 Geo. 3. c. 120	26 June 1795
An act for granting to his Majesty a certain sum of money out of the consolidated fund; for the service of the year one thousand seven hundred and ninety-five; and for further appropriating the supplies granted in this session of parliament. (Repealed by Statute Law Revision Act 1871 (34 & 35 Vict. c. 116))
Manning of the Navy (No. 6) Act 1795 (repealed)	35 Geo. 3. c. 121	26 June 1795
An act to explain and amend an act made in the twentieth year of the reign of his present Majesty, (Note: Navy Act 1780 (20 Geo. 3. c. 23)) intituled, "An act to amend an act, made in the last session of parliament, (Note: Navy Act 1779 (19 Geo. 3. c. 67)) intituled, 'An act for the encouragement of seamen, and the more speedy and effectual manning his Majesty's navy;' and for making further provisions for those purposes;" and also an act made in the twenty-first year of the reign of his present Majesty, intituled, "An act for the encouragement of seamen, and the more speedy and effectual manning his Majesty's navy;" (Note: Navy Act 1781 (21 Geo. 3. c. 15)) and for the better encouragement of seamen for his Majesty's navy. (Repealed by Naval Prize Acts Repeal Act 1864 (27 & 28 Vict. c. 23))
Burghs of Barony (Scotland) Act 1795 (repealed)	35 Geo. 3. c. 122	26 June 1795
An act to enable his Majesty, under certain regulations, to erect independent burghs of barony in that part of Great Britain called Scotland; and for removing certain difficulties as to the granting of leases in towns and villages on the fishing coasts of that kingdom. (Repealed by Abolition of Feudal Tenure etc. (Scotland) Act 2000 (asp 5))
Small Debts (Scotland) Act 1795 (repealed)	35 Geo. 3. c. 123	26 June 1795
An act for the more easy and expeditious recovery of small debts, and determining small causes, arising out of personal contract or obligation, in that part of Great Britain called Scotland. (Repealed by Statute Law Revision Act 1871 (34 & 35 Vict. c. 116))
Woolcombers Act 1795 (repealed)	35 Geo. 3. c. 124	26 June 1795
An act to enable woolcombers to exercise trades in any town or place in Great Britain. (Repealed by Statute Law Revision Act 1871 (34 & 35 Vict. c. 116))
Heir Apparent's Establishment Act 1795 (repealed)	35 Geo. 3. c. 125	26 June 1795
An act for preventing the accumulation of debts by any future heir apparent of the crown, and for regulating the mode of expenditure from the time when a separate establishment shall be made for such future heir apparent. (Repealed by Statute Law Revision Act 1948 (11 & 12 Geo. 6. c. 62))
Temple Bar, etc. Act 1795	35 Geo. 3. c. 126	26 June 1795
An act for widening and improving the entrance into the city of London near Temple Bar; for making a more commodious street, or passage, at Snow Hill; and for raising, on the credit of the orphans fund, a sum of money for those purposes.
Relief of Traders of Grenada, etc. Act 1795 (repealed)	35 Geo. 3. c. 127	27 June 1795
An act for enabling his Majesty to direct the issue of exchequer bills to a limited amount, for the purposes, and in the manner therein mentioned. (Repealed by Statute Law Revision Act 1871 (34 & 35 Vict. c. 116))
National Debt (No. 5) Act 1795 (repealed)	35 Geo. 3. c. 128	27 June 1795
An act for allowing a further annuity to the subscribers to the sum of eighteen millions, authorised to be raised for the service of the year one thousand seven hundred and ninety-five. (Repealed by Statute Law Revision Act 1870 (33 & 34 Vict. c. 69))
Prince of Wales Act 1795 (repealed)	35 Geo. 3. c. 129	27 June 1795
An act for enabling his Majesty to settle an annuity on his royal highness the prince of Wales, (Note: George Augustus Frederick, Prince of Wales; who became George IV in 1820.) during the joint lives of his Majesty and of his said royal highness; for making provision out of his revenues for the payment of any debts that may be due from his royal highness; for preventing the accumulation of debts in future; and for regulating the mode of expenditure of the said revenues. (Repealed by Statute Law Revision Act 1871 (34 & 35 Vict. c. 116))
Princess of Wales Act 1795 (repealed)	35 Geo. 3. c. 130	27 June 1795
An act for the better enabling his Majesty to make provision for a sure and certain jointure for her royal highness the princess of Wales, for the term of her life. (Repealed by Statute Law Revision Act 1871 (34 & 35 Vict. c. 116))
Blackfriars Sewer Act 1795	35 Geo. 3. c. 131	27 June 1795
An act for repairing the common sewer in New Bridge Street, Black Friars, in the city of London, or making a new fewer instead of the defective part or parts thereof, and for maintaining and cleaning the same.
Yarmouth to Gorleston Road Act 1795 (repealed)	35 Geo. 3. c. 132	13 February 1795
An act for continuing an act of the fifteenth year of his present Majesty, (Note: Yarmouth to Gorleston Road Act 1775 (15 Geo. 3. c. 67)) for amending and widening the read leading from Yarmouth Bridge, through the hamlet of South Town, otherwise Little Yarmouth, to Gorleston, in the county of Suffolk. (Repealed by Yarmouth Bridge and Gorleston Road (Suffolk) Act 1834 (4 & 5 Will. 4. c. xxix))
Worcester Roads Act 1795 (repealed)	35 Geo. 3. c. 133	5 March 1795
An Act to amend and render effectual so much of an Act of the twenty-eighth year of His present Majesty, (Note: Worcester and Warwick Roads Act 1788 (28 Geo. 3. c. 88)) as relates to improving the entrance into the city of Worcester, from the London and Upton roads. (Repealed by Statute Law (Repeals) Act 1998 (c. 43))
Middlesex Roads Act 1795 (repealed)	35 Geo. 3. c. 134	5 March 1795
An Act to continue the term, and enlarge the powers of two acts, made in the seventh (Note: Middlesex Roads Act 1766 (7 Geo. 3. c. 88)) and thirty-first (Note: Brentford Road Act 1791 (31 Geo. 3. c. 124)) years of the reign of his present Majesty, for repairing the highways from that part of Counter's Bridge which lies in the parish of Kensington, in the county of Middlesex, leading through the towns of Brentford and Hounslow, to the powder mills, in the road to Staines; and to Cranford Bridge, in the said county, in the road to Colnbrook; and for repairing, turnings or altering, the highway heading from the said road, at or near the end of Sion Lane, to the town of Isleworth, in the said county, and from thence to a gate on the south side of Teddington Field; and also the highway heading out of the said great road, near Smallberry Green turnpike, to a house known by the sign of The George, to the town of Isleworth aforesaid; and for lighting and watering part of the said highways. (Repealed by Highways from Kensington Act 1813 (53 Geo. 3. c. xc) and Metropolis Roads Act 1826 (7 Geo. 4. c. cxlii))
Keighley to Bradford Road Act 1795 (repealed)	35 Geo. 3. c. 135	16 March 1795
An Act for continuing the term, and altering and enlarging the powers.of certain and for repairing several roads in the weft riding of the county of York, so far as relates to the road from Keighley to Bradford. (Repealed by Road from Keighley to Bradford Act 1815 (55 Geo. 3. c. li))
Wiltshire Roads Act 1795 (repealed)	35 Geo. 3. c. 136	27 March 1795
An Act for repairing and widening the road from Horseley Upright Gate, leading from Bowden Hill, in the county of Wilts, to the top of Kingsdown Hill, in the parish of Box, in the said county, and several other roads near or adjoining thereto. (Repealed by Blue Vein and Bricker's Barn Turnpike Roads (Wiltshire, Somerset) Act 1829 (10 Geo. 4. c. lxxxiii))
Oldham and Saddleworth Roads Act 1795 (repealed)	35 Geo. 3. c. 137	27 March 1795
An Act for making and maintaining a turnpike road from Mumps Brook, within Oldham, in the county palatine of Lancaster, to Ripponden, in the west riding of the county of York; and a branch therefrom, at or near Denshaw, to or near to Brownhill, and another branch therefrom, at or near Grains, to Delphi within Saddleworth, in the said riding. (Repealed by Oldham to Ripponden Road Act 1812 (52 Geo. 3. c. lix))
Preston Candover to Alton Road Act 1795 (repealed)	35 Geo. 3. c. 138	27 March 1795
An Act for repairing and widening the road from Preston Candover to Basingstoke, in the county of Southampton, and from thence to Alton, in the said county. (Repealed by Bagshot and Farnham, and Alton and Winchester Roads Act 1817 (57 Geo. 3. c. xxvi))
Durham Roads Act 1795 (repealed)	35 Geo. 3. c. 139	28 April 1795
An Act for continuing the term, and altering, enlarging, and consolidating the powers of two acts of parliament, passed in the twenty-fourth (Note: Durham Roads Act 1750 (24 Geo. 2. c. 30)) and twenty-ninth (Note: Durham Roads Act 1756 (29 Geo. 2. c. 70)) years of the reign of his late majesty King George the Second, for repairing the high roads from Darlington to West Auckland, in the county of Durham, and several other roads in the same county, therein mentioned. (Repealed by Darlington and West Auckland and Cockerton Bridge and Staindrop Roads Act 1835 (5 & 6 Will. 4. c. xxv))
Gloucester Roads Act 1795 (repealed)	35 Geo. 3. c. 140	28 April 1795
An Act for enlarging the term and powers of several acts, passed in the thirteenth year of the reign of King George the First, (Note: Cirencester Roads Act 1726 (13 Geo. 1. c. 11)) and the fifteenth (Note: Gloucestershire Roads Act 1741 (15 Geo. 2. c. 15)) and thirty-first (Note: Gloucestershire Roads Act 1757 (31 Geo. 2. c. 54)) years of the reign of his late majesty King George the Second, for repairing the road from Cirencester to Saint John's Bridge, in the county of Gloucester, and certain other roads therein mentioned. (Repealed by Cirencester Roads Act 1825 (6 Geo. 4. c. cxliii))
Cirencester to Birdlip Hill Road Act 1795 (repealed)	35 Geo. 3. c. 141	28 April 1795
An act to enlarge the term and powers of two several acts, passed in the twentieth year of the reign of his late majesty King George the Second, (Note: Gloucester Roads Act 1746 (20 Geo. 2. c. 23)) and in the tenth year of the reign of his present Majesty, (Note: Gloucester Roads Act 1770 (10 Geo. 3. c. 74)) for repairing the road from Cirencester, in the county of Gloucester, to Birdlip Hill, in the said county. (Repealed by Cirencester Roads Act 1825 (6 Geo. 4. c. cxliii))
Kensington Road Act 1795 (repealed)	35 Geo. 3. c. 142	28 April 1795
An Act for more effectually repairing the road from Hyde Park Corner to Counter's Bridge, and certain other roads in the county of Middlesex, and for other purposes therein mentioned. (Repealed by Road from Knightsbridge to Counters Bridge Act 1825 (6 Geo. 4. c. clvii))
Ludlow-fach, Llandovery and River Amman Roads Act 1795 (repealed)	35 Geo. 3. c. 143	28 April 1795
An Act for enlarging the term and powers of an act, of the nineteenth year of his present Majesty, (Note: Ludlow-fach, Llandovery and River Amman Roads Act 1779 (19 Geo. 3. c. 102)) for amending, widening, and keeping in repair, the roods leading from Ludlowfach, in the county of Carmarthen, to the town of Llandovery, and from thence, through the town of Llangadock, to the river Amman, and several other roads communicating therewith. (Repealed by Ludlow-fach, Llandovery and River Amman Roads Act 1813 (53 Geo. 3. c. lxiv) and Ludlow-fach, Llandovery and River Amman Roads (Carmarthen and Glamorgan) Act 1831 (1 Will. 4. c. lix))
Lancaster Roads Act 1795 (repealed)	35 Geo. 3. c. 144	28 April 1795
An Act to continue the term, and alter and enlarge the powers, of so much of an act, made in the twenty-ninth year of the reign of his present Majesty, intituled, "An act for amending, widening, turning, varying, altering, and keeping in repair, the road from a certain dwelling house in Bury, now or late in the occupation of William Walker, gentleman, to Haslingden, and from time to the east end of Salford Bridge, in Blackburn; and also the road from Haslingden aforesaid to the east end of Cockshut Bridge, in the town of Walley; and also the road from Haslingden aforesaid, through New Church and Bacup, to Todmorden; and for making a road from the said road between Bury and Haslingden, in the township of Walmersley, to the river Irwell, and for building a bridge over the said river, all in the county palatine of Lancaster," (Note: Lancaster Roads Act 1789 (29 Geo. 3. c. 107)) as relates to the first district of road therein mentioned. (Repealed by Roads from Bury to Blackburn and Branches Act 1827 (7 & 8 Geo. 4. c. xxviii))
Wigan to Preston Road Act 1795 (repealed)	35 Geo. 3. c. 145	28 April 1795
An Act for continuing the term and altering and enlarging the powers of an act of the nineteenth year of his present Majesty, (Note: Wigan to Preston Road Act 1779 (19 Geo. 3. c. 92)) for more effectually repairing, widening, and amending, the roads from Wigan to Preston, in the county palatine of Lancaster. (Repealed by Wigan and Preston Roads Act 1822 (3 Geo. 4. c. iii))
Burnley Roads Act 1795 (repealed)	35 Geo. 3. c. 146	28 April 1795
An Act for amending, improving, and keeping in repair, the road from the town of Burnley, in the county palatine of Lancaster, to the turnpike road leading from Bury to Haslingden, at or near Edenfield Chapel, in the township of Tottington Higher End, in the same county. (Repealed by Road from Burnley to Edenfield Chapel Act 1814 (54 Geo. 3. c. lx))
Highgate and Battle Bridge &c. Roads Act 1795 (repealed)	35 Geo. 3. c. 147	28 April 1795
An Act for amending, improving, and keeping in repair, the road leading from the hamlet of Highgate, in the county of Middlesex, through a certain lane called Maiden Lane, in the parish of Saint Mary, Islington, to a certain place called Battle Bridge, in the same county, and the several other highways and foot paths in the said parish of Saint Mary, Islington, (which are not included in any turnpike acts), and to enable the inhabitants of the said parish to raise money for that and other the purposes therein mentioned. (Repealed by St. Mary Islington Improvement Act 1824 (5 Geo. 4. c. cxxv))
Bedford to Kimbolton Road Act 1795 (repealed)	35 Geo. 3. c. 148	28 April 1795
An Act for repairing, widening, and altering, the road leading from The Way Post, at the north-east end of the town of Bedford, in the county of Bedford, to the north-east end of a lane, in the parish of Kimbolton, in the county of Huntingdon, called The Park Lane. (Repealed by Bedford and Kimbolton Road Act 1852 (15 & 16 Vict. c. lx))
Aylesbury to West Wycombe Road Act 1795 (repealed)	35 Geo. 3. c. 149	5 May 1795
An act for amending, widening, altering, improving, and keeping in repair, the road leading out of the turnpike road between Aylesbury and Wendover, through Princes Risborough, to West Wycombe, in the county of Buckingham. (Repealed by Aylesbury and West Wycombe Road Act 1817 (57 Geo. 3. c. xvii) and Princes Risborough Roads Act 1825 (6 Geo. 4. c. xlv))
Edinburgh etc. Roads Act 1795 (repealed)	35 Geo. 3. c. 150	19 May 1795
An Act to continue, extend, and enlarge, the term and powers of an act, passed in the thirty-second year of the reign of his present Majesty, (Note: Edinburgh Linlithgow and Lanark Roads etc Act 1792 (32 Geo. 3. c. 120)) for making, amending, widening, and keeping in repair, the roads from the new bridge over the water of Almond, on the confines of the counties of Edinburgh and Linlithgow, by Bathgate, to Baillieston, in the county of Lanark, and certain branches of road from the said line of road, and for the other purposes mentioned in the said act. (Repealed by Almond Bridge and Baillieston Road Act 1831 (1 Will. 4. c. xliii))
Keighley to Halifax Road Act 1795 (repealed)	35 Geo. 3. c. 151	19 May 1795
An Act for continuing the term, and altering and enlarging the powers, of two acts of parliament, passed in the twenty-sixth year of the reign of King George the Second, (Note: Bradford and Wakefield Road Act 1753 (26 Geo. 2. c. 83)) and in the seventeenth year of the reign of his present Majesty, (Note: Yorks Roads Act 1777 (17 Geo. 3. c. 73)) for repairing and widening the road from Kighley to Halifax, in the west riding of the county of York, and several other roads therein respectively described, so far as the said act relate to the road from Kighley to Halifax aforesaid. (Repealed by Road from Keighley to Halifax Act 1819 (59 Geo. 3. c. xii) and Annual Turnpike Acts Continuance Act 1867 (30 & 31 Vict. c. 121))
Stamford to Greetham Road Act 1795 (repealed)	35 Geo. 3. c. 152	19 May 1795
An Act for repairing, altering, and improving the road leading from the great north road, in the town of Stamford and county of Lincoln, through the town of Oakham, to the great north road aforesaid, at or near a house called The Cross Guns, in the parish of Greetham and county of Rutland. (Repealed by Road from Stamford to Greetham Act 1817 (57 Geo. 3. c. xlvi) (Note: Incorrectly cited as "57 Geo. 3. c. lxvi" in the Chronological Table of the Statutes.) and Annual Turnpike Acts Continuance Act 1871 (34 & 35 Vict. c. 115))
Towcester to Hardington Road Act 1795 (repealed)	35 Geo. 3. c. 153	19 May 1795
An Act for amending, widening, and keeping in repair, the road leading from Towcester to the turnpike road in Cotton End, in the parish of Hardingston, in the county of Northampton. (Repealed by Towcester and Cotton End Road Act 1817 (57 Geo. 3. c. xi) and Towcester and Cotton End Road Act 1838 (1 & 2 Vict. c. xlv))
Derby Roads Act 1795 (repealed)	35 Geo. 3. c. 154	19 May 1795
An Act to enlarge the term and powers of two acts, passed in the twenty-ninth year of the reign of bis late majesty King George the Second, (Note: Derby and Sheffield Roads Act 1756 (29 Geo. 2. c. 82)) and in the sixteenth year of the reign of his present Majesty, (Note: Derby and Yorks Roads Act 1776 (16 Geo. 3. c. 73)) for repairing and widening the road from The White Stoop, near the north end of the town of Derby, through the towns of Duffield and Chesterfield, in the county of Derby, to the town of Sheffield, in the county of York, and from the said town of Duffield to The Moot Hall, in the town of Worksworth, in the said county of Derby. (Repealed by Derby, Duffield, Wirksworth and Sheffield Turnpike Road Act 1851 (14 & 15 Vict. c. xxxvii))
Glasgow Roads Act 1795 (repealed)	35 Geo. 3. c. 155	19 May 1795
An Act for enlarging the term and powers of an act, passed in the twenty-sixth year of the reign of his late majesty King George the Second, (Note: Glasgow Roads Act 1753 (26 Geo. 2. c. 90)) for repairing several roads leading into the city of Glasgow, and of another act, passed in the twenty-seventh year of the reign of his said late Majesty, (Note: Glasgow Roads Act 1754 (27 Geo. 2. c. 27)) to explain, amend, and render more effectual, the said act, and of another act, passed in the sixth year of the reign of his present Majesty, (Note: Glasgow Roads Act 1766 (6 Geo. 3. c. 82)) to enlarge the term and powers of an act, made in the twenty-sixth year of the reign of King George the Second, for repairing several roads leading into the city of Glasgow, so far as the same relates to the district of roads from Inchbelly Bridge to Glasgow, and from Glasgow to Redburn Bridge; and for altering and ascertaining the course of the last mentioned district of road, so far as the same relate to the said road from Inchbelly Bridge to Glasgow; and for more effectually making, repairing, widening, and keeping in repair, the said road, and the road branching from the aforesaid road from Inchbelly Bridge to Glasgow, and leading to Calder Bridge, and from thence, by or near Balmore, to or near the church of New Kilpatrick, and from thence, by or near Lawmuir, to the town of Old Kilpatrick, beginning at the bridge across the Allander, on the road from Longbank Farm, by Balmulie Bridge to Glasgow on the east, and ending at the said town of Old Kilpatrick on the west, and the road branching from the aforesaid road from Inchbelly Bridge to Glasgow, and leading over Garngad Hill to Provan Mill, and to the present turnpike road leading to Cumbernauld. (Repealed by Garngad Road Act 1840 (3 & 4 Vict. c. cxvii) and Inchbelly Bridge and Glasgow Road Act 1843 (6 & 7 Vict. c. lxxx))
Glamorgan Roads Act 1795 (repealed)	35 Geo. 3. c. 156	19 May 1795
An Act for amending and repairing the road from the Neath turnpike road at or near Abernant, through Merthyr Tidvill, in the county of Glamorgan, to join the publick roads near Rhyd y Blew, in the county of Brecon. (Repealed by South Wales Turnpike Trusts Act 1844 (7 & 8 Vict. c. 91))
Richmond to Lancaster Road Act 1795 (repealed)	35 Geo. 3. c. 157	19 May 1795
An act for continuing the term, and varying and altering the powers, of two acts, passed in the twenty-fourth (Note: Richmond and Lancaster Road Act 1750 (24 Geo. 2. c. 17)) and twenty-ninth (Note: Richmond to Lancaster Road Act 1756 (29 Geo. 2. c. 91)) years of the reign of his late majesty King George the Second, for repairing the road leading from the east end of Brumpton High Lane to the town of Richmond, and from thence to the town of Lancaster; and for repairing the road leading from Richmond, through Gilling, Melsonby, and Aldbrough, to Lucy otherwise Lousy Cross, and from Gilling through Gilling Town Lane, to the turnpike road on Gatherley Moor; and for turning and diverting the said road, from the east end of the town of Bainbridge, to and through the town of Hawes, and up the vale of Widdel, to Gearstones otherwise Graystones; and for making, widening, and keeping in repair, that part of the said road; and for discharging the trustees from the reparation of that part of the said road which extends from the east end of the town of Bainbridge, over the mountain Camm, to Greenside Gate, and from thence to Gearstones otherwise Graystones; and also from the reparation of that part of the said roads which lies between the east end of Brumpton High Lane, and the town of Richmond aforesaid. (Repealed by Richmond (Yorkshire), Lancaster, Lucy Cross and Gatherley Moor Roads Act 1817 (57 Geo. 3. c. xxvii))
Doncaster Road and Bridges Act 1795 (repealed)	35 Geo. 3. c. 158	2 June 1795
An Act for repairing the damage done by the late floods to certain bridges, and to the road, near the town of Doncaster; and for making the said bridges and road safe and commodious for travellers. (Repealed by Road from Doncaster to Tadcaster Cross Act 1831 (1 & 2 Will. 4. c. xv))
Elland to Leeds Road Act 1795 (repealed)	35 Geo. 3. c. 159	2 June 1795
An Act for enlarging the term and powers of three several acts, passed in the fourteenth (Note: Elland to Leeds Road Act 1740 (14 Geo. 2. c. 25)) and twenty-sixth (Note: Elland to Leeds Road Act 1753 (26 Geo. 2. c. 61)) years of the reign of his late majesty King George the Second, and in the seventeenth year of the reign of his present Majesty, (Note: Elland to Leeds Road Act 1777 (17 Geo. 3. c. 87)) for repairing the road leading from Ealand to the town of Leeds, in the weft riding of the county of York. (Repealed by Road from Ealand to Leeds Act 1827 (7 & 8 Geo. 4. c. lxix))
Rochdale Road Act 1795 (repealed)	35 Geo. 3. c. 160	2 June 1795
An Act for enlarging the terms and powers of three acts, made in the eighth (Note: Rochdale, Halifax and Ealand Road Act 1734 (8 Geo. 2. c. 7)) and twenty-seventh (Note: Lancaster and Yorkshire Roads Act 1754 (27 Geo. 2. c. 37)) years of his late majesty King George the Second, and the sixth year of the reign of his present Majesty, (Note: Lancaster and Yorks Roads Act 1766 (6 Geo. 3. c. 90)) for repairing and widening the road from Rochdale, in the county palatine of Lancaster, to the towns of Halifax and Ealand, in the county of York. (Repealed by Rochdale, Halifax and Ealand Road Act 1836 (6 & 7 Will. 4. c. viii))
Aberdeen Roads Act 1795 (repealed)	35 Geo. 3. c. 161	2 June 1795
An Act for making and repairing certain roads in the county of Aberdeen. (Repealed by Aberdeen County Roads and Bridges Act 1800 (39 & 40 Geo. 3. c. xxxii))
Bagshot to Winchester Road Act 1795 (repealed)	35 Geo. 3. c. 162	2 June 1795
An Act for enlarging the term and powers of two acts, passed in the twenty-sixth year of the reign of his late majesty King George the Second, (Note: Surrey and Southampton Roads Act 1753 (26 Geo. 2. c. 51)) and in the thirteenth year of the reign of his present Majesty, (Note: Bagshot to Winchester Road Act 1773 (13 Geo. 3. c. 88)) for repairing and widening the roads leading from Basingstone, (Note: The Basing Stone was located near the former Jolly Farmer public house, at the junction of the A30 and A325 roads.) near the town of Bagshot, in the parish of Windlesham, in the county of Surrey, through Frimley and Farnham, in the same county, and from thence through Bentley, Hollyborn, Alton, Chawton, Ropley, Bishop's Sutton, New Alresford, and Mattingley otherwise Matterley Lane, to the city of Winchester, in the county of Southampton. (Repealed by Bagshot and Farnham, and Alton and Winchester Roads Act 1817 (57 Geo. 3. c. xxvi))
Bedford and Hertford Roads Act 1795 (repealed)	35 Geo. 3. c. 163	2 June 1795
An Act for continuing the term, and altering and enlarging the powers, of several acts, passed in the thirteenth year of the reign of his late majesty King George the First, (Note: Luton and Saint Albans Road Act 1726 (13 Geo. 1. c. 17)) the sixteenth year of the reign of his late majesty King George the Second, (Note: Luton and Saint Albans Road Act 1742 (16 Geo. 2. c. 23)) and the fifteenth year of the reign of his present Majesty, (Note: Bedford and Hereford Roads Act 1775 (15 Geo. 3. c. 72)) for repairing the roads from Luton, in the county of Bedford, to West-wood Gate, in the said county; and from Luton, to Saint Alban's, in the county of Hertford. (Repealed by Maulden Wood Corner and Westwood Gate Road (Bedfordshire) Act 1838 (1 & 2 Vict. c. xlix) and Luton District Road Act 1856 (19 & 20 Vict. c. cviii))
Yorkshire and Derby Roads Act 1795 (repealed)	35 Geo. 3. c. 164	2 June 1795
An Act for continuing the term, and repealing the powers, of two acts, passed in the thirty-first year of the reign of his late majesty King George the Second, (Note: Yorks and Derby Roads Act 1757 (31 Geo. 2. c. 62)) and the nineteenth year of the reign of his present Majesty, (Note: Yorkshire and Derby Roads Act 1779 (19 Geo. 3. c. 96)) for repairing and widening the roads from Little Sheffield, in the county of York, through the towns of Hathersage, Hope, and Castleton, to Sparrowpit Gate, in the county of Derby; and from the guide post near Barber's Fields Cupola, through Grindleford Bridge, Great Hucklow, Tideswell, Hardgate-wall, and Fairfield, to a house known, by the sign of The Angel, (Note: The Angel Inn, Buxton, was located on Spring Gardens. It was demolished in 1849 and replaced by the Royal Hotel. 53°15′33″N 1°54′45″W) in Buxton, in the county of Derby; and for granting further and other powers for that purpose. (Repealed by Sheffield and Chapel-en-le-Frith Roads Act 1825 (6 Geo. 4. c. cxliv))
Kent Roads Act 1795 (repealed)	35 Geo. 3. c. 165	22 June 1795
An Act for continuing the term, and enlarging the powers, of an act, passed in the thirteenth year of the reign of his present Majesty, (Note: Kent Roads Act 1773 (13 Geo. 3. c. 98)) for repairing the road from The Royal Oak, on Wrotham Heath, to the town of Wrotham, in the county of Kent, and from thence to Foot's Craft and from the said Royal Oak to the town of Maidstone, in the said county; and for making a road from the said road between Wrotham and Maidstone into the present turnpike road leading from Mereworth to Hadlow, in the said county. (Repealed by Wrotham Heath Roads (Kent) Act 1828 (9 Geo. 4. c. xviii))
Spalding Road Act 1795 (repealed)	35 Geo. 3. c. 166	22 June 1795
An act to enable the commissioners and trustees for executing an act, passed in the thirty-third year of the reign of his present Majesty, intituled, "An act for draining preserving and improving certain lands lying in the several parishes of Spalding (including the hamlets of Cowbit and Peakill), Weston, Moulton, Whaplode, Holbeach, Fleet, Gedney, Sutton Saint Mary, and Sutton Saint Nicholas otherwise Lutton, all in South Holland in the county of Lincoln," (Note: South Holland Drainage Act 1793 (33 Geo. 3. c. 109)) to support and repair a certain bank extending from Spalding High Bridge to Brother House, in the said county, and to amend and repair the road thereupon; and for compounding with the creditors under an act, passed in the twelfth year of his present Majesty's reign, (Note: River Welland Act 1772 (12 Geo. 3. c. 103)) for making and keeping in repair the said road. (Repealed by South Holland Drainage and Road from Spalding High Bridge Act 1817 (57 Geo. 3. c. lxix), South Holland Drainage and Road from Spalding High Bridge Act 1838 (1 & 2 Vict. c. lxxviii) and Annual Turnpike Acts Continuance Act 1871 (34 & 35 Vict. c. 115))

=== Private acts ===
Short title	Citation	Royal assent
Long title
Van Dyck's Naturalization Act 1795	35 Geo. 3. c. 1 Pr.	5 February 1795
An act for naturalizing Peter Dubbledemuts Van Dyck.
Hanley Castle Inclosure Act 1795	35 Geo. 3. c. 2 Pr.	13 February 1795
An act for dividing and inclosing the open and common fields, common meadows, common pastures, and all other the commonable lands, within the parish of Henley Castle, in the county of Worcester.
Greater Barr Aldridge Inclosure Act 1795	35 Geo. 3. c. 3 Pr.	13 February 1795
An act for dividing, allotting, and inclosing, the several commons and waste lands within the manor of Great Barr and Aldridge, in the parish of Aldridge, in the county of Stafford.
Bishampton Inclosure Act 1795	35 Geo. 3. c. 4 Pr.	5 March 1795
An act for dividing and inclosing the open and common fields, and all other commonable lands and grounds, within the parish of Bishampton, in the county of Worcester.
North Pertherton Inclosure Act 1795	35 Geo. 3. c. 5 Pr.	5 March 1795
An act for dividing and inclosing a certain moor or common called North Moor, and other commons and waste lands, in the parish of North Pertherton, in the county of Somerset.
St. Martin Stamford Baron Inclosure Act 1795	35 Geo. 3. c. 6 Pr.	5 March 1795
An act for dividing and inclosing the common and open fields, meadows, commonable lands, and waste grounds, within the parish of Saint Martin Stamford Baron, in the county of Northampton.
Prees, Darlestone, Fauls, Mickley, Willaston, Morton Say, Longford, Stanton-upon-Hindheath (Salop.) Inclosure Act 1795	35 Geo. 3. c. 7 Pr.	5 March 1795
An act for dividing and inclosing certain commons or waste lands in the townships of Prees, Fauls, Mickley, Willaston, Morton Say, Longford, and Stanton-upon-Hindheath, in the county of Salop.
Bridge Casterton Inclosure Act 1795	35 Geo. 3. c. 8 Pr.	5 March 1795
An act for dividing and inclosing the open fields, meadows, commonable lands, and waste grounds, in the parish of Bridge Casterton, in the county of Rutland.
Cankrien's Naturalization Act 1795	35 Geo. 3. c. 9 Pr.	5 March 1795
An act for naturalizing John Christopher Cankrien.
Naturalization of Frederick Winzer and Simon Bethmann Act 1795	35 Geo. 3. c. 10 Pr.	5 March 1795
An act for naturalizing Frederick Albert Winzer and Simon Maurice Bethmann.
Van Yzendoorn's Naturalization Act 1795	35 Geo. 3. c. 11 Pr.	5 March 1795
An aft for naturalizing John Van Yzendoorn, an infant, of the age of twelve years.
Schmidtmeyer's Naturalization Act 1795	35 Geo. 3. c. 12 Pr.	5 March 1795
An act for naturalizing Peter Schmidtmeyer.
Wiss's Naturalization Act 1795	35 Geo. 3. c. 13 Pr.	5 March 1795
An all for naturalizing Matthew Wiss.
Cold Aston Inclosure Act 1795	35 Geo. 3. c. 14 Pr.	16 March 1795
An act for dividing and inclosing the open common fields, meadows, pastures, and downs, and all the commonable and waste lands, within the manor and parish of Cold-Aston, otherwise Aston Blank, in the county of Gloucester.
Penley Inclosure Act 1795	35 Geo. 3. c. 15 Pr.	16 March 1795
An act for dividing and inclosing the commons or waste lands in the township of Penley, in the county of Flint.
Winterborne Earls and Allington Inclosure Act 1795	35 Geo. 3. c. 16 Pr.	16 March 1795
An act for dividing and allotting certain open and common fields, and other commonable lands and grounds, in the parishes of Winterborne Earls, and Allington, in the county of Wilts.
Bintry and Twyford Inclosure Act 1795	35 Geo. 3. c. 17 Pr.	16 March 1795
An act for dividing, allotting, and inclosing, the whole year lands, brecks, common fields, half year or shack lands, commons, and waste grounds, within the parishes of Bintry and Twyford, in the county of Norfolk.
Brydges' Charity Estate Act 1795	35 Geo. 3. c. 18 Pr.	27 March 1795
An act for sale of an estate in the city of Hereford, given by William Brydges, esquire, for certain charitable purposes, and for applying the money arising by such sale to the like purposes.
Westcott and Middle Barton Inclosure Act 1795	35 Geo. 3. c. 19 Pr.	27 March 1795
An act for dividing and inclosing the open and common fields, common meadows, common pastures, commons, waste, and other commonable lands and grounds, within the parish and precincts of Westcott Barton, and within the liberty and precincts of Middle Barton, in the parish of Steeple Barton, in the county of Oxford.
Burnham Inclosure Act 1795	35 Geo. 3. c. 20 Pr.	27 March 1795
An act for dividing, allotting, and inclosing, the several moors, commons, and waste lands, lying and being within the parish of Burnham, in the county of Somerset.
Wigginton Inclosure Act 1795	35 Geo. 3. c. 21 Pr.	27 March 1795
An act for dividing and inclosing the open and common fields, common meadows, common pastures, commons, waste, and other commonable lands and grounds, within the liberties and precincts of Wigginton, in the county of Oxford.
Banwell Inclosure Act 1795	35 Geo. 3. c. 22 Pr.	27 March 1795
An act for dividing, inclosing, and allotting, certain moors, commons, or waste lands, lying and being within the manor of Banwell, in the county of Somerset.
East Lexham and Great Dunham Inclosure Act 1795	35 Geo. 3. c. 23 Pr.	27 March 1795
An act for dividing, allotting, and inclosing the whole year lands, common fields, half year or shack lands, commons, and waste grounds, within the parishes of East Lexham and Great Dunham, in the county of Norfolk.
Great Catworth Inclosure Act 1795	35 Geo. 3. c. 24 Pr.	27 March 1795
An act for dividing and inclosing the open and common fields, meadows, lands, commons, and commonable places, within the parish of Great Catworth, in the counties of Huntingdon and Northampton.
Kimbolton Inclosure Act 1795	35 Geo. 3. c. 25 Pr.	27 March 1795
An act for dividing and inclosing the open and common fields, meadows, lands, commons, and commonable places, of Wornditch, in the parish of Kimbolton, in the county of Huntingdon.
Palmer's Estate Act 1795	35 Geo. 3. c. 26 Pr.	28 April 1795
An act for vesting part of the settled estates of Richard Palmer esquire, in Sonning, in the county of Berks, in him, in fee simple, discharged of the uses in the will of his late father Robert Palmer esquire, and for settling other lands and hereditaments in Stoning aforesaid, and Hurst, in the said county of greater value, in lieu thereof, to the same uses.
Baring's Exchange Act 1795	35 Geo. 3. c. 27 Pr.	28 April 1795
An act for effectuating an exchange between the rector of the parish of Saint Leonard, in the county of Devon, and John Baring esq; and also between the vicar of the parish of Heavitree, in the same county, and the said John Baring.
Jennings's Estate Act 1795	35 Geo. 3. c. 28 Pr.	28 April 1795
An act for vesting the mansion house called Soddylt Hall, and divers lands, tenements, and herediaments, situate in the county of Salop, devised by the will of Roger Jennings the younger esq; deceased, with the appurtenances, in trustees, in fee simple in possession, discharged of the uses and trusts of the said will, and for sale thereof, and for applying the money to arise from such sale.
Basset's Estate Act 1795	35 Geo. 3. c. 29 Pr.	28 April 1795
An act for discharging the barton of Penwerris, and lands at or near Penryn, in the county of Cornwall, part of the settled estates of sir Francis Basset, of Tehidy Park, in the county of Cornwall, baronet, from the several uses, estates, and trusts, to which the same now stand limited, and for settling a manor and other lands and hereditaments, of greater value, in lieu thereof, to the like uses.
Bishop of Ely's Estate Act 1795	35 Geo. 3. c. 30 Pr.	28 April 1795
An act to enable the honourable and right reverend James lord bishop of Ely, and his successors, to grant certain estates in the isle of Ely, now holden under three leases in several smaller parcels by separate leases.
Bamford's Estate Act 1795	35 Geo. 3. c. 31 Pr.	28 April 1795
An act to enable William Bamford esq; and other persons, after his death, to grant building leases of certain parts of his settled estates in the counties of Lancaster and Chester, reserving rents.
Kyffin's Estate Act 1795	35 Geo. 3. c. 32 Pr.	28 April 1795
An act for vesting the freehold estates late of sir Thomas Kyffin knight, deceased, in trustees, for raising money to pay and discharge his mortgage and specialty debts, and for other purposes.
Steeple Claydon Inclosure Act 1795	35 Geo. 3. c. 33 Pr.	28 April 1795
An act for dividing and inclosing the open and common fields, meadows, and pastures, of and in the parish of Steeple Claydon, in the county of Bucks.
Newton Regis and Clifton Campville Inclosure Act 1795	35 Geo. 3. c. 34 Pr.	28 April 1795
An act for dividing, allotting, and inclosing, the open common fields, common meadows, common pastures, commons, and waste grounds, in the parish of Newton Regis otherwise Newton in the Thistles, in the counties of Warwick and Stafford, or one of them, and also a certain common or parcel of waste ground called Clifton Heath, in the parishes of Newton Regis otherwise Newton in the Thistles, aforesaid, and Clifton Campville, in the county of Stafford, or one of them.
Aston Abbotts Inclosure Act 1795	35 Geo. 3. c. 35 Pr.	28 April 1795
An act for dividing and inclosing the open and common fields, wastes, and other commonable lands, within the parish of Aston Abbots, in the county of Buckingham.
Holme on the Wolds Inclosure Act 1795	35 Geo. 3. c. 36 Pr.	28 April 1795
An act tor dividing and inclosing the open fields, pastures, and commons, within the township of Holme upon the Wolds, in the parish of Holme upon the Wolds, in the east riding of the county of York, and for making a compensation in lieu of the tythes thereof, and of the ancient inclosed lands in the same township.
Padbury Inclosure Act 1795	35 Geo. 3. c. 37 Pr.	28 April 1795
An act for dividing and inclosing the open and common fields, commons, wastes, and other commonable lands and grounds, within the manor and parish of Padbury, in the county of Buckingham.
Tirley Inclosure Act 1795	35 Geo. 3. c. 38 Pr.	28 April 1795
An act for dividing and inclosing the open and common fields, common meadows, common pastures, and other commonable lands, within the parish of Trinley, otherwise Tirley, in the county of Gloucester.
Cheddar Inclosure Act 1795	35 Geo. 3. c. 39 Pr.	28 April 1795
An act for dividing, allotting, and inclosing, the open and commonable lands, within the parish of Cheddar, in the county of Somerset.
Elstub and Everley (Wiltshire) Inclosure Act 1795	35 Geo. 3. c. 40 Pr.	28 April 1795
An act for dividing, allotting, and inclosing, certain open and common fields, common meadows, common pastures, and other commonable and waste lands, in that part of the parish of Wroughton, in the county of Wilts, which is situate, lying, and being, in the hundred of Elstub and Everley.
Upton Inclosure Act 1795	35 Geo. 3. c. 41 Pr.	28 April 1795
An act for dividing and inclosing the open fields, meadows, pastures, common and waste grounds, within the parish of Upton, in the county of Nottingham.
Caunton Inclosure Act 1795	35 Geo. 3. c. 42 Pr.	28 April 1795
An act for dividing, allotting, and inclosing, the open fields, meadow, pasture, and other commonable and waste lands, and grounds, in the townships or hamlets of Caunton, Beesthorpe, Earlshaw, and Knapthorpe, and for exonerating the said townships or hamlets, and also the hamlet of Dean Hall, all in the parish of Caunton, in the county of Nottingham, from the payment of tythes.
Henlow Inclosure Act 1795	35 Geo. 3. c. 43 Pr.	28 April 1795
An act for dividing and inclosing the open and common fields, meadows, pastures, waste lands, and other commonable lands and grounds, in the parish of Henlow, in the county of Bedford.
Sir Henry Vane's Name Act 1795	35 Geo. 3. c. 44 Pr.	28 April 1795
An Act to enable Sir Henry Vane, Baronet, to take the Surname and Arms of Tempest, pursuant to the Will of John Tempest, Esquire, deceased.
Naturalization of Jacqueline Comtesse de Hompesch and James Bouwens Act 1795	35 Geo. 3. c. 45 Pr.	28 April 1795
An act for naturalizing Jacqueline Charlotte comtesse de Hompesch, and James Charles Philip Bouwens.
Cleckheaton Inclosure Act 1795	35 Geo. 3. c. 46 Pr.	30 April 1795
An act for dividing and inclosing the open fields and pastures, within the township of Cleckheaton, in the parish of Birstal, in the west riding of the county of York.
Ratley Inclosure Act 1795	35 Geo. 3. c. 47 Pr.	30 April 1795
An act for dividing and inclosing the open and common fields, commonable lands, and waste grounds, in the parish of Ratley, in the county of Warwick.
Wintringham Inclosure Act 1795	35 Geo. 3. c. 48 Pr.	30 April 1795
An act for dividing and inclosing a certain piece of pasture land in the parish of Wintringham, in the county of Lincoln, called The Cow Pasture, comprising or including certain lands or grounds in the said parish of Wintringham, called The Marsh, Rotten Sykes, Low Groves, and Western Greens, and other land or ground lying between the same pasture and the river Humber; and for dividing, inclosing, and apportioning, certain other pieces of meadow and pasture ground, in the same parish, called The Composition Closes and Hall Closes, and for other purposes
Duke of Argyll's and Archibald Munro's Estates Act 1795	35 Geo. 3. c. 49 Pr.	5 May 1795
An act to enable John duke of Argyll, to exchange certain lands, part of his entailed estate in the shire of Argyll, for certain other lands in the same shire, belonging to himself in fee simple, and to Archibald Munro.
Gally's Estate Act 1795	35 Geo. 3. c. 50 Pr.	5 May 1795
An act for vesting the settled estate of Henry Gaily esq; situate in the county of Huntingdon, in him and his heirs, in exchange for another estate, of greater value, in the county of York, to be settled in lieu of the laid estate in the county of Huntingdon.
Rushbrooke's Estate Act 1795	35 Geo. 3. c. 51 Pr.	5 May 1795
An act for vesting part of the settled estates of Robert Rushbrooke esq; in the county of Suffolk, in the most noble Charles marquis Cornwallis, and his heirs, in fee simple, and for settling an estate of equal value, in the same county, in lieu thereof, and in exchange for the same.
John Dolphin's Estate Act 1795	35 Geo. 3. c. 52 Pr.	5 May 1795
An act for vesting the settled estates, late of John Dolphin esq; deceased, in the county of Stafford, in trustees, to be sold for payment of the portions of the younger children of the said John Dolphin, and for the other purposes therein mentioned.
Clarke's Charity Lands Act 1795	35 Geo. 3. c. 53 Pr.	5 May 1795
An act to enable the trustees of certain lands in Manchester, Crumpsall, and Tetlow, in the county of Lancaster, called Clarke's Charity Lands, to make leases for years upon rack rents, and also to grant building leases, and make conveyances in fee, of and upon all or any part of the said lands under reserved yearly rents.
Smith's Charity Estate Act 1795	35 Geo. 3. c. 54 Pr.	5 May 1795
An act for vesting part of the estates devised by the will of John Smith, formerly of London, merchant, for charitable purposes, in trustees, to be sold to John Pardoe esq; and for laying out the purchase money in other estates to be settled in lieu thereof, and for regulating the charity established by the said will.
Sir Edward Knatchbull's, &c. Estate Act 1795	35 Geo. 3. c. 55 Pr.	5 May 1795
An act for effectuating a partition of certain estates of sir Edward Knatchbull ban. sir Joseph Banks bart. and dame Dorothea his wife, and sir Henry Thomas Gott knt. situate in the counties of Kent and Suffix.
Congleton Inclosure Act 1795	35 Geo. 3. c. 56 Pr.	5 May 1795
An act for dividing and leasing, or letting, certain commons or waste grounds within the borough and township of Congleton, in the county of Chester, and for applying the profits of part of the same in aid of the poors rate, or other taxes or publick expences, within the said township.
Marcle, Wolton and Kinaston (Herefordshire) Inclosure Act 1795	35 Geo. 3. c. 57 Pr.	5 May 1795
An act for dividing and inclosing the open fields, meadows, and pastures, in the townships of Marcle, Wolton, and Kinaston, in the parish of Much Marcle, in the county of Hereford.
Brigstock and Stanion, &c. Inclosure Act 1795	35 Geo. 3. c. 58 Pr.	5 May 1795
An act for dividing and inclosing the common and open fields, meadows, commonable lands, and waste grounds, in Brigstock and Stanion, in the county of Northampton, and such part of the parish of Sudborough, in the same county, as is called Sudborough Green, and also for setting out and allotting lands, in lieu of, and compensation for, the common rights upon Geddington Chase, in the said county of Northampton, and upon that part of the forest of Rockingham, in the same county, which is called The Haye, or Walk, of Farming Woods, and for extinguishing such common rights.
Raper's Naturalization Act 1795	35 Geo. 3. c. 59 Pr.	5 May 1795
An act for naturalizing Felix Vincent Raper.
Brydges' Estate Act 1795	35 Geo. 3. c. 60 Pr.	19 May 1795
An act for vesting part of the settled estates of Samuel Egerton Brydges esq; and Elizabeth his wife, in the county of Kent, and city of Canterbury, in trustees, to sell or exchange the same, and for laying out the money to arise by such sale or exchange in the purchase of other freehold estates to be settled to the same uses.
Tovey's Estate Act 1795	35 Geo. 3. c. 61 Pr.	19 May 1795
An act for investing certain estates of William Tovey the elder, and William Tovey the younger, situate in the county of Warwick, in Dennis Dolan and Henry Maddock, and their heirs, in trust, to sell, for the purposes therein mentioned, such estates having been heretofore conveyed to the said Dennis Dolan and John Finch, and their heirs, as trustees, for the like purposes, and the said John Finch having become bankrupt and absconded from this kingdom before sale thereof.
Hulme's Estate Act 1795	35 Geo. 3. c. 62 Pr.	19 May 1795
An act for amending an act, passed in the tenth year of the reign of his present Majesty, intituled, "An act to enable the trustees of the estates devised by William Hulme esq; to grant building leases thereof, and to encrease the number of exhibitioners to Brazen Nose College, in Oxford, founded by the said testator, and for other purposes therein mentioned;" (Note: Hulme's Estate Act 1770 (10 Geo. 3. c. 51 Pr.)) and to enable the trustees to convey in fee, or grant leases for lives, or for long terms of years, with or without covenants for renewal, or for perpetual renewal, under reserved yearly rents, the said trust estates; and to enable the trustees to apply the trust monies in making such allowance to the exhibitioners at may be thought proper, and for other purposes therein mentioned.
Maddison's Estate Act 1795	35 Geo. 3. c. 63 Pr.	19 May 1795
An act for vesting detached parts of the devised estates of John Maddison esq; deceased, in trustees, to be sold, and for laying out the produce, under the direction of the court of Chancery, in the purchase of other estates, to be settled in lieu thereof to the same uses.
Wootton and Boreshill Inclosure Act 1795	35 Geo. 3. c. 64 Pr.	19 May 1795
An act for dividing, allotting, and laying in severalty, the open fields, lot ground, common meadows, commonable lands, and waste ground, in Wootton and Boreshill, in the parish of Cumner, in the county of Berks.
Osbournby and Newton Inclosure Act 1795	35 Geo. 3. c. 65 Pr.	19 May 1795
An act for dividing and inclosing the open common fields, meadows, pastures, and waste lands, in the parish of Osbournby, in the county of Lincoln, and a plot of half years meadow land, called Mickling Meadow, in the parishes of Newton and Scot Willoughby, or one of them, in the said county.
Scartho Inclosure Act 1795 (repealed)	35 Geo. 3. c. 66 Pr.	19 May 1795
An act for dividing and inclosing the open common fields, meadows, pastures, and other commonable lands and waste grounds, in the lordship of Scartho, in the county of Lincoln. (Repealed by Humberside Act 1982 (c. iii))
Sedgeford Inclosure Act 1795	35 Geo. 3. c. 67 Pr.	19 May 1795
An act for dividing, allotting, and inclosing, the whole year lands, brecks, common fields, half year or shack lands, commons, and waste grounds, within the parish of Sedgeford, in the county of Norfolk.
Hagworthingham Inclosure Act 1795	35 Geo. 3. c. 68 Pr.	19 May 1795
An act for dividing and inclosing the open common fields, pastures, meadows, wastes, and all other open and commonable lands and grounds, in the parish of Hagworthingham, in the county of Lincoln.
Swarby Inclosure Act 1795	35 Geo. 3. c. 69 Pr.	19 May 1795
An act for dividing and inclosing the open fields and meadows, common stinted pasture, and waste lands, within the manor and lordship of Swarby, in the county of Lincoln.
Eaton Socon Inclosure Act 1795	35 Geo. 3. c. 70 Pr.	19 May 1795
An act for dividing and inclosing the open and common fields, meadows, wastes, and other commonable lands and grounds, in the parish of Eaton Socon, in the county of Bedford.
Hillingdon and Cowley Inclosure Act 1795	35 Geo. 3. c. 71 Pr.	19 May 1795
An act for dividing and inclosing certain common fields, in the parishes of Hillingdon and Cowley, in the county of Middlesex.
Abbotts Bromley Inclosure Act 1795	35 Geo. 3. c. 72 Pr.	19 May 1795
An act for dividing and inclosing the common and open fields, commons, and waste grounds, within the parish of Abbots Bromley, otherwise Pagots Bromley, in the county of Stafford.
Eatington Inclosure and Church Act 1795	35 Geo. 3. c. 73 Pr.	19 May 1795
An act for dividing and inclosing the open and common fields within the hamlets of Upper Eatington and Fulready, in the parish of Lower Eatington, in the county of Warwick, and for taking down and rebuilding the church of the said parish.
Barlbrough Inclosure Act 1795	35 Geo. 3. c. 74 Pr.	19 May 1795
An act for dividing and inclosing the several open fields, commons, and waste grounds, within the manor of Barlbrough, in the county of Derby.
Bisbrooke Inclosure etc. Act 1795	35 Geo. 3. c. 75 Pr.	19 May 1795
An aft for dividing and inclosing the open common fields, meadows, pastures, and other commonable lands and waste grounds, within the manor of Bisbrooke, in the county of Rutland; and for dividing a certain common called Liddington Common, adjoining or lying near to the said manor, between the several manors or liberties to which the same belongs; and for extinguishing certain rights of common Upon the open fields and other commonable lands within the manor of Seaton, in the said county.
North Leverton and Habblesthorpe Inclosure Act 1795	35 Geo. 3. c. 76 Pr.	19 May 1795
An act for dividing and inclosing the open fields, meadows, pastures, commons, and waste grounds, within the parishes of North Leverton and Habblesthorpe otherwise Apesthorpe, in the county of Nottingham.
South Leverton Inclosure Act 1795	35 Geo. 3. c. 77 Pr.	19 May 1795
An act for dividing and inclosing the open fields, meadows, pastures, commons, and waste grounds, within the parish of South Leverton, in the county of Nottingham.
Crawley Inclosure Act 1795	35 Geo. 3. c. 78 Pr.	19 May 1795
An act for dividing and inclosing the common and open fields, common meadows, common moors, commons, and waste lands, within the parish of Crawley otherwise Husborn Crawley, in the county of Bedford.
Kirkby in Ashfield Inclosure Act 1795	35 Geo. 3. c. 79 Pr.	19 May 1795
An act for dividing and inclosing the commons and waste lands, within the manor and parish of Kirby in Ashfield, in the county of Nottingham.
Great Hockham Inclosure Act 1795	35 Geo. 3. c. 80 Pr.	19 May 1795
An act for dividing, allotting, and inclosing, the whole year lands, common fields, half year or shack lands, fens, commons, commonable lands, and waste grounds, within the parish of Great Hockham, in the county of Norfolk.
Barnard Castle Inclosure Act 1795	35 Geo. 3. c. 81 Pr.	19 May 1795
An act for dividing and inclosing certain moors, commons, or waste lands, within the manor of Barnard Castle, in the parish of Gainford, and county of Durham, called Barnard Castle Moor, The Little Moor, Glinting Green, and The Baizing Steads.
Chaplin's Agreement Act 1795	35 Geo. 3. c. 82 Pr.	22 May 1795
An act for effectuating an agreement entered into between Charles Chaplin esq; and the matter of the hospital of Saint Michael the archangel, at Well, in the county of York, and the vicar of the parish of Well aforesaid, for making certain lands, tenements, and hereditaments, in the said parish, and in the hamlet of Snape, within the same, subject to certain trusts, rights, or interests, in favour of the said hospital, and to an annual portion or payment to the vicar of Well in lieu of other lands and tythes at Well and Snape aforesaid, and Masham, in the said county.
Bishop of London's (Paddington) Estate Act 1795	35 Geo. 3. c. 83 Pr.	22 May 1795
An act for enabling the lord bishop of London to grant a lease, with powers of renewal, of lands, in the parish of Paddington, in the county of Middlesex, for the purpose of building upon.
Goddard's Estate Act 1795	35 Geo. 3. c. 84 Pr.	22 May 1795
An act for vesting a certain part of the settled estates of the rev. William Goddard, in the county of Wilts, in trustees for sale, and for applying the money arising from the sale thereof, in or towards the discharge of the incumbrances affecting the same, and the remaining part of the said settled estates, and for vesting the surplus of the money anting from the sale thereof (if any) in the purchase of other lands, to be settled to the uses to which the said settled estates now stand limited.
Poulton Inclosure Act 1795	35 Geo. 3. c. 85 Pr.	22 May 1795
An act for dividing, allotting, and inclosing, the open and common fields, common meadows, common pastures, downs, and other commonable and waste lands, in the parish of Poulton, in the county of Wilts.
Hasfield Inclosure Act 1795	35 Geo. 3. c. 86 Pr.	22 May 1795
An act for dividing and inclosing the open and common fields, common meadows, common pastures, and other commonable lands, within the parish of Hasfield, in the county of Gloucester.
Bedford Inclosure Act 1795 (repealed)	35 Geo. 3. c. 87 Pr.	22 May 1795
An act for dividing, allotting, and inclosing, the open and common fields, meadows, closes, commonable lands, pastures, commons, and waste grounds, within the several parishes of Saint Paul, Saint Peter, and Saint Cuthbert, in the town of Bedford, in the county of Bedford. (Repealed by Statute Law (Repeals) Act 1995 (c. 44))
Threipland's Exchange Act 1795	35 Geo. 3. c. 88 Pr.	2 June 1795
An act to enable Patrick Murray Threipland, and the heirs of entail in the lands and estate of Barnhill, to exchange the said lands and estate of Barnhill, lying in the county of Perth, for certain parts of the lands and estate of Fingask lying within the said county of Perth, belonging to Stuart Threipland, of Fingask, physician in Edinburgh, in life rent, and the said Patrick Murray Threipland in fee.
Aldworth's Charity Act 1795	35 Geo. 3. c. 89 Pr.	2 June 1795
An act for sale of an estate in the parish of Bentworth, in the county of Southampton, which has been purchased With a legacy given by the will of Richard Aldworth esq; deceased, for certain charitable purposes, and for applying the money to arise by such sale for the like purposes.
Earl of Strafford's Estate Act 1795	35 Geo. 3. c. 90 Pr.	2 June 1795
An act for confirming and rendering effectual a partition and division between the right honourable Thomas Conolly, Henry Vernon esq; Leveson Vernon esq; and Richard William Howard Kyle an infant, of divers manors, lands, and hereditaments, (heretofore the estate of the right honourable William earl of Strafford, deceased), in the several counties of Bedford, Northampton, Suffolk, Kent, Surrey, Middlesex, and the city of London.
Swillington Inclosure Act 1795	35 Geo. 3. c. 91 Pr.	2 June 1795
An act for dividing and inclosing several open fields, ings, commons, and waste grounds, within the manor, township, and parish of Swillington, in the west riding of the county of York.
Woodborough Inclosure Act 1795	35 Geo. 3. c. 92 Pr.	2 June 1795
An act for dividing, allotting, and inclosing the open and common fields, commonable lands, and waste grounds, within the parish of Woodborough, in the county of Nottingham.
Chattisley Inclosure Act 1795	35 Geo. 3. c. 93 Pr.	2 June 1795
An act for dividing and inclosing the open and common fields, common meadows, common pastures, and other commonable lands, within the parish or chapelry of Chattisley otherwise Chacely, in the county of Worcester.
Ropsley and Humby Inclosure Act 1795	35 Geo. 3. c. 94 Pr.	2 June 1795
An act for dividing and inclosing the open common fields, meadows, pastures, heaths, wastes, and all other open and commonable lands and grounds, in the parish of Ropsley, and in the liberties or townships of Great Humby and Little Humby, in the county of Lincoln.
Kelshall Inclosure Act 1795	35 Geo. 3. c. 95 Pr.	2 June 1795
An act for dividing and allotting the common and open fields, meadows, commonable lands, and waste grounds, within the parish of Kelshall, in the county of Hertford.
Moillett's Naturalization Act 1795	35 Geo. 3. c. 96 Pr.	2 June 1795
An act for naturalizing John Lewis Moilliet.
Londonthorpe Inclosure Act 1795	35 Geo. 3. c. 97 Pr.	22 June 1795
An act for dividing, allotting, and inclosing, the open fields, pasture, waste, and other uninclosed lands and grounds, within the parish or lordship of Londonthorpe, in the county of Lincoln.
Greystoke Inclosure Act 1795	35 Geo. 3. c. 98 Pr.	22 June 1795
An act for dividing and inclosing certain commons and waste grounds, within the barony of Greystoke, in the county of Cumberland.
Grantham Inclosure Act 1795	35 Geo. 3. c. 99 Pr.	22 June 1795
An act for dividing allotting and inclosing the open fields, heaths, pastures, commonable lands and waste grounds, within the lordship or liberties of Spittlegate, Houghton, and Walton, in the parish of Grantham, in the county of Lincoln.
Eckington Inclosure Act 1795	35 Geo. 3. c. 100 Pr.	22 June 1795
An act for dividing and inclosing the commons and waste lands, common fields, and mesne inclosures, within the manor and parish of Eckington, in the county of Derby.
East Stoke and Elston Inclosure Act 1795	35 Geo. 3. c. 101 Pr.	22 June 1795
An act for dividing and inclosing the open arable fields, meadows, pastures, commons, and wane grounds, within the parishes of East Stoke and Elston, in the county of Nottingham, and for ascertaining the boundaries between the said parishes.
Harlaxton Inclosure Act 1795	35 Geo. 3. c. 102 Pr.	22 June 1795
An act for dividing, allotting, and inclosing, the open pastures, commons, and waste lands, within the parish of Harlaxton, in the county of Lincoln.
Millbrooke Inclosure Act 1795	35 Geo. 3. c. 103 Pr.	22 June 1795
An act for dividing and inclosing the open and common fields, common meadows, commonable lands, common warren, and waste grounds, within the parish of Millbrooke, in the county of Bedford.
Owmby Inclosure Act 1795	35 Geo. 3. c. 104 Pr.	22 June 1795
An act for dividing and inclosing the open common fields. and such other commonable lands and waste grounds as are within. and solely belonging to. the lordship of Owmby. in the parish of Searby. in the county of Lincoln.
Stratton St. Margaret Inclosure Act 1795	35 Geo. 3. c. 105 Pr.	22 June 1795
An act for dividing, allotting, and inclosing the open and common fields, common meadows, common pastures, and other commonable and waste lands and grounds in the parish of Stratton Saint Margaret, in the county of Wilts.
Great Parndon Inclosure Act 1795	35 Geo. 3. c. 106 Pr.	22 June 1795
An act for dividing and inclosing certain common arable fields, commons, and waste lands, within the parish of Great Parndon, in the county of Essex.
Edgworth Moor Inclosure Act 1795	35 Geo. 3. c. 107 Pr.	22 June 1795
An act for dividing, allotting, and inclosing, a certain tract of common or waste ground called Edgeworth Moor, in the township of Edgeworth, in the parish of Bolton in the Moors, in the county palatine of Lancaster.
Warboys Inclosure Act 1795	35 Geo. 3. c. 108 Pr.	22 June 1795
An act for dividing, inclosing, and draining, the open common fields, common pastures, commonable and waste lands and fen lands, within the manor and parish of Warboys, in the county of Huntingdon.
Aldrich Inclosure Act 1795	35 Geo. 3. c. 109 Pr.	22 June 1795
An act for dividing and inclosing the commons and waste lands within the lordship or liberty of Aldridge, otherwise Aldrich, in the county of Stafford.
Ravensthorpe Inclosure Act 1795	35 Geo. 3. c. 110 Pr.	22 June 1795
An act for dividing and inclosing the open and common fields, common meadows, common pastures, and other commonable lands and grounds, within the parish of Ravensthorpe, in the county of Northampton.
Boileau's Naturalization Act 1795	35 Geo. 3. c. 111 Pr.	22 June 1795
An act for naturalizing Peter Boileau.
Forest of Knaresborough Inclosure Act 1795	35 Geo. 3. c. 112 Pr.	26 June 1795
An aft for enlarging the time, and reviving certain powers, granted by an act of parliament, made in the twenty-ninth year of the reign of his present Majesty, (Note: Forest of Knaresborough Inclosure Act 1789 (29 Geo. 3. c. 76)) intituled, "An act for reviving certain powers granted by an act, made in the tenth year of the reign of his present Majesty, (Note: Forest of Knaresborough Inclosure Act 1770 (10 Geo. 3. c. 94 Pr.)) intituled, 'An act for dividing and inclosing such of the open part of the district called The Forest of Knaresborough, in the county of York, as lie within the eleven constableries thereof and for other purposes therein mentioned;' and by an act of the fourteenth year of his Majesty's reign, (Note: Forest of Knaresborough Inclosure (Amendment) Act 1774 (14 Geo. 3. c. 54 Pr.)) for amending the said former act, and for making the said two acts more effectual."

=== Sources ===
- Pickering, Danby, ed. (1795). "Anno regni tricesimo quinto Georgii III". The Statutes at Large. Vol. 40. John Burges. pp. 1–513 – via Google Books.
- Pickering, Danby, ed. (1795). "Anno regni tricesimo quinto Georgii III". The Statutes at Large. Vol. 40. John Burges. pp. 1–513 – via Internet Archive.
- Journals of the House of Commons. Vol. 50. London: His Majesty's Stationery Office. 1803. pp. 3–639 – via Google Books.
- Chronological Table of and Index to the Statutes. Vol. 1: To the End of the Session 59 Vict. Sess. 2 (1895) (13th ed.). London: Her Majesty's Stationery Office. 1896. pp. 156–157 – via Google Books.
- "Acts of the Parliament of Great Britain from 1795". legislation.gov.uk. The National Archives.

== 36 Geo. 3 ==
The sixth session of the 17th Parliament of Great Britain, which met from 29 October 1795 until 19 May 1796.

This session was also traditionally cited as 36 G. 3.

=== Public acts ===
Short title	Citation	Royal assent
Long title
Duties on Malt, etc. (No. 2) Act 1795 (repealed)	36 Geo. 3. c. 1	23 November 1795
An act for continuing and granting to his Majesty certain duties upon malt, mum, cyder, and perry, for the service of the year one thousand seven hundred and ninety-six. (Repealed by Statute Law Revision Act 1871 (34 & 35 Vict. c. 116))
Land Tax (No. 3) Act 1795 (repealed)	36 Geo. 3. c. 2	23 November 1795
An act for granting an aid to his Majesty by a land tax, to be raised in Great Britain, for the service of the year one thousand seven hundred and ninety-six. (Repealed by Statute Law Revision Act 1871 (34 & 35 Vict. c. 116))
Exportation and Importation (No. 2) Act 1795 (repealed)	36 Geo. 3. c. 3	23 November 1795
An act to prohibit the exportation of corn, meal, flour, and potatoes, and to permit the importation of corn and other articles of provision for a limited time, in any ships whatever, without payment of duty. (Repealed by Statute Law Revision Act 1871 (34 & 35 Vict. c. 116))
Importation (No. 5) Act 1795 (repealed)	36 Geo. 3. c. 4	23 November 1795
An act to continue an act for permitting the importation of organzined thrown silk, flax, and flax seed, into this kingdom, in ships or vessels belonging to any kingdom or state in amity with his Majesty, for a limited time. (Repealed by Statute Law Revision Act 1871 (34 & 35 Vict. c. 116))
Exportation Act 1795 (repealed)	36 Geo. 3. c. 5	1 December 1795
An act to prohibit the exportation of candles, tallow, and soap, for a limited time. (Repealed by Statute Law Revision Act 1871 (34 & 35 Vict. c. 116))
Making of Starch Act 1795 (repealed)	36 Geo. 3. c. 6	1 December 1795
An act to prohibit for a limited time the making of starch, hair powder, and blue, from wheat, and other articles of food; and for lowering the duities on the importation of starch, and of other articles made thereof. (Repealed by Statute Law Revision Act 1871 (34 & 35 Vict. c. 116))
Treason Act 1795 (repealed)	36 Geo. 3. c. 7	18 December 1795
An act for the Safety and preservation of his Majesty's person and government against treasonable and seditious practises and attempts. (Repealed by Crime and Disorder Act 1998 (c. 37))
Seditious Meetings Act 1795 (repealed)	36 Geo. 3. c. 8	18 December 1795
An act for the more effectually preventing seditious meetings and assemblies. (Repealed by Newspapers, Printers, and Reading Rooms Repeal Act 1869 (32 & 33 Vict. c. 24))
Passage of Grain Act 1795 (repealed)	36 Geo. 3. c. 9	18 December 1795
An act to prevent obstructions to the free passage of grain within the kingdom. (Repealed by Statute Law Revision Act 1871 (34 & 35 Vict. c. 116), Statute Law Revision Act 1892 (55 & 56 Vict. c. 19) and Statute Law Revision Act 1948 (11 & 12 Geo. 6. c. 62))
Poor Relief Act 1795 (repealed)	36 Geo. 3. c. 10	18 December 1795
An act for the better relief of the poor, within the several hundreds, towns, and districts, in that part of Great Britain called England, incorporated by divers acts of parliament for the purpose of the better maintenance and employment of the poor; and for enlarging the powers of the guardians of the poor, within the said several hundreds, towns, and districts, as to the assessments to be made upon the several parishes, hamlets, and places, within their respective hundreds, towns, and districts, for the support and maintenance of the poor. (Repealed by Poor Law Act 1927 (17 & 18 Geo. 5. c. 14))
Lancaster Marsh (Drainage) Act 1795 (repealed)	36 Geo. 3. c. 11	18 December 1795
An act for embanking, draining, and otherwise improving, a certain stinted pasture called Lancaster Marsh, in the county palatine of Lancaster. (Repealed by Lancaster Corporation Water Act 1920 (10 & 11 Geo. 5. c. xvi) and County of Lancashire Act 1984 (c. xxi))
National Debt (No. 6) Act 1795 (repealed)	36 Geo. 3. c. 12	19 December 1795
An act for raising the sum of eighteen millions by way of annuities. (Repealed by Statute Law Revision Act 1870 (33 & 34 Vict. c. 69))
Excise (No. 7) Act 1795 (repealed)	36 Geo. 3. c. 13	24 December 1795
An act for granting to his Majesty additional duties of excise on tobacco and snuff. (Repealed by Statute Law Revision Act 1861 (24 & 25 Vict. c. 101))
Additional Taxes Act 1795 (repealed)	36 Geo. 3. c. 14	24 December 1795
An act for granting to his Majesty further additional duties on the amount of the duties, under the management of the commissioners for the affairs of taxes, therein mentioned. (Repealed by Statute Law Revision Act 1861 (24 & 25 Vict. c. 101))
Duties on Horses Act 1795 (repealed)	36 Geo. 3. c. 15	24 December 1795
An act for granting to his Majesty new duties on certain horses, not charged with duty by any other act or acts of parliament, and on mules. (Repealed by House Tax Act 1803 (43 Geo. 3. c. 161))
Duties on Horses (No. 2) Act 1795 (repealed)	36 Geo. 3. c. 16	24 December 1795
An act for granting to his Majesty several additional duties on horses kept for the purpose of riding, or drawing certain carriages, therein mentioned. (Repealed by House Tax Act 1803 (43 Geo. 3. c. 161))
Duties on Horse Dealers' Licences Act 1795 (repealed)	36 Geo. 3. c. 17	24 December 1795
An act for repealing the duties on licences to persons using or exercising the business of an horse dealer, and granting new duties in lieu thereof. (Repealed by House Tax Act 1803 (43 Geo. 3. c. 161))
Drawbacks and Bounties Act 1795 (repealed)	36 Geo. 3. c. 18	24 December 1795
An act for the reduction of the drawbacks and bounties now allowed on the exportation of sugar. (Repealed by Statute Law Revision Act 1861 (24 & 25 Vict. c. 101))
Duties on Salt Act 1795 (repealed)	36 Geo. 3. c. 19	24 December 1795
An act for determining the present allowances for waste on salt carried coastwise, and for reducing the respective times of payment of the duties on salt. (Repealed by Statute Law Revision Act 1861 (24 & 25 Vict. c. 101))
Distillation from Wheat, etc., Prohibition Act 1795 (repealed)	36 Geo. 3. c. 20	24 December 1795
An act to continue, for a further limited time, an act made in the last session of parliament, intituled, "An act to prohibit, for a limited time, the making of low wines or spirits from wheat, barley, malt, or any other sort of grain, or from any meal, flour, or bran; and for permitting home-made spirits, deposited in the warehouses for exportation, to be taken out for home consumption, on payment of duty;" (Note: Making of Spirits from Wheat, etc. Act 1795 (35 Geo. 3. c. 119)) and to prohibit the distillation of low wines or spirits from melasses of the manufacture of this kingdom, or from sugar or potatoes. (Repealed by Statute Law Revision Act 1871 (34 & 35 Vict. c. 116))
Bounties Act 1795 (repealed)	36 Geo. 3. c. 21	24 December 1795
An act for allowing bounties, for a limited time, on the importation into Great Britain of any wheat, wheat flour, Indian corn, Indian meal, or rye, in British ships, or other ships the property of persons of any kingdom or state in amity with his Majesty, or on the delivery of the same out of warehouse for home consumption. (Repealed by Statute Law Revision Act 1871 (34 & 35 Vict. c. 116))
Making of Bread Act 1795 (repealed)	36 Geo. 3. c. 22	24 December 1795
An act to permit bakers to make and sell certain sorts of bread. (Repealed by Statute Law Revision Act 1861 (24 & 25 Vict. c. 101))
Relief of the Poor Act 1795 (repealed)	36 Geo. 3. c. 23	24 December 1795
An act to amend so much of an act, made in the ninth year of the reign of King George the First, intituled, "An act for amending the laws relating to the settlement, employment, and relief of the poor," (Note: Poor Relief Act 1722 (9 Geo. 1. c. 7)) as prevents the distributing occasional relief to poor persons in their own houses, under certain circumstances and in certain cases. (Repealed by Poor Law Amendment Act 1834 (4 & 5 Will. 4. c. 76))
Mutiny (No. 2) Act 1795 (repealed)	36 Geo. 3. c. 24	24 December 1795
An act for punishing mutiny and desertion; and for the better payment of the army and their quarters. (Repealed by Statute Law Revision Act 1871 (34 & 35 Vict. c. 116))
Grand Junction Canal (No. 4) Act 1795	36 Geo. 3. c. 25	24 December 1795
An Act to enable the Company of Proprietors of the Grand Junction Canal to finish and complete the same, and the several Cuts and other Works authorized to be made and done by them, by virtue of several Acts of Parliament.

=== Private acts ===
Short title	Citation	Royal assent
Long title
Mitchelmersh and Timsbury Inclosure Act 1795	36 Geo. 3. c. 1 Pr.	18 December 1795
An Act for dividing, allotting, and inclosing, the Open and Common Fields, Common Downs, Common Meadows, Waste Lands, and other Commonable Places, within the several Tythings or Hamlets of Mitchelmersh, Braishfield, and Awbridge, in the Manor and Parish of Mitchelmersh, and within the Manor and Parish of Timsbury, in the County of Southampton.
Wakeman's Divorce Act 1795	36 Geo. 3. c. 2 Pr.	18 December 1795
An Act to dissolve the Marriage of Henry Wakeman, Esquire, with Theodosia Freeman his now Wife, and to enable him to marry again, and for other Purposes therein mentioned.
Naturalization of Alexander Boué and John Albrecht Act 1795	36 Geo. 3. c. 3 Pr.	18 December 1795
An Act for naturalizing Alexander Charles Boué and John Henry Charles Albrecht.
Freese's Naturalization Act 1795	36 Geo. 3. c. 4 Pr.	18 December 1795
An Act for naturalizing John Henry Freese.
Pottgeisser's Naturalization Act 1795	36 Geo. 3. c. 5 Pr.	18 December 1795
An Act for naturalizing Petrus Wilhelmus Aloysius Pottgeisser.
Blaauw's Naturalization Act 1795	36 Geo. 3. c. 6 Pr.	18 December 1795
An Act for naturalizing Marie Anne Blaauw, commonly called Maria Ann Blaauw.

=== Sources ===
- Pickering, Danby, ed. (1795). "Anno regni tricesimo sexto Georgii III". The Statutes at Large. Vol. 40. pp. 545–628 – via Google Books.
- Journals of the House of Commons. Vol. 51. London: His Majesty's Stationery Office. 1803. pp. 3–793 – via Google Books.
- Chronological Table of and Index to the Statutes. Vol. 1: To the End of the Session 59 Vict. Sess. 2 (1895) (13th ed.). London: Her Majesty's Stationery Office. 1896. pp. 157–158 – via Google Books.
- "Acts of the Parliament of Great Britain from 1795". legislation.gov.uk. The National Archives.

== See also ==
- List of acts of the Parliament of Great Britain
