= Toton =

Village in Nottinghamshire, England

Coordinates: 52.907°N 1.254°W

- Village
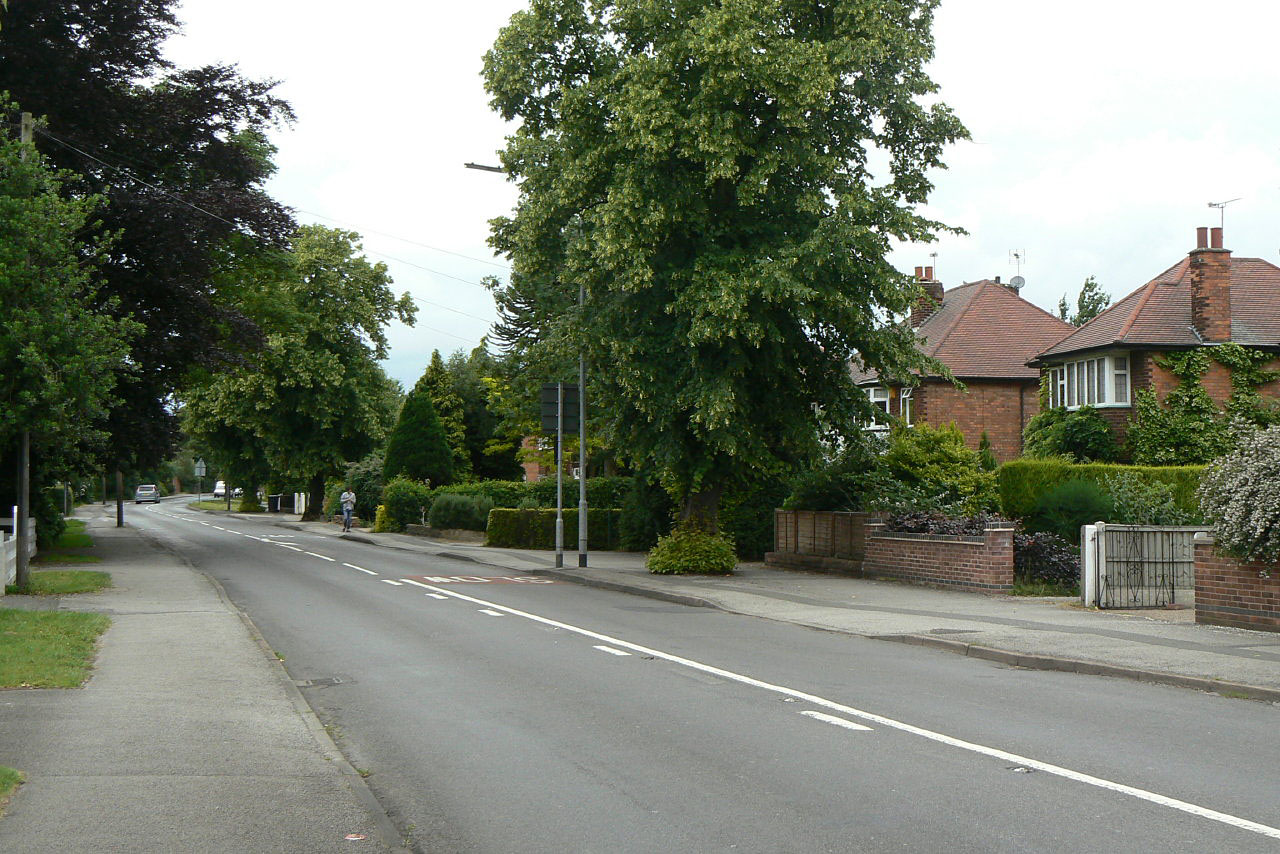
- Stapleford Lane

- Location within Nottinghamshire
- Population: 8,238 (Ward 2011)
- OS grid reference: SK 50166 34692
- District: Borough of Broxtowe
- Shire county: Nottinghamshire
- Region: East Midlands
- Country: England
- Sovereign state: United Kingdom
- Post town: NOTTINGHAM
- Postcode district: NG9
- Dialling code: 0115
- Police: Nottinghamshire
- Fire: Nottinghamshire
- Ambulance: East Midlands
- UK Parliament: Broxtowe

Toton /ˈtoʊtən/ is a large suburban village in the Borough of Broxtowe in Nottinghamshire, England. It forms part of the built-up area of Beeston, which in turn forms part of the wider Nottingham Urban Area. The population of the electoral ward of Toton and Chilwell Meadows was 7,298 in the 2001 census; it increased to 8,238 at the 2011 census.

Until 1974, Toton was part of Beeston and Stapleford Urban District, having been in Stapleford Rural District until 1935. The border with Derbyshire lies immediately to the west.

Toton adjoins the Chetwynd Barracks (also known as Chilwell Depot), which forms a boundary to the east; the Erewash Valley railway line and Toton traction maintenance depot form a boundary to the west.

== History ==
Although the village of Toton has existed since at least Norman times, little is known of its history. It is known that Toton parish at one time encompassed a much larger area than is now apparent, including much of what is now Attenborough village; it shared a church (probably on the site of St. Mary's, Attenborough) with the neighbouring Chilwell parish, an arrangement that was unusual for the times.

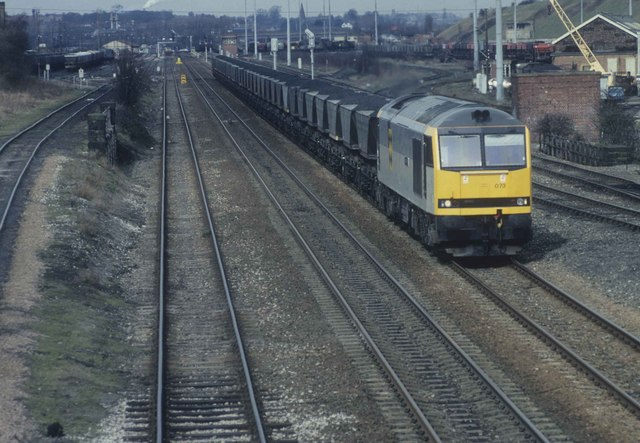
A train leaving Toton Sidings to deliver coal to nearby Ratcliffe-on-Soar Power Station

The village itself was, for most of its history, small and dominated by agriculture. It then grew principally because of Toton Sidings (see Toton Traction Maintenance Depot), a huge marshalling yard of the Midland Railway, where coal mined from Nottinghamshire coal fields would be sorted and distributed across Great Britain. The area's population grew substantially during World War I when most of the area of level ground between Chilwell and Toton was occupied by the National Shell Filling Factory No. 6 and the original direct route between Chilwell and Toton became a gated military road, now known as Chetwynd Road; this site is now known as Chetwynd Barracks.

As a result, the nature of the village changed drastically in the twentieth century. Almost all the agricultural land (mostly orchards) to the north of the A6005 was developed with housing. A few of the old orchard trees were retained in some gardens. Most of the old farmhouses were demolished and perhaps twelve buildings remain that are pre-1900. Almost no visible traces remain of Toton's agricultural past.

== Governance ==
Toton was historically a township in the parish of Attenborough. It became a civil parish in 1866. In 1931 the parish had a population of 644. On 1 April 1935 the parish was abolished and merged into Beeston and Stapleford urban district. Beeston and Stapleford Urban District was abolished in 1974 to become part of Broxtowe. No successor parish was created and it became an unparished area.

As of 2025, the borough ward is served by two Conservative party councillors: Stephanie Kerry and Halimah Khaled MBE, as well as Teresa Cullen, who is a member of the Broxtowe Alliance party.

== Amenities ==
=== Parks and open space ===
Manor Park (built on the site of the old Manor Farm) is a popular council park, with well-maintained cricket and football pitches, tennis courts and a bowling green. This joins onto Banks Road Open Area, an extended strip of land along and between the banks of the River Erewash and its overflow channel; it stretches up along Toton Bank. These areas are managed collectively as Toton Fields Local Nature Reserve.

Toton Washlands is a nature reserve, created by the Environment Agency to the west of Toton Sidings, that serves as flood defence for the River Erewash and sits to the east of the Erewash Canal. Although it is within the village's boundaries, it is only possible to access the area from neighbouring Long Eaton due to the presence of the sidings.

=== Schools ===
Toton has four schools:

- Banks Road Infant and Nursery School
- Bispham Drive Junior School
- Chetwynd Primary Academy
- George Spencer Academy and Sixth Form.

=== Sport ===
Toton has its own cricket team and various football teams, including Toton Tigers, Toton Tornadoes and Toton United; most teams train at the local cricket ground of Beeston and Toton Sycamore Cricket Club or Manor Farm open space. Toton also has a bowling green, at which Toton Bowls Club are based, along with tennis courts and outdoor play areas.

=== Churches ===
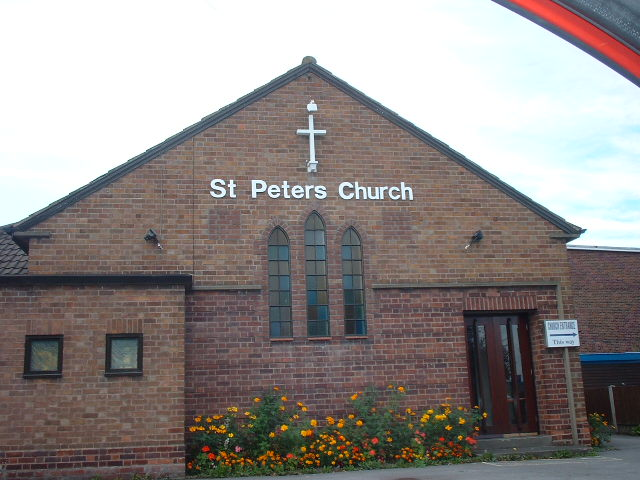
St Peter's Church

Toton has three churches: St. Peter's (Church of England), the Church of Jesus Christ of Latter-day Saints and Toton Methodist Church. Toton Methodist Church and St. Peter's are in a covenanted Churches Together relationship, working together frequently on various community activities.

=== Scout groups ===
Toton has two scout groups: 1st Toton, based at St Peters church, and 2nd Toton, at Greenwood Community Centre.

== Transport ==
=== Buses ===
Barton Buses originally served Toton, with a direct service to Nottingham (route 1). The village was also served by a direct bus to and from Stapleford. Several changes were made during the 1990s and the first decade of the 21st century, resulting in significant parts of the village losing through service to Nottingham and Stapleford.

Key routes operated by Trent Barton include:

- Indigo service between Nottingham and Derby
- Skylink service between Nottingham, East Midlands Airport and Coalville

Route 510, operated by Nottsbus Connect, runs between Beeston and Stapleford; it connects with Toton Lane tram stop.

=== Tram ===
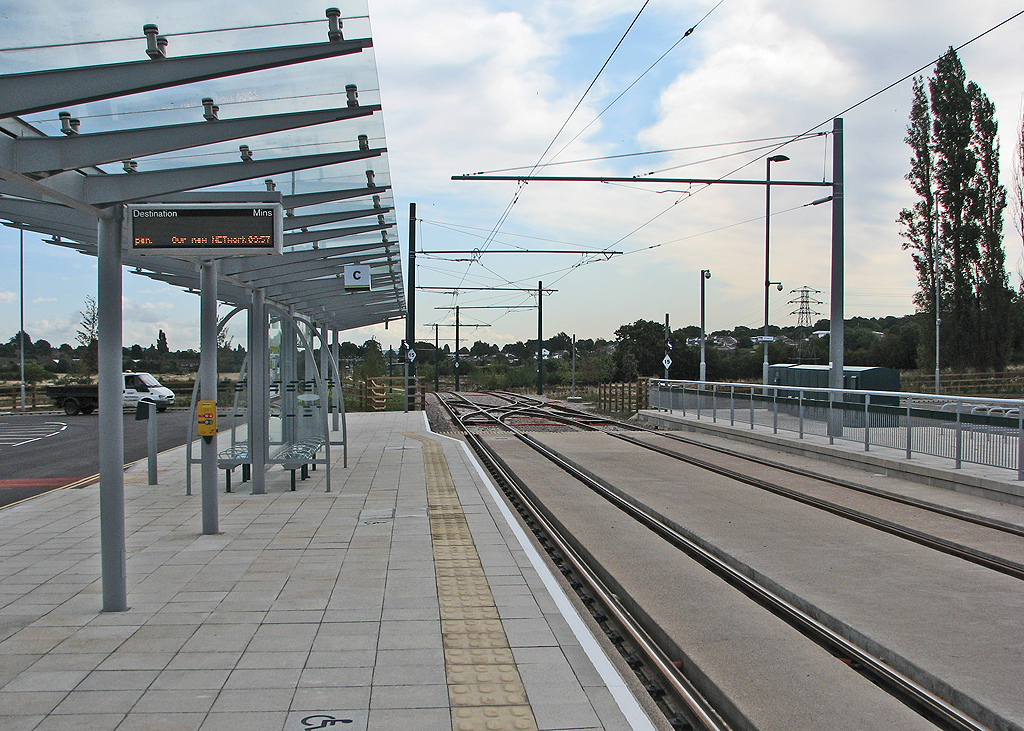
The tram stop looking towards Nottingham

Line 1 of the Nottingham Express Transit connects Toton Lane tram stop, located to the south of Bardills Island (A52), and Hucknall, via Nottingham city centre.

The tram line was intended to reach a proposed HS2 station that was to be built at Toton Sidings, just a short distance from the Toton Lane terminus. The tram was to have passed through a planned housing and hotel development and was shown on the application submission.

=== Railway ===
The nearest railway stations are Long Eaton and Attenborough; both are served by routes operated by East Midlands Railway and CrossCountry.

==== High Speed 2 ====
East Midlands Hub was a planned development on the site of some former railway sidings, which was expected to open around 2032. It was to be served by High Speed 2 services to northern cities, and south to London and Birmingham. It was also meant to serve as a regional hub and an interchange between high speed services, local rail services, the Nottingham Express Transit network and bus services.

Plans for the leg of the line between Birmingham and Leeds have since been scrapped.
