= Broxtowe Wapentake =

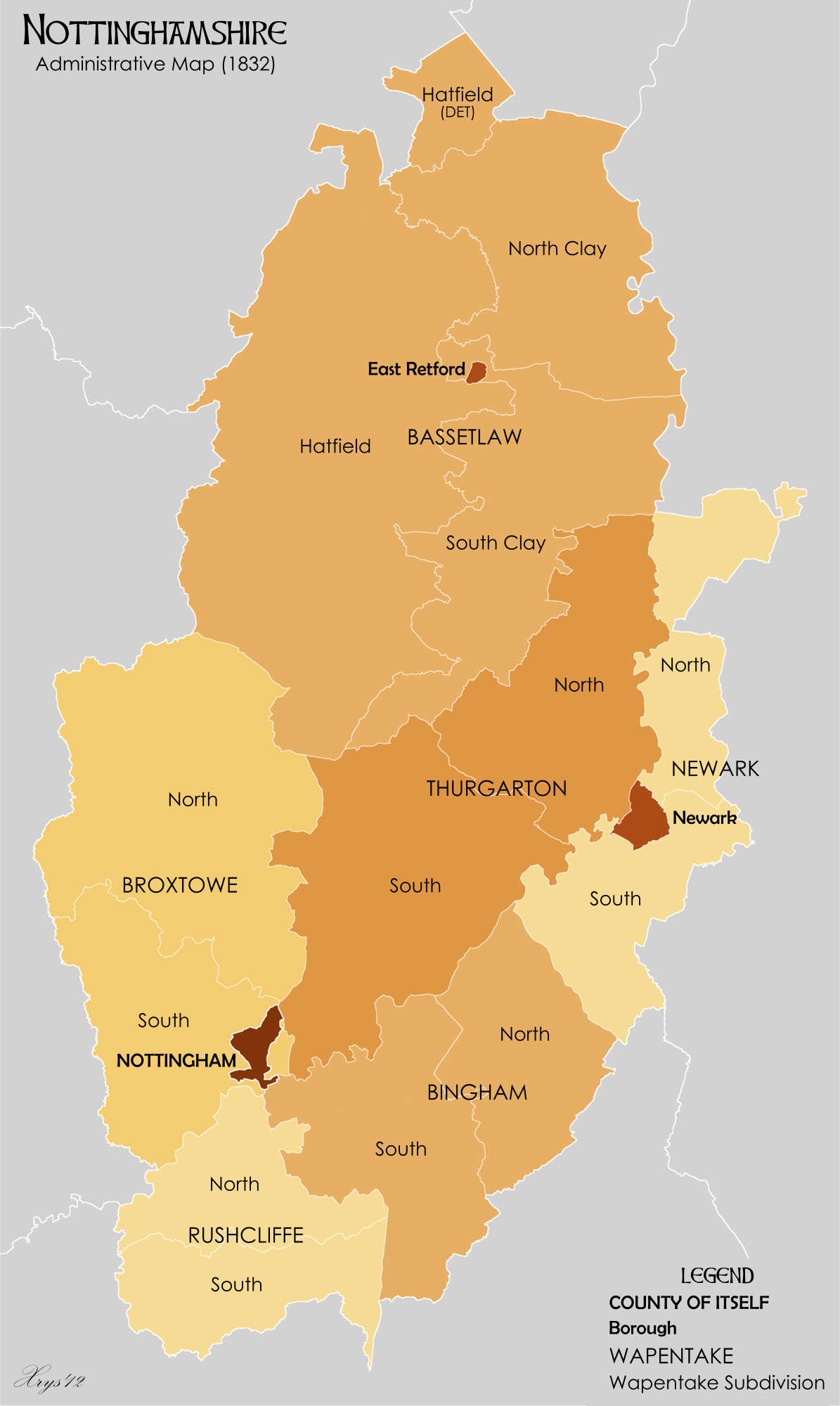
Map showing the Broxtowe wapentake

Broxtowe was a wapentake (equivalent to a hundred) of the ancient county of Nottinghamshire, England.

It was in the west of the county covering the parishes of Annesley, Arnold, Attenborough, Basford, Beeston, Bestwood Park, Bilborough, Bramcote, Brewhouse Yard, Bulwell, Chilwell, Cossall, Eastwood, Felley, Fulwood, Greasley, Hucknall Torkard, Huthwaite, Kirkby-in-Ashfield, Lenton, Linby, Mansfield, Mansfield Woodhouse, Newstead, Nuthall, Papplewick, Radford, Selston, Skegby, Standard Hill, Stapleford, Strelley, Sutton in Ashfield, Teversal, Toton, Trowell and Wollaton.

Contained within the boundaries of the wapentake is the Borough of Broxtowe, created in 1974. Other current local government areas within the wapentake are Ashfield, Mansfield, part of the City of Nottingham and small parts of Gedling and Newark and Sherwood.
