= Chilwell Filling Factory Memorial =

Building in Nottinghamshire, England

Coordinates: 52.911889°N 1.2450278°W

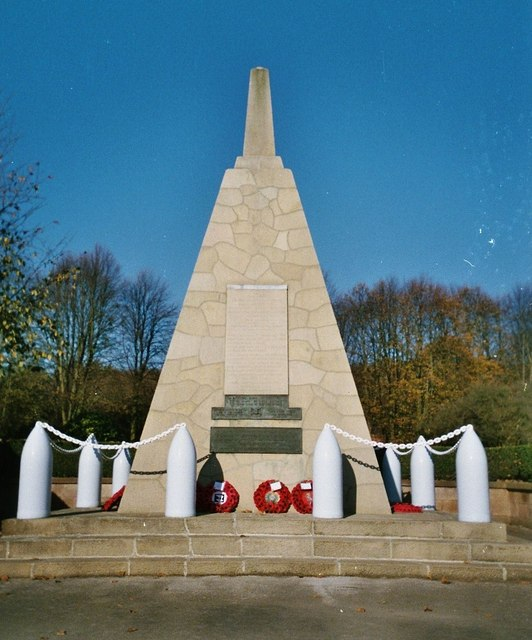
The memorial in 2005

The memorial to munitions workers of National Filling Factory No.6, Chilwell is a Grade II listed building on the north side of Chetwynd Road inside Chetwynd Barracks, in Chilwell, near Nottingham. It commemorates the workers who died in accidents at National Shell Filling Factory, Chilwell during the First World War, particularly the large explosion on 1 July 1918. The large free-standing pyramidal monument, enclosed by chains carried on shell casings, was unveiled in 1919 and became a Grade II listed building in 1987.

== Background ==
Munitions production in the UK expanded considerably after the outbreak of the First World War in 1914, but production failed to keep pace with the demand, with shortages leading to a Shell Scandal in 1915. The Munitions of War Act 1915 gave the government the power to establish different types of National Factories.

National Filling Factory No 6 was established in Chilwell, Nottinghamshire, as a filling factory, where empty shell casings that were manufactured elsewhere could be filled with explosives. It opened in February 1916, to fill high explosive shells of 4.7 in (120 mm) or larger calibres, with amatol, usually made on site by mixing one part TNT to four parts ammonium nitrate. The factory was under the oversight and management of Viscount Chetwynd, who introduced special features to improve efficiency and safety: by 1916 it was filling 130,000 shells with 900 tons of amatol each week.

In its first two years of operations, there were several small isolated explosions at the factory that killed one or two people each. A massive explosion occurred on the evening of 1 July 1918 when 8 tons of explosives were detonated, destroyed the Mixing House, the Mixing House Extension, the TNT Mill, the TNT Stores, and other buildings. The blast affected buildings up to 3 mi (4.8 km) away.

The explosion killed 134 people, accounting for more than half of the 218 fatalities at National Filling Factories during the First World War. The dead including 25 women, and all of the workers in the Mixing House and TNT Mill, but only 32 of the bodies could be identified. Another 250 people were injured. Fires caused by the explosion were brought under control within half an hour, preventing another 15 tons of TNT exploding. Despite the widespread damage, rapid repairs allowed the factory to continue its shell filling work the next day.

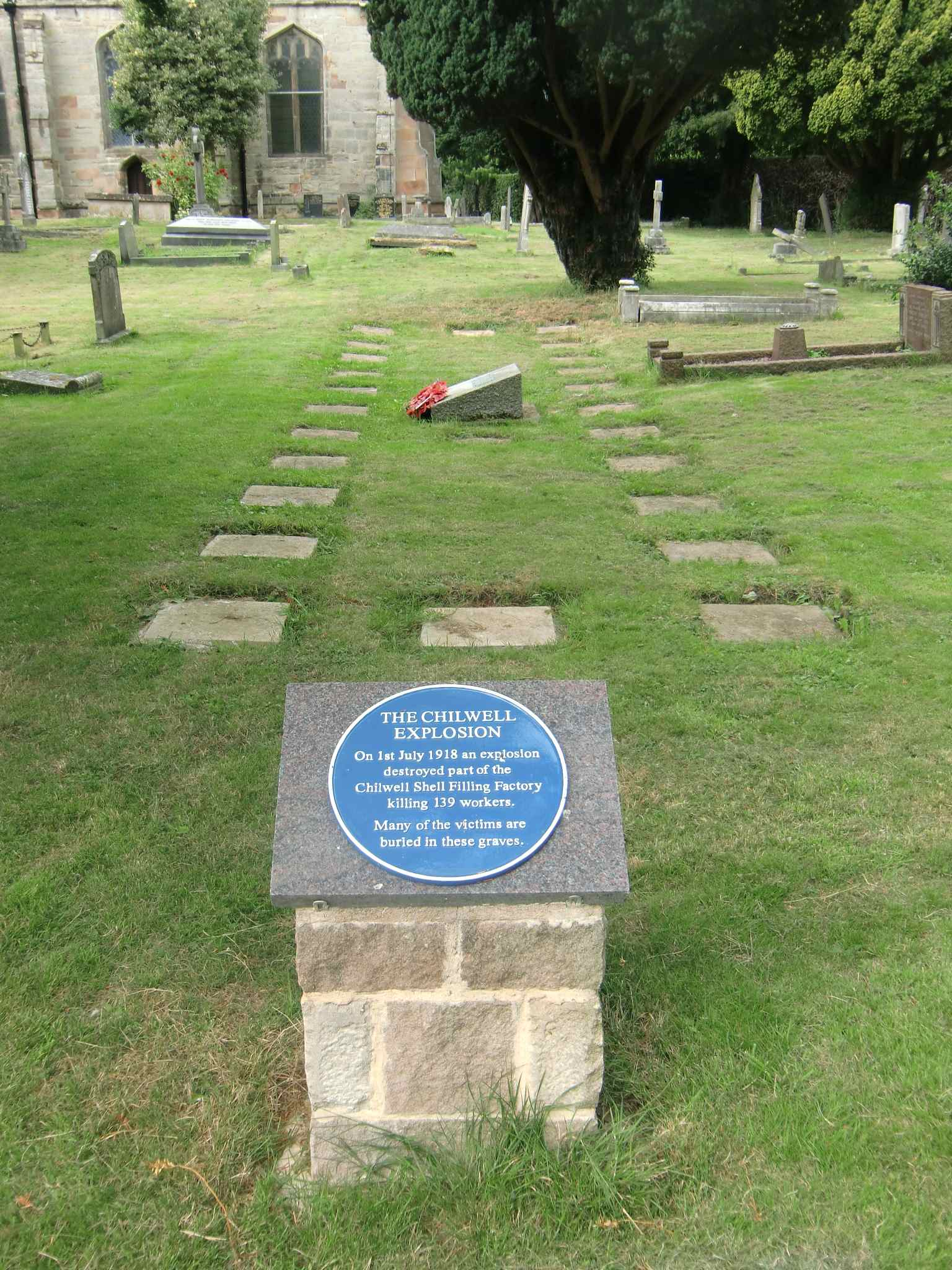
Mass grave marker at St Mary's Church, Attenborough

The dead were buried in mass graves at the parish church in Attenborough. A Home Office committee published its report into the explosion on 7 August, and the police investigated suspicions of sabotage. Neither conclusively identified the cause of the explosion.

For their acts of bravery during the incident, twelve workers were awarded the British Empire Medal, and the works manager Arthur Hilary Bristowe, who tipped burning TNT from conveyor belt trays in the TNT Mill, received the Edward Medal.

The site later became a Royal Army Ordnance Corps Depot, and it is still within the restricted area of Chetwynd Barracks.

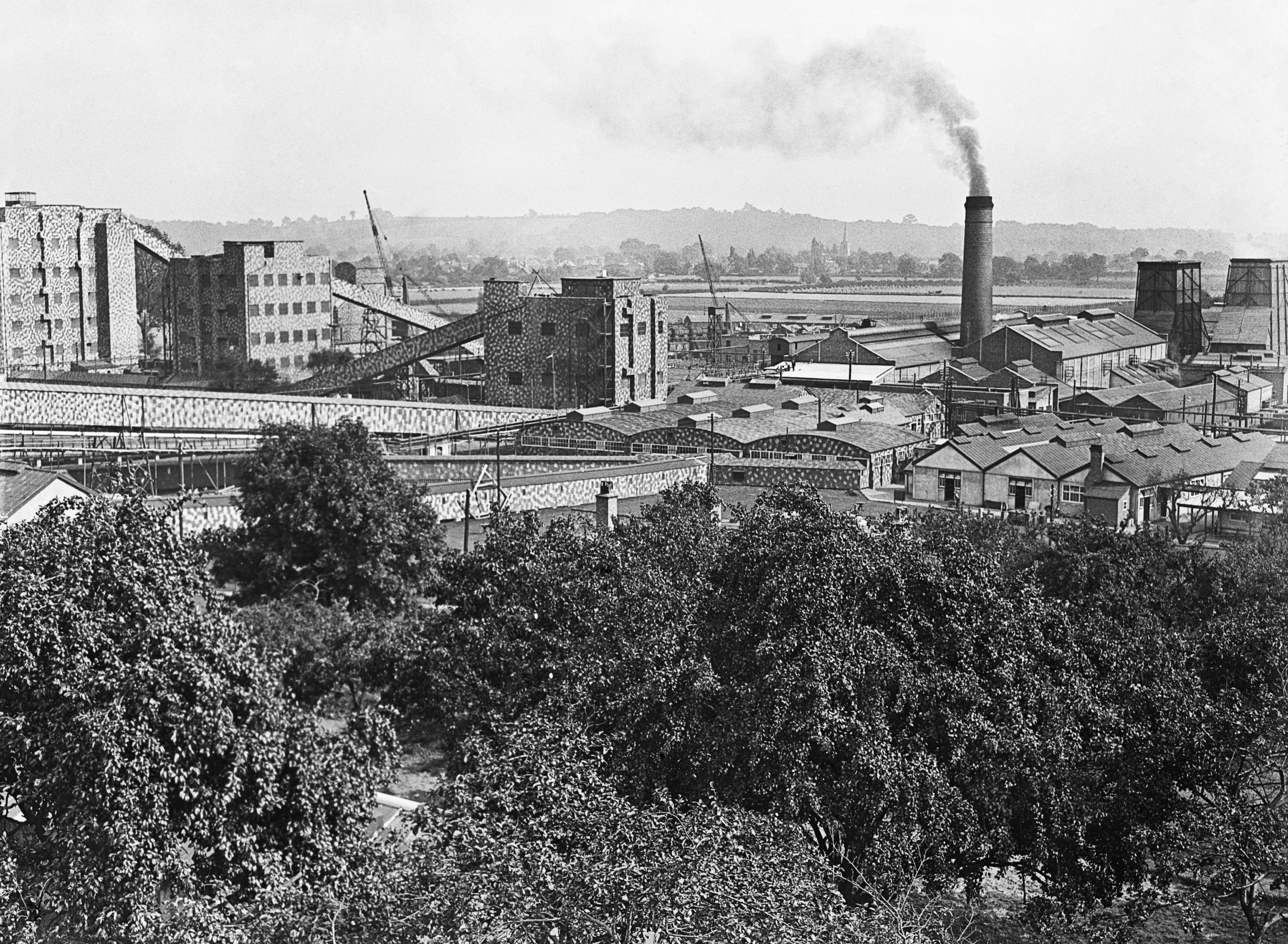
View of the Filling Factory in Chilwell in 1915

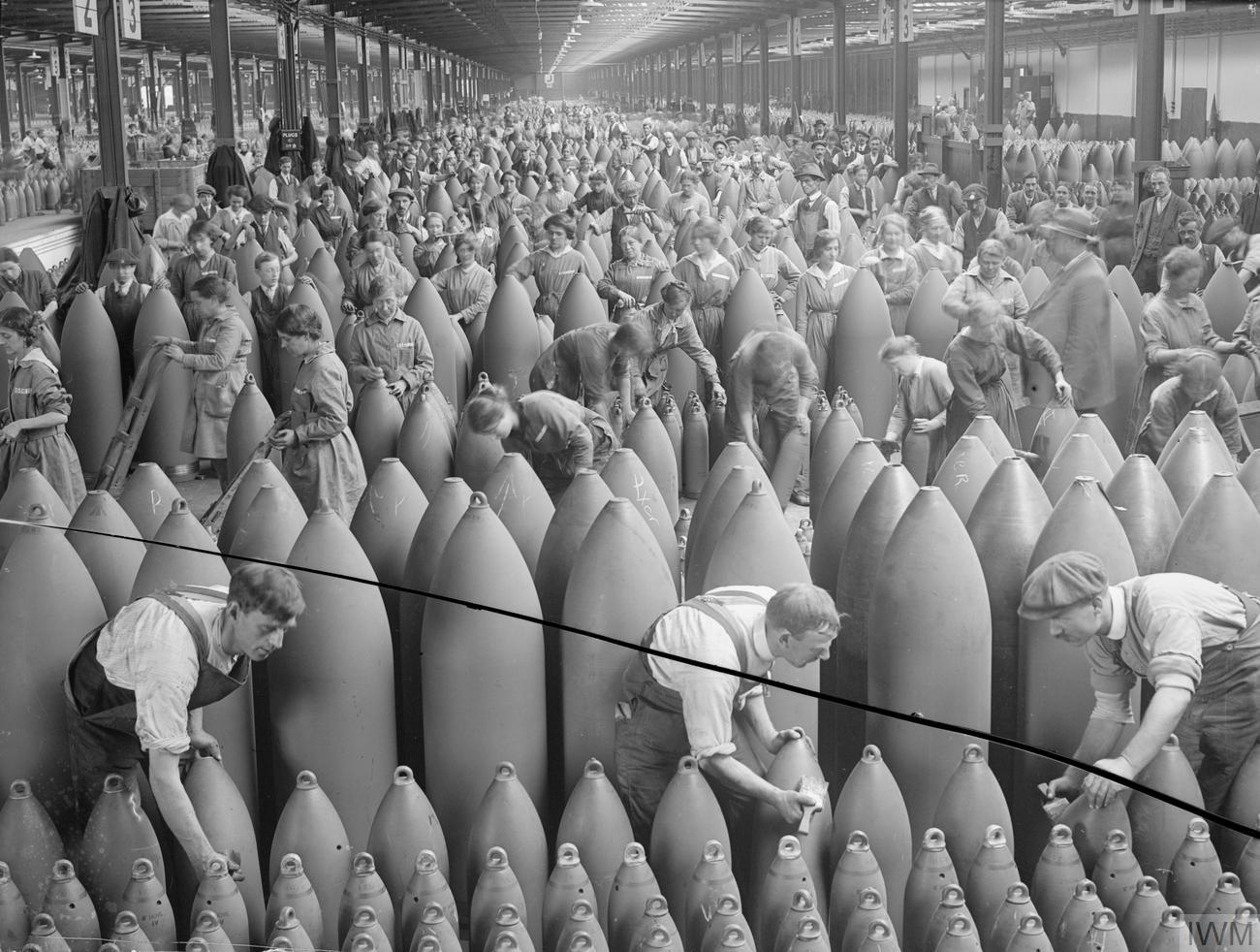
Painting shells in the National Shell Filling Factory, Chilwell. July 1917

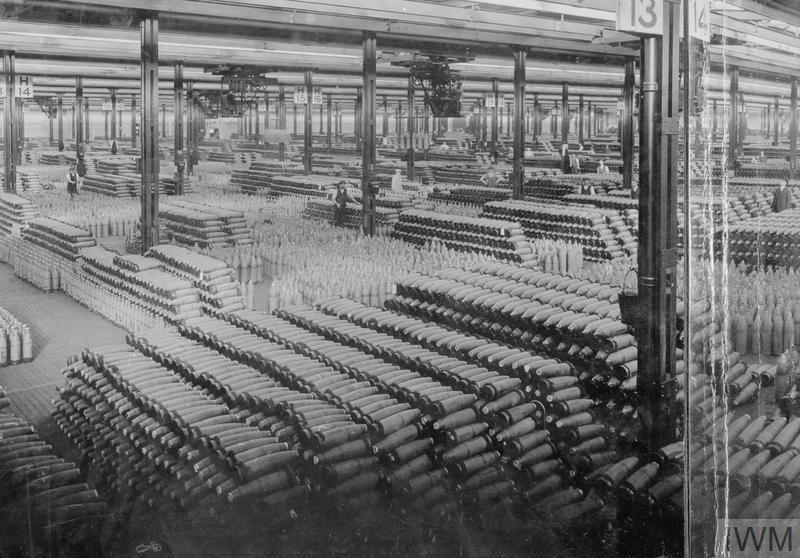
The shell store at the National Shell Filling Factory at Chilwell, Nottinghamshire, on 5 November 1918

== Memorial ==
The memorial stands on the north side of Chetwynd Road, near where the factory's Mixing House stood, at or near the seat of the explosion. It commemorates all those killed at the factory in addition to the 134 killed in July 1918. It was built by the factory's workmen, under the supervision of the factory's construction manager, Mr SA Kay. The structure comprises a large concrete truncated square pyramid, standing on three steps and topped by a short obelisk. Around the top step are mounted shell casings joined by chains, all painted white, with an opening to the road at the front. It is surrounded on three sides by a low wall and hedge.

Ashlar panels on the faces of the pyramid bear inscriptions with a dedication and names. The front panel facing the road bears Lord Chetwynd's monogram, and the main dedicatory inscription: "ERECTED / TO THE MEMORY OF THOSE / MEN AND WOMEN / WHO LOST THEIR LIVES BY EXPLOSIONS / AT THE NATIONAL SHELL FILLING FACTORY / CHILWELL / 1916 TO 1918" and then statistical details of the factory's output "PRINCIPAL HISTORICAL FACTS / OF THE FACTORY / FIRST SOD TURNED 13TH SEPTEMBER 1915 / FIRST SHELL FILLED 8TH JANUARY 1916 / NUMBER OF SHELLS FILLED / WITHIN ONE YEAR OF / CUTTING THE FIRST SOD / 1,200,000 / TOTAL SHELLS FILLED / 19,359,000 / REPRESENTING 50.8% OF THE TOTAL / OUTPUT OF HIGH EXPLOSIVE SHELL / BOTH LYDDITE AND AMATOL 60PD TO 15INCH / PRODUCED IN GREAT BRITAIN DURING THE WAR / TOTAL TONNAGE OF EXPLOSIVE USED / 121,360 TONS / TOTAL WEIGHT OF FILLED SHELL / 1,100,000 TONS".

The memorial was unveiled on 13 March 1919 by William Cavendish-Bentinck, 6th Duke of Portland.

A later bronze plaque with a military badge was added after the Second World War, which bears the further dedication "TO THE GLORY OF GOD AND / IN MEMORY OF THOSE WHO GAVE / THEIR LIVES IN TWO WORLD WARS / AT THE GOING DOWN OF THE SUN / AND IN THE MORNING / WE WILL REMEMBER THEM / THEIR NAME LIVETH / FOR EVERMORE".

The memorial was re-dedicated on 30 June 1968, to mark the fiftieth anniversary of the 1918 explosion. A further bronze plaque records the unveiling of the restored monument by the Parliamentary Under-Secretary of State for Defence James Boyden MP, with the inscription: "UNVEILED ON 30TH OF JUNE 1968 BY MR JAMES BOYDEN MP / PARLIAMENTARY UNDERSECRETARY OF STATE FOR THE ARMY / ON THE OCCASION OF THE 50TH ANNIVERSARY OF THE EXPLOSION AT CHILWELL / "THE V.C. FACTORY" / IN RECOGNITION OF THE BRAVERY AND FORTITUDE OF THE EMPLOYEES".

The Chilwell memorial received a Grade II listing in 1987.

== See also ==
- Listed buildings in Attenborough and Chilwell
- 2 April 1916: an explosion at the Explosives Loading Company plant in Faversham killed 108 people and injured around 100 others
- 19 January 1917: the Silvertown explosion at the Brunner Mond TNT plant, killed 73 people (including 18 workers, 69 immediately, 4 from injuries) and injured around 400 others
- 13 June 1917: the Ashton-under-Lyne munitions explosion at the Hooley Hill Rubber and Chemical Works killed 23 workers and 20 local residents
