= Chetwynd Barracks =

Military installation in Nottinghamshire, England

- Chilwell
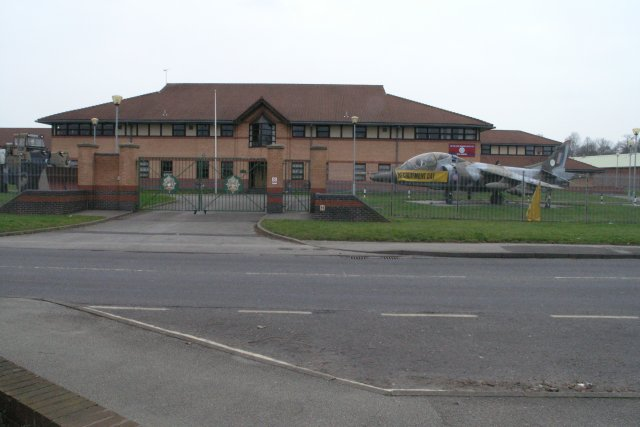
- Chetwynd Barracks

Site information
- Type: Barracks
- Owner: Ministry of Defence
- Operator: British Army

Location
- Location within Nottinghamshire
- Coordinates: 52°54′34″N 01°15′23″W

Site history
- Built: 1919
- Built for: War Office
- In use: 1919–present

Garrison information
- Occupants: Royal Engineers Works Groups; EOD Troop; HMS Sherwood

Chetwynd Barracks is a British Army installation at Chilwell, Nottinghamshire, England. HMS Sherwood, a Royal Naval Reserve stone frigate, is located within the barracks. The site will close in 2026.

== History ==
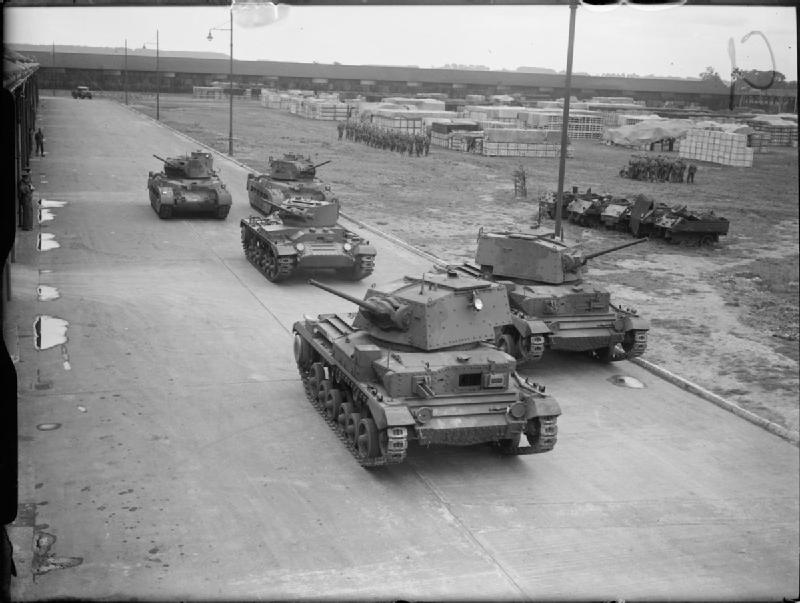
COD Chilwell in 1940

=== British Army ===
The Chilwell depot and barracks were built for the Royal Army Ordnance Corps shortly after the First World War on the former site of the National Shell Filling Factory, Chilwell, which had been completely devastated by an explosion in July 1918. The site continued to be used as a central ordnance depot after the Second World War and, although the central vehicle kit store closed in 1958, when operations moved to Bicester, it continued to operate as a general stores depot and a vehicle workshop.

The site was renamed Chetwynd Barracks, after Viscount Chetwynd who had been Managing Director of the National Shell Filling Factory, in 1995 and became the home of 49 (East) Brigade.

Under Army 2020, 49 (East) Brigade was merged with 7th Armoured Brigade to become 7th Infantry Brigade and Headquarters East, which relocated to Chetwynd Barracks on 13 February 2015.

Under Future Soldier, the 7th Infantry Brigade became the 7th Light Mechanised Brigade Combat Team, and Headquarters East was amalgamated with Headquarters West Midlands, to form Headquarters Centre.

=== HMS Sherwood ===
==== Chetwynd Barracks ====
HMS Sherwood relocated to Foresters House, Chilwell (part of Chetwynd Barracks) in 2014. HMS Sherwood, which is located more than 50 miles (80 km) from the coast; is the only RNR establishment in the East Midlands.

== Future ==
In late March 2016, the Ministry of Defence announced that the site was to be sold in order to reduce the size of the Defence Estate. In November 2016, the MoD announced that the site would close in 2021. This was subsequently extended to 2024, and once more to 2026.

The Army Reserve Centre, Foresters House, will be retained after closure of the barracks.

== Current units ==
Units stationed at Chetwynd Barracks include:

- 43 Headquarters and Support Squadron Royal Engineers (RE)
- 62 Works Group RE
- 63 Works Group RE
- 65 Works Group RE (Reserve)
- 66 Works Group RE
- Nottinghamshire Band of the Corps of Royal Engineers
- Nottingham Troop, 721 Explosive Ordnance Disposal Squadron, RLC
- HMS Sherwood, Royal Naval Reserve.
  - Nottingham Detachment, Royal Marines Reserve Merseyside

== See also ==
- Chilwell Filling Factory Memorial
