= Albert Hall (engineer) =

English engineer and inventor

Albert Hall born Portsmouth (1878 – 11 February 1941) was an English engineer and inventor, notable for his contribution to improvements in electricity generation and the development of radio and early radar. He served as an apprentice in the Naval Dockyard and gained a scholarship to study at the Royal College of Science. After graduating he was recommended to Dr Sebastian Ziani de Ferranti by Professor John Perry, which resulted in Hall joining Ferranti in 1902.

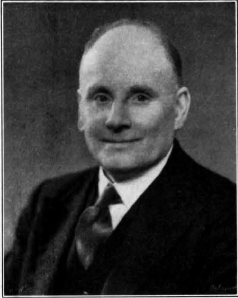
Alber Hall (engineer)

== Early years ==
Dr Ferranti was convinced that the future prime mover for electricity generation would be through a turbine engine employing very high temperatures. Hall's experience in thermodynamics was crucial to the development and patenting of materials able to withstand these high temperatures and stresses. Their collaboration eventually resulted in them producing nickel-protected soft steel turbine blades and machinery for their manufacture. Dr Ferranti had already been working for some years with J & P Coats of Paisley on cotton spinning improvements and it was here that Hall developed a small air-lubricated turbine to replace individual spindle motors, increasing the spindle speed from 6000 rpm to more than 20,000 rpm. According to J F Wilson Coats financed this and also agreed to co-finance the turbine development with Vickers of Sheffield, with Hall supervising the main projects while commuting between Paisley and Sheffield.

== World War I ==
In 1915 Hall was requisitioned by Lord Chetwynd to enter the service of the Ministry of Munitions to act as his assistant. Hall was to help design and build the Largest Shell Factory in England for the manufacture of Amatol and the filling of shells and bombs. During his time as chief engineer there, he lived on site in Orchard Cottage and survived a massive explosion, the cause of which was never determined. Hall's work in Chilwell was acknowledged in 2012 when a commemorative plaque was placed on the re-built property.

== Return to Ferranti ==
In 1919 after the war, he returned to Ferranti and also remained in a consulting capacity to Lord Chetwynd and as a technical adviser to the British Mannesmann Tube company. Around 1922 Dr Ferranti became interested in the science of Radio and sound reproduction; it followed that Hall had to become interested too. His knowledge of operational calculus was well suited to dealing with the mathematical equations encountered in that field and allowed him to make the transition into Radio. At that time manufacturers paid royalties for each valve-holder that they fitted to a radio receiver, so they looked for ways to circumnavigate these royalties wherever they could. With this in mind, it also made sense to manufacture radio components for sale to other radio manufacturers and Hall soon became busy with this too. He was instrumental in designing and producing the AF family inter-valve audio frequency transformers for use in radio receivers. He also worked on valve (vacuum tube) development, producing several patents relating to Radio and component manufacture. In order to augment the sales of components to the amateur home constructor, Hall wrote a book that covered mathematical formula, radio-frequency amplification, loud speakers, power supplies and included many practical suggestions. At the annual Olympia Exhibition in 1929, Ferranti unveiled their first radio developed by Hall marketed as The Standard Model 21 In 1931 Hall was responsible for employing Kenyon Taylor, who went on to become one of Ferranti's prolific inventors.

== Death ==
During World War II, Ferranti were involved in various aspects of radar development and on 11 February 1941, while travelling to an AA gunnery radar site, Hall and his assistant Gilbert Newbigging were killed when the car they were travelling in collided with an army convoy in thick fog.
