= Stapleford Rural District =

Former local government area in the UK

Coordinates: 52.92°N 1.25°W

- History
  - Created: 1894
  - Abolished: 1935
  - Succeeded by: Beeston and Stapleford Urban District
- Status: Rural District
  - HQ: Stapleford, Nottinghamshire

Stapleford was a rural district in Nottinghamshire, England from 1894 to 1935.

It was formed under the Local Government Act 1894 from part of the Shardlow rural sanitary district in Nottinghamshire, and consisted of the parishes of Bramcote, Chilwell, Stapleford and Toton. Two other parishes of Shardlow RSD in Nottinghamshire (Ratcliffe on Soar and Kingston on Soar) were instead administered by Shardlow Rural District.

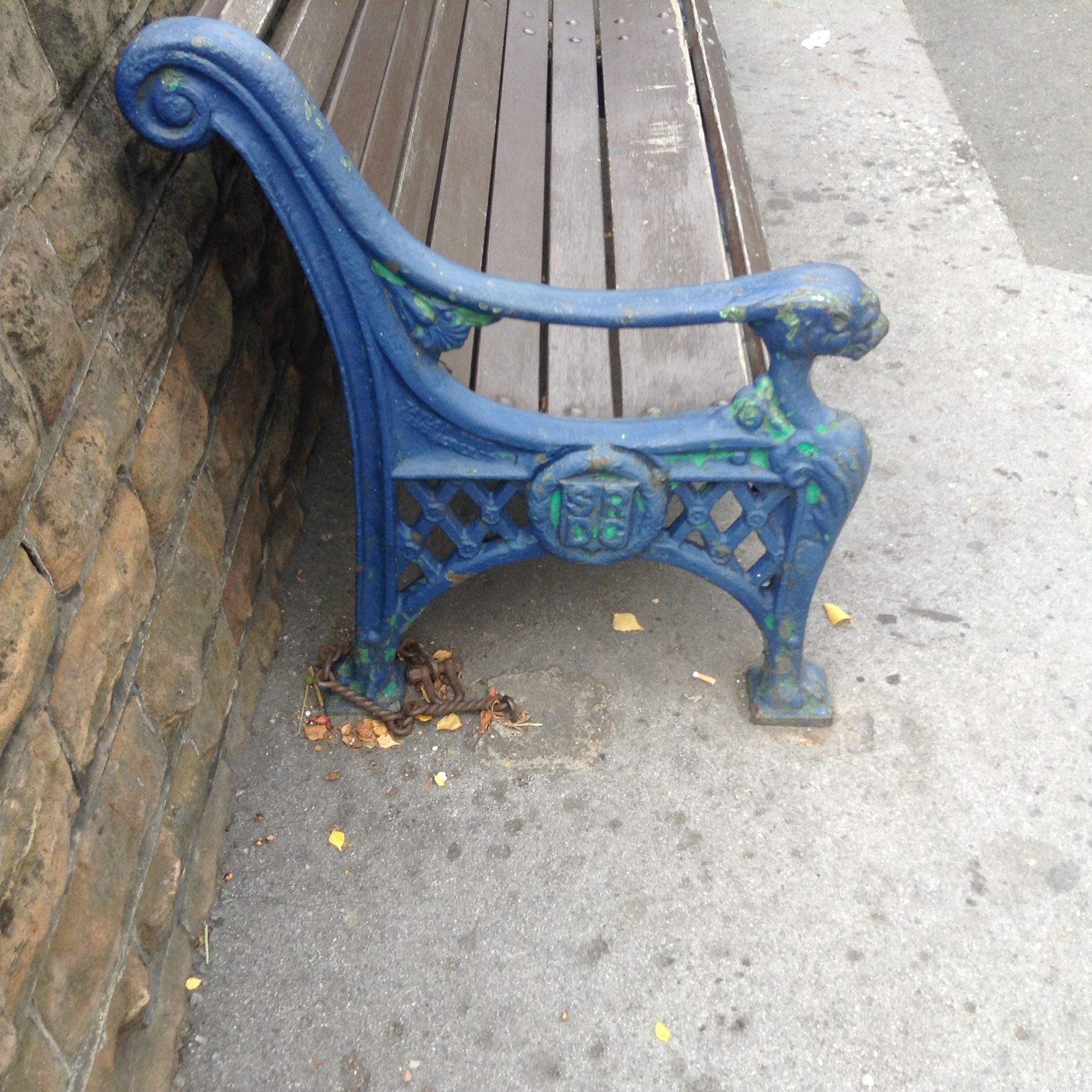
Bench in Stapleford, installed by Stapleford Rural District

It was abolished in 1935 under a County Review Order, becoming part of the Beeston and Stapleford Urban District along with the former Beeston Urban District.
