= Christ Church, Chilwell =

Coordinates: 52°55′14.2″N 01°13′30″W

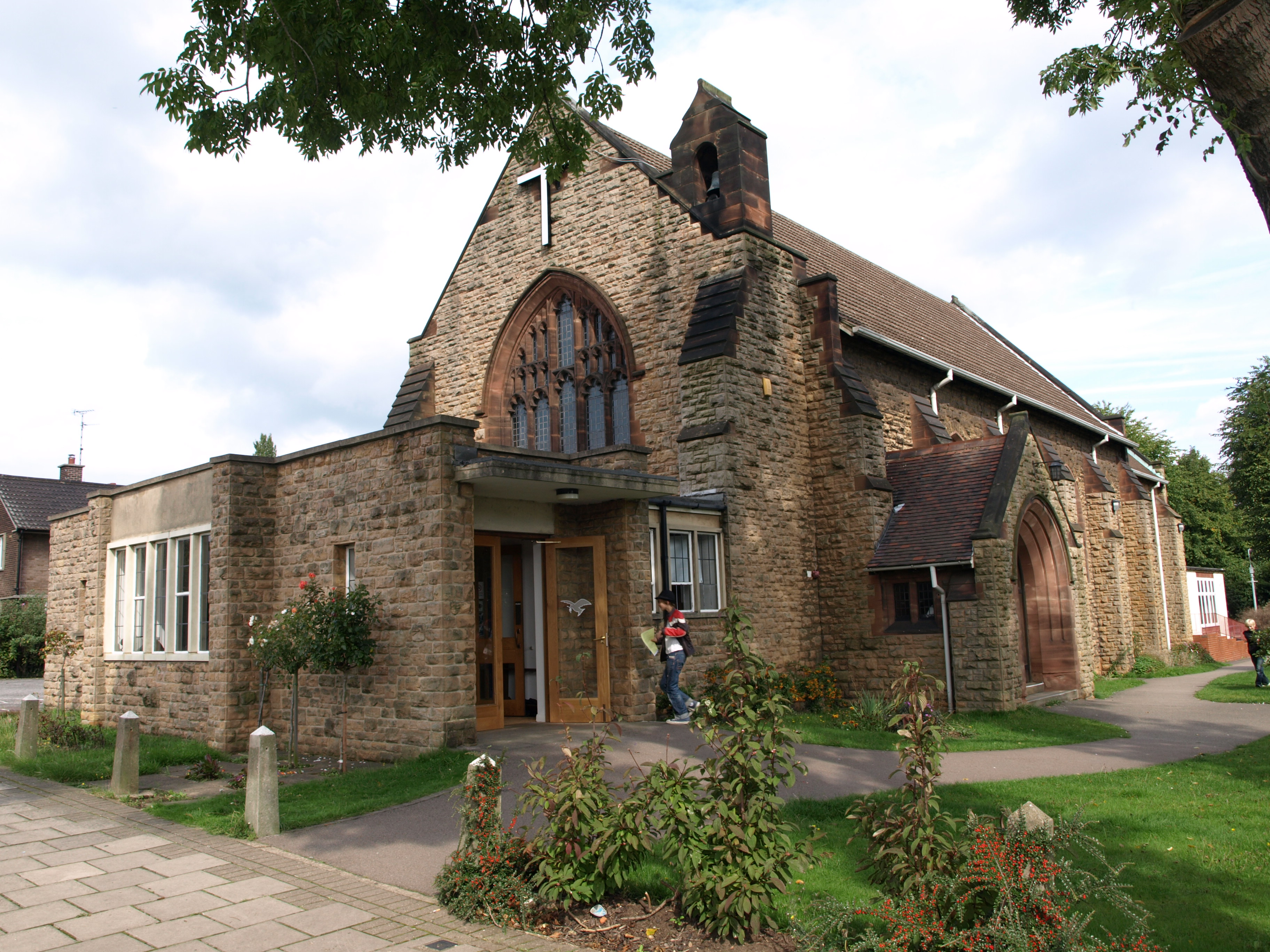
- Christ Church, Chilwell
- Denomination: Church of England
- Churchmanship: Evangelical
- Website: www.christchurchchilwell.org.uk

History
- Dedication: Christ Church

Administration
- Province: York
- Diocese: Southwell and Nottingham
- Parish: Chilwell

Clergy
- Vicar: Rev Andy Tufnell

Christ Church is a parish church in the Church of England in Chilwell, Nottinghamshire.

== History ==
Originally a mission church created from the parish of St. Mary's Church, Attenborough, Christ Church was built between 1901 and 1903. It was consecrated by the Bishop of Southwell Rt. Revd. Edwin Hoskyns on 3 July 1915.

New vestries were added in 1950 and the chancel was added in 1957 by the architect Eric Vernon Royle.

It has a daughter church of St. Barnabas Church, Inham Nook.

== Organ ==
The first organ in the church was a one-manual instrument by Groves of London which was originally erected in St Mary's Church, Attenborough on 12 May 1857.

A two manual organ by Gray and Davison with 16 stops was installed in 1937 The work was carried out by the organist, Norman Buttler of Long Eaton. This organ was overhauled by Ernest Wragg in 1956. In 1986 this organ was moved to St Vincent's Church, Caythorpe.

The current organ was built by Nigel Church in 1984 with modern mechanical action.
