= Broxtowe =

Broxtowe refers to a number of geographic entities, current and historic, in Nottinghamshire, England:

- Broxtowe, Nottingham, a housing estate in Apsley ward, within the City of Nottingham
- Broxtowe (UK Parliament constituency), the constituency with similar boundaries to the borough
- Borough of Broxtowe, a local government area in south west Nottinghamshire
- Broxtowe Wapentake, a previous division of the county, including, but larger than, the current borough
