= Bramcote Lane tram stop =

Nottingham Express Transit tram stop

Bramcote Lane
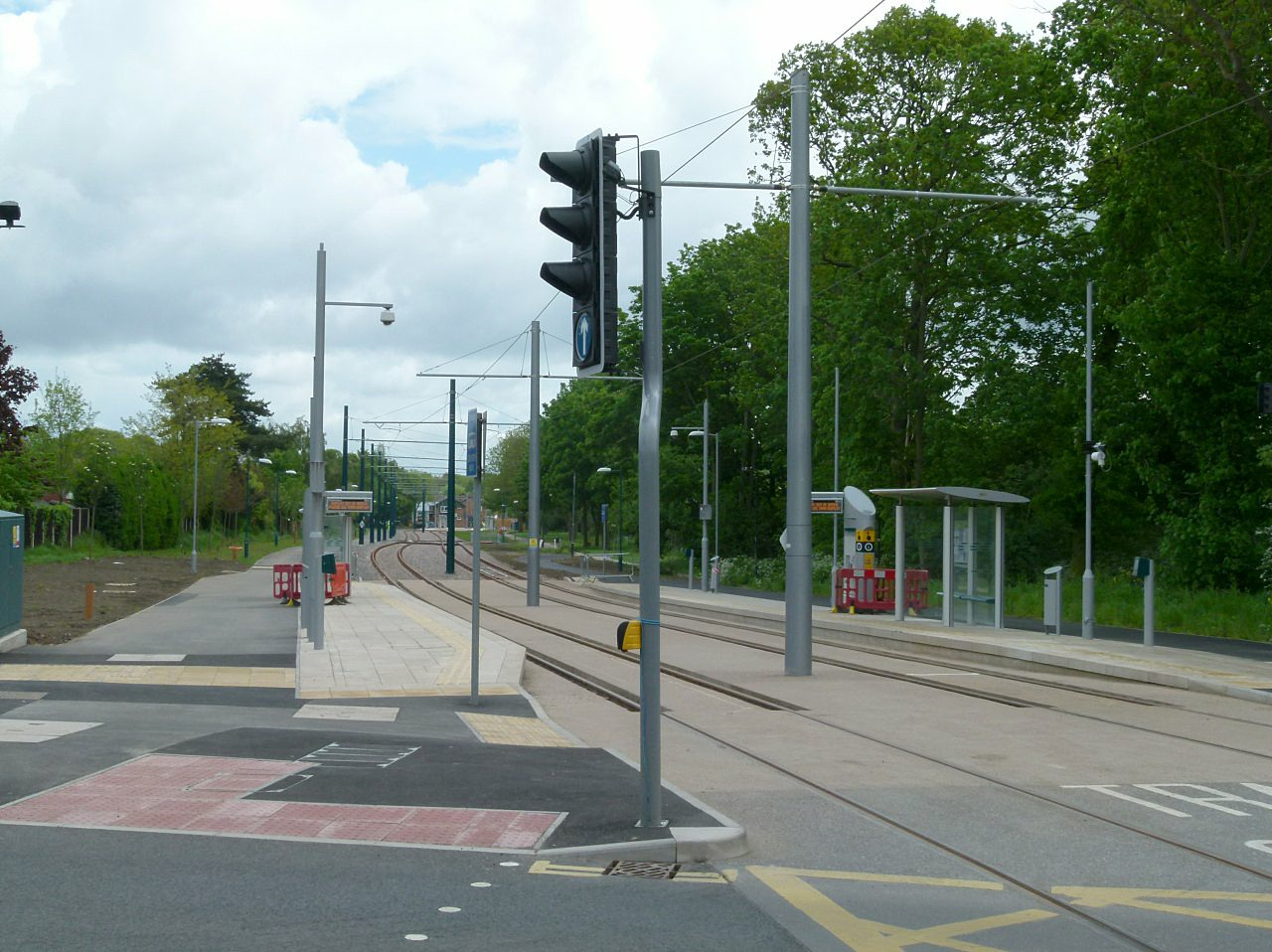

General information
- Location: Chilwell, Broxtowe; England
- Coordinates: 52°55′18″N 1°14′12″W
- System: Nottingham Express Transit tram stop
- Owner: Nottingham Express Transit
- Operator: Nottingham Express Transit
- Line: 1
- Platforms: 2
- Tracks: 2

Construction
- Structure type: At grade; on reservation
- Accessible: Step-free access to platform

Key dates
- 25 August 2015: Opened

Services
Preceding station	NET	Following station
Cator Lane towards Hucknall	Line 1	Eskdale Drive towards Toton Lane
Location
- Location within Nottinghamshire

Bramcote Lane is a tram stop on the Nottingham Express Transit (NET) network, in the district of Broxtowe and suburb of Chilwell. It is situated on reserved track close to a crossing over Bramcote Lane, and has side platforms flanking the track. Trams run at frequencies that vary between 4 and 8 trams per hour, depending on the day and time of day.

Bramcote Lane stop opened on 25 August 2015, along with the rest of NET's phase two.
