= Beeston Urban District =

Urban district in Nottinghamshire, England

Coordinates: 52°56′N 1°13′W

Beeston
- History
  - Created: 1894
  - Abolished: 1935
  - Succeeded by: Beeston and Stapleford Urban District
- Status: Urban District
  - HQ: Beeston, Nottinghamshire

Beeston was an urban district in Nottinghamshire, England, from 1894 to 1935.

The urban district was created by the Local Government Act 1894 on the borders of the Beeston Civil Parish and the Beeston Urban Sanitary District. It bordered the county borough of Nottingham in the north east, Stapleford Rural District in the north west, two different disconnected parts of the Basford Rural District to the north and south, and to the west the South East Derbyshire Rural District and Long Eaton in Derbyshire.

In 1935 it was merged by a County Review Order with Stapleford Rural District into the Beeston and Stapleford Urban District, and is now part of Broxtowe Borough Council.

== Beeston Urban District Council ==
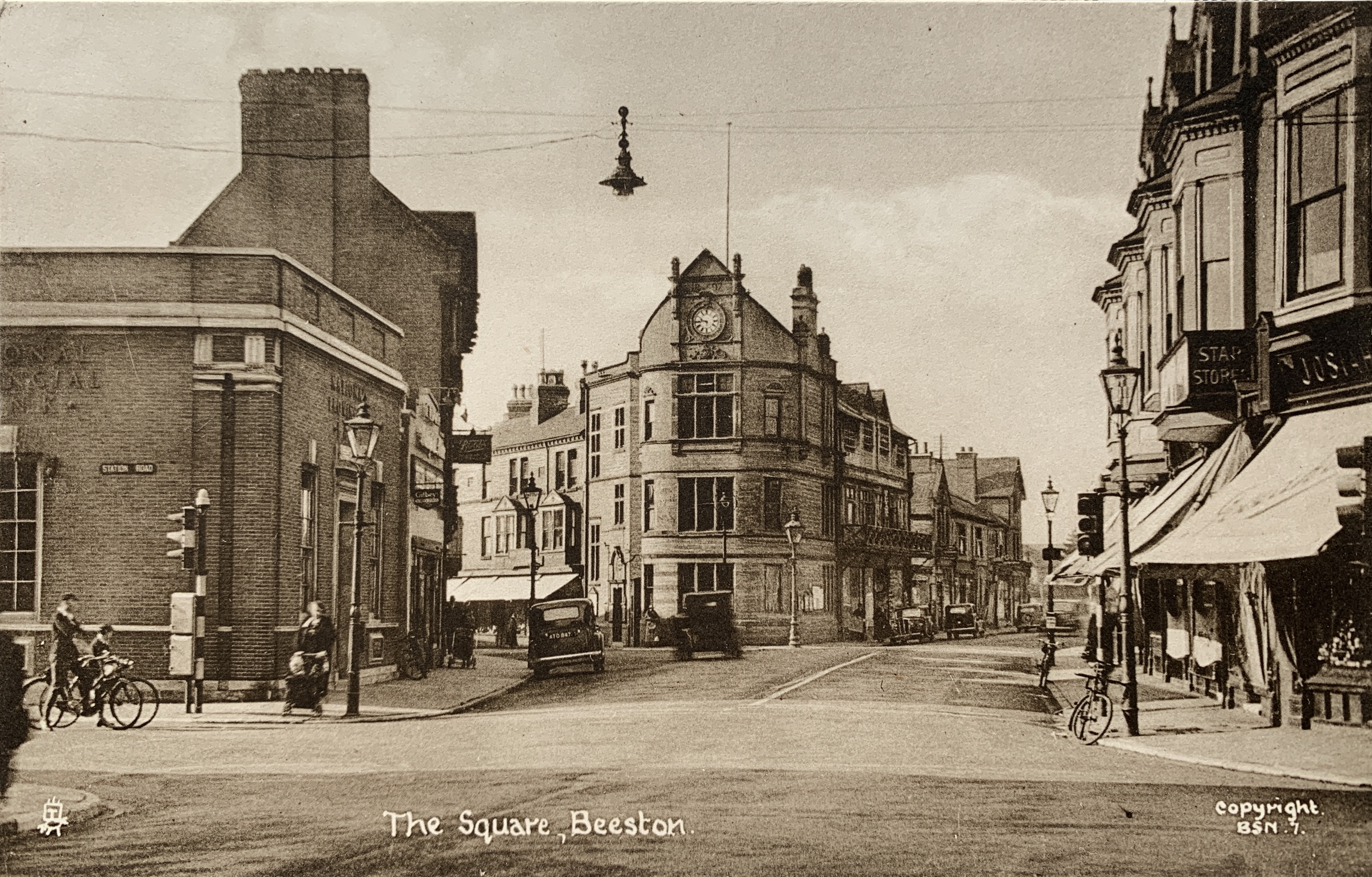
The council offices of Beeston Urban District Council erected in 1897 at the junction of Church Street and Chilwell Road

On the formation of the Urban District area in 1894, a council was established consisting of 15 elected officials. This replaced the former Beeston Local Board. After the election on 17 December 1894, the council comprised 10 Conservative councillors and 5 Liberal councillors. The first meetings of the Council were held at the Board Schools until the council built its own offices on Church Street, Beeston in 1897.

== Chairmen of Beeston Urban District Council ==
- Benjamin Collington 1894 - 1895
- W.A. Wade 1895 - 1896
- W.A. Wade 1897 - 1898
- J.R. Anderson 1898 - 1899
- George Wilkinson 1899 - 1900
- George Wilkinson 1900 - 1901
- George Burrows 1901 - 1902
- W. Robinson J.P. 1902 - 1903
- Joseph Collis Walker 1903?
- William Henry Pratt 1905 - 1906
- A.E.W. May ca. 1906
- George Burrows 1907 - 1908
- T.W. Bannister 1908 - 1909
- William Henry Pratt 1910 - 1911
- John Roger Anderson 1912 - 1913
- George Burrows 1913 - 1914
- W.H. Spencer 1914 - 1915
- W. Thomas 1915 - 1916
- Charles Porter Walker 1916 - 1917
- Joseph Heard 1917 - 1918
- W.H. George 1918 - 1919
- George Burrows 1919 - 1921
- William Thums 1921 - 1922
- George Burrows 1922 - 1923
- William Herbert George 1924 - 1925
- E. Littlewood 1925 - 1926
- Robert Marvin 1927 - 1928
- Isaac Thornhill 1928 - 1929
- William Thums 1929 - 1930
- F. Wilkinson 1930 - 1931
- Charles Porter Walker 1931 - 1932
- F.M. Fisher 1932 - 1933
- J.R. Anderson 1933 - 1934
- Joseph Heard 1934 - 1935
