= Eskdale Drive tram stop =

Nottingham Express Transit tram stop

Eskdale Drive
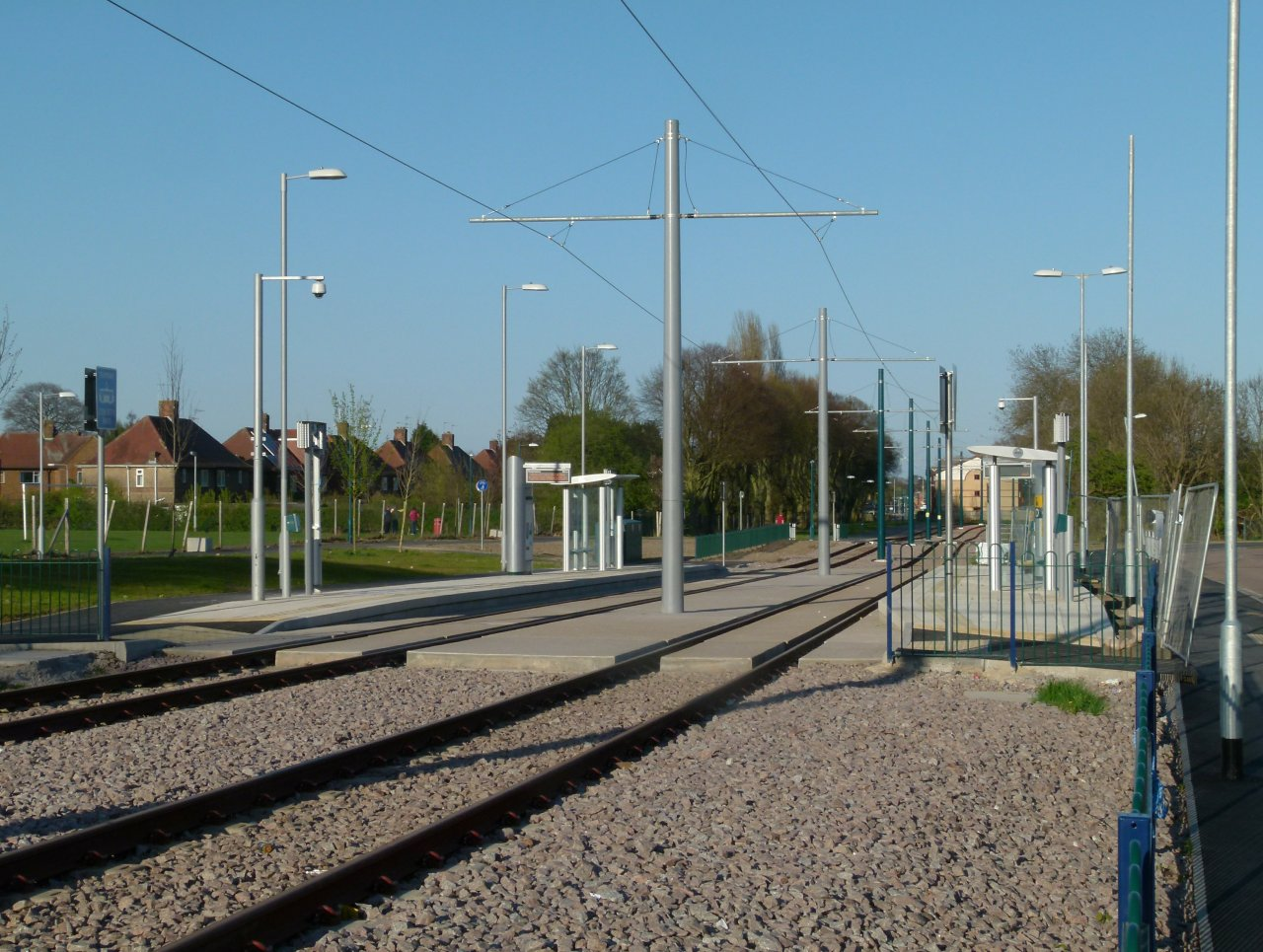

General information
- Location: Chilwell, Broxtowe; England
- Coordinates: 52°55′13″N 1°14′35″W
- System: Nottingham Express Transit tram stop
- Owner: Nottingham Express Transit
- Operator: Nottingham Express Transit
- Line: 1
- Platforms: 2
- Tracks: 2

Construction
- Structure type: At grade; on reservation
- Accessible: Step-free access to platform

Key dates
- 25 August 2015: Opened

Services
Preceding station	NET	Following station
Bramcote Lane towards Hucknall	Line 1	Inham Road towards Toton Lane
Location
- Location within Nottinghamshire

Eskdale Drive is a tram stop on the Nottingham Express Transit (NET) network, in the district of Broxtowe and suburb of Chilwell. It is situated on reserved track adjacent to Eskdale Drive, and has side platforms flanking the track. Trams run at frequencies that vary between 4 and 8 trams per hour, depending on the day and time of day.

Eskdale Drive stop opened on 25 August 2015, along with the rest of NET's phase two.
