= High Road – Central College tram stop =

Nottingham Express Transit tram stop

High Road – Central College
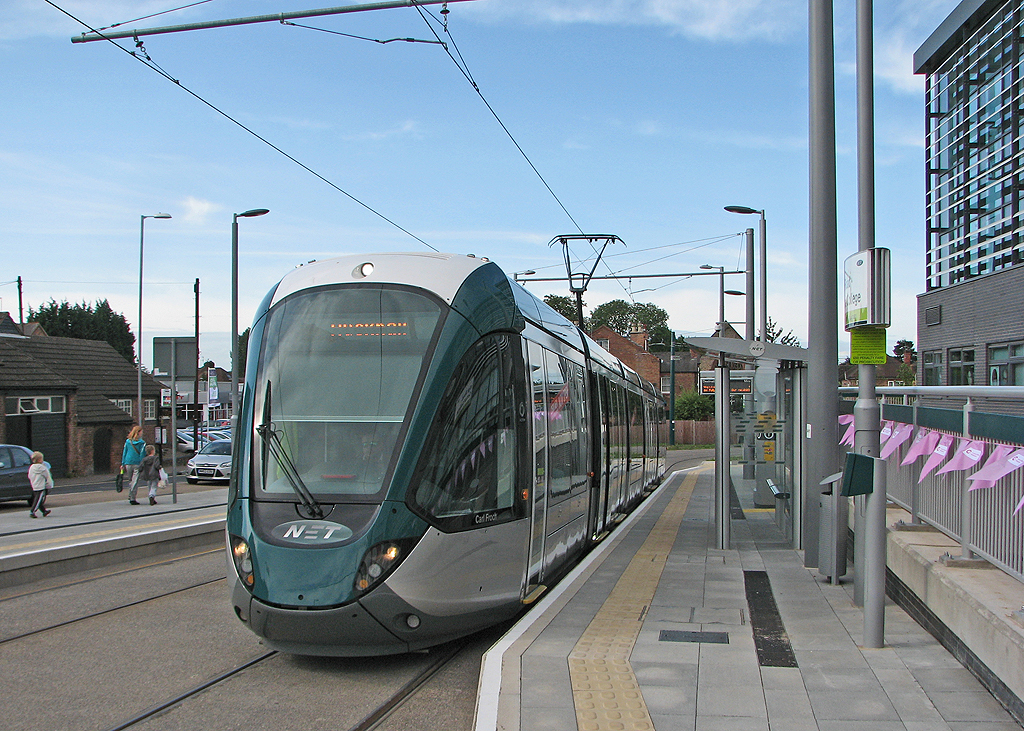

General information
- Location: Nottingham College, Beeston, Broxtowe; England
- Coordinates: 52°55′16″N 1°13′23″W
- System: Nottingham Express Transit tram stop
- Owner: Nottingham Express Transit
- Operator: Nottingham Express Transit
- Line: 1
- Platforms: 2
- Tracks: 2

Construction
- Structure type: At grade; on reservation
- Accessible: Step-free access to platform

Key dates
- 25 August 2015: Opened

Services
| Preceding station | NET | Following station |
|---|---|---|
| Chilwell Road towards Hucknall | Line 1 | Cator Lane towards Toton Lane |
Location
- Location within Nottinghamshire

High Road – Central College is a tram stop on the Nottingham Express Transit (NET) network, in the district of Broxtowe, East Midlands, United Kingdom. The stop lies immediately to the Beeston side of the boundary between the suburbs of Chilwell and Beeston. The original proposed name for the stop was Castle College, and some publications still use that name.

The stop is situated on reserved track alongside High Road and in front of the former Beeston campus of Nottingham College (now Graduation House), and has side platforms flanking the track. Trams run at frequencies that vary between 4 and 8 trams per hour, depending on the day and time of day.

High Road – Central College stop opened on 25 August 2015, along with the rest of NET's phase two.
