= Chilwell Road tram stop =

Tram stop on Nottingham Express Transit in England

Chilwell Road
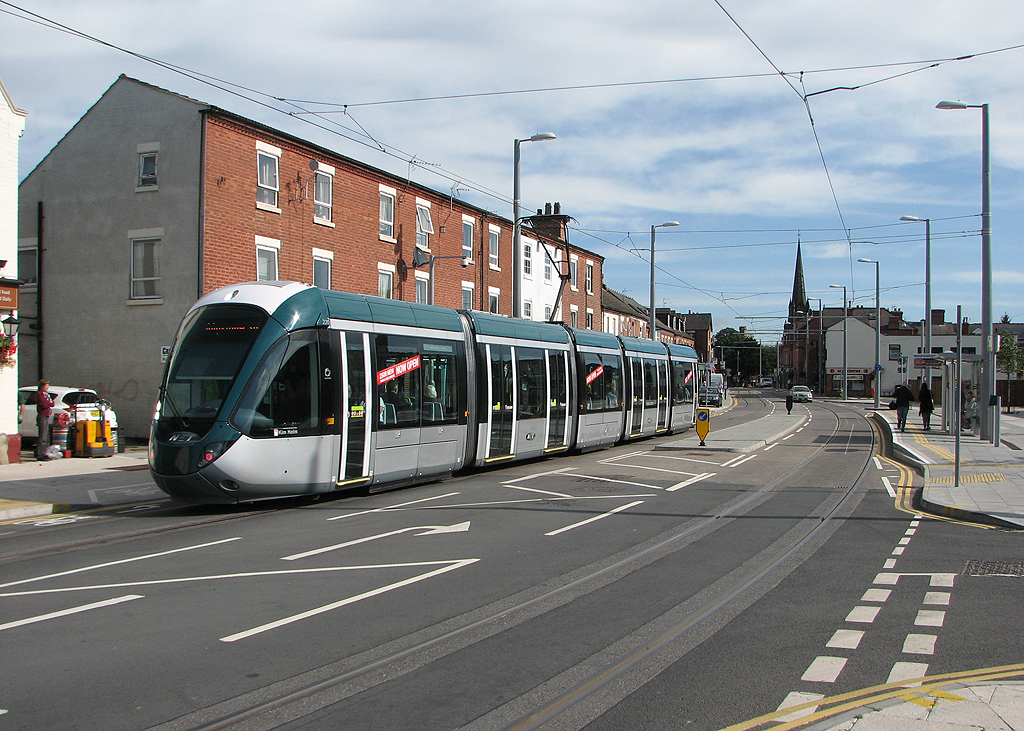

General information
- Location: Beeston, Broxtowe; England
- Coordinates: 52°55′22″N 1°13′13″W
- System: Nottingham Express Transit tram stop
- Owner: Nottingham Express Transit
- Operator: Nottingham Express Transit
- Line: 1
- Platforms: 2
- Tracks: 2

Construction
- Structure type: At grade; on street
- Accessible: Step-free access to platform

Key dates
- 25 August 2015: Opened

Services
Preceding station	NET	Following station
Beeston Town Centre towards Hucknall	Line 1	High Road – Central College towards Toton Lane
Location
- Location within Nottinghamshire

Chilwell Road is a tram stop on the Nottingham Express Transit (NET) network, in the district of Broxtowe and town of Beeston. It is situated on street track within Chilwell Road, and has side platforms flanking the track, together with a traffic island between the tracks. Trams run at frequencies that vary between 4 and 8 trams per hour, depending on the day and time of day.

Chilwell Road stop opened on 25 August 2015, along with the rest of NET's phase two.
