= Walter Richard Parker =

Royal Marine and English recipient of the Victoria Cross

- Born: 20 September 1881; Grantham, Lincolnshire, England
- Died: 28 November 1936 (aged 55); Stapleford, Nottinghamshire, England
- Burial place: Stapleford Cemetery
- Military career
- Allegiance: United Kingdom
- Branch: Royal Marines
- Service years: 1914–1916
- Rank: Lance corporal
- Units: Royal Marine Light Infantry
- Conflicts: First World War: Gallipoli campaign
- Awards: Victoria Cross

Walter Richard Parker, VC (20 September 1881 – 28 November 1936) was a British ironworker, Royal Marine, and a recipient of the Victoria Cross, the highest award for gallantry in the face of the enemy that can be awarded to British and Commonwealth forces.

== First World War ==
Parker was 33 years old, and a lance corporal in the Royal Marine Light Infantry, Royal Marines, Royal Naval Division during the First World War when the following deed took place for which he was awarded the Victoria Cross.

On the night of 30 April/1 May 1915 at Gaba Tepe, Gallipoli, Lance Corporal Parker, a volunteer stretcher-bearer, went out with a party of NCOs and men to take ammunition, water and medical stores to an isolated trench containing about 40 men and several wounded. There were no communication trenches leading to the trench, and several men had already been killed in an attempt to reach it.

After crossing an area of about 400 yards swept by machine-gun and rifle fire, Lance Corporal Parker was alone, the rest of the party having been killed or wounded. On his arrival he gave assistance to the wounded and when the trench was finally evacuated early the next morning, he helped to remove and attend the casualties, although he himself was seriously wounded.

Parker never fully recovered from his wounds, and was invalided out of the service in June 1916. The award appeared in the London Gazette on 22 June 1917; the lengthy delay before the award being explained by the commanding officer, adjutant, sergeant major and the company commander all being wounded at the time of the action for which Parker was awarded the medal. The account of the award also noted that Parker had consistently displayed bravery and energy in the three previous days during a particularly difficult time as commander the battalion's stretcher bearers, when almost every wounded man had to be evacuated over open ground and under fire.

== Death and legacy ==
Parker died, aged 55, at Stapleford near Nottingham and is buried in the local cemetery. A memorial service to him is held annually at Stapleford by the local Royal Marines Association on the Sunday nearest 30 April. There is a paved area in Stapleford town centre named in his honour.

Parker's Victoria Cross is displayed at the Royal Marines Museum, in Southsea, England.

== Bibliography ==
- Snelling, Stephen (2012) [1995]. Gallipoli. VCs of the First World War. The History Press. ISBN 978-0752456539.
