= Inham Road tram stop =

Inham Road
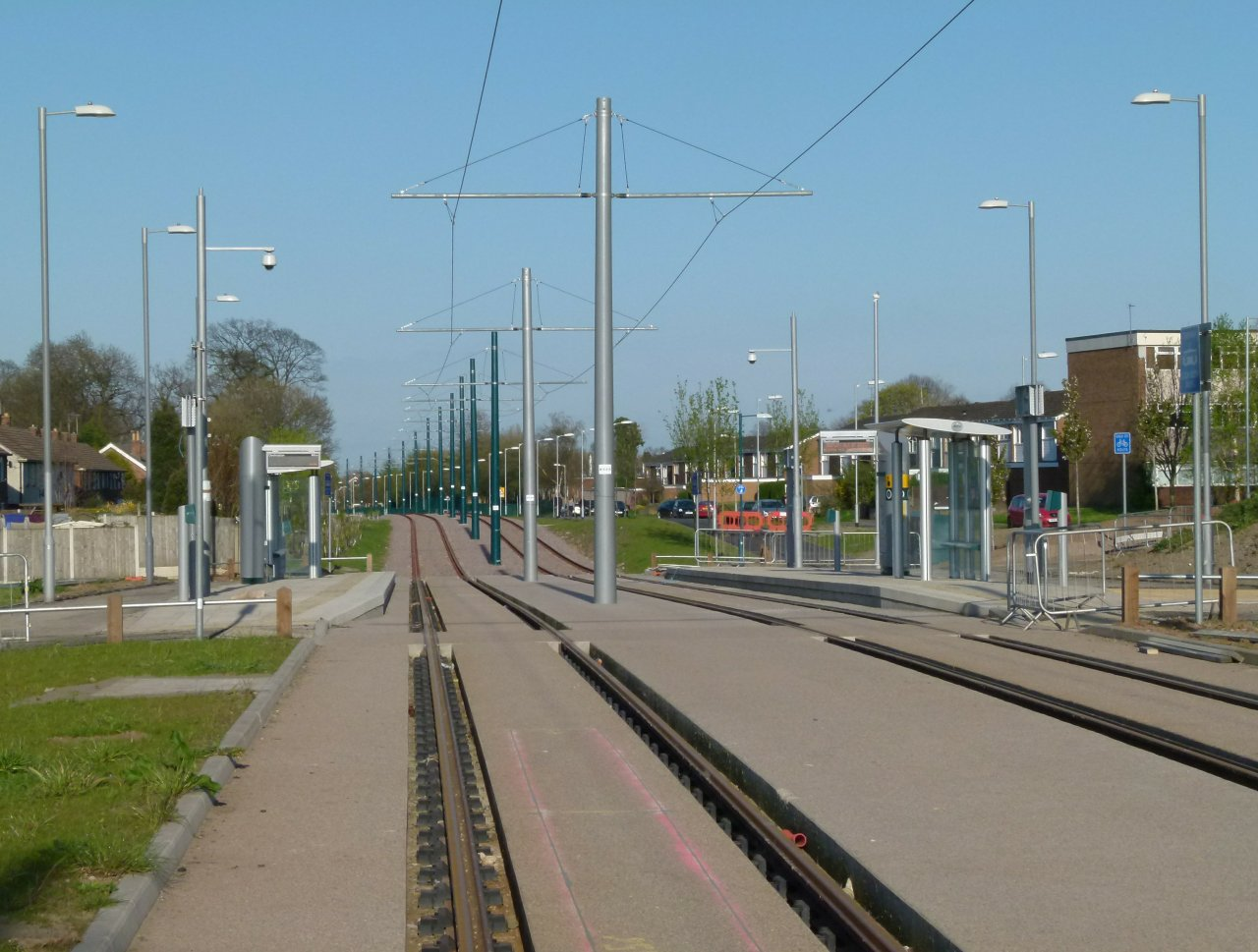

General information
- Location: Chilwell, Broxtowe; England
- Coordinates: 52°55′10″N 1°15′05″W
- System: Nottingham Express Transit tram stop
- Owner: Nottingham Express Transit
- Operator: Nottingham Express Transit
- Line: 1
- Platforms: 2
- Tracks: 2

Construction
- Structure type: At grade; on reservation
- Accessible: Step-free access to platform

Key dates
- 25 August 2015: Opened

Services
| Preceding station | NET | Following station |
|---|---|---|
| Eskdale Drive towards Hucknall | Line 1 | Toton Lane Terminus |
Location
- Location within Nottinghamshire

Inham Road is a tram stop on the Nottingham Express Transit (NET) network, in the district of Broxtowe and suburb of Chilwell. It is on reserved track close to a crossing over Inham Road, and has side platforms flanking the track. Trams run at frequencies that vary between four and eight trams per hour, depending on the day and time of day.

Inham Road stop opened on 25 August 2015, along with the rest of NET's phase two.
