= Nigel Church =

British organ builder

Nigel B. Church (c.1940) is a British organ builder who was based in Stamfordham, Northumberland from 1971 to 1998.

== Career ==
He started building organs as Church and Company in Stamfordham in 1971 and concentrated on new build organs with mechanical action.

Although some restorations of older organs were undertaken (mostly in the area around Durham near their workshop) Church's small organ-building company gradually became best known for effective design of small organs (of one or two manuals) in the neo-baroque style then fashionable, often featuring modernist architectural design and casework - in strong contrast to the elaborate, noble and grand post-Victorian aesthetics of most of Britain's organ stock. As such, the firm's legacy constitutes a modest but important ingredient in the spread of the 20th Century European Organ reform movement into the UK.

The firm ceased trading in 2000. Many of Church's organs are still in regular use.

== Organs built ==
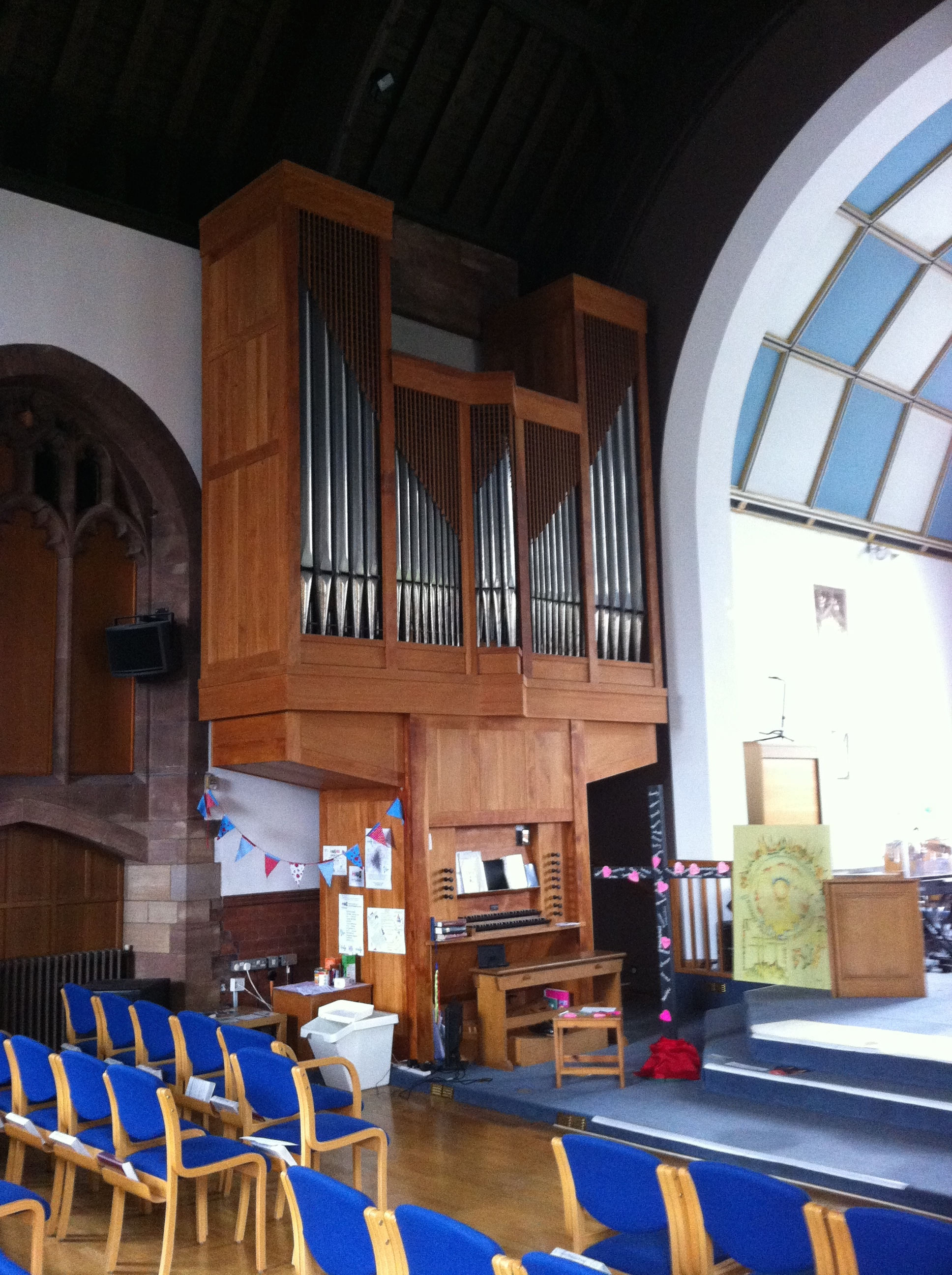
Organ in Christ Church, Chilwell 1984

- University of Salford 1972
- Episcopal Church, Bearsdon 1972
- All Saints' Church, Swallowfield, Bucks 1972
- United Reformed Church, Ponteland 1973
- St. Anselm Hall, Manchester University 1973
- Newcastle Royal Grammar School 1973
- All Saints St. Pauls, Walden. Hertfordshire 1974
- St Willibrord with All Saints, Newcastle upon Tyne 1974
- St Paul's Church, Winlaton, Durham 1974
- All Saints' Church, The Oval, Pin Green, Stevenage 1974
- Parish Church of Marske by the Sea, Yorkshire 1975
- St Michael's Church, Breaston 1975 now in English Martyrs Church, Alvaston, Derbyshire
- St James and St Basil's Church, Fenham, Newcastle upon Tyne 1975
- St. James' Church, Scarborough 1976
- Martin Luther Church, Newcastle Upon Tyne 1976
- The Church of the Holy Saviour, Lemington, Tyne and Wear 1975
- Church of St. Mary Magdalene, Hucknall 1976 then at Sedbergh School - now at SS Peter & Paul RC Church, Lincoln
- St George's Church, Hartlepool 1976
- Trent College Chapel, Nottingham 1976
- House Organ, Private Residence, Kings Langley 1977
- House Organ Private Residence Hertfordshire 1977
- St Matthew's Church, Newcastle upon Tyne 1977
- St Giles' Church, Sandiacre 1977
- St Mary's Church, Disley, Cheshire 1977
- Saxon Church, Escomb, Durham 1977
- King's Hall Newcastle University 1978
- St Andrews, Sutton Park, Hull 1978
- St Peter ad Vincula, Thornaby-on-Tees 1978
- St Michael's Church, Coxwold, North Yorkshire 1978
- St Peter and St Paul, Drax Yorkshire 1979
- Church of Our Lady and St Columba, Wallsend 1979
- St Cuthbert's Redmarshall Co Durham 1979
- St Helen's Church, Hoveton, Norfolk 1979
- St John of Beverley School, Beverley, Humberside 1979
- St Robert of Newminster, Morpeth, Northumberland 1980
- Sacred Heart Church, Mukoquee Oklahoma USA 1980
- Bryanston School, Dorset 1980
- United Reformed Church, Aston Tirrold, Berkshire 1980
- St Edward the Confessor's Church, Dringhouses, Yorkshire 1980
- St Mary's Cathedral, Newcastle upon Tyne 1981 - moved to Ss Mary & Joseph RC church, Poplar, East London in 2012.
- St Cuthbert's Roman Catholic School, Newcastle upon Tyne 1981
- Church of the Holy Cross, Fenham Newcastle 1981
- Houston and Killellan Kirk, Strathclyde 1981
- St Joseph's Church, Maidenhead 1981
- St Hugh of Lincoln, Timperley, Greater Manchester 1981
- Hartley Hall of Residence, Royal Northern College of Music, Manchester 1981
- St Mary's Church, Harborne, Birmingham 1982
- St James' Church, Inverleith Row, Edinburgh 1982
- St Mary Magdalene's Church, Trimdon 1982
- Box organ, Aberdeen University 1983
- Priory Church of St Hilda, Sneaton Castle 1983
- St Mary the Virgin, Denham, Buckinghamshire 1983
- Lylesand Church Paisley, Strathclyde 1983
- St Alban's Church, Chester Road, Macclesfield 1983
- Arley Hall Chapel, Cheshire 1983
- Martin Luther Church, Middlesbrough 1984
- St George's Church, Wigan 1984
- All Saints’ Church, Friern Barnet, London 1984
- Liverpool Cathedral 1984
- Christ Church, Chilwell 1984
- Christ Church Rochester New York. USA 1985
- St Paul's Church Geneva New York. USA 1985
- Heathfield School, Ascot Berkshire 1985
- St. Andrews Church, Bolam Northumberland 1985
- Box Organ, Private Residence, Kew London 1985
- Holy Trinity Church, Old Bewick 1986
- Barnard Castle School Chapel, Durham 1986
- 55 Courthill Avenue, Glasgow 1987
- Chetham's School, Greater Manchester 1987
- St Thomas of Aquin and Stephen Harding, Market Drayton 1987
- Birmingham Conservatoire 1987
- St Joseph's Church, Westgate, Wetherby 1987

Donald Joyce residence, New York 1985
