= Beeston and Stapleford Urban District =

Urban district in Nottinghamshire, England

Coordinates: 52.93°N 1.24°W

Beeston and Stapleford
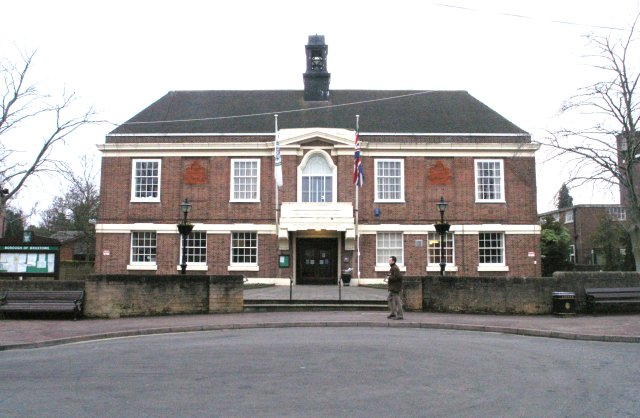
- Beeston Town Hall

- Beeston and Stapleford Urban District shown within Nottinghamshire in 1970
- History
  - Created: 1935
  - Abolished: 1974
  - Succeeded by: Broxtowe
- Status: Urban District
- Government
  - HQ: Beeston, Nottinghamshire
  - Motto: Domine Salvum Fac Regem

Beeston and Stapleford was an urban district in Nottinghamshire, England, from 1935 to 1974.

It was created by a County Review Order. Beeston had previously been part of Beeston Urban District itself, to which was added the entirety of the Stapleford Rural District, consisting of the parishes of Bramcote, Chilwell, Stapleford and Toton. The urban district bordered the county borough of Nottingham in the north west, two disconnected parts of the Basford Rural District to the north and south, and to the west the South East Derbyshire Rural District and Long Eaton in Derbyshire.

The council built itself Beeston Town Hall on Foster Avenue in Beeston at a cost of £18,500 (equivalent to £1,076,600 in 2025) designed by the architectural firm of Evans, Clark and Woollatt which opened on 24 March 1938.

Since 1974 it has formed part of the Broxtowe borough.

== Chairmen of the council ==
- W. Ireland 1935–1936
- Alfred Redwood 1936–1937
- W.V. Potts 1937–1938
- J. Taylor 1938–1939
- Fitzherbert Wright 1939–1940
- J.T. Welch 1940–1941
- Joseph Heard 1942–1943
- Douglas Leonard Booth 1943–1944
- W. Ireland 1944–1945
- Mrs. E Littlewood 1945–1946
- Frederick William Litchfield 1946–1947
- H.R. Winstanley 1947–1948
- W. Ireland 1948–1949
- T.L.V. White 1949–1950
- G.H. Peel 1950–1951
- R. Banks 1952–1953
- F. Stowell 1953–1954
- Alex T. Oldham 1955–1956
- F. Scothern 1956–1957
- Victor H. Oade 1957–1958
- G.H. Peel 1958–1959
- J. William (Bill) Plowman 1959–1960
- Mrs. F. Wilson 1960–1961
- F.T. Brough 1961–1962
- C.W. Anderson 1962–1963
- Mrs. F.E. Bradley 1963–1964
- J.R. Oldershaw 1964–1965
- N. Challenger 1965–1966
- N.B. Fortune 1966–1967
- Alex T. Oldham 1967–1968
- F. Scothern 1968–1969
- E. Ray Hudson 1969–1970
- John Sutton 1970–1971
- Gordon Mee 1971–1972
- Harold Clifford 1972–1973
- Grenville Stanley 1973–1974
