= St Barnabas Church, Inham Nook =

Parish church of the Church of England in Chilwell, Nottinghamshire

Coordinates: 52°55′35″N 01°13′27″W

St. Barnabas Inham Nook
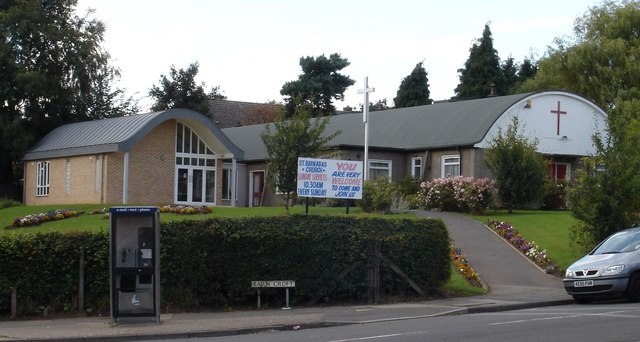
- St. Barnabas Inham Nook
- Denomination: Church of England
- Churchmanship: Evangelical
- Website: https://www.chilwellparish.org.uk/st-barnabas/

History
- Dedication: St. Barnabas

Administration
- Province: York
- Diocese: Southwell and Nottingham
- Parish: Chilwell

Clergy
- Vicar: Revd Ryan Mellor

St. Barnabas, Inham Nook is a parish church in the Church of England in Chilwell, Nottinghamshire.

== History ==
St Barnabas, Inham Nook, stands at the top of Inham Road, at the western end of the parish of Chilwell. It was opened in 1957 as a daughter church of Christ Church, Chilwell, to serve a new housing estate, Inham Nook, built after the Second World War II. The building on the site today was originally intended as a church hall, with a large open space left adjoining Inham Road for the church. It became clear that funding would not be available for a new church, and at various times in the past fifty years the building has been modified to provide suitable church and community facilities. A major extension completed in 1999 has converted the building into a main hallway, used as a church and, during the week, community area (with shutters to close off the sanctuary), and rooms, a kitchen and modern toilet facilities to provide space for additional church and community activities.

== Sources ==
- The Buildings of England, Nottinghamshire, Nikolaus Pevsner
