= National Shell Filling Factory, Chilwell =

United Kingdom explosives filling factory

Coordinates: 52.9118°N 1.2450°W

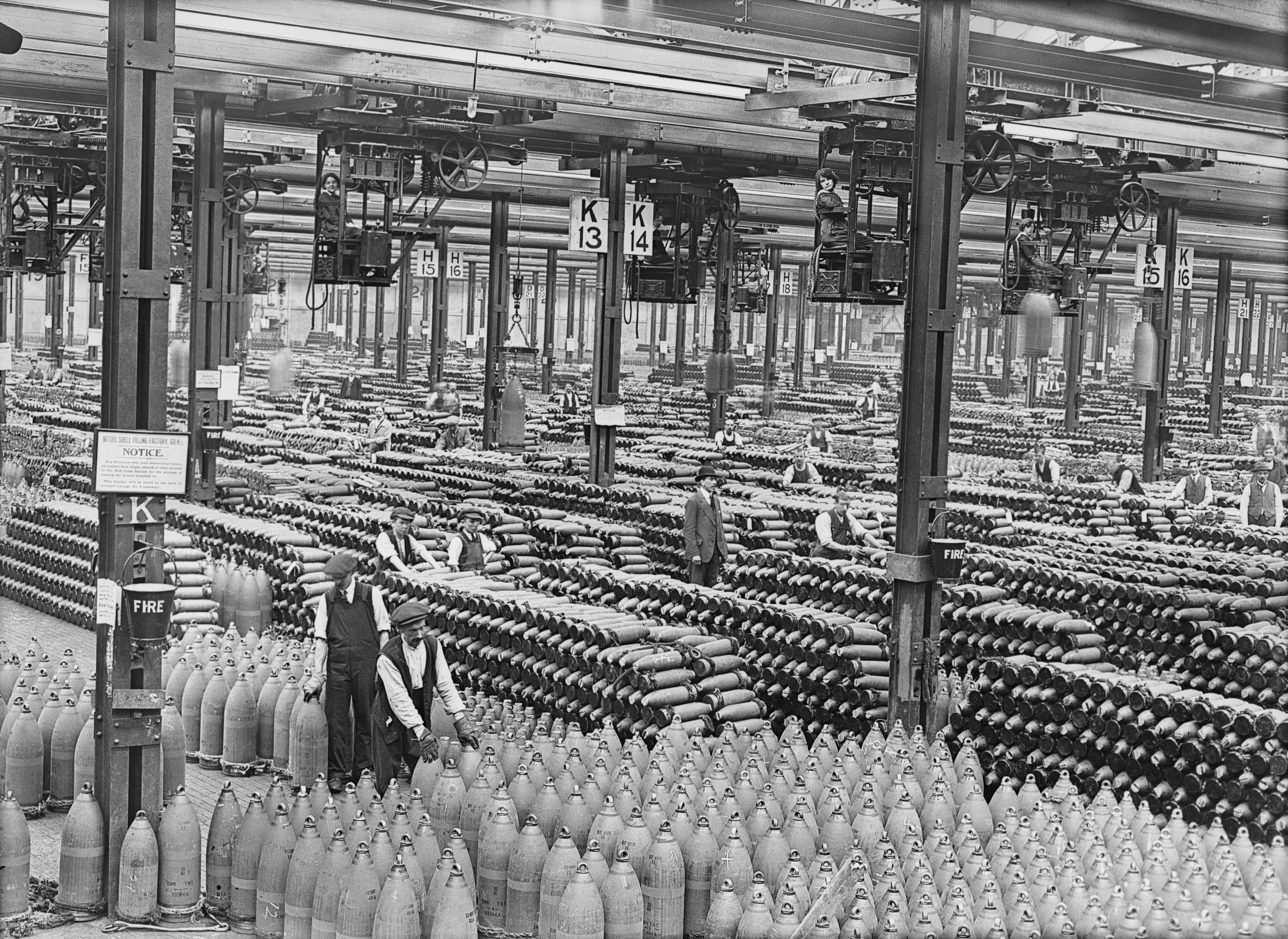
Stacks of shells in the National Shell Filling Factory, Chilwell during World War I.

The National Shell Filling Factory, Chilwell, was a World War I United Kingdom Government-owned explosives filling factory. Its formal title was National Filling Factory No. 6. It was located near Chilwell, at that time a village, in Nottinghamshire on the main road from Nottingham to Ashby de la Zouch. During the Great War it filled some 19 million shells with high explosives.

== Foundation of the Shell Filling Factory ==
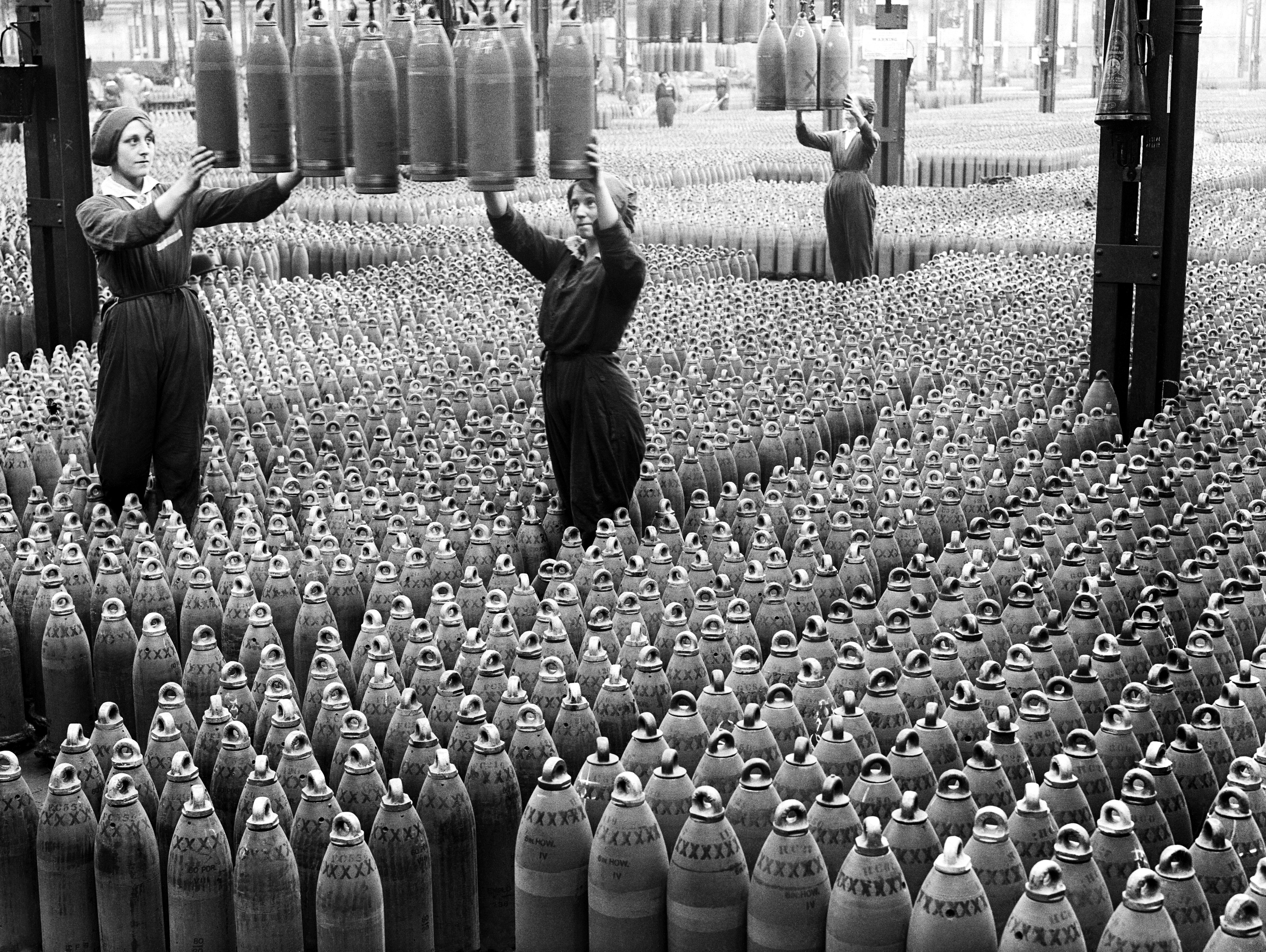
Women workers with 6-inch howitzer shells at Chilwell, July 1917

The factory was created as a result of the Shell Crisis of 1915. At the beginning of World War I shells were filled with Lyddite, but this needed imported raw materials, and so trinitrotoluene (TNT) was adopted. TNT was expensive to make and was in short supply, so Amatol, a mixture of various proportions of TNT and Ammonium nitrate, was adopted instead.

On 20 August 1915 Godfrey Chetwynd, 8th Viscount Chetwynd, was given the task of designing, building and superintending the running of a factory to fill large-calibre shells with Amatol. He requisitioned the services of Albert Hall of Ferranti, who served as his chief engineer. The Chilwell site was apparently selected as it was close to a railway line from which a siding connection could be constructed, and sheltered from surrounding areas by hills.

From the start, women were employed. This may have been another reason for the choice of location, as there was a tradition of women working in local textile factories in the nearby towns. Owing to their exposure to the explosives, many women's skin turned yellow, and they were known as the "Chilwell Canaries" or "Canary Girls".

== The 1918 explosion ==
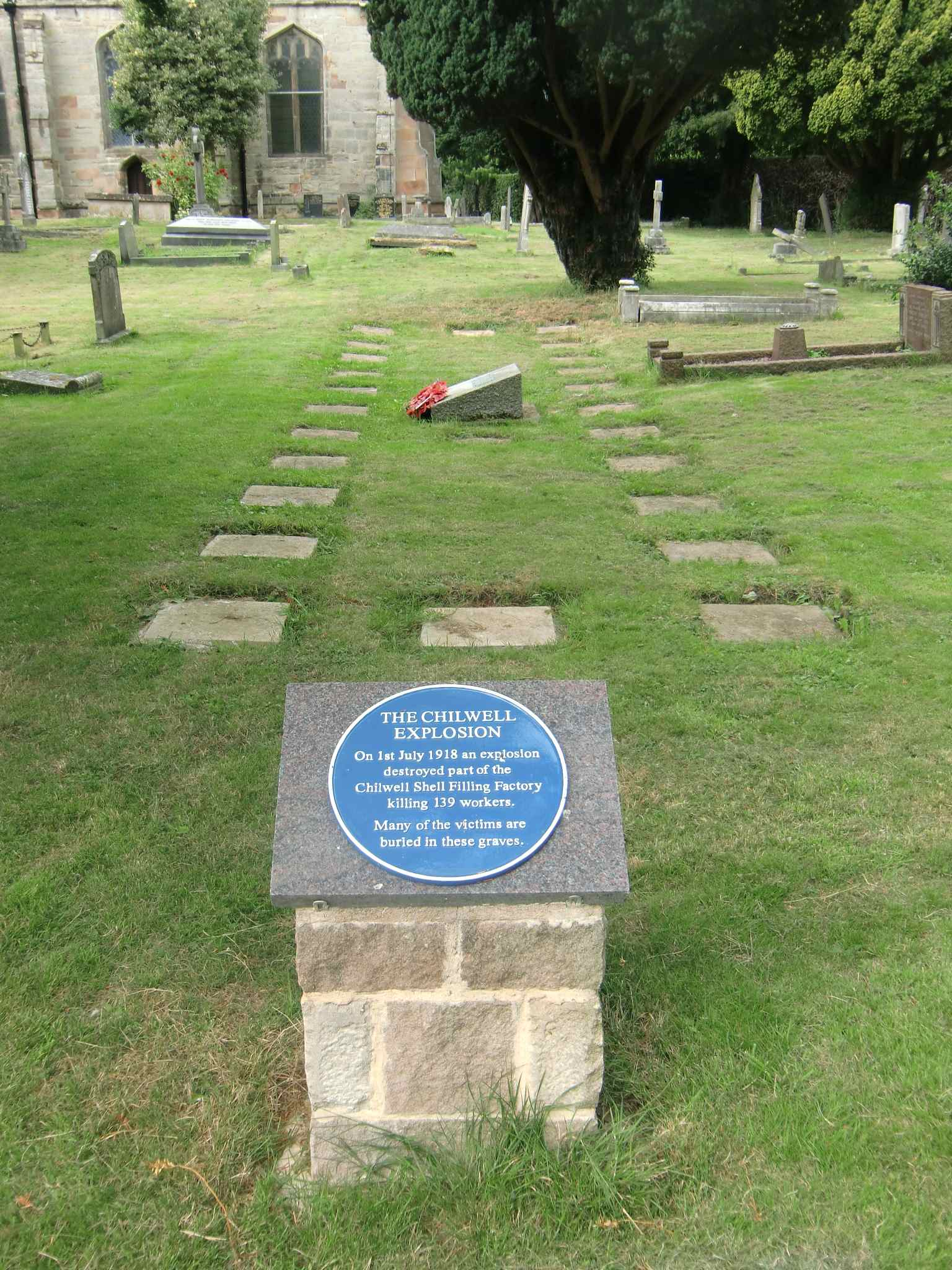
Mass Grave in St. Mary's Church, Attenborough

A substantial part of the National Shell Filling Factory was destroyed in an explosion of eight tons of TNT on 1 July 1918. In all 134 people were killed, of whom only 32 could be positively identified, and a further 250 were injured. The unidentified bodies are in a mass grave in St. Mary's Church, Attenborough. The blast was reportedly heard twenty miles (32 km) away.

The factory returned to work for the war effort the next day, and within one month of the disaster reportedly achieved its highest weekly production. Winston Churchill, then Minister of Munitions, sent a telegram:

"Please accept my sincere sympathy with you all in the misfortune that has overtaken your fine Factory and in the loss of valuable lives, those who have perished have died at their stations on the field of duty and those who have lost their dear ones should fortify themselves with this thought, the courage and spirit shown by all concerned both men and women command our admiration, and the decision to which you have all come to carry on without a break is worthy of the spirit which animates our soldiers in the field. I trust the injured are receiving every care." [sic]

A telegram was also sent from Buckingham Palace, on behalf of the King.

In a speech reported in The Times, on 9 July 1918, Mr F. G. Kellaway, MP, Parliamentary Secretary to the Ministry of Munitions speculated that, as the French had apparently given an honour to the Citadel of Verdun, perhaps the factory should be awarded the Victoria Cross. Whilst this award does not appear to have been made, the site was subsequently known as "The V.C. Factory". The works manager, Lieutenant Arthur Hilary Bristowe, was subsequently awarded the Edward Medal on 21 January 1919 for his heroism following the explosion. (When the Edward Medal was discontinued in 1971, living recipients of the award were invited to return the medal, and were issued with the George Cross in exchange.)

Scotland Yard was called in to investigate. Lord Chetwynd is alleged to have told them he was convinced it was sabotage and to have gone as far as naming the culprit. However, the more likely explanation is lax safety standards as the workforce competed to meet increasingly challenging production targets, coupled with the instability of the TNT compound on an unseasonably warm day.

At the time it was only reported in the wartime newspapers as – "60 feared dead in Midlands factory explosion."

On 16 November 1918 the works band, founded by Lord Chetwynd, himself playing cornet, played in the quadrangle of Buckingham Palace. They then marched to Downing Street and played outside No 10 and were congratulated by David Lloyd George, the prime minister, and they then played a further selection of items outside the Ministry of Munitions.

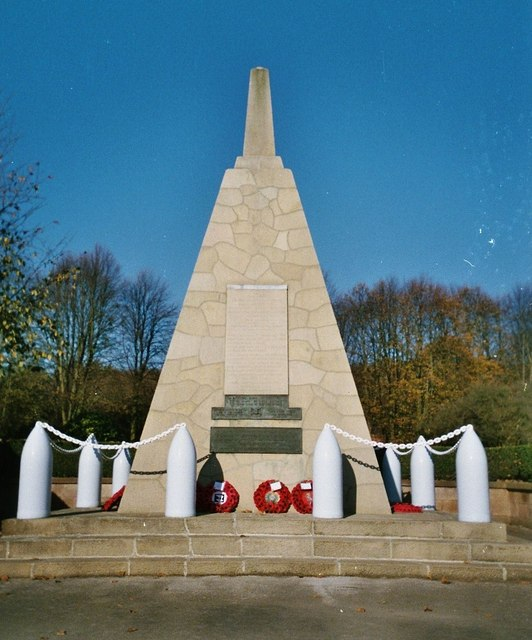
The Grade II listed Chilwell Filling Factory Memorial

A memorial to those who had died in all explosions at the site was unveiled by the Duke of Portland on 13 March 1919. It takes the form of a small obelisk above a massive pyramidal base. There is an inscribed stone, with a curiously statistical approach to commemorating the factory's achievements as well as the dead:

Erected to the memory of those men and women who lost their lives by explosions at the National Shell Filling Factory Chilwell 1916–1918
Principal historical facts of the factory
First sod turned 13 September 1915
First shell filled 8 January 1916
Number of shells filled within one year of cutting the first sod 1,260,000
Total shells filled 19,359,000 representing 50.8% of the total output of high-explosive shell both lyddite and amatol 60pd to 15inch produced in Great Britain during the war
Total tonnage of explosive used 121,360 tons
Total weight of filled shell 1,100,000 tons

On the fiftieth anniversary of the explosion, the memorial was restored and plaques were added with the following text:

To the glory of God and in memory of those who gave their lives in two World Wars
At the going down of the sun and in the morning we will remember them their name liveth for evermore

Unveiled on 30 June 1968 by MT James Boyden MP Parliamentary Undersecretary of State for the Army on the occasion of the 50th anniversary of the explosion at Chilwell the V.C. Factory in recognition of the bravery and fortitude of the employees

At the end of the war, in 1919, the site became a Royal Army Ordnance Corps (RAOC) storage depot. It is now the location of Chetwynd Barracks. The memorial became a listed building in 1988.

On the centenary of the explosion in 2018, the mass grave at Attenborough Church was renovated to a design by members of the Royal Engineers based at Chetwynd Barracks. The new memorial takes the form of a simplified Celtic cross in Corten steel with a superimposed sword in stainless steel. This memorial echoes the original wooden cross on the grave that was lost to vandalism. The grave was rededicated by the Bishop of Southwell and Nottingham on 1 July 2018.

== See also ==
- Munitionette (woman working in a filling factory)
- National Filling Factory, Georgetown (NFF No 4, in Scotland)
- List of the largest artificial non-nuclear explosions
