= Stapleford, Nottinghamshire =

Town and civil parish in Nottinghamshire, England

Coordinates: 52.929°N 1.274°W

Stapleford
- Town and civil parish
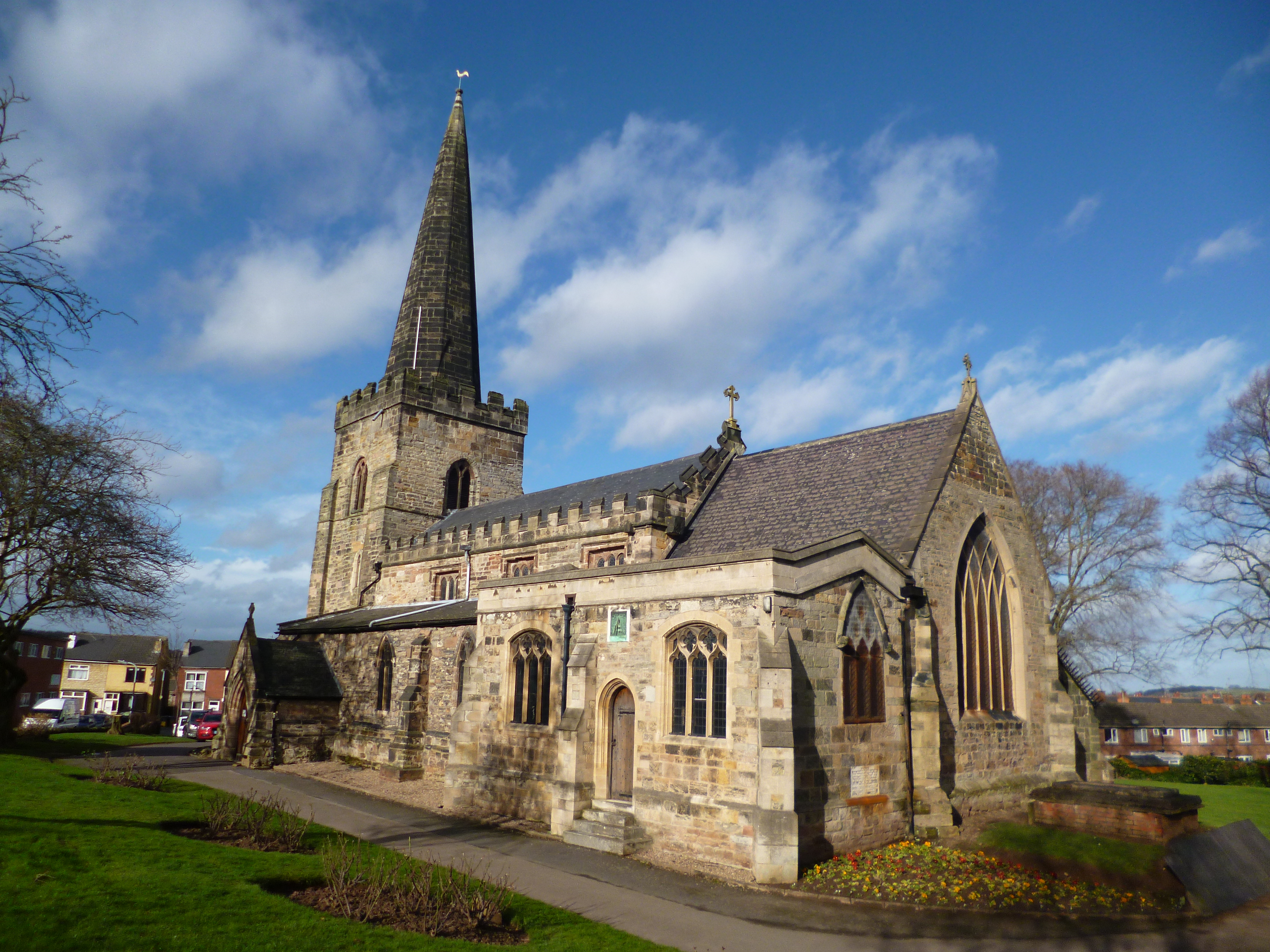
- St Helens Church, Stapleford
- Parish map
- Location within Nottinghamshire
- Area: 1.65 sq mi (4.3 km^{2})
- Population: 15,453 (2021)
  - Density: 9,365/sq mi (3,616/km^{2})
- OS grid reference: SK 48796 37125
  - London: 110 mi (180 km) SSE
- District: Broxtowe
- Shire county: Nottinghamshire
- Region: East Midlands
- Country: England
- Sovereign state: United Kingdom
- Post town: NOTTINGHAM
- Postcode district: NG9
- Dialling code: 0115
- Police: Nottinghamshire
- Fire: Nottinghamshire
- Ambulance: East Midlands
- UK Parliament: Broxtowe
- Website: stapleford-tc.gov.uk

Stapleford (/ˈsteɪpəlfərd/) is a town and civil parish in the Borough of Broxtowe, Nottinghamshire, England, 6 miles (9.7 km) west of Nottingham. The population of the civil parish at the 2001 census was 14,991, at the 2011 census it was 15,241, and 15,453 at the 2021 census.

== Geography ==
Stapleford lies on the border between Nottinghamshire and Derbyshire. To the north of Stapleford is Ilkeston and to the east is Beeston. To the west across the River Erewash is Sandiacre, and in the south is Toton.

== Politics ==
Stapleford is part of Broxtowe borough and the Broxtowe Parliamentary Constituency. From 1935 until 1974 Stapleford was paired with the town of Beeston in the Beeston and Stapleford Urban District, having previously been part of the Stapleford Rural District. The town was parished in 1987 and now has a town council.

The local MP is Juliet Campbell of the Labour Party from July 2024, and the town is represented on Nottinghamshire County Council by John Doddy of Reform UK and on Broxtowe Borough Council by four members of the Broxtowe Alliance and two members of the Broxtowe Independent Group. The town council is a mixture of ten Labour councillors, two representing the Green Party and five Independents since the election in 2023.

== Brief history ==
The place-name is first attested in the Domesday Book of 1086, where it appears, unusually, spelt as now, and in the Pipe Rolls of 1197 . The name means "ford marked by a post or posts".

Stapleford's origins can be traced to before the Norman Conquest. In the churchyard of St Helen's church is the Stone Cross which is Saxon and believed to be the oldest Christian monument in the Midlands. Stapleford owed its development in part to its closeness to the River Trent and the River Erewash as the town became a point of trade. The antiquary John Weever defined a staple town "to be a place, to which by the prince's authority and privilege wool, hides of beasts, wine, corn or grain, and other exotic or foreign merchandize [sic] are transferred, carried or conveyed to be sold." The area also expanded in the late 18th century when the stocking hose trade thrived in the Midlands. Evidence of this history can be found today with the original Stocking Knitters' Houses still standing alongside more modern properties and shops such as on Nottingham Road. The main crossroads in Stapleford at the junction of Nottingham Road, Derby Road, Toton Lane and Church Street is called The Roach. The name is from the time when French prisoners from the Napoleonic Wars were set the task of cutting through rock to create roads and this was referred to as La Roche.

Stapleford is also home to the Hemlock Stone on Stapleford Hill. It is approximately 200 million years old, dating to the Triassic Period.

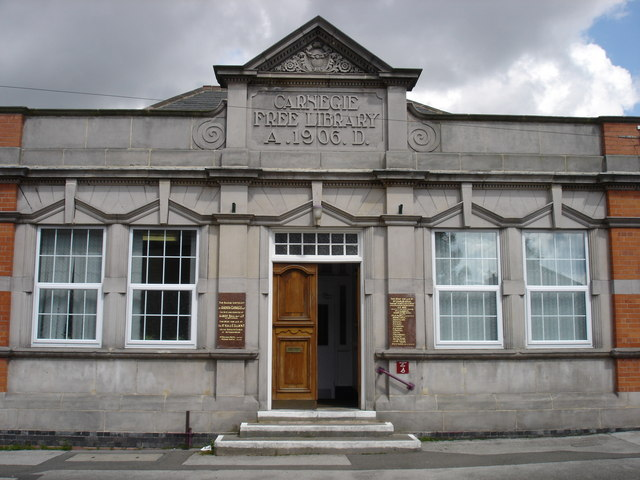
The Community Centre

In 2006, a new NHS Health Centre and Walk-In Centre opened in the town, but has since closed and has been succeeded by a large multi use healthcare centre with a mental health unit and cafe on site. Sainsbury's local was opened on the site of the former Total petrol station in 2007.

Stapleford is the home of the Full Mash microbrewery.

== Nickname ==
The town is often referred to informally as "Stabbo". It is not known when or where this colloquialism originated. The local newspaper, Nottingham Post, conject that 'Stappo' might have been used as a contraction of 'Stapleford', and that this became 'Stabbo' over time.

== Notable people ==
- Tom Johnston, football manager and player.
- Arthur Mee, the writer, journalist and educator, was born in Stapleford in 1875.
- Gallipoli hero Walter Richard Parker, recipient of the Victoria Cross, lived in Stapleford and is buried in the town cemetery.
- Dave Watson, who was a defender in the Sunderland team that won the FA Cup in 1973, was born in Stapleford in 1946.
- Sir John Borlase Warren, an 18th-century MP for Nottingham and an admiral, lived in Stapleford. The now closed Happy Man and Warren Arms pubs were named after him and his family. A large Wetherspoons named after him is located in the town centre.
- John Radford, wine and food writer, author and broadcaster, grew up in Stapleford from 1949 to 1965
- Frederick Attenborough, academic, principal of University College, Leicester.
- Frederick Randon, cricketer
- Sir Robert Salisbury, renowned educationalist, professor and author
- Alan Charlton, British diplomat
- Katie Redford, actor and writer; plays Lili Pargetter in The Archers on BBC Radio 4
- Bonnie Blue, pornographic film actress

== Schools and colleges ==
=== Primary schools ===
- Albany Infant and Nursery School
- Albany Junior School
- Fairfield Primary Academy
- Wadsworth Fields Primary School (formerly Fredrick Harrison's Infant school & Stevenson's Junior School)
- St John's C of E Primary School
- William Lilley Infant and Nursery School

=== Secondary schools ===
- George Spencer Academy

=== Colleges ===
- George Spencer Sixth Form

== Media ==
=== Television ===
Local news and television programmes are BBC East Midlands and ITV Central. Television signals are received from the Waltham TV transmitter, and the Nottingham relay transmitter.

=== Radio ===
The town is served by these local radio stations:

- BBC Radio Nottingham on 103.8 FM
- Smooth East Midlands on 106.6 FM
- Capital East Midlands on 96.2 FM
- Greatest Hits Radio Midlands on 106.6 FM
- BBC Radio Leicester can also be received in the town on 104.9 FM

=== Newspapers ===
The Nottingham Post is the town's local newspaper.

== Transport ==
Road transport is the primary method of transport in and out of the area. East Midlands Airport is approximately 10 miles or 16 kilometres away, the airport provides domestic and international routes, focused mainly on EU/EEA/Swiss routes.

=== Bus ===
Bus services operate to Nottingham, Derby, Beeston, Ilkeston and other local towns.

==== Trentbarton ====
- i4: Nottingham – QMC – Stapleford – Sandiacre – Risley – Derby.
- my15: Old Sawley – Stapleford – Ilkeston.

==== NottsBus ====
- 510: Beeston – Attenborough – Toton – Stapleford. (Subsidised by Nottinghamshire County Council)
- 511: Stapleford Shopper. (Subsidised by Nottinghamshire County Council)

==== CT4N ====
In October 2018, CT4N took over the running of the trentbarton service '18'.

- eighteen: Nottingham - QMC - University Boulevard - Boots - Beeston - Stapleford

=== Roads ===
Stapleford is connected to Nottingham, Derby and the M1 motorway by the A52.

=== Railway ===
The closest railway station (with regular services) is Beeston providing direct services to Nottingham, Derby, London, Lincoln, Bedford, Burton upon Trent, Leicester, Loughborough, Tamworth, Newark (Castle), Luton, East Midlands Parkway, Birmingham and Matlock.

=== Light rail ===
In August 2015, a Light Rail (tram) line was opened towards Stapleford via Beeston and Chilwell as part of the Nottingham Express Transit system. A park and ride station, called Toton Lane Park & Ride, has been built about one mile south of Stapleford town centre, and adjacent to some residential areas of the town. It is on Toton Lane, just south of the A52 roundabout, and is the terminus of line 1 of the Phase 2 expansion. There are no current plans for extension into the centre of Stapleford.

== Conservation ==
The parish contains 17 listed buildings that are recorded in the National Heritage List for England. Of these, one is listed at Grade I, the highest of the three grades, one is at Grade II*, the middle grade, and the others are at Grade II, the lowest grade.
