= Godfrey Chetwynd, 8th Viscount Chetwynd =

English peer and munitions manufacturer

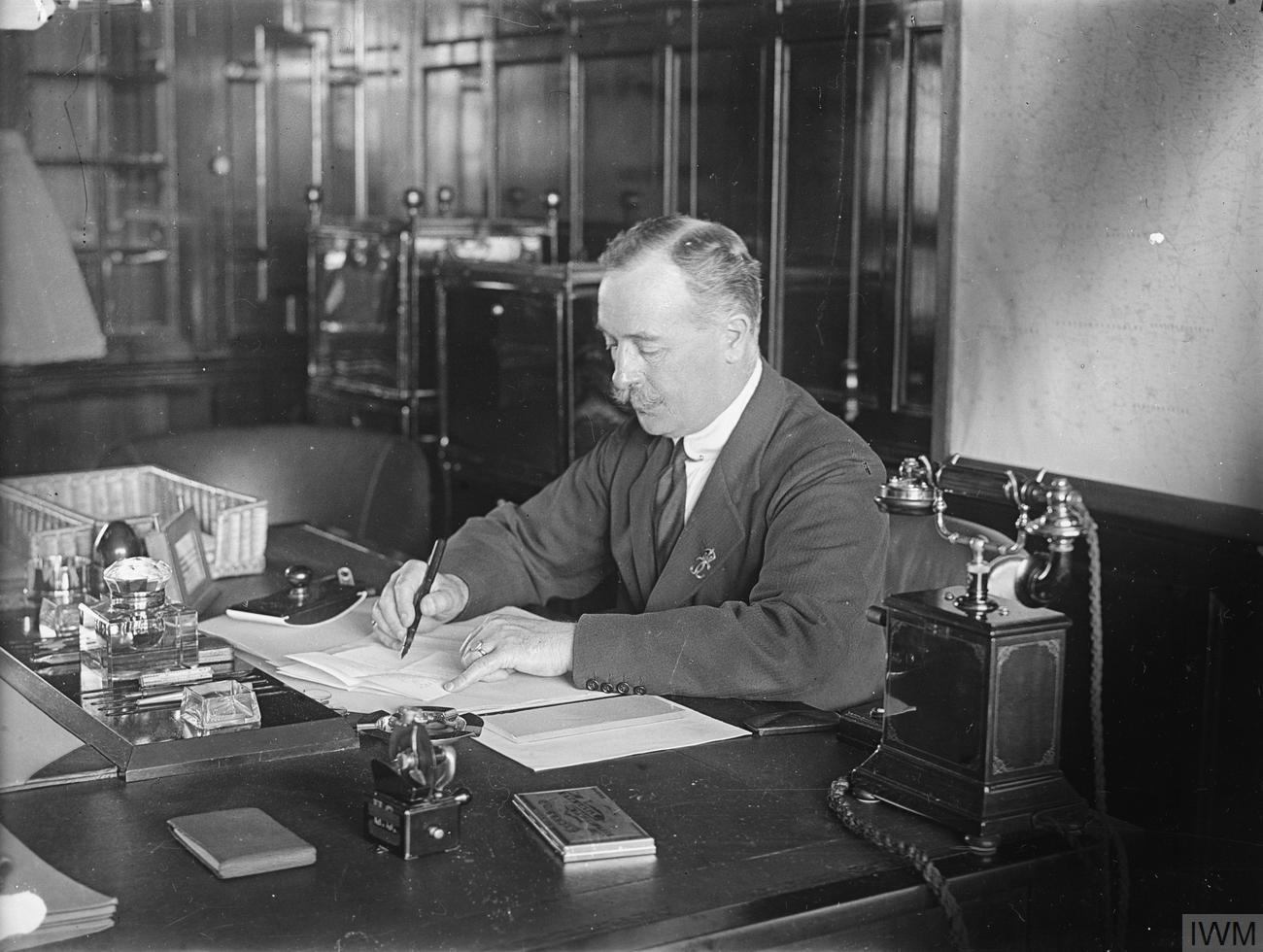
Chetwynd, 1917

Godfrey John Boyle Chetwynd, 8th Viscount Chetwynd, CH (3 October 1863 – 22 March 1936) was a British peer and industrialist, a member of the House of Lords from 1911 until his death.

Chetwynd was the second son of Captain Henry Weyland Chetwynd (1829–1893; the third son of the 6th Viscount Chetwynd) and his wife Julia Bosville Davidson (d. 1901; a maternal granddaughter of the 3rd Baron Macdonald of Sleat). On 12 April 1893, he married Baroness Hilda von Alvensleben-Rusteberg. They later divorced and on 10 February 1904, he married secondly the Hon. Mary Eden, third daughter of the 4th Baron Auckland, and they had three children, Adam Duncan (1904–1965), John Julian (1906–1966), and (Mary Diana) Eve (1908–1997).

In 1911, Chetwynd inherited his uncle's titles. Between 1915 and 1919, he was managing director of the National Shell Filling Factory No. 6, Chilwell, Nottinghamshire, which he designed and built; for which he was a made a Member of the Order of the Companions of Honour for his services to the war effort.

Coat of arms of Godfrey Chetwynd, 8th Viscount Chetwynd
Crest A goat's head erased Argent attired Or. Escutcheon Azure a chevron between three mullets Or. Supporters Two unicorns Argent each gorged with a chaplet of roses Gules barbed and seeded Proper thereto affixed reflexed over the back a line of roses as around the neck. Motto Probitas Verus Honos

Peerage of Ireland
Preceded by Richard Chetwynd	Viscount Chetwynd; 1911–1936	Succeeded by Adam Chetwynd
