= Chilwell =

Village in Broxtowe, Nottinghamshire, England

Coordinates: 52.916°N 1.235°W

- Suburb
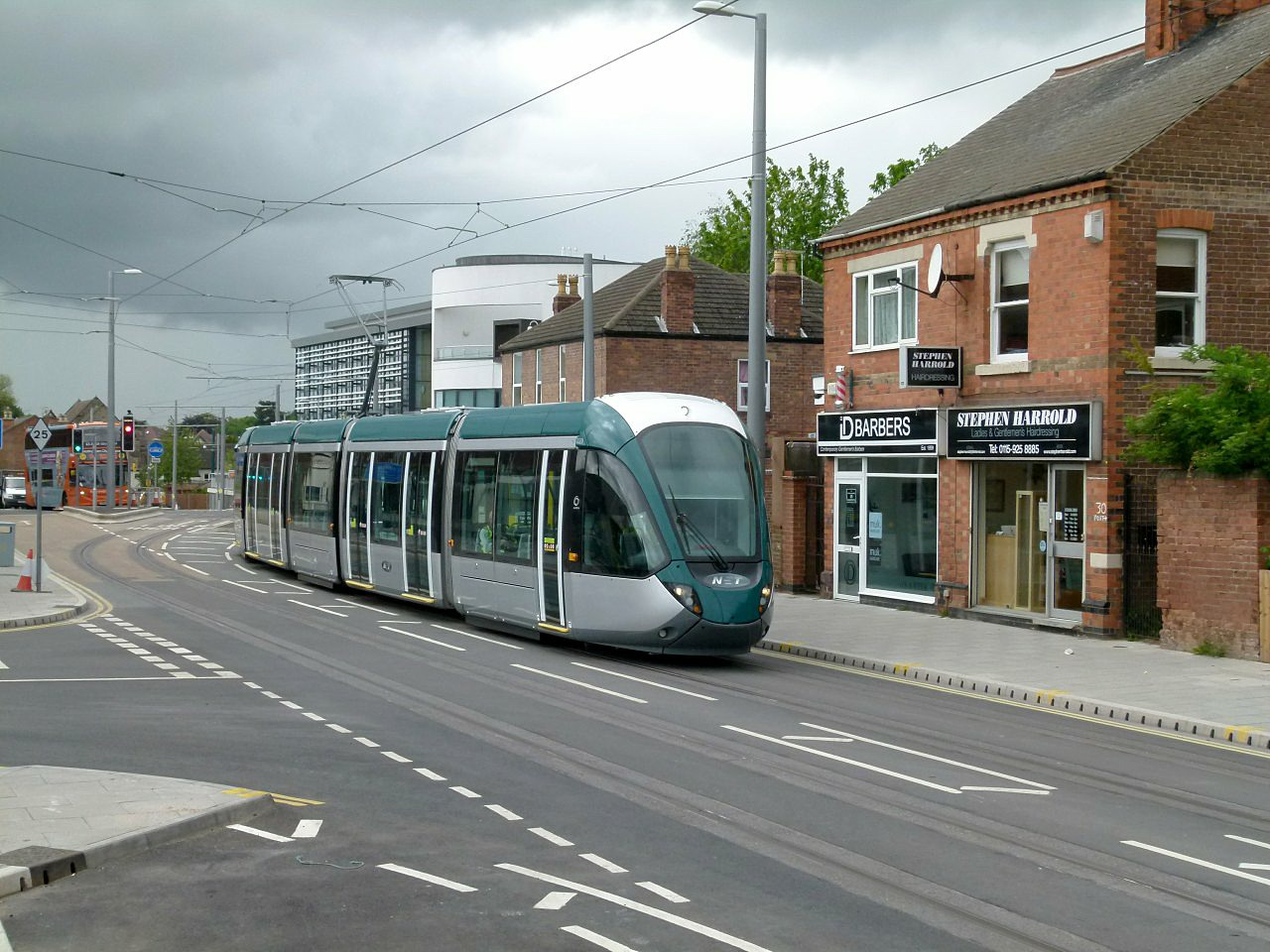
- High Road

- Location within Nottinghamshire
- Population: 12,864 (2xChilwell Wards. 2011)
- OS grid reference: SK 51433 35706
- District: Borough of Broxtowe
- Shire county: Nottinghamshire
- Region: East Midlands
- Country: England
- Sovereign state: United Kingdom
- Post town: Nottingham
- Postcode district: NG9
- Dialling code: 0115
- Police: Nottinghamshire
- Fire: Nottinghamshire
- Ambulance: East Midlands
- UK Parliament: Broxtowe

Chilwell is a suburban area in the borough of Broxtowe in Nottinghamshire, England. It lies on the west side of the town of Beeston and is 4 miles (6.4 km) south-west of the centre of Nottingham.

== History ==
Roman buildings, pottery and coins have been found in Chilwell. Chilwell was originally a hamlet on the road from Nottingham to Ashby-de-la-Zouch. It is mentioned in the Domesday Book of 1086, but along with Toton it became part of the parish of Attenborough. Suburban development spread gradually from Beeston along Chilwell High Road.

The area's population grew substantially during the First World War, when most of the area of level ground between Chilwell and Toton was occupied by the National Shell Filling Factory No. 6 and the original direct route between Chilwell and Toton became a gated military road, now known as Chetwynd Road.

On 1 July 1918, 134 people were killed and over 250 people were injured in an explosion at the factory. This tragedy remains the largest number of deaths caused by an explosion in Britain. The memorial to the dead can be found in nearby church yard of St Mary's, Attenborough. The army continued to dominate the area with the factory becoming a major depot site for the Royal Army Ordnance Corps, and more recently for the Royal Engineers. The Chilwell Bypass Road was constructed in the 1930s to take army traffic out of the village centre.

Chilwell had a number of pubs in its centre on Chilwell High Road. The Original Chequers Inn is on the border with Beeston and is a turn of the century pub that was once a coaching house. The Charlton Arms is named after a local landowning family who formerly lived in the demolished Chilwell Hall. The Cadland is named after a locally trained racehorse that won The Derby in 1828.

Chilwell has had a long-standing non-conformist population. The Chilwell Methodist Church was founded in 1798 as the Methodist First Connection Chapel at Hallams Lane. Its Sunday School (provided jointly with local Baptists) provided the first free education for the poor of the area. The chapel moved to land provided by Squire Charlton in 1857. Christ Church, Chilwell was built in 1903 to provide an Anglican church to serve the growing population, although it did not become a separate ecclesiastical parish from Attenborough until 1975.

=== Since 1900 ===
The Inham Nook estate (including the Inham Nook pub) was built by Beeston and Stapleford Urban District Council on land to the west of Bramcote Lane from the 1950s; St Barnabas's Church was constructed in 1957 as a "mission church" to serve the new population. For many years, Inham Nook's council housing was in sharp contrast to the surrounding areas of middle class suburban owner-occupation. Since the 1980s right to buy legislation, tenure has been more mixed, but Inham Nook remains relatively deprived compared to other areas in the southern part of Broxtowe borough. The council, in partnership with NET, have recently spent £100,000 on refurbishment works to the Inham Nook sports pavilion to help improve local facilities for the community. The works included updating the changing facilities for local football teams, and improving the bowls facilities and accessibility to the pavilion. The works were carried out by local contractor GPS Construction (Nottingham). Chilwell Manor Golf Club was established in 1906 on land formerly belonging to the Manor. The Manor House and nearby Chilwell Green remained intact until 1965 when the bland Clarkes Lane development of large detached houses started construction.

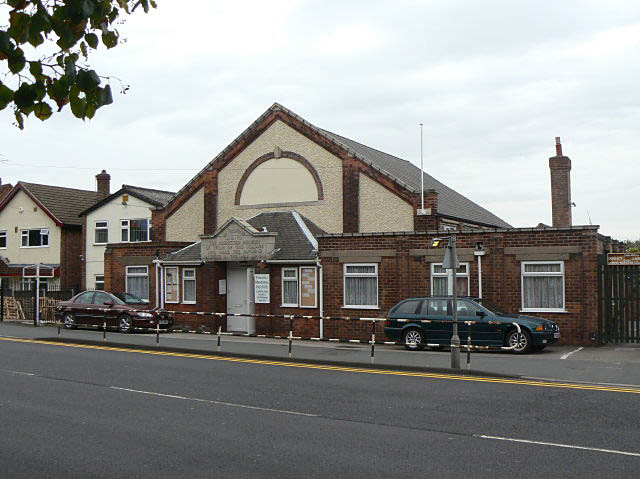
Chilwell Memorial Institute

Chilwell War Memorial Hall and Institute was opened on 3 May 1924. It was built to commemorate the memory of the gallant men of the village who sacrificed their lives during the Great War. The Hall and Institute was established to be a place for assembly and recreation for the community and surrounding neighbourhoods, and still offers many activities to meet this aim.

Chilwell School is located off Queens Road West adjacent to the golf course. It shares a site and facilities with the Chilwell Olympia Sports Centre. Prior to construction of the school in the 1970s, this area was Kirk's Farm. It had remained undeveloped as the land has a high water table and poor drainage. A hectare of the school grounds was not drained for playing fields and is now the Chilwell Meadow nature reserve managed by the Nottinghamshire Wildlife Trust as a rare example of a "wet meadow" of unimproved grassland.

Parts of the golf course are also sites of importance for nature conservation; there has been some work in recent years to remove non-native species in the golf course planting, to improve native biodiversity.

== Demography ==
Chilwell population is 14,024 with the average household at 2.30 with the population density per hectare at 44.30. In 1931, the Chilwell civil parish had a population of 2,584. At the 2011 Census, the two Chilwell wards (East and West) had a total population of 12,864.

There are 90.2% White British and 9.8% with people from 35 different countries including India, Pakistan, France, Germany, Poland, Jamaica, China, Ecuador, Australia, Ireland and the United States.

== Transport ==
=== Railway ===
Attenborough railway station is the nearest National Rail station, which hosts the following hourly services during weekdays:

- Matlock - Nottingham, via Derby
- Leicester - Lincoln or Grimsby.

=== Tram ===
Line 1 of the Nottingham Express Transit tram line runs between Toton Lane and Hucknall, via Nottingham city centre.

There are local stops at the following locations:

- High Road – Central College
- Cator Lane
- Bramcote Lane
- Eskdale Drive
- Inham Road

=== Buses ===
Chilwell is served by routes operated by three bus companies.

Nottingham City Transport:

- 36: Nottingham – Derby Road – QMC – Beeston – Chilwell

Trent Barton:

- Indigo: Nottingham – Beeston – Chilwell – Long Eaton – Derby
- 18: Nottingham – QMC – Beeston – Chilwell – Stapleford

Nottsbus Connect (Nottinghamshire County Council):

- 510: Beeston – Chilwell – Attenborough – Toton – Stapleford

== Former civil parish ==
Chilwell is a former civil parish. On 1 April 1935 the parish was abolished, with most of its area being included in the new parish and urban district of Beeston and Stapleford, and a smaller area going to Clifton with Glapton. Beeston and Stapleford Urban District was abolished in 1974 to become part of the new borough of Broxtowe. No successor parish was created for the former urban district and Chilwell is therefore directly administered by Broxtowe Borough Council.

== See also ==
- Listed buildings in Attenborough and Chilwell
