= Stan Heptinstall =

English academic & local politician (born 1946)

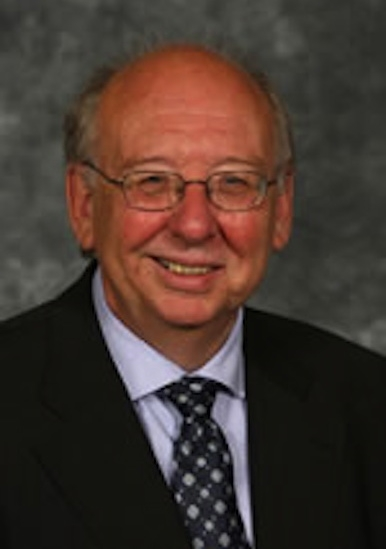

Emeritus Professor of the University of Nottingham
- Incumbent
- Assumed office 2011

Mayor of Broxtowe
- In office May 2014 – May 2015
- Deputy: Susan Bagshaw
- Preceded by: Iris White
- Succeeded by: Susan Bagshaw

Councillor for Nottinghamshire County Council
- In office 1997–2017
- Ward: Bramcote and Stapleford
- Succeeded by: Steve Carr

Personal details
- Born: 21 August 1946 (age 79)
- Party: Liberal Democrats
- Spouse: Reverend Canon Lillian Heptinstall
- Children: Victoria, Robert, Amanda and William James
- Occupation: Academic and politics

Stanley Heptinstall MBE (born 21 August 1946) is an Emeritus Professor of the University of Nottingham, former director of Platelet Solutions Ltd (a spinout company of the University of Nottingham), and former local government councillor on Broxtowe Borough Council and Nottinghamshire County Council.

Previously he was professor of Thrombosis and Haemostasis at the University of Nottingham, retiring in 2011. Professor Heptinstall served as Head of the Division of Cardiovascular Medicine in the School of Clinical Sciences, Faculty of Medicine and Health Sciences.

He has been a local government councillor for 25 years, serving on Broxtowe Borough Council and Nottinghamshire County Council. He retired as a borough councillor in 2015, having served as the mayor of the Borough of Broxtowe in the year 2014/15. He retired as a county councillor in the year 2016/17.

== Early life ==
Stan Heptinstall was born in Bolton, Lancashire, son of Stanley Heptinstall and Florence Heptinstall (née Hampson). He has a sister Brenda, born in 1950. The family moved to St Annes-on-Sea when he was 8 years old.

== Education ==
His primary education (aged 8–11 years) was mainly in St Annes-on-Sea. His secondary education was at Ansdell Secondary Modern School (11–13 years) followed by King Edward VII School, Lytham St Annes (13–17 years). Heptinstall pursued undergraduate studies at the University of Newcastle upon Tyne between 1964 and 1967 and graduated with a first class degree in chemistry. He then successfully obtained a Science Research Council studentship to study for a PhD in the Microbiological Chemistry Research Laboratory at the University of Newcastle upon Tyne working with Professor Ron Archibald, who was his supervisor, and Sir Jim Baddiley, who was the head of the laboratory and of the Department of Chemistry. Following this period of research, he obtained an Imperial Chemical Industries Postdoctoral Research Fellowship to continue his studies on the structure and function of teichoic acids in bacterial cell walls. It was during this time that he published his first scientific papers.

== Professional career ==
In 1971, Heptinstall sought a change in his academic direction and secured a two-year postdoctoral fellowship to study blood platelets in the newly established Faculty of Medicine in the University of Nottingham. He focused his research on the role of platelets in thrombosis and haemostasis under the mentorship of Professor Tony Mitchell, DPhil, FRCP, who was the foundation professor of Medicine at the University of Nottingham. Over subsequent years he was awarded a non-clinical lectureship, progressed to Senior Lecturer and then became a Reader in Thrombosis and Haemostasis. He was awarded a personal chair in 1985, and gained the title of professor of Thrombosis and Haemostasis.

For many years Professor Heptinstall was the main coordinator of the Clinical Sciences Homebase which contributes to the delivery of teaching for medical students studying for the Bachelor of Medical Sciences at the University of Nottingham, while continuing with his own research as the Head of the Thrombosis and Haemostasis research group in the Division of Cardiovascular Medicine. Following the retirement of Professor Bob Wilcox, FRCP in 2009, Professor Heptinstall was appointed Head of the Department of Cardiovascular Medicine in the School of Clinical Sciences at the University of Nottingham Medical School. He was instrumental in mentoring undergraduate and postgraduate students, postdoctoral scientists, and clinicians from the affiliated Nottingham University Hospitals NHS Trust who undertook periods of research in the Faculty of Medicine and Health Sciences.

For 25 years he served as the Editor-in-Chief of the scientific journal Platelets (1990–2014). In March 2015 the new editors produced a special issue of the journal in honour of his contribution to the journal and also to highlight his scientific achievements. For many years he also served on the editorial boards of a number of scientific journals including the Journal of Thrombosis and Haemostasis.

Heptinstall was an active member of the International Society on Thrombosis and Haemostasis and is a past secretary and president the British Society for Haemostasis and Thrombosis. He was a founder member of the European Platelet Group which included working with and encouraging scientists in Europe, and especially through the organisation of conferences on platelets, many of which were held in Erfurt in the former German Democratic Republic.

== Research ==
Professor Heptinstall was head of the Thrombosis and Haemostasis Research Group based in the Queen's Medical Centre, Nottingham for many years, where he engaged in extensive basic and clinical research aimed at understanding the function of platelets and other blood cells in physiological and pathological disease processes. The group has collaborated vastly with the pharmaceutical industry to identify and assess emerging pharmacological agents, as well as conducting clinical trials and studying existing drugs on their actions as antithrombotic agents in patients. A major part of Professor Heptinstall's research was concerned with finding ways through which platelet function can be modified to avoid thrombotic events like myocardial infarction and stroke. Over his career, Professor Heptinstall has published over 200 scientific papers in peer-reviewed journals in the fields of platelet research, thrombosis and haemostasis.

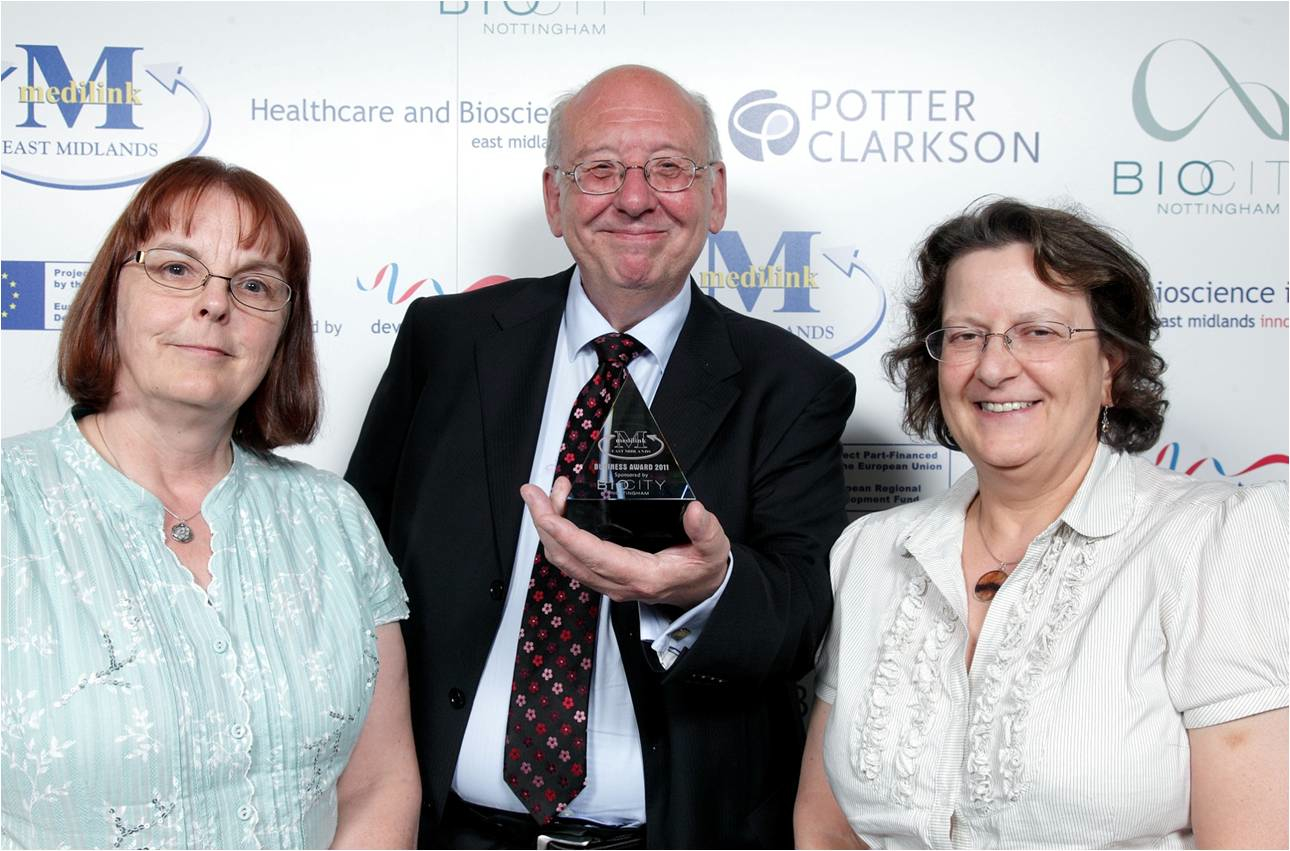
Professor Stan Heptinstall just after receiving an award for Platelet Solutions at Medilink East Midlands Innovation Awards with his team, Dr Sue Fox (left) and Jane May (right)

== Platelet function testing ==
The Thrombosis and Haemostasis Group at the University of Nottingham, under Professor Heptinstall's direction, have identified a variety of test systems for evaluating the function of platelets and other blood cells before and during drug administration. This has led to the development of simple-to-use platelet function testing methods that can be used in any clinical setting, as a means of monitoring the success of drug therapy in patients. For several years Professor Heptinstall was the director of Platelet Solutions Ltd, a spin-out company that provided platelet function testing. On his retirement this company was dissolved and a new company, Platelet Services Ltd, replaced it, directed by Dr Natalia Dovlatova, one of Heptinstall's former PhD students.

== Political career ==
Heptinstall pursued another career in local government. He was first elected to represent Bramcote Ward on Broxtowe Borough Council in 1991, and continued to represent his local community until he retired as a borough councillor in May 2015. He is a Liberal Democrat and served as the Cabinet Member for the Environment at Broxtowe Borough Council until he became the Deputy Mayor. He served his final year as a borough councillor as the Mayor of the Borough of Broxtowe (2014/15). As well as being a borough councillor, Professor Heptinstall was a county councillor and represents Bramcote and Stapleford Division on Nottinghamshire County Council. He was first elected to Nottinghamshire County Council in 1997 and retired in 2017. For many years he was also a member of Stapleford Town Council. He stood as the Liberal Democrat candidate for Derbyshire Police and Crime Commissioner in the 2021 election, but was not elected.

== Community activities ==
Heptinstall is often referred to as a “Community Champion”. He started working with his community in Bramcote back in the late 1970s when he became a member of the Bramcote Hills Community Association. With others, as a member of the organisation and later as it’s chair, he was involved in organising many social events and activities. The Bramcote Care Group was a long-lasting product of these efforts and still provides care in the local community under the auspices of St Michael's Church.

In 1997, Heptinstall was made a Member of the Order of the British Empire (MBE) by Queen Elizabeth II in recognition of his extensive community activities. The citation was: “for services to the people of Bramcote in the county of Nottinghamshire”.

Heptinstall was the founding chair of the group that organises a major community event known as the Hemlock Happening, which annually attracts thousands of people to Bramcote Hills Park for a day of festivities and leisure. For many years he was the chair of the Bramcote Community Action Team. He is a former governor and now a member of The White Hills Park Trust, which provides primary, secondary and special education. He was a trustee of several local charities including Fundays and Beeston Shopmobility but has now retired from these roles. For 10 years he became involved with SW Notts Scouts serving for 9 years as the Chair of Trustees. He retired from this role in December 2025 and on his retirement he, together with many, many very deserving much younger people, received an award for his services to scouting at the Annual Awards Ceremony held that same month.

In his retirement Heptinstall remains a churchwarden at his local parish church, St Michael's Church, a post he has held for a number of years. He also chairs the Resources Committee which works hard to keep the church infrastructure in good order. He is a member of the parochial church council and also sings in the church choir. He also produces a weekly newsletter that keeps everyone informed of all that is happening at St Michael's Church.

== Family life ==
Heptinstall has lived in an area of Bramcote known as Bramcote Hills since 1975. His wife, the Reverend Canon Lillian Heptinstall is an ordained priest in the Church of England. They have four children and by 2026 they have ten grandchildren and two great-grandchildren.
