= Lakeview College =

Educational institution in England

Coordinates: 52°54′44″N 1°13′53″W

Lakeview College was a sixth-form located in Chilwell, Nottingham. It was located on the same campus as Chilwell School and Chilwell Olympia. It had approximately 250 students, mainly studying for AS and A2 level exams, though other courses were taken. Once used as part of Chilwell School, it was opened as a sixth-form college in 1984. It was initially fed by students from Chilwell School, Alderman White and George Spencer, although there were many students from the neighbouring areas of Bramcote and Stapleford.

As part of Chilwell School's 2006 Ofsted inspection, the college was rated as "good".

In September 2006, Chilwell School governors decided that Lakeview College would be entirely managed and taught by Chilwell School staff from September 2008. Alderman White was also due to pull out by this date due to the school entering The White Hills Park Federation Trust, which would have its own sixth-form centre. George Spencer had established its own sixth-form centre in 2004.
