= List of schools in Nottinghamshire =

This is a list of schools in Nottinghamshire, England.

== State-funded schools ==
=== Primary schools ===
- Abbey Gates Primary School, Ravenshead
- Abbey Hill Primary School, Kirkby-in-Ashfield
- Abbey Primary School, Forest Town
- Abbey Road Primary School, West Bridgford
- Albany Infant School, Stapleford
- Albany Junior School, Stapleford
- Alderman Pounder Infant School, Beeston
- All Hallows CE Primary School, Gedling
- All Saints CE/Methodist Primary School, Elston
- Annesley Primary School, Annesley Woodhouse
- Archbishop Cranmer CE Primary Academy, Aslockton
- Arnbrook Primary School, Arnold
- Arno Vale Junior School, Woodthorpe
- Arnold Mill Primary School, Arnold
- Arnold View Primary School, Arnold
- Asquith Primary School, Mansfield
- Awsworth Primary School, Awsworth
- Bagthorpe Primary School, Bagthorpe
- Barnby Road Academy, Newark-on-Trent
- Beardall Fields Primary School, Hucknall
- Beckingham Primary School, Beckingham
- Beeston Fields Primary School, Beeston
- Beeston Rylands Junior School, Beeston
- Berry Hill Primary School, Mansfield
- Bilsthorpe Flying High Academy, Bilsthorpe
- Bingham Primary School, Bingham
- Birklands Primary School, Warsop
- Bishop Alexander LEAD Academy, Newark-on-Trent
- Bispham Spencer Academy, Toton
- Bleasby CE Primary School, Bleasby
- Blidworth Oaks Primary School, Blidworth
- The Bramble Academy, Mansfield Woodhouse
- Bracken Lane Academy, Retford
- Bramcote CE Primary School, Bramcote
- Bramcote Hills Primary School, Bramcote Hills
- Brierley Forest Primary School, Sutton-in-Ashfield
- Brinsley Primary School, Brinsley
- Brookside Primary School, East Leake
- Broomhill Junior School, Hucknall
- Bunny CE Primary School, Bunny
- Burntstump Seely CE Primary Academy, Arnold
- Burton Joyce Primary School, Burton Joyce
- Butler's Hill Infant School, Hucknall
- The Carlton Infant Academy, Carlton
- The Carlton Junior Academy, Carlton
- Carnarvon Primary School, Bingham
- Carr Hill Primary School, Retford
- Caunton Dean Hole CE Primary School, Caunton
- Chetwynd Primary Academy, Toton
- Christ Church CE Primary School, Newark-on-Trent
- Church Vale Primary School, Church Warsop
- Chuter Ede Primary School, Balderton
- Clarborough Primary School, Clarborough
- Coddington CE Primary School, Coddington
- Coppice Farm Primary School, Arnold
- Costock CE Primary School, Costock
- Cotgrave Candleby Lane School, Cotgrave
- Cotgrave CE Primary School, Cotgrave
- Crescent Primary School, Mansfield
- Croft Primary School, Sutton-in-Ashfield
- Cropwell Bishop Primary School, Cropwell Bishop
- Crossdale Primary School, Keyworth
- Cuckney CE Primary School, Cuckney
- Dalestorth Primary School, Sutton-in-Ashfield
- Dunham-on-Trent CE Primary School, Dunham-on-Trent
- East Bridgford St Peters CE Academy, East Bridgford
- East Markham Primary School, East Markham
- Eastlands Junior School, Meden Vale
- Edwalton Primary School, Edwalton
- Elkesley Primary School, Elkesley
- Ernehale Infant School, Arnold
- Ernehale Junior School, Arnold
- Eskdale Junior School, Chilwell
- Everton Primary School, Everton
- Fairfield Primary Academy, Stapleford
- Farmilo Primary School, Mansfield
- Farnsfield St Michael's CE Primary School, Farnsfield
- Flintham Primary School, Flintham
- The Florence Nightingale Academy, Eastwood
- The Flying High Academy, Mansfield
- Forest Glade Primary School, Sutton-in-Ashfield
- Forest Town Primary School, Forest Town
- The Forest View Academy, New Ollerton
- Gamston St Peter's CE Primary School, Gamston
- Gateford Park Primary School, Gateford Park
- Gilthill Primary School, Kimberley
- The Good Shepherd RC Primary School, Woodthorpe
- Gotham Primary School, Gotham
- Greasley Beauvale Primary School, Newthorpe
- Greenwood Primary School, Kirkby-in-Ashfield
- Greythorn Primary School, West Bridgford
- Gunthorpe CE Primary School, Gunthorpe
- Haddon Primary School, Carlton
- Haggonfields Primary School, Rhodesia
- Halam CE Primary School, Halam
- Hallcroft Infant School, Retford
- Harworth CE Academy, Harworth
- Hawthorne Primary School, Bestwood Village
- Healdswood Infants' School, Skegby
- Heatherley Primary School, Forest Town
- Heathlands Primary School, Rainworth
- Hetts Lane Infant School, Warsop
- Heymann Primary School, Wilford Hill
- High Oakham Primary School, Mansfield
- Hillocks Primary Academy, Sutton-in-Ashfield
- Hillside Primary School, Hucknall
- Holgate Primary School, Hucknall
- Holly Hill Primary School, Selston
- Holly Primary School, Forest Town
- Hollywell Primary School, Kimberley
- Holy Cross RC Primary Academy, Hucknall
- Holy Family RC Primary School, Worksop
- Holy Trinity CE Infant School, Southwell
- Holy Trinity RC Academy, Newark
- Horsendale Primary School, Nuthall
- Hucknall Flying High Academy, Hucknall
- Hucknall National CE Primary School, Hucknall
- Huthwaite All Saint's CE Infant School, Huthwaite
- Intake Farm Primary School, Mansfield
- Jacksdale Primary School, Jacksdale
- James Peacock Infant School, Ruddington
- Jesse Gray Primary School, West Bridgford
- John Blow Primary School, Collingham
- John Clifford Primary School, Beeston
- John Hunt Academy, New Balderton
- John T Rice Infant School, Forest Town
- Keyworth Primary School, Keyworth
- Killisick Junior School, Arnold
- Kimberley Primary School, Kimberley
- King Edward Primary School, Mansfield
- King Edwin Primary School, Edwinstowe
- The King's CE Primary Academy, Newark-on-Trent
- Kingston Park Academy, Carlton in Lindrick
- Kingsway Primary School, Kirkby-in-Ashfield
- Kinoulton Primary School, Kinoulton
- Kirkby Woodhouse School, Kirkby-in-Ashfield
- Kirklington Primary School, Kirklington
- Kneesall CE Primary School, Kneesall
- Lady Bay Primary School, West Bridgford
- Lake View Primary School, Rainworth
- Lambley Primary School, Lambley
- The Lanes Primary School, Beeston
- Langar CE Primary School, Langar
- Langold Dyscarr Community School, Langold
- Lantern Lane Primary School, East Leake
- Larkfields Infant School, Nuthall
- Larkfields Junior School, Nuthall
- Lawrence View Primary School, Eastwood
- Leamington Primary Academy, Sutton-in-Ashfield
- Leas Park Junior School, Mansfield Woodhouse
- Leen Mills Primary School, Hucknall
- Leverton CE Academy, North Leverton
- Linby-cum-Papplewick CE Primary School, Linby
- Lovers Lane Primary School, Newark-on-Trent
- Lowdham CE Primary School, Lowdham
- Lowe's Wong CE Methodist Junior School, Southwell
- Lowe's Wong Infant School, Southwell
- Manor Park Infant School, Calverton
- Mansfield Primary Academy, Mansfield
- Mapperley Plains Primary School, Mapperley
- Mapplewells Primary School, Sutton-in-Ashfield
- Mattersey Primary School, Mattersey
- Maun Infant School, New Ollerton
- Millside Spencer Academy, East Leake
- The Minster School, Southwell
- Misson Primary School, Misson
- Misterton Primary School, Misterton
- Mornington Primary School, Nuthall
- Morven Park Primary School, Kirkby-in-Ashfield
- Mount CE Primary School, Newark-on-Trent
- Muskham Primary School, North Muskham
- Netherfield Infant School, Meden Vale
- Netherfield Primary School, Netherfield
- Nettleworth Infant School, Mansfield Woodhouse
- Newlands Junior School, Forest Town
- Newstead Primary School, Newstead
- Norbridge Academy, Worksop
- Normanton-on-Soar Primary School, Normanton on Soar
- North Clifton Primary School, North Clifton
- North Wheatley CE Primary School, South Wheatley
- Northfield Primary School, Mansfield Woodhouse
- Norwell CE Primary School, Norwell
- Oak Tree Primary School, Mansfield
- Orchard Primary School, Kirkby-in-Ashfield
- Ordsall Primary School, Retford
- Orston Primary School, Orston
- Parkdale Primary School, Carlton
- The Parkgate Academy, New Ollerton
- Peafield Lane Academy, Mansfield Woodhouse
- Phoenix Infant School, Gedling
- Pierrepont Gamston Primary School, West Bridgford
- Pinewood Infant School, Arnold
- Porchester Junior School, Carlton
- Priestsic Primary School, Sutton-in-Ashfield
- The Primary School of St Mary and St Martin, Blyth
- Priory Junior School, Gedling
- The Priory RC Academy, Eastwood
- Prospect Hill Infant School, Worksop
- Prospect Hill Junior School, Worksop
- The Python Hill Academy, Rainworth
- Queen Eleanor Primary School, Harby
- Radcliffe-on-Trent Infant School, Radcliffe-on-Trent
- Radcliffe-on-Trent Junior School, Radcliffe-on-Trent
- Rampton Primary School, Rampton
- Ramsden Primary School, Carlton in Lindrick
- Ranby CE Primary School, Ranby
- Ravenshead CE Primary School, Ravenshead
- Redlands Primary School, Worksop
- Richard Bonington Primary School, Arnold
- Rivendell Flying High Academy, Stoke Bardolph
- Robert Mellors Primary Academy, Arnold
- Robert Miles Infant School, Bingham
- Robert Miles Junior School, Bingham
- Rosecliffe Spencer Academy, Edwalton
- Round Hill Primary School, Beeston
- The Sacred Heart RC Primary Academy, Carlton
- St Andrew's CE Primary School, Skegby
- St Anne's CE Primary School, Worksop
- The St Augustine's Academy, Kilton
- St Edmund Campion RC Primary School, West Bridgford
- St Edmund's CE Primary School, Mansfield Woodhouse
- St John the Baptist CE Primary School, Colwick
- St John's CE Academy, Worksop
- St John's CE Primary School, Stapleford
- St Joseph's RC Primary School, Boughton
- St Joseph's RC Primary School, Retford
- St Luke's CE Primary School, Shireoaks
- St Mary Magdalene CE Primary School, Sutton-in-Ashfield
- St Mary's CE Primary School, Edwinstowe
- St Matthew's CE Primary School, Normanton on Trent
- St Patrick's RC Primary School, Bircotes
- St Patrick's RC Primary School, Mansfield
- St Peter's CE Junior School, Ruddington
- St Peter's CE Primary Academy, Mansfield
- St Peter's CE Primary School Gringley on the Hill
- St Peter's CE Primary School, Farndon
- St Philip Neri With St Bede RC Academy, Mansfield
- St Swithun's CE Primary Academy, Retford
- St Wilfrid's CE Primary School, Calverton
- Samuel Barlow Primary Academy, Clipstone
- Selston CE Infant School, Selston
- Serlby Park Academy, Bircotes
- Sherwood Junior School, Warsop
- The Sir Donald Bailey Academy, Newark
- Sir Edmund Hillary Primary School, Kilton
- Sir John Sherbrooke Junior School, Calverton
- Skegby Junior Academy, Skegby
- Sparken Hill Academy, Worksop
- Springbank Academy, Eastwood
- Standhill Infants' School, Carlton
- Stanhope Primary School, Gedling
- Sturton CE Primary School, Sturton le Steeple
- Sunnyside Spencer Academy, Beeston
- Sutton Bonington Primary School, Sutton Bonington
- Sutton Road Primary School, Mansfield
- Sutton-cum-Lound CE School, Sutton cum Lound
- Sutton-on-Trent Primary School, Sutton-on-Trent
- Thrumpton Primary Academy, Retford
- Tollerton Primary School, Tollerton
- Toton Banks Road Infant School, Toton
- Trent Vale Infant School, Beeston
- Trowell CE Primary School, Trowell
- Tuxford Primary Academy, Tuxford
- Underwood CE Primary School, Underwood
- Wadsworth Fields Primary School, Stapleford
- Wainwright Primary Academy, Mansfield
- Walesby CE Primary School, Walesby
- Walkeringham Primary School, Walkeringham
- West Bridgford Infant School, West Bridgford
- West Bridgford Junior School, West Bridgford
- The West Park Academy, Kirkby-in-Ashfield
- Westdale Infant School, Mapperley
- Westdale Junior School, Mapperley
- Westwood Infant School, Jacksdale
- William Lilley Infant School, Stapleford
- Willoughby Primary School, Willoughby on the Wolds
- Willow Brook Primary School, Keyworth
- Willow Farm Primary School, Gedling
- Winthorpe Primary School, Winthorpe
- Woodland View Primary School, Huthwaite
- Wood's Foundation CE Primary School, Woodborough
- Woodthorpe Infant School, Woodthorpe
- Worksop Priory CE Primary Academy, Worksop
- Wynndale Primary School, Mansfield

=== Secondary schools ===
- Alderman White School, Bramcote
- All Saints' Catholic Academy, Mansfield
- Arnold Hill Academy, Arnold
- Ashfield School, Kirkby-in-Ashfield
- The Becket School, West Bridgford
- Bramcote College, Bramcote
- The Brunts Academy, Mansfield
- The Carlton Academy, Carlton
- Carlton le Willows Academy, Gedling
- Chilwell School, Beeston
- Christ the King Catholic Voluntary Academy, Arnold
- Colonel Frank Seely Academy, Calverton
- The Dukeries Academy, New Ollerton
- East Leake Academy, East Leake
- The Elizabethan Academy, Retford
- The Garibaldi School, Forest Town
- George Spencer Academy, Stapleford
- Hall Park Academy, Eastwood
- The Holgate Academy, Hucknall
- Joseph Whitaker School, Rainworth
- Kimberley School, Kimberley
- Magnus Church of England Academy, Newark-on-Trent
- The Manor Academy, Mansfield Woodhouse
- Meden School, Warsop
- The Minster School, Southwell
- The National Academy, Hucknall
- The Newark Academy, Balderton
- Outwood Academy Kirkby, Kirkby-in-Ashfield
- Outwood Academy Portland, Worksop
- Outwood Academy Valley, Worksop
- Quarrydale Academy, Sutton-in-Ashfield
- Queen Elizabeth's Academy, Mansfield
- Redhill Academy, Arnold
- Retford Oaks Academy, Retford
- Rushcliffe School, West Bridgford
- Samworth Church Academy, Mansfield
- Selston High School, Selston
- Serlby Park Academy, Bircotes
- South Nottinghamshire Academy, Radcliffe-on-Trent
- South Wolds Academy, Keyworth
- The Suthers School, Fernwood
- Sutton Community Academy, Sutton-in-Ashfield
- Toot Hill School, Bingham
- Tuxford Academy, Tuxford
- West Bridgford School, West Bridgford

=== Special and alternative schools ===
- Ash Lea School, Cotgrave
- The Beech Academy, Mansfield
- Bracken Hill School, Kirkby-in-Ashfield
- Carlton Digby School, Mapperley
- Derrymount School, Arnold
- Fountaindale School, Mansfield
- Foxwood Academy, Bramcote
- Newark Orchard School, Balderton
- Redgate Primary Academy, Mansfield
- St Giles School, Retford
- Yeoman Park Academy, Mansfield Woodhouse

=== Further education ===
- Central College Nottingham
- Lincoln College
- New College Nottingham
- North Nottinghamshire College
- Portland College
- Vision West Nottinghamshire College

== Independent schools ==
=== Primary and preparatory schools ===
- Colston Bassett School, Colston Bassett
- Highfields School, Newark-on-Trent
- Plumtree School, Plumtree
- Salterford House School, Calverton
- Saville House School, Mansfield Woodhouse
- Wellow House School, Wellow
- The Worksop Montessori School, Worksop

=== Senior and all-through schools ===
- Worksop College, Worksop

=== Special and alternative schools ===
- A Place to Call Our Own, Mansfield
- Blue Mountain Education, Cossall
- Dawn House School, Rainworth
- Easthorpe School, Ruddington
- Hope House School, Balderton
- Pollyteach, Kirkby-in-Ashfield
- Progression 2work Wrap-Around Learning Hub, Newthorpe
- REAL Alternative Provision School, Mansfield
- REAL Independent School, Blidworth
- Venture Learning, Netherfield
- Westbourne School, Sutton-in-Ashfield
- Wings School, Kirklington

=== Further education ===
- The School of Artisan Food
