= Amanda Solloway =

British politician

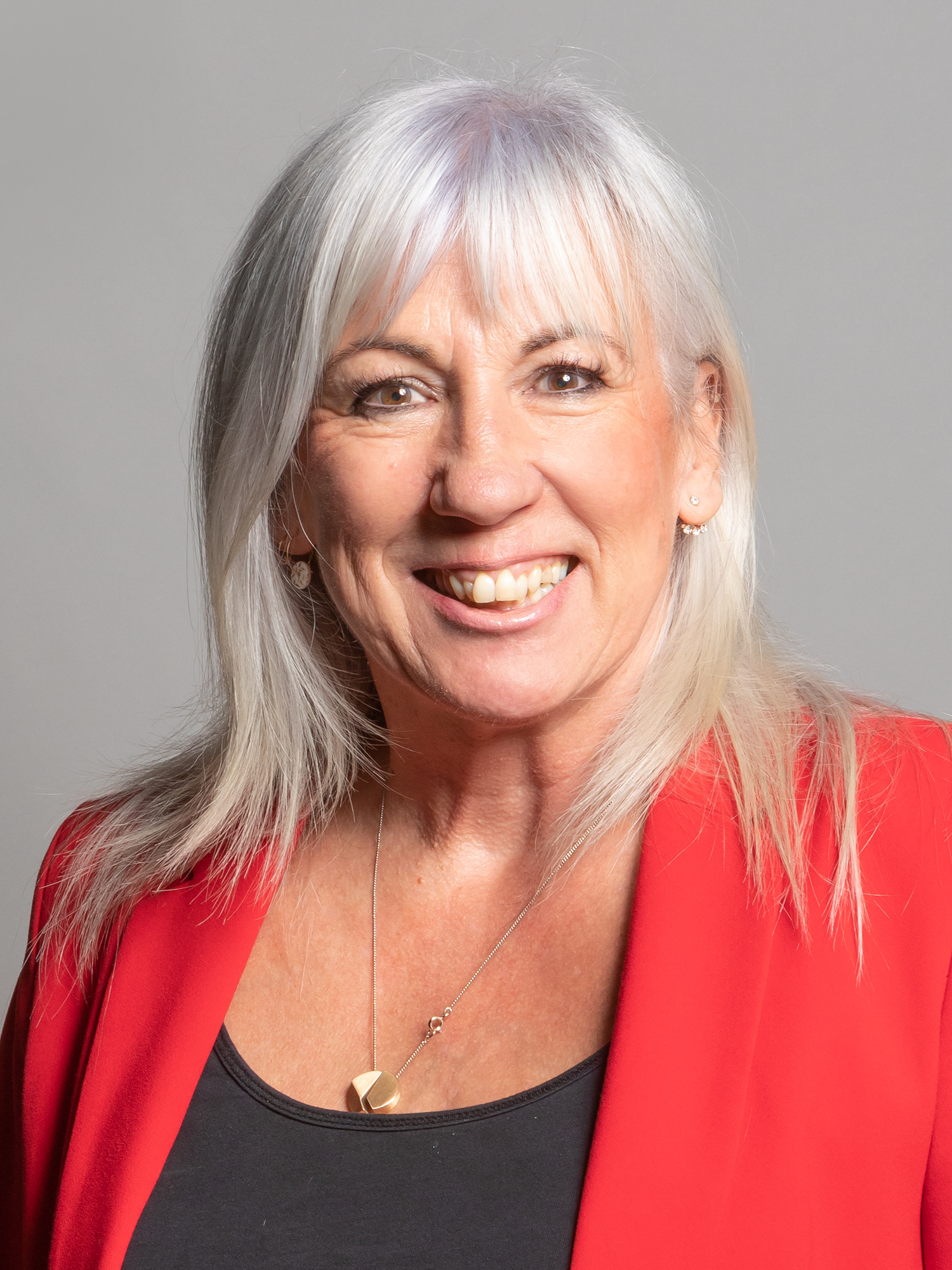
- Official portrait, 2020

Parliamentary Under-Secretary of State for Affordability and Skills (Note: As Parliamentary Under-Secretary of State for Energy Consumers and Affordability until January 2024.)
- In office 7 February 2023 – 5 July 2024
- Prime Minister: Rishi Sunak
- Preceded by: Office established
- Succeeded by: Miatta Fahnbulleh

Lord Commissioner of the Treasury
- In office 20 September 2022 – 5 July 2024
- Prime Minister: Liz Truss; Rishi Sunak
- In office 17 September 2021 – 8 July 2022
- Prime Minister: Boris Johnson
- Preceded by: Maggie Throup

Parliamentary Under-Secretary of State for Equalities
- In office 8 July 2022 – 20 September 2022
- Prime Minister: Boris Johnson
- Preceded by: Mike Freer
- Succeeded by: The Baroness Stedman-Scott

Parliamentary Under-Secretary of State for Safeguarding
- In office 8 July 2022 – 20 September 2022
- Prime Minister: Boris Johnson
- Preceded by: Rachel Maclean
- Succeeded by: Mims Davies

Parliamentary Under-Secretary of State for Science, Research and Innovation
- In office 14 February 2020 – 16 September 2021
- Prime Minister: Boris Johnson
- Preceded by: Chris Skidmore (Note: As Minister of State for Universities, Science, Research and Innovation.)
- Succeeded by: George Freeman

Member of Parliament for Derby North
- In office 12 December 2019 – 30 May 2024
- Preceded by: Chris Williamson
- Succeeded by: Catherine Atkinson
- In office 7 May 2015 – 3 May 2017
- Preceded by: Chris Williamson
- Succeeded by: Chris Williamson

Personal details
- Born: Amanda Jane Solloway; 6 June 1961 Nottingham, England
- Party: Conservative
- Website: amandasolloway.org.uk

Amanda Jane Solloway (née Edghill, 6 June 1961) is a British politician who served as Lord Commissioner of the Treasury from September 2022 to July 2024 and Parliamentary Under-Secretary of State for Affordability and Skills from February 2023 to July 2024. A member of the Conservative Party, she was the Member of Parliament (MP) for Derby North between 2019 and 2024, having previously served from 2015 to 2017.

== Education and pre-parliamentary career ==
Amanda Jane Edghill was born on 6 June 1961 in Nottingham. She has a younger sister and brother. She was educated at Bramcote Hills Grammar School in Bramcote, Nottinghamshire, which became comprehensive in 1978.

She started working at the age of 16 behind the counter of an off-licence before working as a management trainee at Sainsbury's supermarket where she stayed for 13 years. She then spent 15 years in human resources at charities Help the Aged and Save the Children, and in the private sector at Baird Clothing Group. In 2008 she founded her own management consultancy Amanda Solloway Limited.

== Parliamentary career ==
=== First term (2015-17) ===
Solloway was first elected at the 2015 general election for the Derby North constituency, with a majority of 41 votes, unseating the Labour MP Chris Williamson, who had been the MP for the seat since 2010. She became a parliamentary private secretary to the minister of state for the Department of International Development.

Solloway campaigned for improving provision for mental health and homelessness in Derby North and in Parliament.

Solloway lost her seat at the 2017 general election to Williamson, on a night where Labour made gains across the United Kingdom. She continued to be active in Derby North, including in the 2018 Derby City Council election and 2019 Derby City Council election, where the Conservatives made gains in the Derby North constituency wards.

=== Second Term (2019-24) ===
She regained Derby North for the Conservatives at the 2019 general election with a majority of 2,540, with Williamson (standing as an independent) in sixth place.

Following Derby County FC's decision to enter administration in September 2021 Solloway played a prominent role in the campaign to save the club from potential expulsion from the English Football League. Amanda organised the formation of the "Team Derby" campaign, composed of other local MPs and Derby City Council, and facilitated meetings between "Team Derby", administrators Quantuma, the then Sports Minister Nigel Huddleston and the EFL on multiple occasions. Solloway has credited helping to save the club from administration as her "single most important thing" she did while the MP for Derby North.

From May to July 2022, Amanda has campaigned on behalf of constituents in Darley Abbey, following the closure of the Darley Abbey Bridge, for the installation of a temporary replacement. Following news that Derby City Council had agreed to purchase the temporary structure and keep it in place until 2027, Solloway has campaigned for a permanent alternative instead. This campaign included a visit to Darley Abbey by both the Parliamentary Under-Secretary of State for Arts and Heritage Lord Parkinson in April 2024 the Parliamentary Under-Secretary of State for Roads Guy Opperman in May 2024.

Between July 5, 2022 and the 21st of March 2023, Solloway successfully campaigned for Derby to be chosen as the location for the Department for Transport's Great British Railways Headquarters. Her efforts included asking constituents to vote for Derby by scanning a QR code printed on a T-shirt she wore at constituency events and by holding meetings with the Secretary of State for Transport Mark Harper and Minister of State for Rail and HS2 Huw Merriman.

In October 2023, rollingstock manufacturer Alstom announced that its Derby factory Litchurch Lane could close if orders were not found to fill a production gap at the site, putting over 1,000 jobs at risk of redundancy. Solloway described her work to address this as her "main priority" over the following eight months until, in June 2024, a deal between Alstom and Transport for London, financed by £220 million of Department for Transport funding was agreed for an order of 10 Elizabeth line trains. Over this period Solloway routinely met with the Secretary of State for Transport Mark Harper who stated Solloway "deserved a lot of credit for her absolutely tenacious campaigning" for a solution for Alstom's production gap.

=== Ministerial responsibilities (2020-24) ===
On 14 February 2020, Solloway was appointed Parliamentary Under Secretary of State for Science, Research and Innovation at the Department for Business, Energy and Industrial Strategy during the first cabinet reshuffle of the second Johnson ministry. On 17 September 2021, Solloway was appointed a lord commissioner of the Treasury (Government whip) during the second cabinet reshuffle of the second Johnson ministry.

Solloway then served as Parliamentary Under-Secretary of State for Equalities and Parliamentary Under-Secretary of State for Safeguarding from July to September 2022. She was also Parliamentary Under-Secretary of State for Science, Research and Innovation from February 2020 to September 2021.

She was appointed Parliamentary Under Secretary of State (Minister for Energy Consumers and Affordability) at the Department for Energy Security and Net Zero on 7 February 2023. In this role, Solloway was responsible for energy affordability, energy bill support schemes, fuel poverty, the Department's oversight of Ofgem, and green skills, jobs and education. In her role, Solloway implemented measures to end the "prepayment premium" which saw energy customers who used prepayment meters pay higher energy prices than those who paid using direct debit. She also oversaw the Government's response to significant increases in energy prices following the Russian invasion of Ukraine in 2022. She was the Minister responsible for supervising the delivery of the Energy Price Guarantee, and both the Energy Bills Relief Scheme and Energy Bill Support Scheme which among other measures, dispensed roughly £40 billion of support to energy consumers in the UK between 2022 and 2023.

== Post-parliamentary career ==
Following her defeat at the 2024 UK General Election, Solloway was appointed as Director at the Advertising Standards Authority (ASA). Solloway has also founded her own mental health charity, Head High.

== Personal life ==
Solloway lives in Derbyshire and was patron of the Friends Of The Baby Unit at Royal Derby Hospital. She ran the London Marathon, in 2016 and 2017, and, in doing so, raised money for the hospital's baby unit.

She is also a Trustee at the Landau Forte Charitable Trust which runs 6 school academies across the Midlands.

== Controversies ==
In May 2023, Solloway paid an £80 fixed penalty notice which was issued on 2 July 2020 for a missed congestion charge payment, which had been paid through her expenses, according to the Independent Parliamentary Standards Authority's (IPSA) expenses register.

== Notes ==
Parliament of the United Kingdom
Preceded by Chris Williamson	Member of Parliament for Derby North; 2015–2017	Succeeded by Chris Williamson
Preceded by Chris Williamson	Member of Parliament for Derby North; 2019–2024	Succeeded by Catherine Atkinson
Political offices
Preceded by Chris Skidmore as Minister of State for Universities, Science, Research and Innovation	Parliamentary Under-Secretary of State for Science, Research and Innovation; 2020–2021	Succeeded by George Freeman
Preceded by Rachel Maclean	Parliamentary Under-Secretary of State for Safeguarding; 2022–present	Succeeded by Mims Davies
Preceded by Mike Freer	Parliamentary Under-Secretary of State for Equalities; 2022–present	Succeeded by Baroness Stedman-Scott
