= Chilwell School =

Secondary school in Nottinghamshire, England

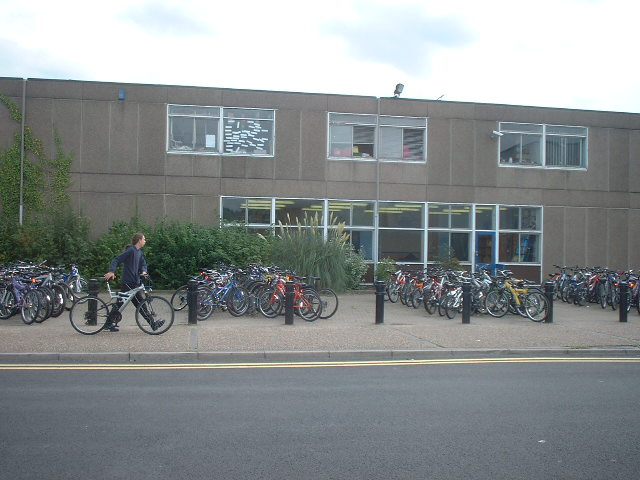
- Part of the school pictured in 2005

Location
- Queens Road West; Nottingham, Nottinghamshire, NG9 5AL; England; 52°54′43″N 1°13′54″W

Information
- Type: Foundation school
- Established: 1972
- Local authority: Nottinghamshire
- Department for Education URN: 122854 Tables
- Ofsted: Reports
- Chair of covernors: Andy Palmer
- Head teacher: Sarah York
- Gender: Coeducational
- Age: 11 to 18
- Enrolment: roughly 1,000
- Colour
- Alumni name: Old Chilwellians
- Website: http://www.chilwellschool.co.uk

Chilwell School (formerly known as Chilwell Comprehensive School) is a secondary school located in Chilwell, near Nottingham, England. The school also hosts the Chilwell Olympia sports complex and has an attached sixth-form centre. In January 2005, the school was designated a specialist school in Arts and Maths and Computing.

The school's typical enrolment is around 1,000 students aged 11 to 18, of which roughly 100 are enrolled at the sixth-form.

The Chilwell Sixth-Form was formerly known as Lakeview College and was run in collaboration with nearby school Alderman White. In September 2006, Chilwell School governors made the decision that the college would be entirely managed and staffed by Chilwell School from September 2008.

== Curriculum ==
The school follows the National Curriculum.

=== Specialist areas ===
In January 2005, the school was designated a specialist school in Arts and Maths and Computing.

=== Arts ===
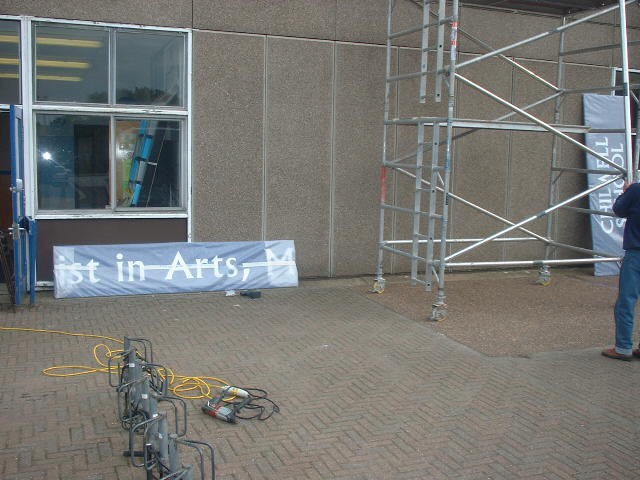
School banner demonstrating its specialist status in the Arts

As a result of the school's specialist status, the curriculum was re-designed to integrate ICT into art and textile design: textile art was designed by students while they learnt CAD/CAM skills. One of the aims of the programme was to combat gender stereotyping. Thanks to the programme's success, the school was named a "Textile Centre for Excellence" and was featured in an Adobe case study. The students' work was also exhibited at a local gallery.

=== Computing ===
The school was a regional host for the Adobe/MTV Boom Music Video Academy in 2006, and had a computer suite donated by the company Educational Ideas in 2004.

=== BAC^{3} ===
BAC³ was a project for gifted and talented pupils run by Chilwell in collaboration with Alderman White School and The Bramcote School. It involved pupils from each school taking part in "activities days" reflecting the schools' respective specialisms.

== Ofsted inspections ==
Ofsted ratings below refer to the "overall effectiveness" of the school.

- 2006 - "Good" (Grade 2). The school was featured in the Nottingham Post following this inspection.
- 2009 - "Inadequate" (Grade 4).
- 2010 - "Satisfactory" (Grade 3).
- 2012 - "Requires Improvement" (Grade 3). Note the change in nomenclature between 2010 and 2012; the school remained at Grade 3.
- 2014 - "Good" (Grade 2).

Following the 2014 inspection (carried out on 7–8 October 2014) the report observed, "[e]ffective leadership has led to consistently good teaching and achievement across the school."

Chilwell School has received two ungraded inspections since 2014; in 2018 and 2024. In both cases Ofsted's report observed that "Chilwell School continues to be a good school."

== Extra-curricular activities ==
=== Another Day film: The Project ===
In 2006, as part of a media initiative known as The Project, students at Chilwell produced a short film entitled Another Day. After starting as a pupil-run media literacy initiative, The Project eventually involved a large portion of the school in the film's planning, writing and production. The film premiered at the Broadway Cinema in Nottingham and was screened at the August 2006 Bang! Film Festival.

The Project featured in the Nottingham Post on numerous occasions and was covered by the BBC.

=== The Feeling music video: The Project 2 ===
As a result of the Another Day film project, pupils were offered the opportunity to make a music video for English rock band The Feeling. The band offered a B-side track ("Sun is Shining") for the music video. The project was again led by students, overseen by media teachers. In December 2006, while still in its early stages, The Project 2 received local media coverage.

=== Debating Matters competition ===
In 2010 and 2013, Chilwell Sixth-Form students reached the national finals of the Debating Matters competition in London.

== Buildings ==
The school was constructed in two stages. The main quadrangle of buildings was envisaged as an Upper School for pupils aged 13–16 and was constructed during 1970-71, followed shortly after by the sports facilities that are shared with Chilwell Olympia.

A Lower School building to the designs of the architects Michael Tempest and Roger Bearsmore of Nottinghamshire County Council was constructed to the south-west of the main quadrangle in 1975-76. The building is unusual in that it has an open-plan central mezzanine level linked to classroom spaces on the ground and first floors.

During the late 1970s, as pupil numbers expanded above the maximum capacity at the Chilwell campus, the school temporarily used the former premises of Nether Street School in Beeston to provide additional classrooms to teach Year 7 pupils (then known as first years).

With declining school rolls, the Lower School building was converted for use as a sixth-form centre from 1984.

The school buildings were all constructed using the CLASP pre-fabricated system.

In October 2018, the former Lower School building (now the Sixth-Form centre) was listed as Grade II building. The Historic England designation gave the following principal reasons for its architectural interest:

- It is an example of a school built using the CLASP system (a system of pre-fabrication pioneered by Nottinghamshire County Council). As the first building system consciously designed for building on ground liable to movement, it represented an engineering breakthrough that influenced architecture not just in Britain but internationally.
- The unusual formal quality of the elevations show CLASP Mark V at its best.
- The resource centre (now the Sixth-Form centre), which was regarded as an essential facility for extending the investigatory style of learning from primary into secondary education, was realised in a two-storey building through the distinctive innovation of a central space occupying a mezzanine area which connects spatially and functionally to all other areas of the building.
- The collaboration between architects and educationalists successfully provided a planning solution to the pedagogical philosophy of the day, clearly demonstrating the aspirations of a progressive educational authority.
- The planned form has survived with very little alteration, and the like-for-like replacement of doors and windows has preserved the original architectural character of the building.

In December 2022, it was announced that the school would be rebuilt and refurbished (alongside five other Nottinghamshire schools) as part of a ten-year School Rebuilding Programme.

== Notable alumni ==
- Tina Stowell, Baroness Stowell of Beeston - Leader of the House of Lords, July 2014 – July 2016.
- Ann-Marie Farren - World Women's Snooker Championship winner (1987) & runner up (1988, 1989); British Ladies’ Snooker Champion (1994).
- Sophia Di Martino - English actress.
- Steve Scoffham - English former professional footballer who played as a striker.

== See also ==
- Listed buildings in Attenborough and Chilwell
