= Bramcote Hills =

Coordinates: 52.94°N 01.24°W

- Location within Nottinghamshire
- District: Broxtowe
- Shire county: Nottinghamshire
- Region: East Midlands
- Country: England
- Sovereign state: United Kingdom
- Post town: NOTTINGHAM
- Postcode district: NG9
- Dialling code: 0115
- Police: Nottinghamshire
- Fire: Nottinghamshire
- Ambulance: East Midlands
- UK Parliament: Broxtowe

Bramcote Hills forms the northern area of the village and Nottingham suburb of Bramcote, Nottinghamshire, built in the 1950s. It is separated from the main part of the village by the A52 Derby Road (the Brian Clough Way). It takes the name from an old family seat of Bramcote Hills, the home of the Sherwin and Sherwin-Gregory family.

To the north is Bramcote Ridge, Bramcote Moor and Wollaton. To the southeast is the town of Beeston.

The Bramcote Hills Sport & Community College was located in the area — now the site is part of the Alderman White School and Language College. This together with the nearby Bramcote College forms the White Hills Park Federation. The Bramcote Hills Primary School is also based in Bramcote Hills.

Bramcote Hills Park is a stretch of woodland and fields that used to be a part of the manor house, but the house was demolished in 1968 and its grounds became the public park. You can still see the manor house ruins in Bramcote Hills Park today.
