= Elain Harwood =

British architectural historian (1958–2023)

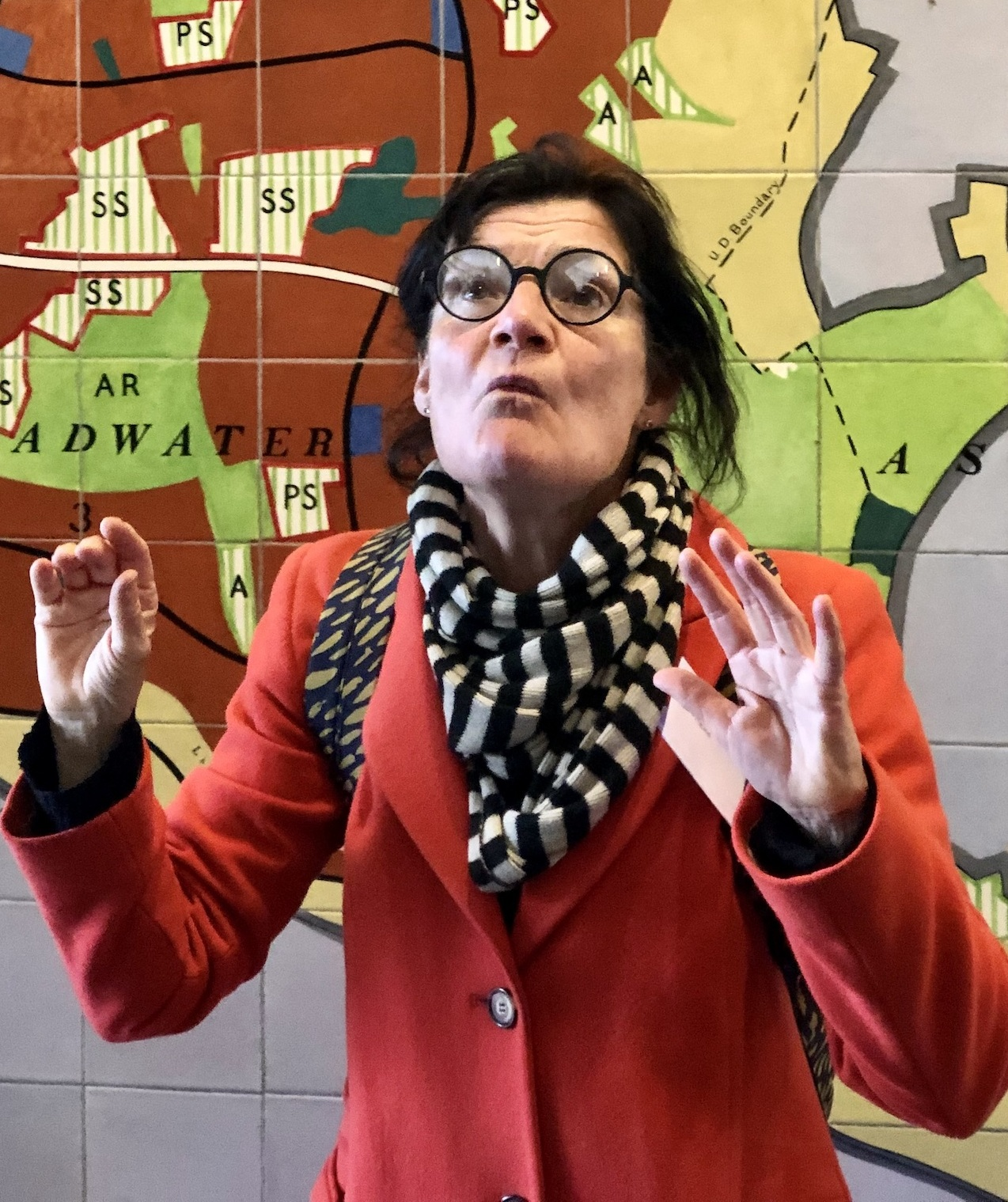
- Harwood in 2022 speaking at the launch of Stevenage: Pioneering New Town Centre, standing in front of a mural showing the Town Plan of Stevenage
- Born: 10 June 1958; Nottingham, England
- Died: April 2023 (age 64)
- Education: University of Bristol
- Occupations: Architectural historian Author

Elain Harwood Hon.FRIBA (10 June 1958 – April 2023) was a British architectural historian with Historic England and a specialist in post–Second World War English architecture.

== Early life and education ==
Harwood was born on 10 June 1958 in Beeston, Nottinghamshire. She was the daughter of Harold Harwood and Maureen (née Chadwick) and elder sister to her brother David. She attended Bramcote Hills Grammar School before reading history at Bristol University. She studied building conservation at the Architectural Association between 1984 and 1986. She completed a PhD on the building of London's South Bank at Bristol University in 2010.

== Career ==
Of the influence modernist architecture in the East Midlands had on her as a child, she said that "every escape from the normal and humdrum was in buildings from the Fifties and Sixties – the theatre, the swimming baths, the library".

Bristol's derelict terraces and docklands were what first drew her to the city, but it was also the home of the architect Berthold Lubetkin, and an exhibition of his work together with the Thirties exhibition at the Hayward Gallery in 1979 kindled Harwood's interest in modernism and the modern buildings of her childhood – schools and the Nottingham Playhouse.

Harwood was an active member of the Cinema Theatre Association, the Thirties Society (later The Twentieth Century Society), The Victorian Society and the Society of Architectural Historians of Great Britain.

=== Historic England ===
Harwood took a temporary job in January 1984 at what was to become English Heritage (later Historic England), and remained there for the rest of her career. In 1987 she joined what had been the Greater London Council Historic Buildings Division, by then absorbed into English Heritage, just as research was needed on post-war buildings. Between 1996 and 2004 she was responsible for most of the organisation's recommendations for listing buildings from the period after 1945, as well as for research programmes on earlier cinemas and flats. In 1995 she was responsible for researching the suitability of Jimi Hendrix receiving a blue plaque on Brook Street, Mayfair, about which was said "I think it's the most exciting one we've had for a long time. We've never had a rock musician before." She held the position of senior architectural investigator.

=== Twentieth Century Society ===
Harwood was for many years a nominated Trustee of the Twentieth Century Society and organised many lectures and study visits for the society's members. She helped civic societies, local action groups and individuals across the UK in campaigning to save twentieth-century buildings from inappropriate change and total demolition, and lectured to both lay and academic audiences. She was Joint Series Editor of a series of monographs on Twentieth Century Architects, published by English Heritage and continued by Liverpool University Press. In 2015 she cycled from Paris to Geneva to raise funds for the society's journals.

=== Teaching, presenting and lecturing ===
She was a "major contributor" to Cambridge University's MSt in Building History, developing and teaching Twentieth Century and Post-War programmes. She lectured across the UK and internationally.

She was a presenter on BBC Two's One Foot in the Past series in the 1990s. She led walking, cycling and coach tours around interesting architectural locations.

== Awards and honours ==
2016 – Space, Hope and Brutalism, a project that Harwood developed over 18 years, won the Alice Davis Hitchcock Medallion from the Society of Architectural Historians of Great Britain.

2022 – Awarded an Honorary Fellowship of RIBA

== Selected publications ==
=== 1990s ===
- Exploring England's Heritage: London. London: Her Majesty's Stationery Office in association with English Heritage. 1991. ISBN 0113000324. (with Andrew Saint)
- Lubetkin and progressive socialism in the Metropolitan Borough of Finsbury (with Andrew Saint and David Gander), Twentieth Century Society, 1993
- Tayler and Green, Architects 1938–1973: The Spirit of Place in Modern Housing. The Prince of Wales's Institute of Architecture, London 1998. (with Alan Powers) ISBN 1 898465 21 5

=== 2000s ===
- Festival of Britain (with Alan Powers) Twentieth Century Architecture, 2001
- England: A Guide to Post-war Listed Buildings Historic England, B. T. Batsford, 2003.
- The Heroic Period of Conservation (with Alan Powers). Twentieth Century Architecture, 2006
- The Sixties: Life, Style, Architecture (with Alan Powers) 2006
- Housing the Twentieth Century Nation (with Alan Powers). 2008
- Nottingham: City Guide. Pevsner Architectural Guides: City Guides, 2008

=== 2010s ===
- England's Schools: History, Architecture and Adaptation. 2010. (Informed Conservation)
- Chamberlin, Powell and Bon (in the 20th Century Architects series). RIBA Enterprises, London 2011.
- London Buildings: An Architectural Tour by Hannah Dipper (contributor) Batsford, 2011.
- The Seventies: Rediscovering a Lost Decade of British Architecture The Twentieth Century Society, 2012.
- Twentieth Century Architecture: Oxford and Cambridge Volume 11. 2013. (with Alan Powers)
- England's Post-War Listed Buildings. 2015. (with James O. Davies)
- Houses: Regional Practice and Local Character. 2015. (with Alan Powers)
- Space, Hope, and Brutalism: English Architecture, 1945–1975. Paul Mellon Centre for Studies in British Art. 2015.
- The English Public Library 1945–85: Introductions to Heritage Assets. 2016.
- 100 Houses: 100 Years (with Susannah Charlton) Batsford, 2017.
- Pomo: Postmodern Buildings in Britain (with Geraint Franklin). Batsford, 2017.
- Ernő Goldfinger. 2017. (with Alan Powers) (in the 20th Century Architects series)
- Art Deco Britain: Buildings of the Inter-War Years. Pavilion Books, London, 2019 ISBN 9781849945271

=== 2020s ===
- The Heroic Period of Conservation: Vol 7. Paul Holberton Publishing, 2020
- Mid-Century Britain: Modern Architecture 1938–1963. Pavilion Books, 2021
- Stevenage: Pioneering New Town Centre (with Emily Cole). Historic England in association with Liverpool University Press, 2021
- Ernő Goldfinger (with Alan Powers). Liverpool University Press in association with the Twentieth Century Society, 2024
- New Towns Mark One: Architecture and Planning in Post-War Britain (edited by Alistair Fair). Historic England in association with Liverpool University Press, 2026

=== Other writing ===
- Harwood wrote architecture-specific obituaries for The Guardian for over 20 years.
- Between 2009 and 2021 she was a contributor to the Oxford Dictionary of National Biography, publishing the biographies of Patricia Randall Tindale and Sir Hubert Bennett among others.
- She was co-editor of the Twentieth Century Society Journal.
- She was a contributor to The RIBA Journal
- She was a contributor to Excavate! The Wonderful and Frightening World of the Fall ed. Tessa Norton and Bob Stanley. Faber, 2021

== Death and tributes ==
Harwood was found dead on 19 April 2023. Her cause of death was found to be streptococcal meningitis.

Ben Derbyshire, the former president of the Royal Institute of British Architects, described her death as a "huge loss to Historic England, heritage in general, C20th architecture in particular and anyone who knew and enjoyed her amazing spirit". The architectural critic Hugh Pearman called her "the great and ever enthusiastic chronicler of British post-war architecture."

The director of Save Britain's Heritage, Henrietta Billings, said that "the rising levels of public interest in Brutalism and other previously unloved periods of modern architecture are largely down to her". The chief executive of Historic England, Duncan Wilson, described her as "outstanding in her field, a fierce advocate for twentieth-century architecture and a true heritage champion". The director of the Twentieth Century Society, Catherine Croft, praised her "unmatched expertise, enthusiasm and generosity" and went on to describe her legacy as incomparable.
