= Platelet (disambiguation) =

A platelet is a component of blood.

Platelet or Platelets may also refer to:

- Platelet (horse), a racehorse
- Platelets (journal), a scholarly journal
- Diamond platelet, a crystallographic defect of diamond
- Tectonic platelet, a minor tectonic plate
