= Frances Longden Almshouses =

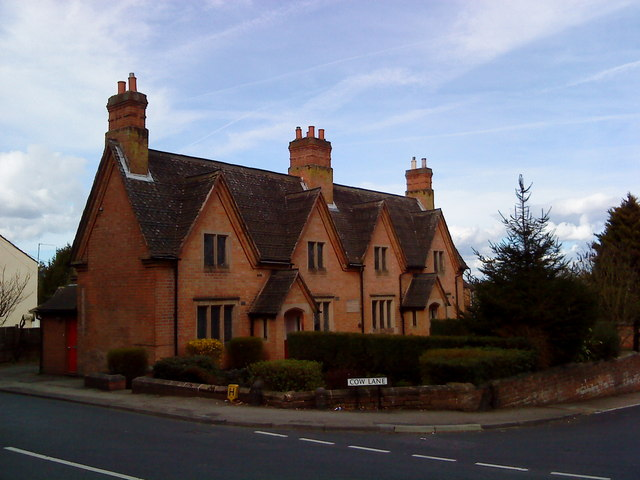

- Location within Nottinghamshire
- 52°55′58.3″N 1°14′41.74″W
- Location: Bramcote, Nottinghamshire, England

History
- Built: 1852

Site notes
- Restored: 1984
- Restored by: Broxtowe Borough Council

Listed Building – Grade II

The Frances Jane Longden Almshouses were erected in 1852 in Bramcote, Nottinghamshire, for four poor women.

The patron was Frances Jane Longden, the sister of John Sherwin Gregory of Bramcote Manor. She endowed the almshouses to provide accommodation for four poor women of the parish who were to receive two shillings weekly and two tons of coal each year. The datestone is located just off centre of the building with the wording “Almshouses erected by Frances Jane Longden 1852”

The almshouses are situated at the top of Cow Lane, Bramcote.

Nottingham Community Housing Association assumed ownership in 2007, and the independent charity 244900 which had formerly managed the housing was closed.

== See also ==
- Listed buildings in Bramcote
