= Listed buildings in Bramcote =

Bramcote is a village in the Borough of Broxtowe, Nottinghamshire, England. It contains twelve listed buildings that are recorded in the National Heritage List for England. Of these, one is listed at Grade II*, the middle of the three grades, and the others are at Grade II, the lowest grade. Most of the listed buildings are houses and associated structures, and the others consist of a church, the tower of a demolished church, a public house, and a row of almshouses.

== Key ==
Grade	Criteria
II*	Particularly important buildings of more than special interest
II	Buildings of national importance and special interest

== Buildings ==
Name and location	Photograph	Date	Notes	Grade
Tower of Church of St. Michael; 52.93240°N 1.24525°W		14th century	The surviving tower of a church demolished in about 1860. It is in stone on a chamfered plinth, with two stages, a string course, an eaves band]], and an embattled parapet. On the east side is a doorway with dogtooth moulding and a hood mould, and on the south side is a blocked doorway. Elsewhere, there are lancet windows.	II
The Manor House and terrace 52.93112°N 1.24335°W	—	1625	The house incorporates material from an earlier manor house, and is in timber framing and brick, on plinths of brick and stone, with stone dressings, a moulded floor band and eaves band, and tile roofs with shouldered coped gables. There are two storeys, attics and a basement, and an L-shaped plan with fronts of two bays. In the angle is a doorway with a chamfered surround and an elliptical head. Most of the windows are mullioned casements. The adjoining terrace is in stone and brick, with half-round steps, and a wrought iron] balustrade with lyre designs.	II*
Gateway, walls and shed, Bramcote Manor; 52.93083°N 1.24328°W	—	c. 1675	The wall is in stone and brick on a deep chamfered plinth, and has gabled stone coping and buttresses. It has an L-shaped plan, and extends for about 50 metres (160 ft). The gateway to the south has a hood mould and a square gable, and it contains an ornate wrought iron gate. To the left is a brick lean-to shed with a tile roof.	II
101 Town Street; 52.93210°N 1.24429°W		Mid 18th century	The house is in pebbledashed brick on a stone plinth, with a moulded floor band, and a tile roof with a coped parapet and gables. There are two storeys and attics, and an L-shaped plan, with a front range of three bays. The central doorway has a moulded surround, and most of the windows are sashes, those on the front with splayed lintels and keystones.	II
The White Lion; 52.93434°N 1.24623°W		Mid 18th century	The public house is in brick on a rendered plinth, with dentilled eaves, and roofs of tile and slate with shouldered coped gables. There are two storeys and an L-shaped plan, with a main range of five bays, a lower two-storey extension with overhanging eaves to the left, and at the rear is a gabled wing, an outbuilding and lean-tos. Steps with a scrolled iron handrail lead up to the doorway that has a fanlight, the windows are a mix of sashes and casements, most with segmental heads, and there is a scrolled iron sign bracket.	II
The Grove; 52.92969°N 1.24323°W		c. 1810	A house, later a college, in colourwashed stucco on a stone plinth, with stone dressings and hipped slate roofs. There are two storeys and a C-shaped plan, with fronts of seven and three bays. On the west front is a roofless Doric portico, and a doorway with an eared architrave. The windows are sashes, one with a round head, and there is a French window.	II
Southfield House, The Cottage and wall 52.92991°N 1.24735°W	—	c. 1820	A house, divided into a house and a cottage, in colourwashed stucco, with a floor band and an impost band, and hipped slate roofs. There are two storeys, a square block of three bays, and a rear wing. The doorway has a reeded surround, and the windows are a mix of sashes and casements. The ground floor windows are set in shallow blind arches, and there is a round-headed stair window. Attached to the house is a five-bay conservatory. The rear wing forms The Cottage, which has casement windows and an oriel window. Adjoining the house is a ramped coped wall and toilet bock, and the boundary wall is rendered and extends for about 30 metres (98 ft).	II
Stables and coach house, Southfield House; 52.93011°N 1.24730°W	—	c. 1820	The stables and coach house are in brick, partly rendered, on a plinth, with dentilled eaves and hipped slate roofs. There are two storeys and an L-shaped plan, with a main range of three bays. The building contains a pair of elliptical-headed carriage doors, doorways with fanlights, and a hoist door. Most of the windows are casements, and there are lunettes and a horizontally-sliding sash window.	II
Broom Hill Terrace; 52.93643°N 1.24778°W		Early 19th century	A terrace of three lacemakers' cottages, later two houses, in red brick, with dentilled eaves and a slate roof. There are three storeys and three bays. On the front are two later porches, and in the right bay is a bow window. The other windows are casements, those in the lower two floors with segmental heads, and in the top floor there are two in each bay.	II
The Grange and Conservatory; 52.93252°N 1.24421°W		c. 1830	The house is in colourwashed stuccoed brick on a stone plinth, and has a hipped slate roof. There are two storeys, and an L-shaped plan, with a central block of three bays, and lower flanking three-bay wings. In the centre is a doorway with a moulded surround and a fanlight, flanking the doorway and above it are Venetian windows and the other windows are sashes. On the garden front is a conservatory in iron and wood on a brick base with a canted end, a bow window with a conical lead roof, and a French window.	II
The Almshouses; 52.93289°N 1.24486°W		1852	A row of four almshouses in brick on a chamfered plinth, with half-round brick eaves and a tile roof. There are two storeys and four bays, with a single-storey extension on the right, and a later continuous rear lean-to. On the front are two gabled porches, and doorways with four-centred arched heads. The windows are mullioned casements with three lights and hood moulds in the ground floor, and with two lights in dormers above. On the front is an inscribed datestone.	II
Church of St Michael and All Angels; 52.93527°N 1.24627°W		1861	Vestries were added to the church in 1952. The church is in stone with slate roofs, and consists of a nave, a south aisle, a chancel, north and west vestries, and a southwest steeple. The steeple has a tower with three stages, a canted stair turret on the northwest, and two string courses, a linked hood mould with finials, and an eaves band with gargoyles. In the bottom stage is a doorway, the middle stage contains a lancet window and quatrefoils, and in the top stage are double bell openings and gabled slit lights each with a crocketed gable and gargoyles. The tower is surmounted by an octagonal broach spire with canopied lancets, quatrefoils and a weathercock.	II
