= Bramcote Hills Sport and Community College =

Location
- Moor Lane, Beeston; Nottingham, Nottinghamshire, NG9 3GA; England; 52°56′32″N 1°14′51″W

Information
- Type: Comprehensive
- Motto: Aiming Higher
- Established: 1978
- Closed: 31 August 2009
- Local authority: Nottinghamshire
- Specialist: Sports
- Department for Education URN: 122852 Tables
- Ofsted: Reports
- Executive Head Teacher: James Gibbons
- Gender: co-educational
- Age: 11 to 18
- Enrolment: 783
- Colours: Black, White & Red
- School Leader: Mal Kerr
- Website: https://web.archive.org/web/20090428052600/http://www.bhscc.notts.sch.uk/

Bramcote Hills Sports and Community College was a mixed state school in Nottinghamshire. It taught children from 11 to 18 (Years 7–13). It is located in Bramcote, Nottinghamshire. It was part of the White Hills Park Federation with Executive Head Teacher, Kevin Dean, the School Leader, Mal Kerr.

Bramcote Hills Sports and Community College was formally closed by Nottinghamshire County Council on 31 August 2009. At the same time the council agreed from 1 September 2009, to enlarge Alderman White School and Language College, to incorporate the remaining site of Bramcote Hills School, following demolition of the unsafe upper school, this making Alderman White a split-site school.

== History ==
Bramcote Hills Technical Grammar Crest

=== Grammar schools ===
The school started life as two separate schools sharing the same campus. Bramcote Hills Technical Grammar which opened in 1955 and Bramcote Hills Grammar School in 1957. The founding head teacher of BHTS was Mr Frank J Cresswell.

On Friday 27 March 1970 at 6.25pm on BBC1, Heat 5 of Television Top of the Form had Bramcote Hills Grammar School, with Josephine Allen, Heath Brooksbank, Peter Stone, Chris Fawson against Leominster Grammar School (now Earl Mortimer College). The team were beaten 34–33.

Following the retirement of Mr Cresswell, who died only a few months after retiring, the two grammar schools which shared the same site merged in 1973 under the Head Mastership of Mr Lyons

=== Comprehensive ===
In 1978 the two merged grammar schools became a comprehensive school, to form Bramcote Hills Comprehensive School (BHCS) under the Leadership of Mr Pitts, succeeded in 1982 by Mr Maltby, until 1996 Ms Nada Trikic.

Under the Head Teacher of Nada Trikic it gained Sports College specialist status in 2004 and was renamed "Bramcote Hills Sports and Community College" "BHSCC" and awarded a grant to improve sporting facilities, this included a regeneration of the schools changing rooms gym extensions and out door surfaces.

Nada Trikic left the school in 2006 to become a HMI Inspector of schools.

In the summer of 2007 the school celebrated "50 Glorious Years" reuniting may old pupils, staff and teachers

2006 saw it join the first federation in Nottinghamshire, under the leadership of a "super head" who was to head 3 schools in the area. The Federation was founded as 2006 all three schools were without Head Teachers, Bramcote Hills Sports & Community College, Bramcote Park Business & Enterprise School and Alderman White School and Language College and all have falling numbers of students on roll The school also had a school leader which was Mal Kerr until he left when the school closed in 2009.

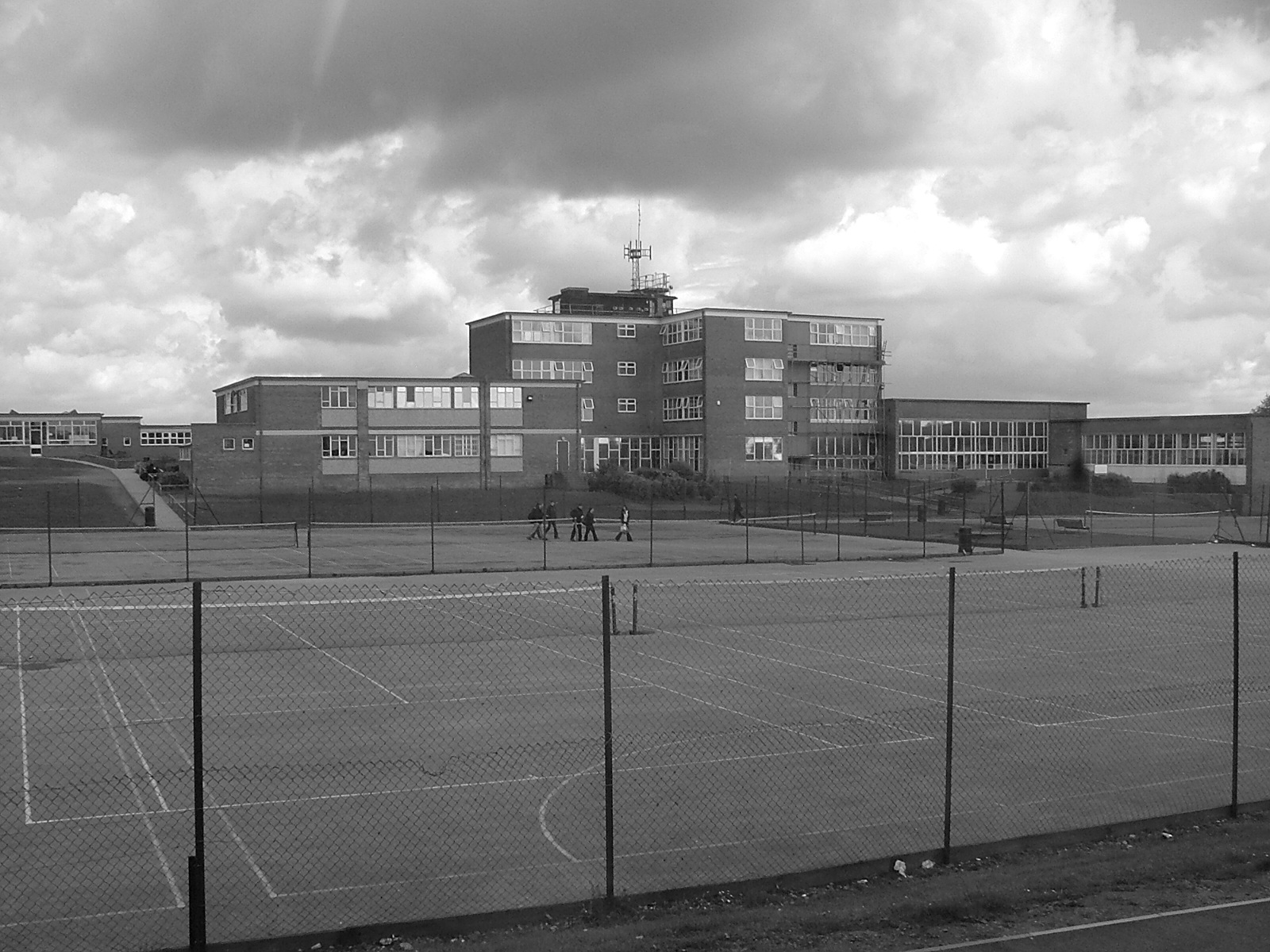
Main School Building (2004)

Bramcote Hills has always organised form groups around the letters B R A M C O T E, coming from the spelling of Bramcote, though falling numbers lead to dropping the "A" form. The school years were originally split in two, grouping BRAM and COTE together for time-table purposes. As numbers on role were falling since 2003 the number of forms has decreased. In 2007 the new intake only had four form groups for year 7 (BRMC) compared to a 7 form entry in 2001. In the 1960s the four form groups were T E C and H, with T being the top stream.

The school closed on 31 August 2009.

== Campus ==
The School is situated in Bramcote Hills on vast campus site which houses other schools, Bramcote Park Business & Enterprise School, Bramcote Hills Primary and Foxwood Foundation School & Technology College within its boundary with Moor Lane, the A52 and Coventry Lane, Bramcote Hills Sports and Community college is accessed by Moor Lane, Bramcote.

The School is built within the broxtowe green belt. A former sand pit known as Bramcote Quarry lies to the west, and is part of the original school campus and is rented to Biffa Waste Services, bringing in rent of £455, and royalties of over £10,000 pa and is being infilled to provide public open space and playing fields for the school in the future (With a view of selling existing playing fields, which are detached from the school site, to housing developers).

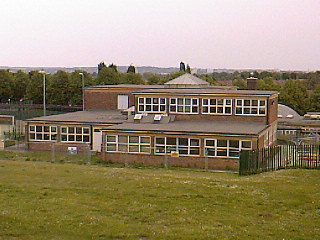
Science Block

The school originally comprised a Main School and an Upper School, separated by tennis courts. The Main School comprises a four-storey tower bock which houses English, Maths and Humanities, along with a gym and technology and drama block, Assembly Hall and recently extended Learning Resource Centre.(Library).

The Upper School consists of Science Block, Music & Art Block, three-story tower block housing business studies, ICT and Modern Languages, and a 6th form Block 'Bramcote College' and a sport halls known as 'The Barn' as this is a converted Dutch barn in 2003 and forms one of the four indoor sports areas. In addition the upper school has another assembly hall used for examinations and is equipped for staging school productions with sound and lighting.

The school unusually had two dining halls which were both extended and refurbished in 2006, one in Main School for years 7-9 and one in Upper School serving 10–13, this is a remnant of the school originally being two separate schools.

The site and school buildings are also host to several mobile communications and radio masts due to its hill location, a mast for T-Mobile was originally sighted on the tower block of the Upper School, however this has been relocated to the corner of the school site where a temporary mast now resides, due to the demolition of the tower. The mobile mast nets the local council in the region of £8000 per annum on a lease till 11 May 2017.

The school also has a large playing field to the north of the site which boarded Coventry Lane accessed by Moor Lane via foot, it also has to the south of the side a large running track and football pitches which are shared with the neighbouring Bramcote Park Business & Enterprise School.

== Bramcote College ==
Bramcote College Logo

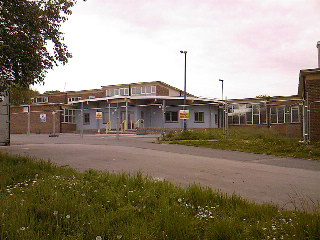
View of Bramcote College £500,000 Extension built in carpark in front of old library, with original 6th form block behind

The school was host in the 1990s to "Park View 6th Form Centre" a shared sixth form facility for both Bramcote Hills Comprehensive and neighbouring Bramcote Park Comprehensive, enabling an intake and catchment from both of the schools. The 6th Form Centre was managed by Mr Andrew Kilgour.

This partnership ended in 2002 and the 6th form was renamed "Bramcote College" and became the sole responsibility of Bramcote Hills Comprehensive School, and came under one budget. Bramcote College took on a new Head of 6th Form in 2004 Mr David Soulsby.

The 6th Form is in a self-contained block of smaller class rooms that were built as part of the grammar school, now a block attached to the upper school. It has its own ICT room, Music Technology Suite and library. There is also a separate dining area for 6th form students in the upper school canteen, which is open throughout the morning till close after lunch, to enable student to purchase breakfast, snacks and pre-order lunch to avoid queuing with school children. In addition there is a large common room, with pool table and vending machine provided by the Students Union, with all profits benefiting the students. Bramcote College remained to have its own individual identity, with separate logos and rules from the main school, for example 6th formers did not have a uniform and with adult environment, students called staff by first names.

The college has always had a strong and involved NUS Student Union. With elected Male & Female Presidents, and Elected Treasurer. The Bramcote College SU had a good community involvement, running Annual Charity Days, and supporting the Nottingham Marathon by providing marshals for a section of the shorter course. The Student's Union also organises an Annual College Ball, for both years 12 & 13 to celebrate the end of term in May, before examinations commence in the summer.

The performance of the 6th Form is always dependent on the intake, as the college does not have any entrance requirements. Results were seen to dip, after the nearby Bilborough College opened its new building, and attracted more students from the school. In 2006 Ofsted found the 6th form to be "Very Good" compared to the whole school which only received a satisfactory rating In 2008 the performance of the college had the highest Contextual Value Added CVA score in the Broxtowe area.

Bramcote College gained a new role following the Federation of Bramcote Hills, with Bramcote Park & Alderman White, becoming the Federation 6th Form. Bramcote Park again are now sharing the 6th Form of Bramcote Hills alongside Alderman White. The name was altered to "Bramcote Hills Sixth Form College". Following the Federation a £500,000 renovation project of the 6th Form accommodation was constructed in 2008. However, as explained below the building work found problems with the structure of the existing building. Following this the 6th Form was moved to the Main School Building, and temporary housed in the Learning Resource Centre, creating a common room and informal learning environment with ICT facilities, similar to that planned in the re-development. David Soulsby left the role of Head of 6th Form in 2008 to be replaced by Faye Parker.

== Recent building developments ==
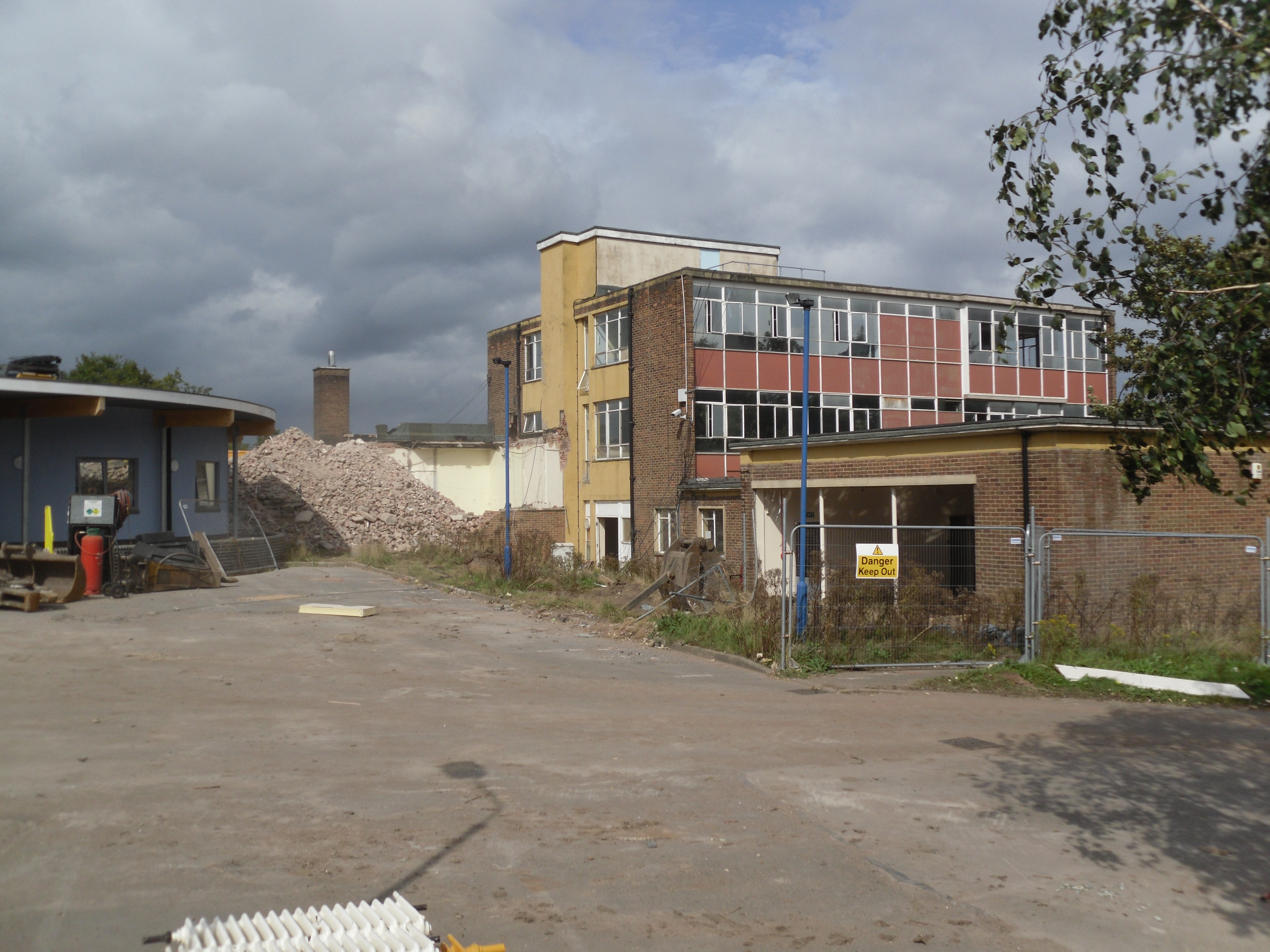
Demolition Work – New £500,000 extension (left) still pre-demolition with old college behind demolished, tower block standing and dance studio (original staff room) without windows

In 2004, plans were submitted for the building of a new technology and art block situated next to the main school site. This was subject to many objections due to the poor design aesthetics, impact on the local landscape, and the fact the school is in the Green Belt. The plans subsequently never got off the drawing board.

In a £500,000 re-development of the 6th form accommodation in 2008 to create a new open plan modern learning environment for post 16 education, including internet cafe and new common room alongside refurbished class rooms with interactive white boards. The new extension was nominated by Broxtowe Borough Council – both for Design and Standard of Construction, in February 2009, however, the nomination could not be founded due to the construction, leading to the findings of structural problems in the existing building.

While completing these works, and re-roofing the building it was discovered to have brittle concrete, the problem was caused by high alumina cement or Calcium aluminate cements, which was used in the construction of buildings in the Nottinghamshire county between the 1950s and 1970s. Subsequently, the refurbished building was never opened to students and the entire building was condemned for use due to its instability. Years 7&8 were moved to the two other schools in the federation as they had spare capacity, Years 9-13 remained in the safe buildings at Bramcote Hills.

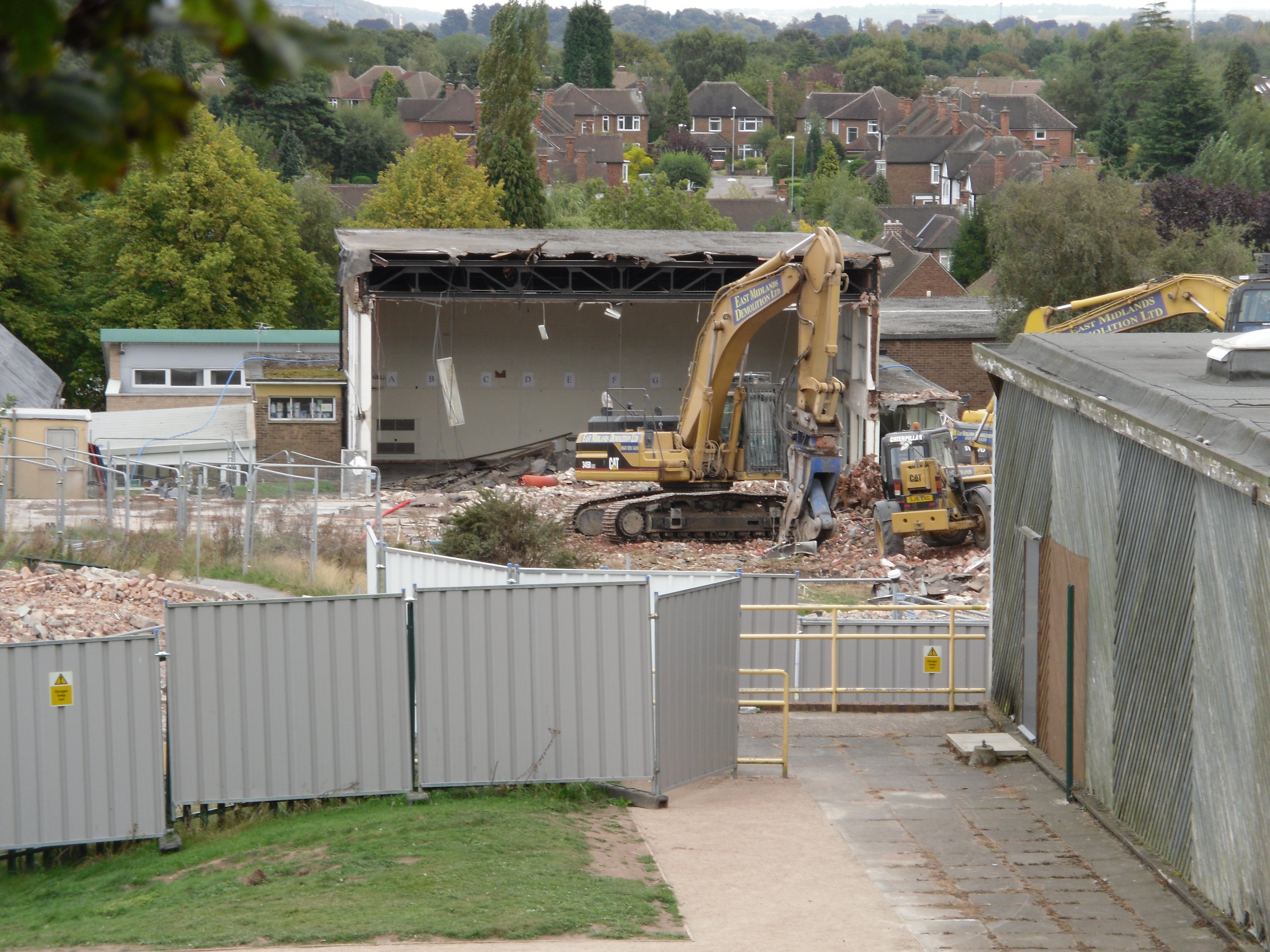
Demolition work on Upper school, view into the hall, and where tower block and kitchen and canteen, science block was to the left. To the right the Art and Music block remains, Art rooms now being used as the science rooms with additional portacabin class rooms

. Following a Nottinghamshire County Council Report on 14 May 2009 it was revealed there are further problems with the 'safe' buildings currently being used. The Design and Technology block was closed, as the building could not safely support the concrete roof. The work to rectify this problem was completed in the summer of 2009 by re-enforcing the windows with steel, and repairing foundations to reinstate the full block.

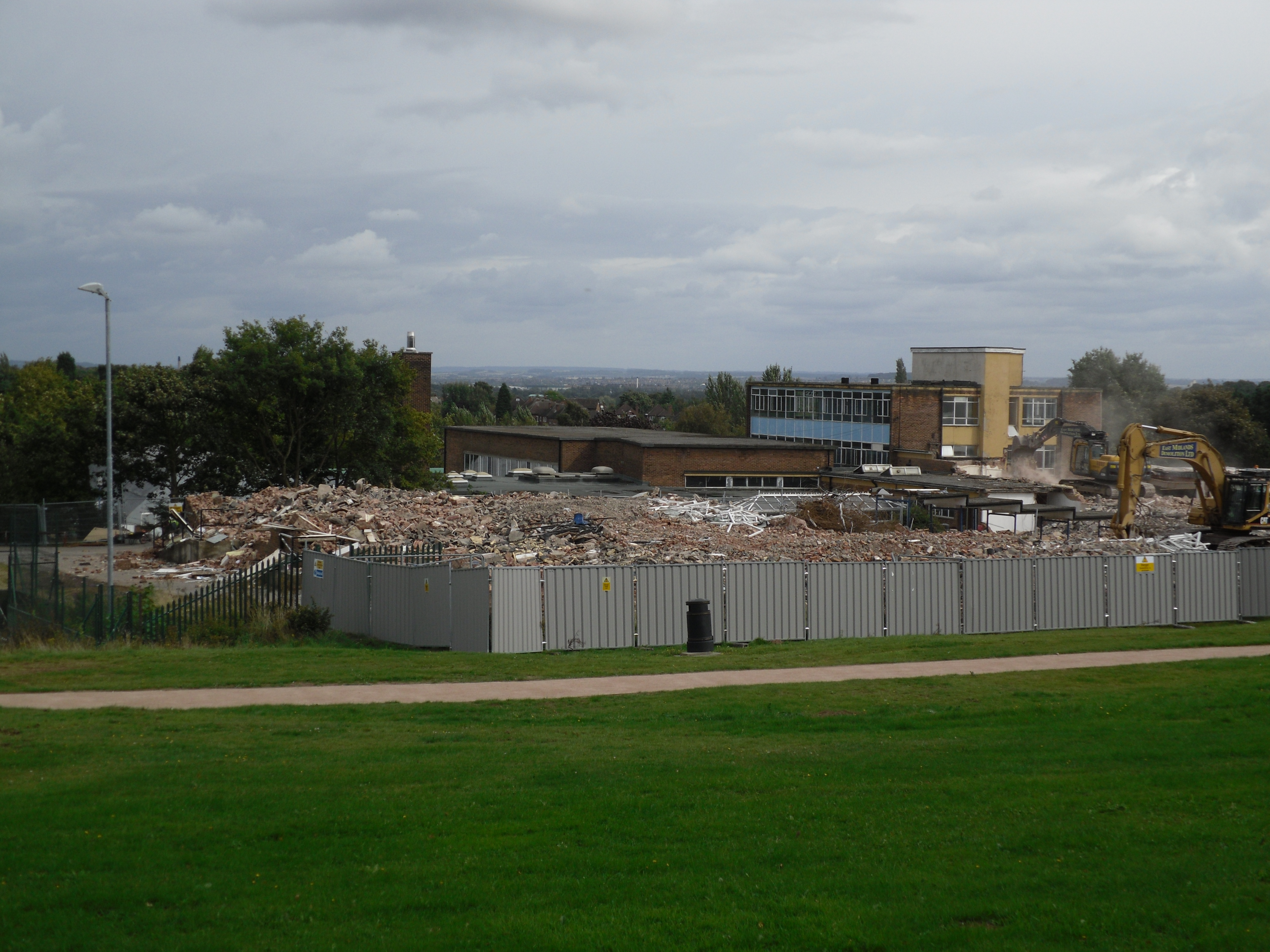
Remains of the Science Block, with tower block and hall still visible pre-demolition

In the Summer of 2009 demolition of the unsafe blocks in the upper school was completed, demolishing the science block, 3 storey tower block, and the 6th form block, leaving the gym, changing rooms, barn, and the art and music block, built by more recent construction. Prompt demolition was favoured to reduce the running costs of empty buildings.

== Closure ==
The unsafe buildings put the future of the School and site into media speculation. The school and federation and Nottinghamshire County Council opened a consultation on the closure of Bramcote Hills Sports and Community College, and for Alderman While School and Language College to take over the remaining 'safe' buildings on the site, creating a split site school. This created a 14-19 College on the site in the existing buildings.

Nottinghamshire County Council formally approved that the school close on 31 August 2009, with current students on role being transferred to Alderman White School and Language College.

== Future of the site ==
The site is now part of Alderman White School and Language College however the issues still remain current for the existing buildings. Alderman White under the White Hills Park Federation are continuing to run post 14 and post 16 provision from the site for the remaining federated schools, under the name of "Bramcote Hills College Sixth Form". Launching a glossy prospectus for the 2010 intake. However the sustainability of this 'new' venture cannot be seen as the remaining buildings on the site can only be used safely until 2014 / 2015, unless funding is found for new accommodation

Further investigations into the structural issues with the building have been ongoing. Extensive structural testing, only recently concluded in February 2009, determined that the buildings that have remained in use can remain so for the next three years. It is likely that they can be retained beyond that and probably for six years, subject to regular monitoring and inspection. This should result in the buildings being in use until the time that Building Schools for the Future (BSF) funding delivers a solution for this area. Beyond that time the future use of the buildings is currently unclear within the context of BSF. A master plan, identifying the educational needs and requirements of the area will be developed to clarify this at a later date. The current proposals may provide the flexibility to retain parts of the existing buildings, subject to the monitoring and testing regime outlined earlier

Under a Freedom of Information Act Request, copies of the structural surveys of all the buildings on the Bramcote Hills Site have been released and reveal faults have also been found in the floor and supporting structures of the Lower School along with the details on the failing roof beams on the Technology Block, and the possibility of failure due to the replacement of original metal framed windows with UPVC units.

A number of options have been considered to address the need for sufficient teaching accommodation as follows:

- Demolish all of the buildings and provide temporary accommodation
- Demolish all of the buildings and build new accommodation
- Repair and reinstate existing accommodation

An appraisal has been carried out to determine the cost of building a new 14-19 vocational facility on the site. This has been estimated at £13 million, which is far in excess of the estimated costs for repairing and reinstating existing accommodation. Repairing and reinstating the existing buildings is the option that will be least disruptive to students' education and provide sufficient teaching accommodation.

A Freedom of Information request from Nottinghamshire County Council request reveals the costs attributed to the building problems at the Bramcote Hills Site as at 10/2/2010 they are £1,752,642.71, which comprises survey costs, associated works from the survey of all buildings on the site £1,393,561.52 and demolition of the Upper School Block £317,368.65. The works from the surveys included works to the lower school, major works to the technology block – which are ongoing, temporary fencing and scaffolding, relocation of Drama, IT Science and forming access road to the Park School site. All equipment value retrieved from the upper school site was retained by the former Bramcote Hills School, ultimately returning to the Federations budget.

== Notable alumni ==
- Huw Swetnam, slalom canoer, won gold at the 2009 European Canoe Slalom Championships in Nottingham

=== Bramcote Hills Technical Grammar School ===
- Brian Bates, footballer with Notts County
- Geoffrey Kirk FREng FRAeS, Chief Design Engineer from 1994 to 2007 for Civil Aerospace, Rolls-Royce, and Chief Design Engineer from 1982 to 1985 of the RB211-535E4 and from 1985 to 1987 of the IAE V2500
- Pauline Latham (née Turner) OBE, Conservative MP since 2010 for Mid Derbyshire

=== Bramcote Hills Grammar School ===
- Andy Gill (journalist), music journalist and former Editor of NME
- Stephen Hammersley CBE, Chief Executive from 2004 to 2015 of UK Community Foundations
- Jeff Owen, former presenter on BBC Radio Nottingham
- Amanda Solloway née Edghill (also Bramcote Hills Technical Grammar School), Conservative MP from 2015 to 2017 and since 2019 for Derby North, Parliamentary Under-Secretary of State for Science, Research and Innovation since 2020.
- Adam Tedder, actor
- Julie Acred OBE, health service leader
- Elain Harwood, Hon.RIBA, architectural historian
