= George Spencer Academy =

Academy in Stapleford, Nottinghamshire, England

Location
- Arthur Mee Road; Stapleford, Nottinghamshire, NG9 7EW; England; 52°55′15″N 1°16′01″W

Information
- Type: Academy
- Motto: 'Learn Like a Pro'
- Established: 1960
- Department for Education URN: 136291 Tables
- Ofsted: Reports
- Principal: Helen Corbett
- Staff: ~150
- Gender: Mixed
- Age: 11 to 17
- Enrolment: 2500
- Colours: Red and Black
- Website: http://www.george-spencer.notts.sch.uk/

The George Spencer Academy (informally George Spencer; formerly George Spencer Foundation School and Technology College) is an English academy in Stapleford, Nottinghamshire encompassing both a secondary school and sixth form on the same campus. First opened in 1960, it was named after the headmaster of the Church Street Boys School from 1889 to 1927. The school specialises in design and technology with its sixth form being a Technology College established in 2004.

The school is situated in Stapleford near the Toton boundary. Able to be seen from Stapleford's Bardill's roundabout, it has a lower and upper site over the A52 and is consequently the only school in England to have a footbridge over an A-road. Students begin to educate at George Spencer at the age of eleven. The school has three feeder schools: Fairfield Primary School, Chetwynd Road Primary School and Bispham Drive Junior School, however children from other primary schools are able to apply.

At the end of Year 11 (aged 16), around half the students choose to stay on at the academy's sixth form for further education. Each year group is split into the P-half and S-half due to the school's large pupil intake to allow for easier lesson co-ordination. Students at George Spencer have a set of core values with "Strive to be the Best they can be" as one of them.

== History ==
School logo until April 2011

School logo from April 2011 – Late 2019

=== 1960–1980s ===
George Spencer Academy was established in 1960 as George Spencer Comprehensive School, and originally consisted of just its upper site (Stapleford side); the academy expanded afterwards to include its lower site in 1978.

=== 1990s–2000s ===
From the 1990s, the academy had around 900 boys and girls. A ballot of parents, in 1993, resulted in it becoming grant-maintained. It had since become a foundation school, awarded the Beacon School status. In 1994, the academy acquired the Technology College specialisation; it was thus simply known as George Spencer Foundation School and Technology College, and was also a Leading Edge school; its sixth form Technology College opened in 2004.

In 2006, the Office of the Schools Adjudicator published a decision on an objection to the admission arrangements of the academy. The adjudicator, Alan Parker, upheld the objection. He stated that the use of the first preference first criteria could militate against the free expression of parental choice in some cases and offered no advantages that would outweigh this potential disadvantage. In respect of the application for partial selection he also concluded that for a number of years the academy had been using a process that does not constitute selection according to aptitude which was neither fair nor consistent.

=== 2010–2018 ===
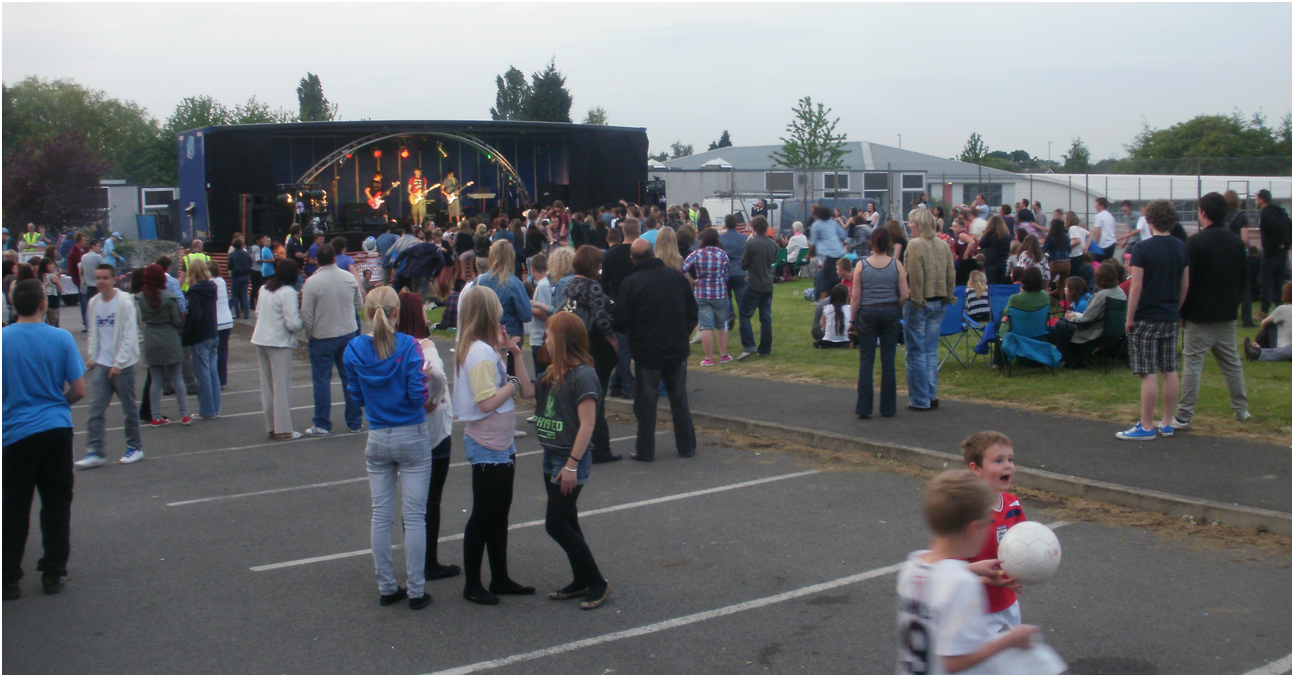
The Big Friday Night, George Spencer's 2011 prom fundraiser, 6 May 2011

George Spencer's fiftieth birthday was scheduled to come in 2010, and it came there–the milestone was marked by turning the grey globe on the logo gold with a "50"."60s Day" took place on 19 November 2010 and an aerial photo of everyone associated with the school arranged in a "50" was due to take place on the main playing field on 24 March 2011 but was later cancelled. On 17 August 2010, following consideration of all the consultation feedback, the governing body of George Spencer Foundation School took the decision to continue the conversion to Academy status. After approval from the Secretary of State Michael Gove, the school successfully converted with effect from 1 September 2010, and was in the first wave of converted schools.

On 21 October 2010, George Spencer's hall was used as a venue for a question-and-answer session on government spending cuts, which saw prime ministers David Cameron and Nick Clegg (a deputy prime minister) visiting the school in the afternoon. Also, ITV broadcast live from the hall for their breakfast television programme Daybreak on 25 August 2011, showing several students opening their GCSE results.

To raise money for the 2011 Year 11 prom, students organised the academy's first music festival–The Big Friday Night–which was held on 6 May from 6:30 pm. Singers and bands from the school performed on a portable stage on the school field. As a result of its success, the event returned on 30 March 2012.

In 2019, the new principal Helen Corbett was appointed. She has been kept principal since 2019.

=== 2018–onwards ===
In November 2019, Boris Johnson visited the school to try out Pottery in the school's art class.

Rushcliffe School joined the Spencer Academies Trust (previously the Trent Academies Group) in September 2018. The school officially became an academy in August 2012 and was later renamed Rushcliffe Spencer Academy in August 2021 to align with the trust's brand.

== Academic performance and achievements ==
Known for its reputatable GCSE and A-Level results, the academy received the second-best set of GCSE results from the Nottinghamshire LEA, tied with Rushcliffe School and behind Southwell Minster School. In 2010, Ofsted graded George Spencer "outstanding", the school having passed all 27 of the criteria. This grade was maintained in 2015. The sixth form was awarded a good alongside the outstanding grade of the academy in 2015."Ofsted Report 2015". As of 2023 the school was regraded by Ofsted as "good" with the sixth form being graded "outstanding" "Ofsted Report 2023".

=== National Teaching Awards ===
Chris Haggett, the academy's director of activities, enterprise, and enrichment, was presented with the teaching award for enterprise in the East Midlands. Haggett, who was then nominated in the same category at the National Teaching Awards, did not attain the prize.

== Notable former pupils ==
- Nigel McCrery — screenwriter
