= Chilwell Olympia =

Sports facility in Chilwell, Nottinghamshire, England

Coordinates: 52°54′48″N 1°13′54″W

Chilwell Olympia is a sports centre in Chilwell, near Nottingham. It is run by Broxtowe Borough Council with the aim of meeting the recreational and sporting needs of the locality as well as the physical education needs of the pupils at Chilwell School. The centre was opened in April 1974 and is the base for a large number of clubs and local sporting activities.

Chilwell Olympia is also home to the Nottinghamshire Badminton Association.

== Facilities ==
Indoor activities available include aerobics, badminton, basketball, cricket, fencing, karate, netball, short tennis, squash, table tennis, trampolining, and volleyball.

Outside activities include skateboarding and BMX riding, cricket, football, hockey, and orienteering. The site has small all-weather facilities for skating including a jump box, quarter pipe and half pipe.

There is also a large modern gym attached to the centre, called the Silhouettes Fitness Suite. The gym was refurbished in 2004 and new equipment was added.

The centre is also used for events such as antique fairs, computer fairs, function hire, and car boot sales.

The centre's sports facilities have been assessed as "good".
