= Church of St Michael and All Angels, Bramcote =

Church in Nottinghamshire, England

Coordinates: 52°56′06″N 01°14′46″W

St Michael and All Angels, Bramcote
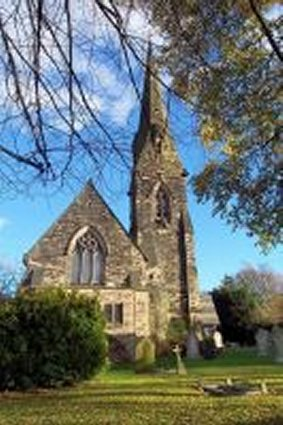
- St Michael and All Angels, Bramcote
- Denomination: Church of England
- Churchmanship: Open Evangelical
- Website: saintmichaelsbramcote.com

History
- Dedication: St Michael and All Angels

Administration
- Diocese: Diocese of Southwell and Nottingham
- Archdeaconry: Nottingham Archdeaconry
- Deanery: Nottingham South Deanery
- Parish: Bramcote

Clergy
- Vicar: Revd Matt Roberts

The Church of St Michael and All Angels, Bramcote is an Anglican parish church in Bramcote, Broxtowe, Nottinghamshire, England.

== History and description ==
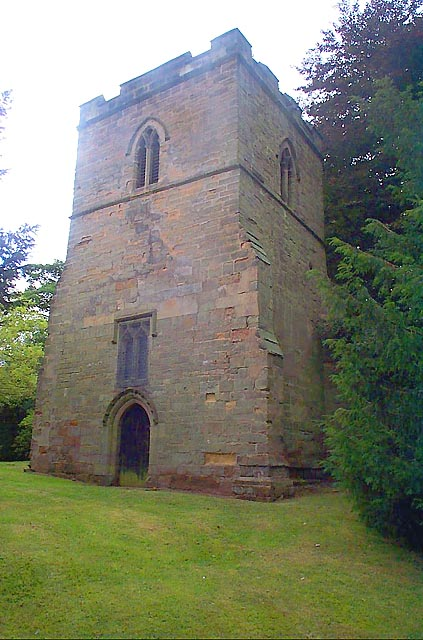
The remains of the old church tower

St Michael and All Angels Parish Church, Bramcote was opened on 12 December 1861, replacing the previous Parish Church of Bramcote, the tower of which still remains.

The new church was designed by the architect John Johnson.

The spire of the church is 130 feet high and underwent major repairs in 2011 – the church's 150th anniversary year. The 13th-century font from the old church was transferred to the new one in 1861.

The church is Grade II listed by the Department for Digital, Culture, Media and Sport as a building of special architectural or historic interest.

== See also ==
- Listed buildings in Bramcote

== Sources ==
- The Buildings of England, Nottinghamshire, 1951. Nikolaus Pevsner
