= Patricia Randall Tindale =

English architect and civil servant (1926–2011)

Patricia Tindale
- Born: Patricia Randall Tindale; 11 March 1926; Chipping Barnet, Hertfordshire, England
- Died: 13 May 2011 (aged 85); Clapham, London, England
- Education: Architectural Association School of Architecture
- Occupations: Architect; Civil servant
- Years active: 1949–1986

Patricia Randall Tindale (11 March 1926 – 13 May 2011) was an English architect and civil servant. She joined the Civil Service at the Ministry of Education in 1949, and moved to its development group to develop prototypes for school buildings. Tindale moved to the Ministry of Housing and Local Government in 1960 and was a founder member of its housing research & development group the following year. She joined the merged Department of the Environment's Housing Development Directorate in 1970 before leaving the research sector to lead the Building Regulations Professional Division in 1972. Between 1982 and 1986 she served as the Department of the Environment's chief architect and then retired from the Civil Service. The Royal Society of Arts established a lecture series and an award and named a meeting room in her honour.

== Biography ==
=== Early life ===
Tindale was born at 9 Hill View, Bell's Hill, Chipping Barnet, Hertfordshire on 11 March 1926. She was the only child of the Inland Revenue tax officer Thomas John Tindale and his wife Princess May, née Uttin. At the registration of her birth, Tindale's name was not recorded but her naming certificate had her name as Sheila Randall Patricia. She was taught at Blatchington Court School in Seaford, East Sussex, and then the Architectural Association School of Architecture from 1943 to 1948.

=== Career ===
In 1949 Tindale joined the Civil Service in the Ministry of Education. She worked in the ministry's architects and building branch for vetting schools being built in Wales and was the first territorial appointment of her former Hertfordshire boss Stirrat Johnson-Marshall. In 1951 Tindale moved to the ministry's development group to develop prototypes for the new generation of spacious school buildings for quick reconfiguration site wide by sliding partitions. Such schools she designed included the Parks School, Belper with the use of the Brockhouse system, the Arnold Grammar School, Nottinghamshire, and the Finmere Primary School with David Medd and Mary Medd. Considered one of the Civil Service's rising employees, Tindale transferred to the Ministry of Housing and Local Government in 1960, and was a founding member of its housing research & development group a year later.

She was instrumental in bringing about the introduction of an alternative smaller-scale prefabricated building systems after her group advised against the government putting families into tower blocks. Tindale was heavily involved in the 5M programme adopting the building system Consortium of Local Authorities Special Programme (CLASP) for residential housing rather than the college and school buildings in Nottinghamshire. For most of 1964 she went to the United States on a scholarship from the Royal Institute of British Architects (RIBA) to study prefabricated timber housing. Tindale's 1967 report Housebuilding in the USA inspired the imperative to move forward alternatives to sub-standard residential tower blocks following the 1968 Ronan Point gas explosion disaster that killed four people.

After the Department of Transport and the Ministry of Housing and Local Government were merged to become the Department of the Environment in 1970, she joined its Housing Development Directorate. In 1972 Tindale left the research sector to lead the Building Regulations Professional Division. As a consequence of her work, the government adopted the CLASP building system for residential housing, with 250,000 homes built by this method by 1975. Tindale oversaw the construction of Wokingham's Gorse Ride South estate in Finchampstead, a first of its kind inspired by research into 100% timber framed and clad properties, and Bethnal Green's Granby Street, which were published by her department.

In 1982 she was appointed the Department of the Environment's chief architect, a position created by Michael Heseltine after lobbying from the RIBA. During her time in the post, Tindale steadied the decline in public housing construction and affected government policy on design after a controversial competition for the National Gallery. This was the final time an architect in the civil service was influential in architectural education and design and built a team of architect advisers. In 1986 she retired from the civil service, and her position was abolished as government interest in building and the influence of public service architects declined. In retirement Tindale continued to promote architecture through the RIBA committees, and chaired the Housing Design Awards from 1984 to 1993. She served on the Building Regulations Advisory Committee and the board of the Anchor Housing Association. Tindale was active in the Reform Club and the Weavers Guild.

== Personal life ==
She had a massive stroke in 1997 and spent the next 14 years in the Clapham nursing home Minnie Kidd House, where she died of ischemic colitis on 13 May 2011. Tindale was unmarried; she worked at the Civil Service at a time when married women were expected to leave it.

== Legacy ==
Noel Wurr, a fellow architect, described Tindale as "a great administrator but she was also very into the artistic side of architecture", and David Birkbeck, the director of Design for Homes, said of her "she’s the last time that an architect had such an influential position in the civil service" when the government was serious about concept design.

As a 20-year fellow of the Royal Society of Arts (RSA), the organisation established the Tindale lecture series in her honour and created the Tindale room for Fellows at the House. The RSA also founded the Patricia Tindale Legacy Award which "challenges students to design an element of the built environment that can be easily reconfigured to meet different functional requirements, helping to eliminate construction waste."
