= Platelets (journal) =

- Discipline: Hematology
- Language: English
- Edited by: Steve Watson, Paul Harrison

Publication details
- History: 1990-present
- Publisher: Taylor & Francis
- Frequency: 8/year
- Impact factor: 3.213 (2015)

Standard abbreviations
- ISO 4: Platelets

Indexing
- CODEN: PLTEEF
- ISSN: 0953-7104 (print); 1369-1635 (web)
- OCLC no.: 796198163

Links
- Journal homepage; Online access; Online archive

Platelets is a peer-reviewed medical journal covering all aspects of platelet-related research. The editors-in-chief are Elizabeth Gardiner (Australian National University) and William A.E. Parker (University of Sheffield). It was established in 1990 and is published by Taylor & Francis.
