= Alderman White School =

Location
- Chilwell Lane, Bramcote; Nottingham, Nottinghamshire, NG9 3DU; England; 52°56′32″N 1°14′51″W

Information
- Type: Academy
- Department for Education URN: 138832 Tables
- Ofsted: Reports
- Head teacher: A Mellors
- Gender: co-educational
- Age: 11 to 16
- Enrolment: 860
- Houses: Newark, Sherwood, Trent and Welbeck
- Colours: Black, White & Blue
- Website: https://www.aldermanwhite.school

Alderman White School is a mixed, 11-18 secondary school in Bramcote, Nottinghamshire. The school is a member of The White Hills Park Federation Trust and became an academy on 1 October 2012, rebranding from Alderman White School & Language College to Alderman White School. The school specialises in languages, and runs many language classes on a pay-as-you-go basis which are offered to both students and the wider community.

Bramcote Hills Sport & Community College was formally closed by Nottinghamshire County Council on 31 August 2009. The council agreed on 1 September 2009 to enlarge Alderman White School by incorporating the remaining site of Bramcote Hills School, following demolition of the unsafe upper school. Thus making Alderman White a split site school and increasing the number on the roll.

== Site ==
Following the formal closure of Bramcote Hills, the school now operates from two sites: its original site on Chilwell Lane, and the former Bramcote Hills Site on Moor Lane, which neighbours The Bramcote School, also part of The White Hills Park Federation Trust.

The former Bramcote Hills site has a large playing field to the north of the site which bordered Coventry Lane, accessed by Moor Lane via foot. It also has to the south of the site a large running track and football pitches which are shared with the neighbouring federated school, Bramcote College

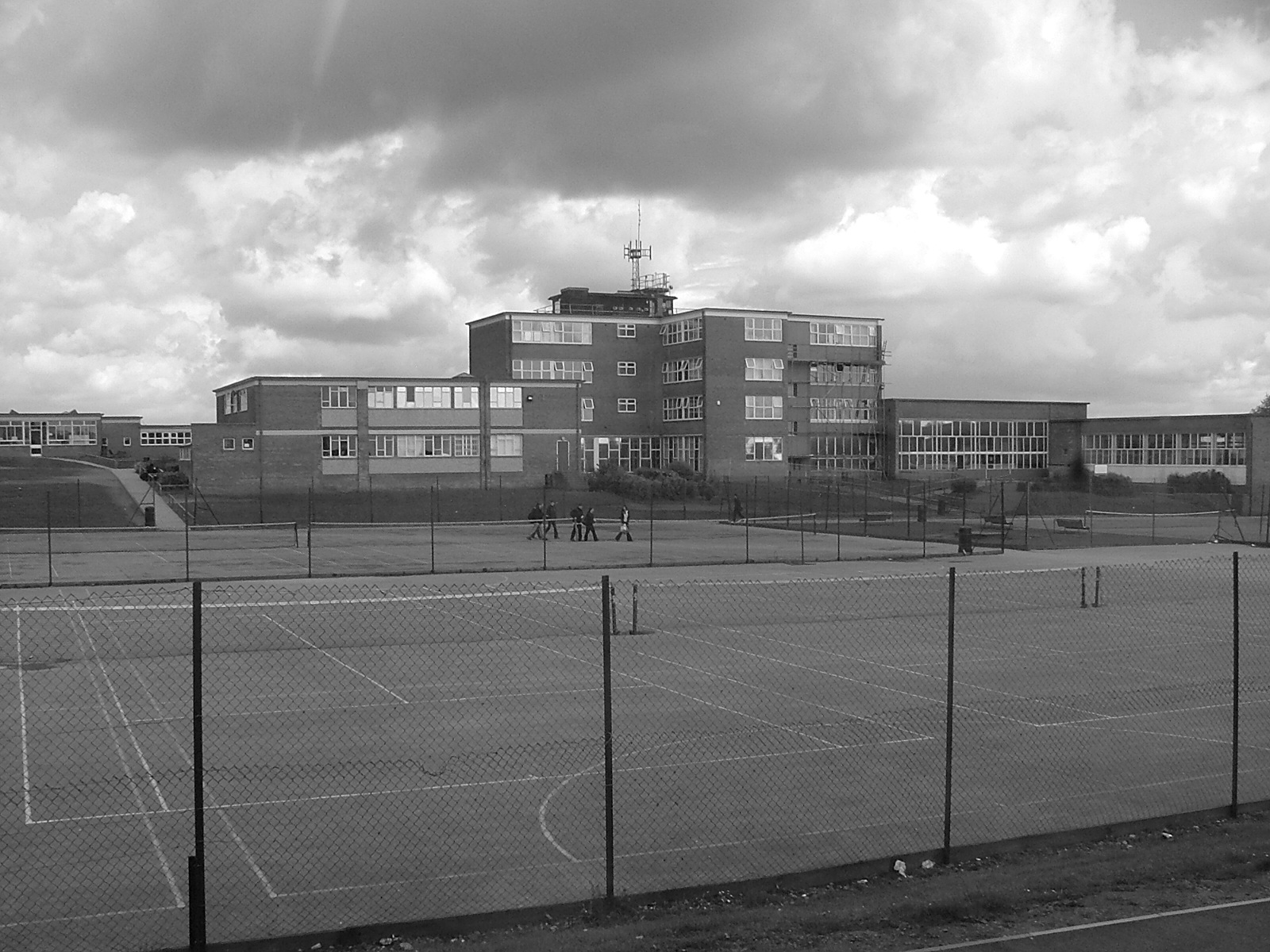
Moor Lane Site, Formally Bramcote Hills School

== Bramcote College Sixth Form ==
Bramcote College Sixth Form Logo.

Alderman White under the White Hills Park Federation is running post-14 and post-16 provision from the former Bramcote Hills Sport & Community College site for the federated schools, under the name of "Bramcote College Sixth Form" .

In 2009, a glossy prospectus was launched for the 2010 intake with new branding seen in the logo. The abbreviation shown in the logo for Bramcote Hills College Sixth Form reads BC6F, reflecting the title of Bramcote College Sixth Form by which the staff, parents and local community have known the college for many years. The Federation chose the accompanying text of Bramcote Hills College Sixth Form to maintain the Bramcote Hills identity of the site. This was not an oversight in the rebranding process as has been suggested. The college has since been rebranded, dropping the word hills from its name.

There are no questions regarding the sustainability of the provision provided at the Bramcote Hills site, with remedial work now completed the remaining buildings can be used for the foreseeable future.

== Notable alumni ==
- Richard Beckinsale
- Alice Levine, a former head girl.
- Gary Birtles, twice European cup-winning footballer with Nottingham Forest
