= The White Hills Park Federation Trust =

The White Hills Park Trust

Location
- Moor Lane, Beeston; Nottingham, Nottinghamshire, NG9 3GA; England
- Coordinates: 52°56′32″N 1°14′51″W

Information
- Type: Multi Academy Trust
- Motto: A Culture of Excellence
- Established: 2006
- Local authority: Nottinghamshire
- Specialist: Business & Enterprise, Sports, Languages
- CEO: Paul Heery
- Gender: co-educational
- Age: 3 to 19
- Enrolment: 1400
- Website: https://www.whptrust.org/

The White Hills Park Trust, is a collective group of academies in Nottinghamshire, England. The name is derived from the three schools originally within the White Hills Park Federation. The Federation was founded in 2006 after recruiting a 'super head', for the three schools which at the time none of which had a headteachers. Kevin Dean was recruited from Eastwood Comprehensive School, to become the Federation Executive Head Teacher.

On 1 October 2012 the White Hills Park Federation became The White Hills Park Federation Trust, a multi-academy trust, and since then has become known simply as The White Hills Park Trust.

== Schools in the Trust ==
- Alderman White School
- Bramcote College
- The Florence Nightingale Academy

Former Federated School

Bramcote Hills Sport & Community College was in the federation from its conception, however following its legal closure in August 2009, due to building safety problems, the remaining site is now under the legal control of Alderman White School & Language College.

Bramcote Hills Sports and Community College was formally closed by Nottinghamshire County Council on 31 August 2009. At the same time the council agreed from 1 September 2009, to enlarge Alderman White School and Language College, to incorporate the remaining site of Bramcote Hills School, following demolition of the unsafe upper school, this making Alderman White a split site school, and keeping the buildings in use within the federation

== Former Bramcote Hills Site ==
The two schools now share one 6th Form facility based at the former Bramcote Hills Sport & Community College Site, called Bramcote College, now under the Alderman White School management.

Investigations into the structural issues with the former Bramcote Hills site buildings, now in use by Alderman White School have been ongoing. Extensive structural testing, concluded in February 2009, determined that the buildings that have remained in use, by the former school, can remain in use for the next three years. It is likely that they can be retained beyond that and probably for six years, subject to regular monitoring and inspection. This should result in the buildings being in use until the time that Building Schools for the Future (BSF) funding delivers a solution for this area. Beyond that time the future use of the buildings is currently unclear within the context of BSF. A master plan, identifying the educational needs and requirements of the area will be developed to clarify this at a later date. The current proposals may provide the flexibility to retain parts of the existing buildings, subject to the monitoring and testing regime

An appraisal has been carried out to determine the cost of building a new 14-19 vocational facility on the former Bramcote Hills site. This has been estimated at £13million, which is far in excess of the estimated costs for repairing and reinstating existing accommodation. Repairing and reinstating the existing buildings is the option that will be least disruptive to students' education and provide sufficient teaching accommodation.

The costs attributed to the building problems at the Bramcote Hills site as of 10/2/2009 are £1,752,642.71, which comprises Survey Costs, Associated works from the survey to all buildings on the site £1,393,561.52 and Demolition of the Upper School Block £317,368.65. The workes from the surveys included works to the lower school, major works to the technology block, which are ongoing, temporary fencing and scaffolding, relocation of Drama, IT Science and forming access road to the Park School site. All equipment value retrieved from the upper school site was retained by the former Bramcote Hills School.

Under a Freedom of Information Act Request, copies of the structural surveys of all the buildings on the Bramcote Hills Site have been released and reveal faults have also been found in the floor and supporting structures of the Lower School along with the details on the failing roof beams on the Technology Block, and the possibility of failure due to the replacement of original metal framed windows with UPVC units.
