= Bramcote College =

The Bramcote School

Location
- Bramcote; Nottingham, Nottinghamshire, NG9 3GA; England
- Coordinates: 52°56′22″N 1°15′04″W

Information
- Type: Academy
- Motto: Work hard Be well Do well
- Established: C1948
- Closed: July 2017
- Headteacher: Mo Oliver
- Gender: co-educational
- Age: 11 to 16
- Enrolment: 597
- Houses: Trent, Newark, Sherwood & Welbeck
- Colours: Blue, White & Red
- Website: http://bramcote.college

The Bramcote School was a co-educational secondary school located in Bramcote, Nottinghamshire, England. It was a member of The White Hills Park Federation Trust. The school serves students from ages 11 to 18 and has a student body of over 1,200 pupils.

== History ==
=== Secondary modern school ===
This was the first school to be built on the Bramcote Hills Site. In 1948 it opened as a Secondary Modern boys school named Bramcote Hills Boys School.

=== Comprehensive ===
It later became a comprehensive school titled The Park Comprehensive.

At 5am on Monday 17 October 1994, a white Vauxhall Astra, with false number plates, rammed into the building, causing £1.4m of fire damage. Two 15 year old boys from Stapleford were charged.

Bramcote Park Comprehensive School became a Business and Enterprise school in 2004. After receiving business status, it re-branded its image by announced a new logo and identity, consisting of red, white and blue.

In 2007 the school became part of a three-piece federation, named The White Hills Park Federation Trust under one executive headteacher. The School was federated with neighbouring Bramcote Hills Sport & Community College and nearby Alderman White School. After the complete closure of Bramcote Hills School in 2011, the school adopted their status as a specialist Sports College.

On 1 October 2012 the school converted to academy status, and rebranded from Bramcote Park Sports, Business & Enterprise School to 'The Bramcote School'. In the summer of 2017, the school closed its old site and moved into buildings shared with Bramcote College Sixth Form, and began operating and branding under the name 'Bramcote College'.

On 16 September 2021, a fire broke out within the old school building; investigations into the cause of the fire are unknown. The buildings were demolished in August 2022. The site will know house a secondary school for the neighbouring Foxwood Academy.

== Campus ==
It was located to the south of Bramcote Woods, and to the east of Bramcote Park recreational and open grounds. It was part of a larger campus of schools build around the 1950s, which include Foxwood Academy, and the former Bramcote Hills Sport & Community College now a sixth form centre and part of Alderman White School.

Access to the school was from the eastbound A52 to Nottingham and shared a drive with Bramcote Leisure Centre and Foxwood Academy. There is also a restricted vehicular and pedestrian access to the site of the former Bramcote Hills Sport & Community College following the creation of the federation, to enable staff and student movements between the schools.
