= Bramcote =

Suburban village in Nottinghamshire, England

Coordinates: 52.934°N 1.242°W

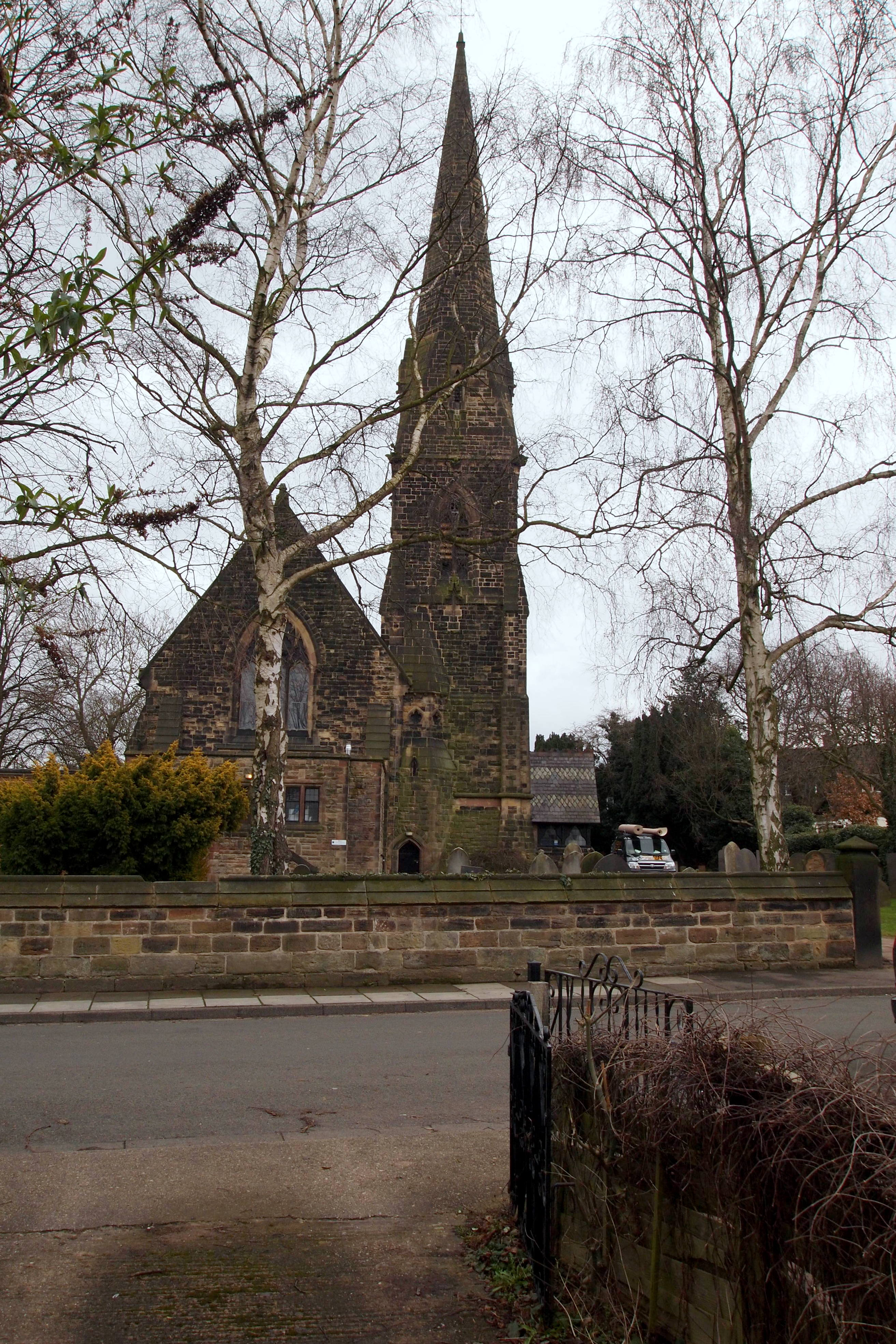

- Location within Nottinghamshire
- Population: 7,270 (Ward. 2011)
- OS grid reference: SK 50941 37703
- District: Borough of Broxtowe
- Shire county: Nottinghamshire
- Region: East Midlands
- Country: England
- Sovereign state: United Kingdom
- Post town: NOTTINGHAM
- Postcode district: NG9
- Dialling code: 0115
- Police: Nottinghamshire
- Fire: Nottinghamshire
- Ambulance: East Midlands
- UK Parliament: Broxtowe

Bramcote (/ˈbræmkoʊt/, locally /ˈbræmkət/) is a suburban village and former civil parish in the Broxtowe district of Nottinghamshire, England, between Stapleford and Beeston. It is in the parliamentary constituency of Broxtowe. The main Nottingham–Derby road today is the A52, Brian Clough Way. Nearby are Beeston, Wollaton, Chilwell and Stapleford. One of the main roads between Nottingham and Derby used to pass through the village centre, entering a cutting that formed a blind bend. A country house to the north of the village became publicly owned and was demolished in 1968. Its grounds became a public area of park and hillside, now known as Bramcote Hills Park.

== Demography ==
The population of Bramcote is 9,270 with a household average of 2.3. The Broxtowe Ward population measured at the Census 2011 showed a population of 7,270.

The proportion of residents identifying as White British is 82.7 per cent, with 17.3 per cent originating from 41 other countries, notably India, Pakistan, Bangladesh, Sri Lanka, China, Jamaica, Barbados, Poland, Italy, the Netherlands, Greece, Russia and Australia. In religion, 60.7 per cent of Bramcote people see themselves as Christian, 3.6 per cent as Muslim, 2.8 per cent as Hindu and 2.5 per cent as Sikhs, while 22.6 per cent adhere to no religion.

== Schools ==
There are four local schools:

- Bramcote C of E (Aided) Primary School
- Bramcote Hills Primary School
- Bramcote College
- Foxwood Academy

St John's College, Nottingham, which closed in 2019, was a Church of England theological college situated on the southern edge of Bramcote.

A second comprehensive school, Bramcote Hills Sport & Community College, was found unsafe and demolished. Its pupil were moved to the nearby Bramcote Park and Alderman White schools. The building was replaced by Bramcote Hills College Sixth Form. In 2009, this, Bramcote Park Sports, Business & Enterprise School and Alderman White School joined to form White Hills Park Federation of Schools. Year 10 and 11 students can travel between the sites in a school minibus.

== Leisure centre ==
Bramcote Leisure Centre in Bramcote Park, off the A52, has a pool with a water slide divided into a 25-metre pool and family splash pool, a teaching pool, a gym, a junior gym, a five-a-side pitch with a local team, the Bramcote Beers, a health suite and a crèche. It gained Quest Accreditation in March 2008 and the Aquamark ASA National Award Scheme for swimming programme quality, in November 2008. The Vitality fitness suite has recently had a £250,000 renovation, refurbishment and extension. The poolside changing rooms have also been updated.

== Bus routes ==
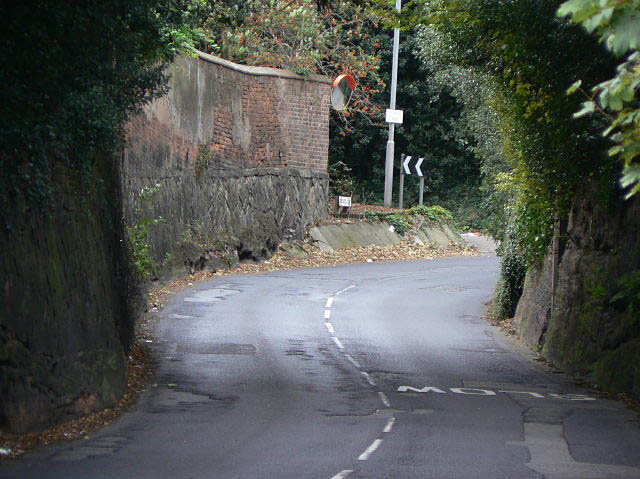
Rock cutting, Chilwell Lane, Bramcote

Nottingham City Transport

- 30: Nottingham – Ilkeston Road – Jubilee Campus – Wollaton Park – Bramcote – Wollaton Vale

Trentbarton

- i4: Nottingham – Stapleford – Sandiacre – Derby
- 21: Nottingham – Kirk Hallam – Ilkeston
- 18: Nottingham – Beeston – Stapleford
- 20: Nottingham – Rylands – Beeston – Stapleford – Ilkeston – Heanor

Nottingham Community Transport

- L10: Wollaton – Bramcote – Beeston

== Historical landmarks ==
- Frances Longden Almshouses, Cow Lane
- Of Bramcote Hall in Bramcote Park, the bottom few layers of brick remain.
- Bramcote Manor House dates back to the Elizabethan period.
- Bramcote Memorial Hall in Church Street commemorates victims of the First World War.

== Churches ==
The Church of St Michael and All Angels, Bramcote, in Church Street, has three Sunday services and runs spiritual and social activities for all ages. Built in 1861, it marked its 150th anniversary year in 2011. The churchyard contains war graves of three World War I soldiers and one from World War II. Only the churchyard and tower remain of a previous Anglican church off Town Street, known locally known as the Sunken Church.

Bramcote Methodist Church in Chapel Street has a Sunday morning service and an evening Communion service once a month.

Emmanuel Church, an independent Evangelical church, meets on Sunday mornings at Bramcote College. It runs a programme for youth and children, a men's breakfast group, prayer groups and house groups.

== Parks and open spaces ==
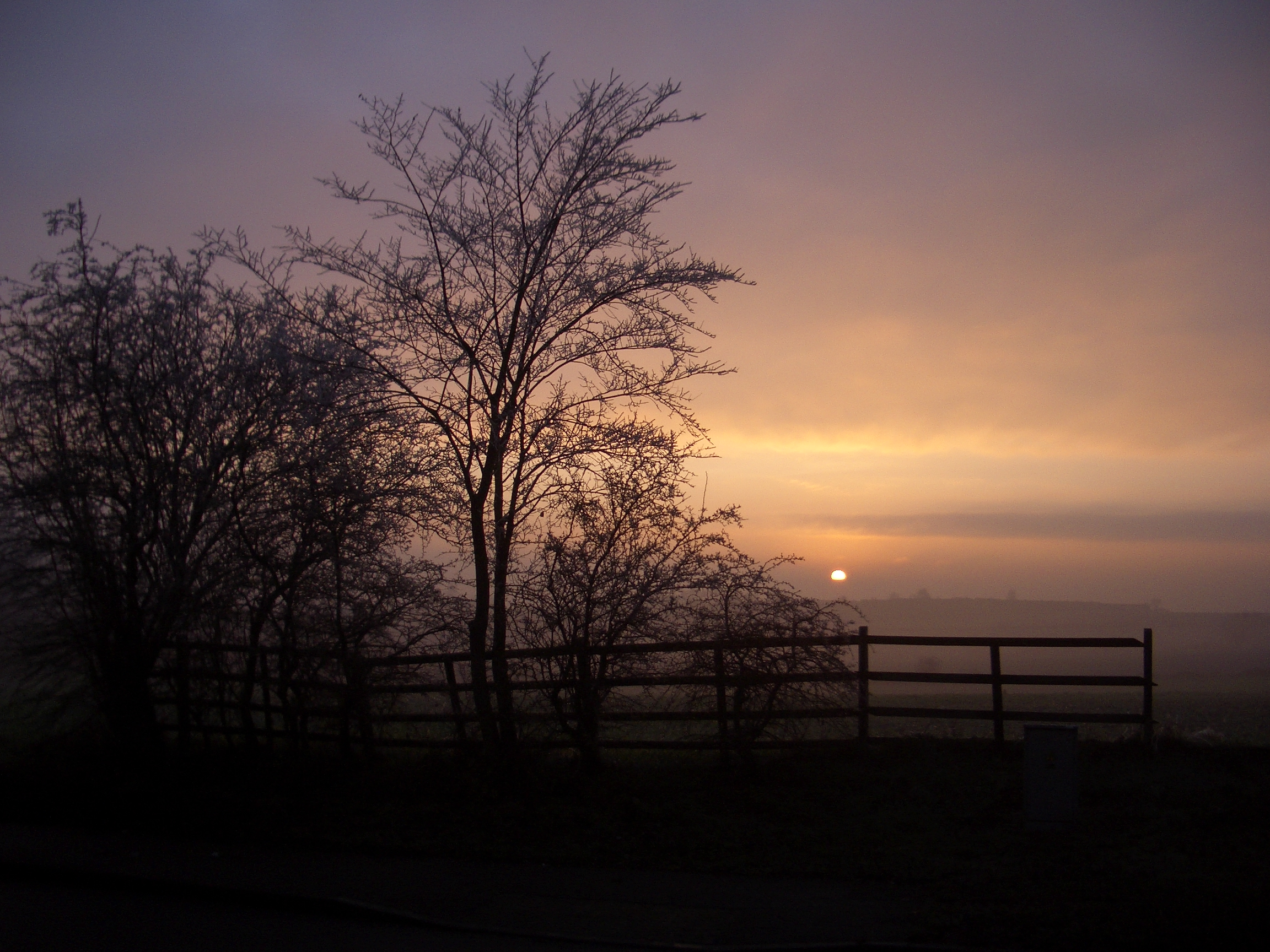
Sunset over Bramcote from just below Devils Bend

Bramcote Park is the biggest of the parks in Bramcote. Its wooded area stretches from Bramcote Park School towards Stapleford, Wollaton and the former landfill site. It is one of the few sites in the Nottingham area with a Green Flag Award. It features an extensive children's playground, car park and easy-access paths.

King George's Park offers views across Bramcote from a steeply sloping site with a network of surfaced paths linked to adjacent countryside. There are two free tennis courts, a children's playground and several parking areas.

Bramcote Ridge Open Space of about 12 hectares (29 acres) consists of a mosaic of acid grassland, naturally regenerating scrub and mature woodland managed as a nature reserve. It is a designated Grade II Site Important for Nature Conservation, and a listed Area of Restricted Development. It is surrounded on three sides by residential development, in which there is roadside parking.

== Civil parish ==
In 1931 the parish had a population of 987. On 1 April 1935 the parish was abolished and merged to form Beeston and Stapleford.

== See also ==
- Listed buildings in Bramcote
- Bramcote Hills
- Bramcote College
