= William McIntyre (English cricketer) =

English cricketer

Personal information
- Born: 24 May 1844; Eastwood, Nottinghamshire, England
- Died: 13 September 1892 (aged 48); Prestwich, Lancashire, England
- Batting: Right-handed
- Bowling: Right-arm fast
- Relatives: Michael McIntyre (brother); Martin McIntyre (brother)

Domestic team information
- Years: Team
- 1869–1871: Nottinghamshire
- 1872-1880: Lancashire
- FC debut: 17 May 1869 All England Eleven v United England Eleven
- Last FC: 22 July 1880 Lancashire v Gloucestershire

Career statistics
Competition	First-class
Matches	97
Runs scored	1,323
Batting average	10.41
100s/50s	0/4
Top score	99
Balls bowled	18,573
Wickets	510
Bowling average	12.61
5 wickets in innings	53
10 wickets in match	14
Best bowling	8/31
Catches/stumpings	69/–
- Source: CricketArchive, February 2011

William McIntyre (24 May 1844 – 13 September 1892) was an English cricketer who played first-class cricket for Nottinghamshire from 1869 to 1871 and for Lancashire from 1872 to 1880.

McIntyre was born at Eastwood, Nottinghamshire and is first recorded as playing for Eastwood in 1866. In 1867, he began as a professional with the Nottingham Commercial Club at Trent Bridge and also started playing for the All England Eleven. A match for All England against the United England Eleven in 1869 marked his first-class debut. Also in 1869 he started playing for Nottinghamshire and achieved his career highest score of 99 in his second match of the season against Kent. In 1870 he took 3 five-wicket innings and took ten wickets in one match. Also in 1870 he took up a post with Bolton Cricket Club. His form for Nottinghamshire dropped in the 1871 season and in 1872, with residency established, he started playing for Lancashire. In the first six seasons he took 40 five wicket innings and had 12 ten-wicket matches. He was a nemesis to newly formed Derbyshire, who gave him 14 five wicket innings, and he achieved his best performance of 8 for 31 against Derbyshire in 1877. He left the Bolton Club at the end of the 1877 season and a benefit match was held for him on 14 September between A.N.Hornby's XI and Sixteen of Bolton. His next position was with Castleton Club at Rochdale. His form declined in 1878 and 1879 and he played his last season for Lancashire in 1880.

McIntyre was a right-arm fast bowler and took 510 first-class wickets at an average of 12.61 and a best performance of 8 for 31. He was a right-handed batsman and played 151 innings in 97 first-class matches with an average of 10.41 and a top score of 99. His benefit season of 1881 at Lancashire raised £1,000.

McIntyre remained with Castleton Club until 1882 and then umpired three matches for Cambridge University in 1882 and 1883.

McIntyre died at the asylum at Prestwich, Lancashire at the age of 48 and was buried in Bolton Cemetery. His brothers Michael McIntyre and Martin McIntyre also played for Nottinghamshire.
