= Beauvale =

Village in Nottinghamshire, England

Coordinates: 53.036609°N 1.267218°W

- Village
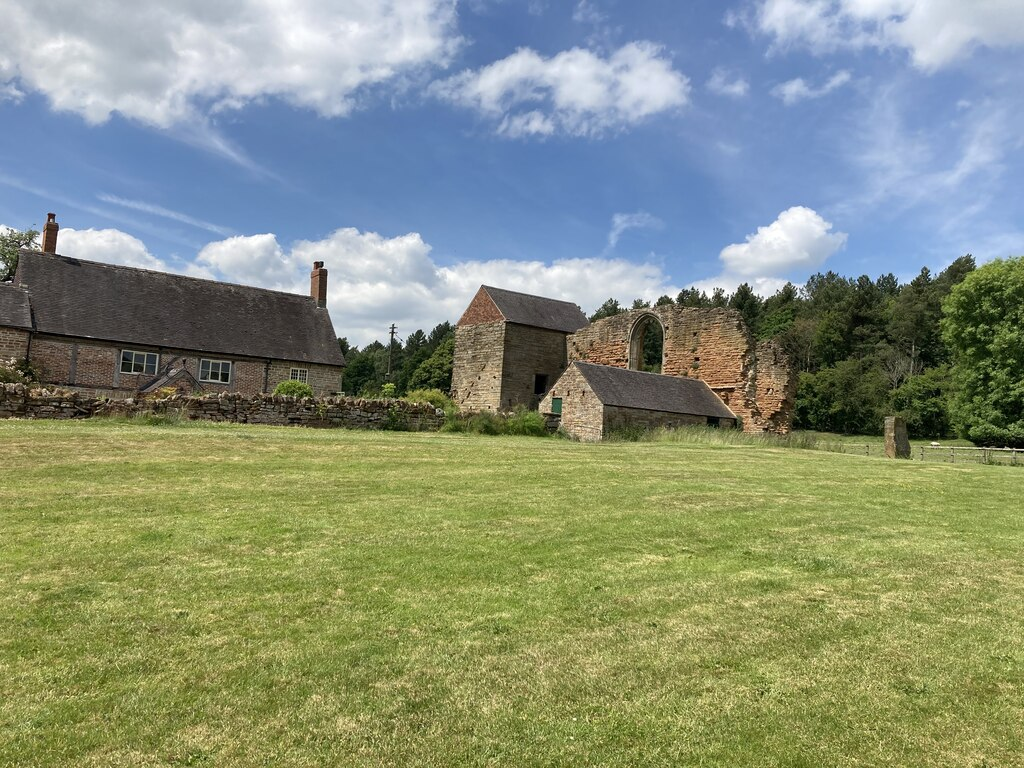
- Beauvale Priory

- Location within Nottinghamshire
- OS grid reference: SK481463
- District: Broxtowe
- Shire county: Nottinghamshire
- Region: East Midlands
- Country: England
- Sovereign state: United Kingdom
- Post town: NOTTINGHAM
- Postcode district: NG16
- Police: Nottinghamshire
- Fire: Nottinghamshire
- Ambulance: East Midlands

Beauvale, or Beauvale Newthorpe, is a village in Nottinghamshire, England. It is located 1 mile to the east of Eastwood. It is in Greasley parish. Beauvale Priory is the remains of a Carthusian monastery, or Charterhouse, founded in 1343 by Nicholas de Cantilupe. The extant remains include part of the church and a three-storey tower house, which may have been the Prior's lodging.

== See also ==
- Listed buildings in Greasley

== Gallery ==
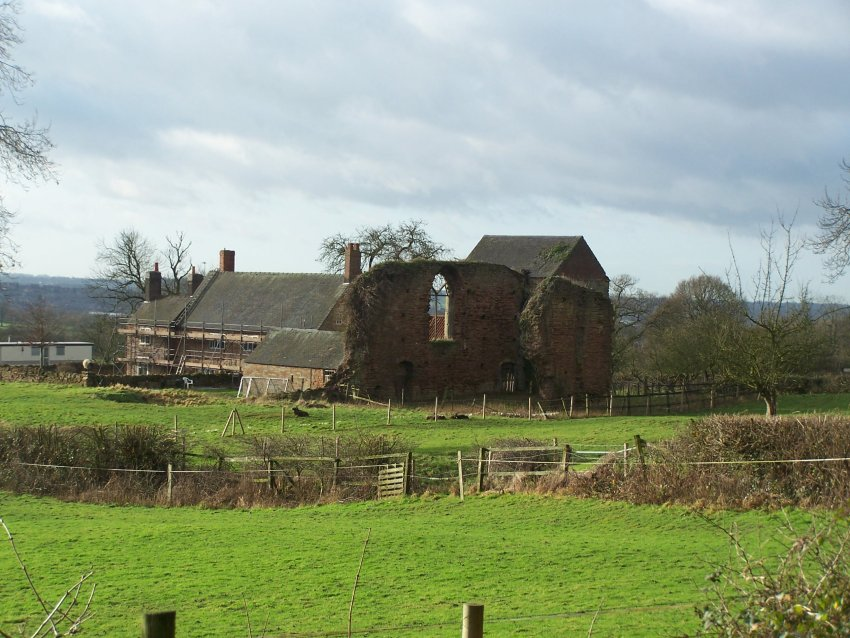
The structural remains of Beauvale Priory in 2007
