= Launcelot Rolleston =

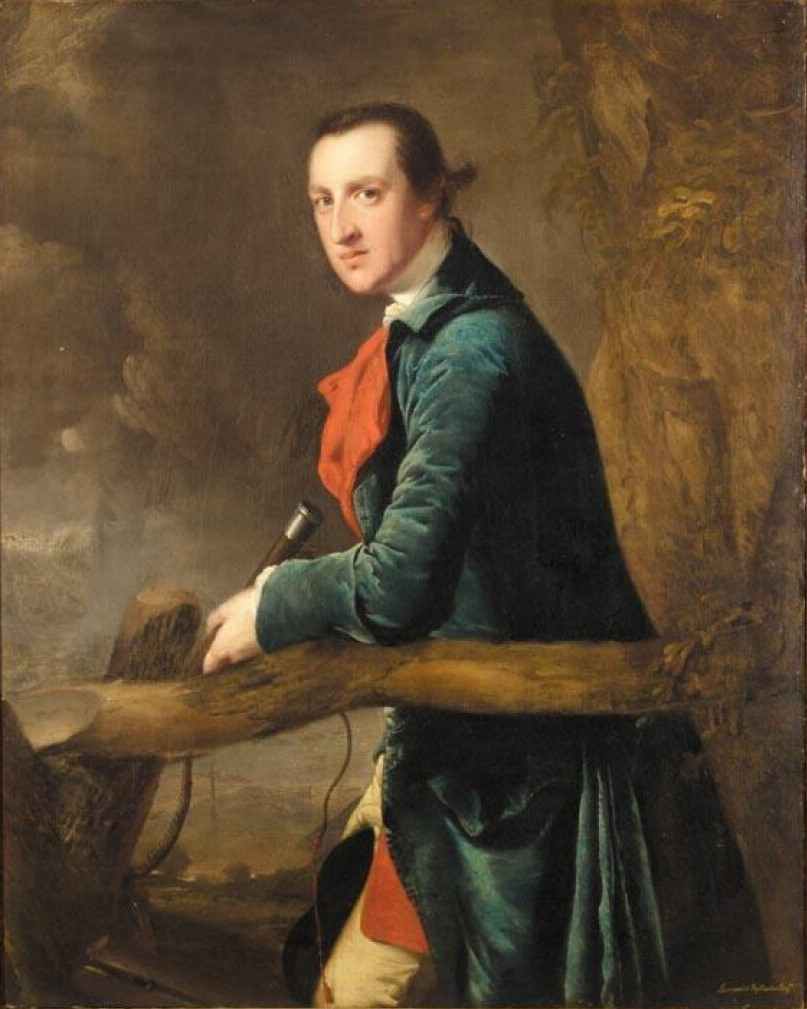
- by Joseph Wright of Derby
- Baptised: 27 January 1737
- Died: 25 April 1802 (aged 65)
- Resting place: Greasley St Mary
- Occupations: Gentleman, magistrate
- Parents: Revd John Rolleston (father); Dorothy Burdett (mother)
- Relatives: Lancelot Rolleston (nephew)

Launcelot Rolleston (January 1737 – 25 April 1802) was a member of the Markeaton hunt.

== Biography ==
Rolleston was baptised on 27 January 1737, the son of John Rolleston, the minister at Aston-on-Trent and Dorothy his wife. (Note: Revd John Rolleston (2 April 1705 – 13 June 1770) was the fourth son of Christopher Rolleston (c. 1669 -21 March 1737) and Hannah Holden (c. 1668-29 April 1725). He and Dorothy Burdett (18 May 1715 - 26 October 1794) were married on 11 January 1736. John Rolleston had inherited Watnall Hall from his brother, Lancelot Rolleston (14 August 1693 - 27 April 1751).) Rolleston's family seat was Watnall Hall in Nottinghamshire which he inherited on the death of his father in 1770.

In 1762–3 Francis Noel Clarke Mundy commissioned a set of six portraits of his friends in the Markeaton Hunt and one of these was Rolleston. Each of the subjects was in the distinctive dress of the Markeaton Hunt, consisting of a blue coat over a scarlet waistcoat and yellow breeches. These paintings hung at Mundy's ancestral home, Markeaton Hall.

Rolleston died on 25 April 1802 and was buried at St Mary's, Greasley, on 2 May 1802. (Note: Watnall Hall passed to Christopher Rolleston (bap 18 December 1739 – 3 April 1807), brother of Launcelot Rolleston.)
