= 1952 Special Honours =

British government recognitions

As part of the British honours system, Special Honours are issued at the Monarch's pleasure at any given time. The Special Honours refer to the awards made within royal prerogative, operational honours and other honours awarded outside the New Years Honours and Birthday Honours

== George Cross (GC) ==
- John Bamford, Colliery Worker, Newthorpe, Nottingham.

== Order of the Bath ==
=== Companions (CB) ===
- Brigadier (temporary) Robert Charles Cottrell-Hill, C.B.E., D.S.O., M.C. (28274), late Infantry.

== Order of the British Empire ==
=== Knight Commanders (KBE) ===
- William George Penney, Esq., O.B.E.

=== Commanders (CBE) ===
- Colonel (temporary) Neville Percy Breden, M.B, (53103). Royal Army Medical Corps.
- Brigadier (temporary) Lewis Henry Owain Pugh, D.S.O. (37091), late Royal Regiment of Artillery.
- Brigadier (temporary) Abdy Henry Gough Ricketts, D.S.O., O.B.E. (33748), late Infantry.
- Brigadier (temporary) Peter St. Clair-Ford, D.S.O. (33686), late Infantry.

=== Officers (OBE) ===
- Lieutenant-Colonel Reginald Carteret de Mussenden Leathes, M.V.O., Royal Marines.
- Lieutenant-Colonel (temporary) Arthur Kennedy Crookshank (380187), The Royal Fusiliers (City of London Regiment).
- Lieutenant-Colonel (temporary) Francis George Ruff, B.Sc., A.M.I.Mech.E. (53242), Royal Army Service Corps.
- Lieutenant-Colonel Gerald Abson Whiteley (145325), Extra Regimentally Employed List.
- Major Alexander Fred Austen, B.E.M. (360980), Royal Army Ordnance Corps.
- Major John Henry Edgar Bown (186119), The Gloucestershire Regiment.
- Major Eric Astley Cooper-Key, M.C. (74613), The Royal Norfolk Regiment.
- Major Patrick Vivian Gray (56676), The Cameronians (Scottish Rifles).
- Major (temporary) Michael Walter Holme, M.C. (117134), The Essex Regiment.
- Major (temporary) Edmond Robert Jolley (363758), 13th/18th Royal Hussars (Queen Mary's Own), Royal Armoured Corps.
- Major William Roland Lawson (65458), The Somerset Light Infantry (Prince Albert's).
- Captain (Quartermaster) Donald Charles Lewin (359226), The Sherwood Foresters (Nottinghamshire and Derbyshire Regiment).
- No. 354 Warrant Officer Class II Hassan bin Lokek, The Malay Regiment.
- Captain (temporary) (G.C.O.) Padambahadur Rai (388437), 10th Princess Mary's Own Gurkha Rifles.
- Major Michael William Temple Roberts (62879), The Green Howards (Alexandra, Princess of Wales's Own Yorkshire Regiment).
- Captain (Quartermaster) Edward David Sleight (317086), The Green Howards (Alexandra, Princess of Wales's Own Yorkshire Regiment).
- No. 7340821 Warrant Officer Class 1 (acting) William Trevor Thomas, M.M., 4th Queen's Own Hussars, Royal Armoured Corps.
- Major (temporary) John Bowsfield Vickers (363912), Corps of Royal Electrical and Mechanical Engineers.
- Major (temporary) Douglas Ivor Wilkes (335782), D.S.O., O.B.E. (33748), The South Staffordshire Regiment.

=== Members (MBE) ===
==== Military Division ====
- Captain (Quartermaster) Henry Stephen Russell Case (358150), The Suffolk Regiment.
- Major (temporary) Frank Leonard Clarkson (133777), Royal Corps of Signals.
- Captain Noel Philip de Odingsells Coke. Royal Marines.
- Major (temporary) Albert Patrick Dignan, M.B., F.R.C.S. (410605), Royal Army Medical Corps.
- Major (temporary) Jeffrey Robert Douglas (399418), Special Air Service Regiment.
- No. 3050742 Warrant Officer Class I Thomas William Evans, Army Physical Training Corps.
- Major (temporary) Thomas Edwin Gilbert Hand (117307), Corps of Royal Engineers.
- Major Launcelot Frederic Hard, M.C. (66347), The Welch Regiment.
- Major Arthur John Hardy (86396), The King's Shropshire Light Infantry.
- No. 4609113 Warrant Officer Class I (acting) Frank Healey, Corps of Royal Engineers.
- Major (temporary) Frederick Joseph Humble (205080), Royal Army Medical Corps.
- Major (Quartermaster) Alleyne Edward Leach (178903), Royal Army Service Corps.
- Captain William Donald McNaughtan (366399), 6th Gurkha Rifles.
- Major (temporary) Leslie Frederick Parmenter (325053), Corps of Royal Electrical and Mechanical Engineers.
- Major Evelyn David Vereker Prendergast, D.F.C. (74510), Royal Regiment of Artillery.
- Major John Richards. Royal Marines.
- Major (temporary) Walter John Rowland (250522), Corps of Royal Electrical and Mechanical Engineers.
- Major (temporary) Eric Morgan Salter, M.C. (334483), The Royal Ulster Rifles.
- Major Alan Nott Seagrim (380824), 10th Princess Mary's Own Gurkha Rifles.
- Major (temporary) Eric David Smith, D.S.O. (388771), 7th Gurkha Rifles.
- Major (temporary) William Spencer, M.C. (247419), Royal Army Ordnance Corps.
- Major Basil Anthony Bethune Taylor (74523), Royal Regiment of Artillery.
- Major (temporary) Maxwell Thomas Willis (391833), 7th Gurkha Rifles.

==== Civil Division ====
- Anthony Serle Pudner, Manager, Cable and Wireless Telecommunications Unit, Korea. (Ewell, Surrey.)

=== British Empire Medal (BEM) ===
==== Military Division ====
- No. 1878183 Staff-Sergeant James Derek Blenkiron, Corps of Royal Engineers.
- No. 7017485 Squadron Quartermaster Sergeant Thomas Lawrence Edwards, 4th Queen's Own Hussars, Royal Armoured Corps.
- No. 6895806 Squadron Quartermaster Sergeant (acting) Roland William Gardiner, Royal Corps of Signals.
- No. 1537177 Colour Sergeant John Gordon Morrison Ledingham, The Black Watch (Royal Highland Regiment).
- No. 21018281 Warrant Officer Class II (acting) William O'Neill, Royal Army Ordnance Corps.
- No. 2549706 Corporal (acting) Ronald Ernest Weighell, Royal Corps of Signals.
- No. T/14191556 Sergeant James Thomas Winning, Royal Army Service Corps.
- Colour Sergeant James George Buxton, Ply.X.1065, Royal Marines.
- Corporal (Acting Sergeant) John Hamilton, Ply.X.674, Royal Marines.
- Sergeant (T) Kenneth Roland Honeysett, Ply.X.4090, Royal Marines.
- Regimental Sergeant Major Percy James Thomas Reading, Po.X.1696, Royal Marines.
- A.5425 Corporal John Daly Kelly, Australian Air Force.

==== Civil Division ====
- Albert Arthur Victor Barker, Foreman, Grade II, Royal Ordnance Factory, Swynnerton. (Walton, Staffordshire.)
- John Simpson Burke, Constable, Metropolitan Police. (Bennondsey, S.E.1.)
- George Cheshire, Motor Driver, Road Haulage Executive, Liverpool.
- Charles Hill, Constable, City of Glasgow Police Force.
- Thomas Macdonald, Constable, City of Glasgow Police Force.
- Nathan Hyams, Wholesale Fruit Salesman, St. John's Wood, N.W.8.
- Che Man bin Ibrahim, Principal Officer, Grade 1, Pudu Prison, Federation of Malaya.
- William Martin, Fitter's Labourer, Grimsby.
- James Albert Penwarden, Sales Representative, Leeds.
- Albert Frank Wells, Sergeant, Metropolitan Police. (Balham, S.W.12.)
- John Foster, Constable, Metropolitan Police. (Deptford, S.E.8.)
- Sydney Furner, Constable, Metropolitan Police. (Deptford, S.E.8.)

== Distinguised Service Order (DSO) ==
- Lieutenant-Colonel William Maxwell Henning (41164), The Cameronians (Scottish Rifles).
- Colonel (temporary) Edward Dymoke Murray, O.B.E. (47348), 7th Gurkha Rifles.

== Military Cross (MC) ==
- Captain Leslie Hugh Joel, Royal Marines.
- Lieutenant Maxwell George Robert Darwall, Royal Marines.
- Captain (temporary) John Barlow (364428), The Green Howards (Alexandra, Princess of Wales's Own Yorkshire Regiment).
- Captain Peter Kenneth Bryceson (109005), The Cameronians (Scottish Rifles).
- Lieutenant John Colley Caiger (385013), The East Surrey Regiment.
- Second-Lieutenant (now Lieutenant) Frank Arthur Godfrey (407846), The Suffolk Regiment.
- Lieutenant (K.G.O.) Jaharman Sunwar (398070), 7lh Gurkha Rifles.
- Lieutenant James Patrick Gardner, Royal Marines.
- Lieutenant John Jeremy Moore, Royal Marines.
- Second-Lieutenant (now Lieutenant) Alan Bentham Horrex (411976), The Suffolk Regiment.
- Captain (temporary) (Q.G.O.) Karnabahadur Rai, I.O.M. (398049), 10th Princess Mary's Own Gurkha Rifles.
- Captain (Q.G.O.) Sarbajit Gurung (394550), 6th Gurkha Rifles.
- Major (temporary) James Thomas Stewart (356346), The West Yorkshire Regiment (The Prince of Wales's Own).

== Distinguised Flying Cross (DFC) ==
- Captain Thomas Norman Warner Lacey (235027), Royal Regiment of Artillery.
- Lieutenant John Ferguson Campbell (365040), Royal Regiment of Artillery.
- Lieutenant David Tod Young (354597), The Royal Scots (The Royal Regiment).

== George Medal (GM) ==
- A. 11162 Leading Aircraftman Robert Mansfield Stewart, Royal Australian Air Force.

== Military Medal (MM) ==
- Sergeant Jack Stanley Aubertin, Po.X.2916, Royal Marines.
- Marine (Acting Corporal) Peter Edward Dale, Ply.X.5637, Royal Marines.
- Corporal (Acting Sergeant) Peter Leash Simpson, R.M.8073, Royal Marines.
- No. 22540708 Private James Waugh Appleby, The Green Howards (Alexandra, Princess of Wales's Own Yorkshire Regiment).
- No. 21132021 Sergeant Bhagtasing Pun, 2nd King Edward VII's Own Gurkha Rifles.
- No. 21138065 Corporal Dipbahadur Limbu, 7th Gurkha Rifles.
- No. 22233520 Private Peter Gilmour, The Seaforth Highlanders (Ross-shire Buffs, The Duke of Albany's).
- No. 3035 Sergeant Ismail bin Haji Tahir, The Malay Regiment.
- No. 21135721 Rifleman Harkabahadur Rai, 10th Princess Mary's Own Gurkha Rifles.
- No. 21135154 Lance-Corporal (acting) Jitaram Ghale, 6th Gurkha Rifles.
- No. 21142223 Corporal Lokbahadur Limbu, 10th Princess Mary's Own Gurkha Rifles.
- No. 21139045 Corporal Purnabahadur Sunwar, 7th Gurkha Rifles.
- No. 2779 Lance-Corporal Mohamed bin Tohid, The Malay Regiment.
- No. 1447606 Sergeant (acting) Frank Frederick Turner, 13th/18th Royal Hussars (Queen Mary's Own), Royal Armoured Corps.

== Associate of the Royal Red Cross, Second Class (ARRC) ==
- Major Elilah Verina Wallace (206528), Queen Alexandra's Royal Army Nursing Corps.

== Queen's Commendation for Brave Conduct ==
- Derrick Edgar Theodore Bull, Constable, Wiltshire Constabulary.
- Victor Hall Oxford, Bricklayer, Fordingbridge, Hampshire.
- George Donaldson, Shift Control Engineer, Kilmarnock Power Station, British Electricity Authority. (Ardrossan, Ayrshire.)
- Neil Dempsey Thom, Electrician, Kilmarnock Power Station, British Electricity Authority. (Prestwick, Ayrshire.)
- Ronald Arthur Jesse Dubery, Constable, Metropolitan Police. (Chelsea, S.W.3.)
- Edith Annie, Mrs. Foster, Housewife, Sutton-on-Trent, Newark, Nottinghamshire.
- Wilfred Gardner, Sub-Postmaster, Chesham, Buckinghamshire.
- Robert Hamilton, Glasgow.
- Frank Hilton, Divisional Officer, Grade HI, Birkenhead Fire Brigade.
- Edwin Hough (deceased), Game Ranger, Department of Game and Tsetse Control, Northern Rhodesia.
- Joseph Kay, Aircraft Fitter, Handley Page Ltd. (Purford, Yorkshire.)
- John Macleod (deceased), Constable, City of Glasgow Police Force.
- Joseph Parry, Colliery Shotfirer, Llay Main Colliery, National Coal Board, (Llay, nr. Wrexham.)
- William Partington, Colliery Deputy, Llay Main Colliery, National Coal Board, (Cymmau, nr. Wrexham.)
- Eric Harold Powell, Caterer, Whitley Bay, Northumberland.
- Denis Smith, Representative, Birtley, Durham.
- Stanley George Sayers, Constable, Metropolitan Police (Southwark, S.E.1)
- Ada, Mrs Spillett, Housewife, Golders Green London N.W.11.)
- Ivor William Thompson, Student, Westcliffe-on-Sea.

== Queen's Commendation for Valuable Service in the Air ==
- Raymond Colin Oswald Lovelock, D.F.C, Captain, Civil Aircraft, Airwork Ltd. (Fleet, Hampshire)
