= Listed buildings in Brinsley =

Brinsley is a civil parish in the Borough of Broxtowe, Nottinghamshire, England. The parish contains two listed buildings that are recorded in the National Heritage List for England. Both the listed buildings are designated at Grade II, the lowest of the three grades, which is applied to "buildings of national importance and special interest". The parish contains the village of Brinsley and the surrounding countryside, and the listed buildings consist of a farmhouse and a church.

== Buildings ==
Name and location	Photograph	Date	Notes
Hall Farmhouse; 53.03882°N 1.32555°W		17th century	The farmhouse, which was extended and altered in about 1875, is in brick and stone, partly rendered, on a stone plinth, and has slate roofs. There are two storeys, and an L-shaped plan, with a main range of four bays. Most of the windows are casements, there is a French window, a horizontally-sliding sash window, and in a wing is a bow window. At the northeast is a two-storey square gabled turret.
Church of St. James the Great; 53.03805°N 1.31380°W		1837–38	The chancel and organ chamber were added in 1877. The church is built in Mansfield stone, and has roofs of tile and slate. It consists of a nave with two west towers, a south porch, and a chancel with an organ chamber to the north and a vestry to the south. The towers are octagonal and have embattled parapets, the porch is gabled and has a doorway with a pointed arch and a traceried fanlight, and the windows are lancets, with triple lancets at the east and west ends.
