= Listed buildings in Greasley =

Greasley is a civil parish in the Borough of Broxtowe, Nottinghamshire, England. The parish contains 30 listed buildings that are recorded in the National Heritage List for England. Of these, two are listed at Grade II*, the middle of the three grades, and the others are at Grade II, the lowest grade. The parish contains the settlements of Beauvale, Moorgreen and Watnall and the surrounding area. Most of the listed buildings are houses, cottages and associated structures, farmhouses and farm buildings. The others include the remains of a fortified manor house, a church and a former chapel, and a school.

== Key ==
Grade	Criteria
II*	Particularly important buildings of more than special interest
II	Buildings of national importance and special interest

== Buildings ==
Name and location	Photograph	Date	Notes	Grade
Greasley Castle remains 53.01924°N 1.26938°W		c. 1341	The remains of a fortified manor house have been altered and partly incorporated into farm buildings. The buildings are in stone and brick with roofs of slate and asbestos sheeting. They are in a single storey with lofts and form a U-shaped plan around a yard, and are surrounded by a dry moat. They are used as barns, stables and cowsheds.	II
Beauvale Priory Church and Prior's Lodgings; 53.03661°N 1.26725°W		1343	The priory was later extended, but dissolved in 1537, and what remains are part of the gatehouse range, two walls of the church, and the prior's lodgings. The buildings are in sandstone with dressings in gritstone. The prior's lodgings is built against the south wall of the nave of the church, and has quoins and a tile roof. There are two storeys, an undercroft and an attic. In the north end is a doorway with a pointed arch, a chamfered surround, imposts and a hood mould. Above it is a relieving arch of voussoirs, and there are other arched doorways, and windows.	II*
Beauvale Priory Gatehouse Range; 53.03569°N 1.26675°W		1343	The gatehouse range, which was altered in the 19th and 20th centuries, is in sandstone and red brick, and has roofs of tile and corrugated sheeting. There is a single storey, the west part is raised, and it has an L-shaped plan with a rear wing. The range has been much altered, and contains various openings.	II
Beauvale Priory boundary wall 53.03633°N 1.26649°W		1343	The wall extends along the east side of the priory precinct. It is in sandstone, and contains a doorway at the southern end. The wall is about 85 metres (279 ft) long, with a maximum height of 2 metres (6 ft 7 in), and along its length are small square openings with stone lintels.	II
St Mary's Church, Greasley; 53.01977°N 1.27187°W		15th century	The church has been altered and extended through the centuries, the nave and the chancel were rebuilt in 1896, and vestries were added in 1910 and 1962. It is built in stone with tile roofs, and consists of a nave, north and south aisles, a chancel with vestries, and a west tower. The tower has three stages, corner buttresses, a moulded and chamfered plinth, string courses, four gargoyles, and an embattled parapet with eight crocketed pinnacles. On the west side is a doorway with a moulded surround and a hood mould, above which is a triple lancet window with a hood mould, and the bell openings have two lights. The aisles also have embattled parapets.	II
The Hollies; 53.00800°N 1.25442°W	—	16th century	The house, which was later altered and extended, is in brick and stone with tile roofs, and there are two storeys. The older north range originated as a timber framed hall house, and it was later encased. The front range has three bays, the openings with segmental heads. In the centre is a doorway with a fanlight, and the windows in the house are a mix of sashes and casements. At the rear are single-storey outbuildings.	II
Beauvale Abbey Farmhouse; 53.03637°N 1.26741°W		17th century (probable)	The farmhouse was built with materials from the ruins of Beauvale Priory. It is in stone, partly pebbledashed and partly tile hung, with some timber framing and a tile roof. There are two storeys, a front range of three bays, and a projecting parallel rear range. On the front is a doorway with a hood, and the windows are casements.	II
Beauvale Manor Farmhouse, gatehouse and wall 53.03201°N 1.26470°W		17th century	The farmhouse is in stone and brick, with partly cogged and rebated eaves, and a tile roof. There are two storeys and an L-shaped plan, with fronts of four bays, and the windows are casements. To the right is a gatehouse, the lower storey in stone, the upper part in brick, containing a segmental-headed archway, the inner walls timber framed with brick nogging, above which are three tiers of pigeonholes. The boundary wall has chamfered stone coping, and the garden wall is medieval; both walls contain a square-headed doorway, each with a moulded and chamfered surround.	II
Font; 53.01909°N 1.27048°W	—	17th century	The font, later used as a garden ornament, is in stone. It has a tapered ringed round stem, on which is an egg-cup bowl with a banded rim.	II
Greasley Castle Farmhouse; 53.01925°N 1.27028°W		17th century	The farmhouse is built in brick, and incorporates material from the ruined Greasley Castle. It is rendered, and has a floor band and roofs of tile and slate. There are three storeys and an L-shaped plan, with a main range of five bays and a two-storey two-bay service wing on the left. On the front is a doorway with a rectangular fanlight, most of the windows are sashes, and there are some casement windows and a circular window. To the right is a boundary wall with ramped slab coping.	II
Barn and stable, The Hollies; 53.00811°N 1.25470°W	—	17th century	The barn and stable, later converted for residential use, are in brick on a stone plinth, with stone dressings, and a roof of tile and slate with a coped gable. There are two storeys, three bays, and a single range. The openings include doorways, windows, a loading door and a hatch, some with segmental heads.	II
Gates, 54 Moorgreen; 53.02053°N 1.27952°W		1709	At the entrance to the drive is a pair of wrought iron gates. They have ornate cresting, and were moved to their present site from Collins Almshouses, Nottingham, in 1973.	II
Lamb Close House, cottage and conservatory 53.03393°N 1.28812°W	—	Early 18th century	A large house that was extensively remodelled in the 19th century, it is in stone and brick with stone dressings, floor bands, and tile roofs. There are two storeys and a square plan, with sides of eight bays. On the front is a porch with Corinthian piers and a balustrade, two-storey bay windows, and French windows. The other windows are a mix of sashes, some with keystones, and casements, some with mullions. To the left is a two-storey gardener's cottage, and further to the left is an iron conservatory with a finial. To the west is a service wing with two storeys and ten bays, and a later extension with an L-shaped plan, two storeys and four bays, containing a turret with a canted oriel window.	II
Poplar Farmhouse and stables 53.01815°N 1.28221°W		Mid 18th century	The farmhouse is in stone and brick, partly pebbledashed, with a tile roof. There are two storeys and an L-shaped plan, with a front range of two bays, and a catslide roof at the rear. On the front is a doorway with a tiled hood and mullioned casement windows, those in the ground floor with splayed lintels and keystones. At the rear are casement and sash windows, and a gabled dormer with tilehanging. Behind the farmhouse are stables in brick with one and two storeys, forming an L-shaped plan.	II
Stone Cottage; 53.01005°N 1.25551°W		Mid 18th century	The cottage is in stone, partly rendered, and it has a pantile roof with coped gables. There are two storeys, and a single range with three bays. In the centre is a gabled porch, and the windows are casements.	II
The Sexton's House; 53.02003°N 1.27201°W		Mid 18th century	The house, which was raised in the 19th century, is in brick with a floor band and tile roofs. There are two storeys and an attic, and an L-shaped plan, with a front range of two bays and a rear wing. The windows are a mix of sashes and casements, and to the right is a single-storey outbuilding.	II
Moorgreen Chapel; 53.02428°N 1.27740°W		Late 18th century	The chapel, later converted for residential use, is in brick with a hipped slate roof. There are two storeys and four bays, and former meeting rooms at the rear with a gabled roof. On the front are two gabled porches, and the windows on the front are casements, with stone sills, and wedge lintels with prominent keystones. At the rear are horizontally-sliding sash windows with segmental-arched heads.	II
Old Haggs Farmhouse; 53.04624°N 1.28776°W	—	Late 18th century	The farmhouse is in brick with partial dentilled eaves and a tile roof. There are two storeys and a single range with five unequal bays. On the front are two doorways, one with a hood on brackets, and the other with a segmental head. The windows are casements, and there is a gabled dormer. To the rear are outshuts, and on the left are single-storey brick stables.	II
31 Moorgreen; 53.02005°N 1.28038°W		Early 19th century	A farmhouse, later a private house, that was extended in about 1875 by E. W. Godwin. It is in brick on a plinth, with a tile roof. There is a single storey with attics, and an L-shaped plan with a front range of two bays, and a later single-storey extension on the left. On the front is a gabled porch, most of the windows are sashes, and there is a gabled dormer.	II
Lamb Close Lodge; 53.03522°N 1.28713°W	—	Mid 18th century	The lodge, later a private house, is in stone on a plinth, with quoins, blocked architraves, boxed eaves and a hipped tile roof. There are two storeys, and a T-shaped plan, with a front range of three bays, and a rear wing. The doorway has a fanlight and a hood on scrolled brackets, and the windows are casements with various shaped heads, some with keystones.	II
Beauvale House, service wing, stables and wall 53.03751°N 1.27741°W	—	1871–73	A country house designed by E. W. Godwin, in brick, timber framing with brick nogging, and tilehanging, and tile roofs. There are two storeys and attics, an L-shaped plan, and a front range of five bays. The doorway has a fanlight, most of the window are casements, some with segmental heads, and there are gabled dormers. On the southeast front is a hipped corner tower with two stages, and a two-storey bay window with a conical roof. The northeast front has a three-storey canted bay window with a conical roof, and in the centre is a square tower with a moulded string course, a parapet, a timber framed lantern with a pyramidal roof, and a wind vane. To the northwest are a lower service wing and stable range. Outside is a garden wall with a C-shaped plan, and a pierced design made from semicircular terracotta components.	II*
130 and 132 Moorgreen; 53.02594°N 1.27773°W		1872	A pair of cottages designed by E. W. Godwin in brick on a chamfered plinth, with a tile roof. There are two storeys, and a T-shaped plan, with a front range of three bays. The middle bay projects and is gabled, with tilehanging between the floors, the doorways in the return angles, and a datestone in the gable. The windows are leaded casements.	II
Beauvale Lodge; 53.03224°N 1.28222°W		c. 1873	The lodge at the entrance to the drive to Beauvale House, later a private house, was designed by E. W. Godwin. It is in brick with tilehanging and tile roofs. There are two storeys and an irregular two-bay plan. The windows are leaded casements, some with segmental heads. On the west front is a two-storey canted bay window on a plinth, with a faceted conical roof. The porch is formed by a catslide roof with a buttress to the right.	II
New Haggs Farmhouse; 53.04659°N 1.28777°W	—	1873	The farmhouse, which was designed by E. W. Godwin, is in brick with a tile roof, two storeys and a single range of three bays. On the north front is a doorway with a segmental head, and on the south front is a timber porch. The windows are casements with segmental heads, and there are two dormers, one with a catslide roof, and the other gabled with tilehanging.	II
The Manse; 53.02567°N 1.27763°W	—	1873	The manse, later a private house, was designed by E. W. Godwin and later extended. It is in brick with tilehanging and some timber framing, on a chamfered plinth, with stone dressings, and tile roofs. There is an irregular plan, the doorway has a moulded stone surround and an ogee head, the windows are a mix of sashes and casements, and there is a large tile-hung gabled dormer. Other features include a two-storey canted bay window, a dated plaque, and a timber framed gable with herringbone brick nogging, ogee bargeboards, and a louvred vent.	II
Hall Farmhouse and pigeoncote 53.01258°N 1.25611°W		c. 1875	The farmhouse is in brick, with quoins, moulded and cogged string courses, cogged and chamfered eaves, and roofs of tile and slate. There are two storeys and four bays. On the front is a two-storey tower porch with a shaped gable, a plaque with a shield, and a gabled dormer. On the south gable end is a canted bay window, and the other windows are casements. To the north is a single-storey outbuilding with two bays and a hipped roof, and attached to this is a pigeoncote, with two stages, round windows with keystones, and a pyramidal roof with a wind vane.	II
Hunt's Hill Cottages; 53.03717°N 1.29264°W		1877	A pair of estate cottages designed by E. W. Godwin, in brick on a plinth, with a tile roof. There are two storeys, three bays, a gabled single-storey rear wing, and a later single-storey extension on the left. On the front are two doorways with segmental heads, one with a weatherboarded hood, and a datestone. The windows are a mix of mullioned casements and sashes with segmental heads, and there are three dormers.	II
D. H. Lawrence School; 53.01773°N 1.28755°W		1877–78	The school, which is on a corner site, is built in Staffordshire red brick with Matlock stone dressings and a tile roof. It has an arrow-shaped plan, with three wings radiating from a central corner entrance block. The corner block is gabled with two-storeys. It contains a doorway with a segmental-headed fanlight flanked by small windows, over which is an inscribed and dated plaque. Above this are three windows and moulded brick decoration in the gable, which is coped and has a finial. Flanking the block are curved single-storey wings, each with three windows and a doorway. The radiating wings have a tall single storey, with dentilled eaves, coped gables and finials. On the right wing is a square wooden bellcote with a pyramidal roof and a finial.	II
Oaks Farm Old Farmhouse; 53.03811°N 1.28900°W	—	1878	The farmhouse, later a private house, was designed by E. W. Godwin, and is in brick on a chamfered plinth, with a tile roof. There are two storeys and an L-shaped plan, with a front range of three bays, a gabled rear wing and a lean-to, and a later extension in the angle. In the centre of the east wing is a doorway with a sloping tiled hood on brackets. Most of the windows are sashes with segmental heads, and there are also casement windows, and two gabled dormers with tilehanging.	II
52 and 54 Moorgreen; 53.02045°N 1.27950°W		1895	A pair of cottages designed by E. W. Godwin in brick with a tile roof. There are two storeys, and a T-shaped plan, with a front range of three bays, and rear extensions. The middle bay projects and is gabled, with tilehanging between the floors, the doorways in the return angles, and a dated plaque in the gable. The windows are a mix of casements, and sashes.	II
