= Listed buildings in Eastwood, Nottinghamshire =

Eastwood is a civil parish in the Borough of Broxtowe, Nottinghamshire, England. The parish contains 13 listed buildings that are recorded in the National Heritage List for England. All the listed buildings are designated at Grade II, the lowest of the three grades, which is applied to "buildings of national importance and special interest". The parish contains the town of Eastwood and the surrounding area. The listed buildings include houses, cottages and associated structures, farmhouses and farm buildings, a public house, an aqueduct, and two war memorials. The author D. H. Lawrence was born in the town and two of the houses in which he lived are listed, including his birthplace, which has been converted into a museum.

== Buildings ==
Name and location	Photograph	Date	Notes
10 Church Street; 53.01627°N 1.30837°W	—	Mid 17th century	The house has been extended, the earlier part is timber framed with brick nogging, the later part is in brick, and the roof is tiled. It is in two and three storeys, and has an L-shaped plan. Most of the windows are casements, and there are two gabled dormers. Inside there is exposed timber framing.
The Grove and stables 53.01227°N 1.31007°W	—	c. 1700	A farmhouse, later a private house, in brick with stone dressings, floor bands, and a pantile roof. There are two storeys and attics, and an L-shaped plan, with a front of two bays, a two-storey rear wing, and a single-storey extension. Most of the windows are sashes. Attached to the house is a stable with one and two storeys, and an L-shaped plan, containing casement windows.
140 Church Street; 53.01120°N 1.31235°W	—	Mid 18th century	A farmhouse in rendered and pebbledashed brick, with quoins, lintel bands, dentilled eaves, and a tile roof with coped shouldered gables. The main block has three storeys and two bays, and to the right is a wing with two storeys and two bays. The doorway has a fanlight, and the windows are sashes with splayed lintels.
The Old Wine Vaults; 53.01726°N 1.30819°W	—	Late 18th century	The public house is in brick with rebated eaves and slate roofs. There are three storeys and three bays, and a single-storey extension to the right. In the centre is a doorway with a moulded surround and a fanlight, and the windows are sashes with splayed lintels.
The Rookery; 53.01175°N 1.31080°W	—	Late 18th century	A farmhouse later used for other purposes, in brick with cogged and rebated eaves, and a slate roof with coped gables. There are three storeys, and an L-shaped plan, with a main range of three bays, and later extensions. In the centre is a doorway with an arcaded fanlight and a hood on scrolled brackets. The lower two floors contain sash windows with splayed lintels and keystones, and in the top floor are casement windows.
Aqueduct; 53.00465°N 1.31335°W		1779	The aqueduct carries the Erewash Canal over the River Erewash. It is in sandstone, and consists of three segmental arches with a plain band.
28 Garden Road; 53.02067°N 1.29838°W		c. 1880	A miner's cottage, at one time the home of D. H. Lawrence, it is in brick, on a chamfered plinth, with a dentilled floor band, dentilled eaves, an eaves band, and a slate roof. The house is at the end of a row, with two storeys and attics, the gabled end facing the street, and three bays on the side. In the centre is a lean-to porch, and the windows are casements with chamfered segmental heads.
Eastwood Hall; 53.02394°N 1.31028°W		c. 1810	A house, later used for other purposes, in stuccoed brick, on a plinth, with stone dressings, a floor band, bracketed eaves, and a hipped slate roof. There are two storeys, fronts of six and five bays, and a service wing. On the front is a porch with unfluted Greek Ionic columns, a doorway with a moulded surround and a fanlight, and sash windows, those in the ground floor with aprons. On the garden front are French windows and two-storey round bay windows with conical roofs. The service wing has two storeys and seven bays, and contains casement windows.
Hall Farm Buildings; 53.02623°N 1.30853°W		Early 19th century	A model farm, the buildings are in brick with stone dressings, and have hipped and pyramidal slate roofs. They are arranged round three sides of a courtyard, and have one or two storeys. The buildings consist of a barn, pigeoncotes, stables and two cottages. The windows are a mix of casements and horizontally-sliding sashes with chamfered segmental heads.
36, 37, 38 and 39 Scargill Walk; 53.01864°N 1.30728°W	—	c. 1870	A row of cottages, later workshops, in red brick with stone dressings, dentilled eaves and a slate roof. There are two storeys and five bays. The doorways have fanlights, the windows are sashes, and all these openings have splayed lintels. In the centre is a round-headed passage doorway with a keystone, above which is a round-headed window. The openings at the rear have segmental heads.
8A Victoria Street; 53.01860°N 1.30705°W		c. 1875	The birthplace of D. H. Lawrence, converted into a museum in 1980, it is in red brick, with dentilled eaves and a slate roof. There are two storeys and attics, and three bays. In the ground floor is a plain carriage entrance, and to the right is a shop front with a hood and a doorway with a fanlight. The upper floor contains three sash windows with splayed lintels.
Eastwood War Memorial; 53.01651°N 1.29987°W		1921	The war memorial is in an enclosure by a road junction. It consists of an obelisk on a plinth in Italian marble, on a two-stepped base of Whatstandwell stone. On the front of the obelisk is a carved wreath, and on the front of the plinth are carvings of a crossed rifle, a sword and a standard, and inscriptions. The other faces of the plinth have the names of those lost in the two World Wars. The area is surrounded by a chain link fence with a low brick wall at the rear.
Ambulance Training Corps War Memorial; 53.01547°N 1.29584°W	—	1927	The war memorial stands in a walled garden by a road junction. It contains a memorial to members of the Ambulance Training Corps who died in the two World Wars, and consists of a stone wheel-head cross with a reversed sword carved in low relief. The cross is on a tapering pedestal on a plinth, and on the pedestal are inscriptions and the names of those who were lost. On the corner of the wall is a granite cross and a bronze memorial plaque commemorating the Sherwood Foresters.
