= Martin McIntyre =

English cricketer

Martin McIntyre (15 August 1847 – 28 February 1885) was an English first-class cricketer who played for Nottinghamshire from 1868 to 1877. He was born in Eastwood, Nottinghamshire, and died in Moorgreen.

McIntyre was a right-handed batsman and a right-arm round-arm fast bowler from a mining background. In 77 first-class games he scored 1,992 runs at an average of 16.32 and took 194 wickets at an average of 17.39. In a low-scoring match for Nottinghamshire against Surrey in 1872, he made 88 not out and 28, and took 9 for 33 and 3 for 66. For North against South at Lord's in 1873 he took 8 for 18 in the South's first innings then top-scored with 77 in the North's second innings. He toured Australia with W. G. Grace's XI in 1873–74.

McIntyre's career was hampered by his heavy drinking. He died of tuberculosis in 1885 aged 37, leaving a widow and children.
