= St Mary's Church, Greasley =

Coordinates: 53°01′10″N 01°16′19″W

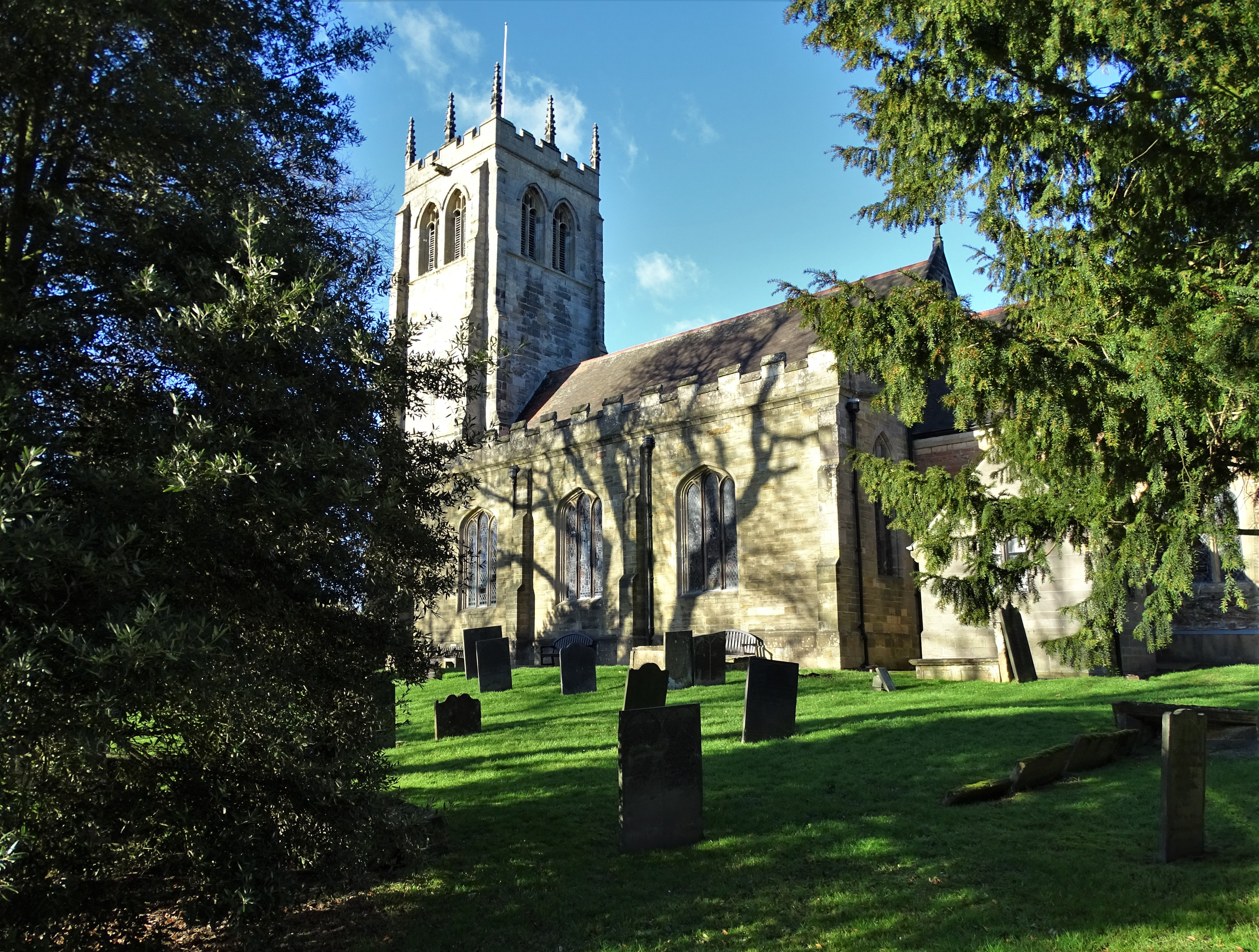
- St Mary's Church, Greasley
- St Mary's Church, Greasley
- Denomination: Church of England
- Churchmanship: Broad Church
- Website: www.greasleychurch.org.uk

History
- Dedication: St Mary

Administration
- Province: York
- Diocese: Southwell and Nottingham
- Parish: Greasley

St Mary's Church, Greasley is a parish church in the Church of England in Greasley, Nottinghamshire.

The church is Grade II listed by the Department for Digital, Culture, Media and Sport as it is a building of special architectural or historic interest.

== History ==
The church is medieval, built in the mid-15th century and was restored in 1882. It had previously been restored in 1753, 1772 and 1832. However, mining subsidence caused the tower to separate from the chancel and the nave, and in 1896 the church was virtually rebuilt at a cost of £2,000. The font pre-dates the church, being 14th century.

== Stained glass ==
The church contains some fragments of stained glass from Beauvale Charterhouse.

== Organ ==
The church has a pipe organ by Charles Lloyd of Nottingham dating from 1910. It was the gift of Major Thomas Philip Barber. The specification of the organ can be found on the National Pipe Organ Register

== Memorials ==
- Peniston Lamb, 1st Viscount Melbourne North West corner of the tower.

== See also ==
- Listed buildings in Greasley

== Sources ==
- The Buildings of England, Nottinghamshire. Nikolaus Pevsner
