= Watnall =

Coordinates: 53.006°N 1.253°W

- Location within Nottinghamshire
- OS grid reference: SK 50119 45704
- District: Borough of Broxtowe
- Shire county: Nottinghamshire
- Region: East Midlands
- Country: England
- Sovereign state: United Kingdom
- Post town: NOTTINGHAM
- Postcode district: NG16
- Dialling code: 0115
- Police: Nottinghamshire
- Fire: Nottinghamshire
- Ambulance: East Midlands
- UK Parliament: Broxtowe

Watnall is an area in the Borough of Broxtowe in Nottinghamshire, England. It is part of Greasley civil parish, and is located one mile north of Kimberley. It is in the Nuthall West and Greasley (Watnall) ward of Broxtowe Council. The village is barely separated from Nuthall. Watnall Hall was built c. 1690 and demolished in 1962. Today, only the gate piers, fragments of the stone boundary wall and lodge remain on Main Road. Its owners included Launcelot Rolleston in the 18th century. (Note: Owners of Watnall Hall included: Christopher Rolleston (c. 1669 – 21 March 1737); Launcelot Rolleston (14 August 1693 – 27 April 1751); Revd John Rolleston (2 April 1705 – 13 June 1770); Launcelot Rolleston (bap 27 January 1737 – 25 April 1802); Christopher Rolleston (bap 18 December 1739 – 3 April 1807); Lancelot Rolleston (20 July 1785 – 18 May 1862); Sir Lancelot Rolleston (19 August 1847 – 29 March 1941); Lady Emma Charlotte Maud Rolleson (née Dalzell) (2 September 1859 – 13 November 1949); Mrs Eleanor Maud Dayrell (née Rolleson) (11 Apr 1912 – 8 May 2001)). Even though only a village, Watnall is home to many businesses and organisations, such as British Bakeries aero fabrications, Custom Duct, midland industrial designers and the Nottingham meteorological centre. There are three World War II bunkers in Watnall that served as Royal Air Force Fighter Command for the Midlands.

== See also ==
- Listed buildings in Greasley
