= Greasley =

Coordinates: 53.02°N 1.27°W

- Civil parish
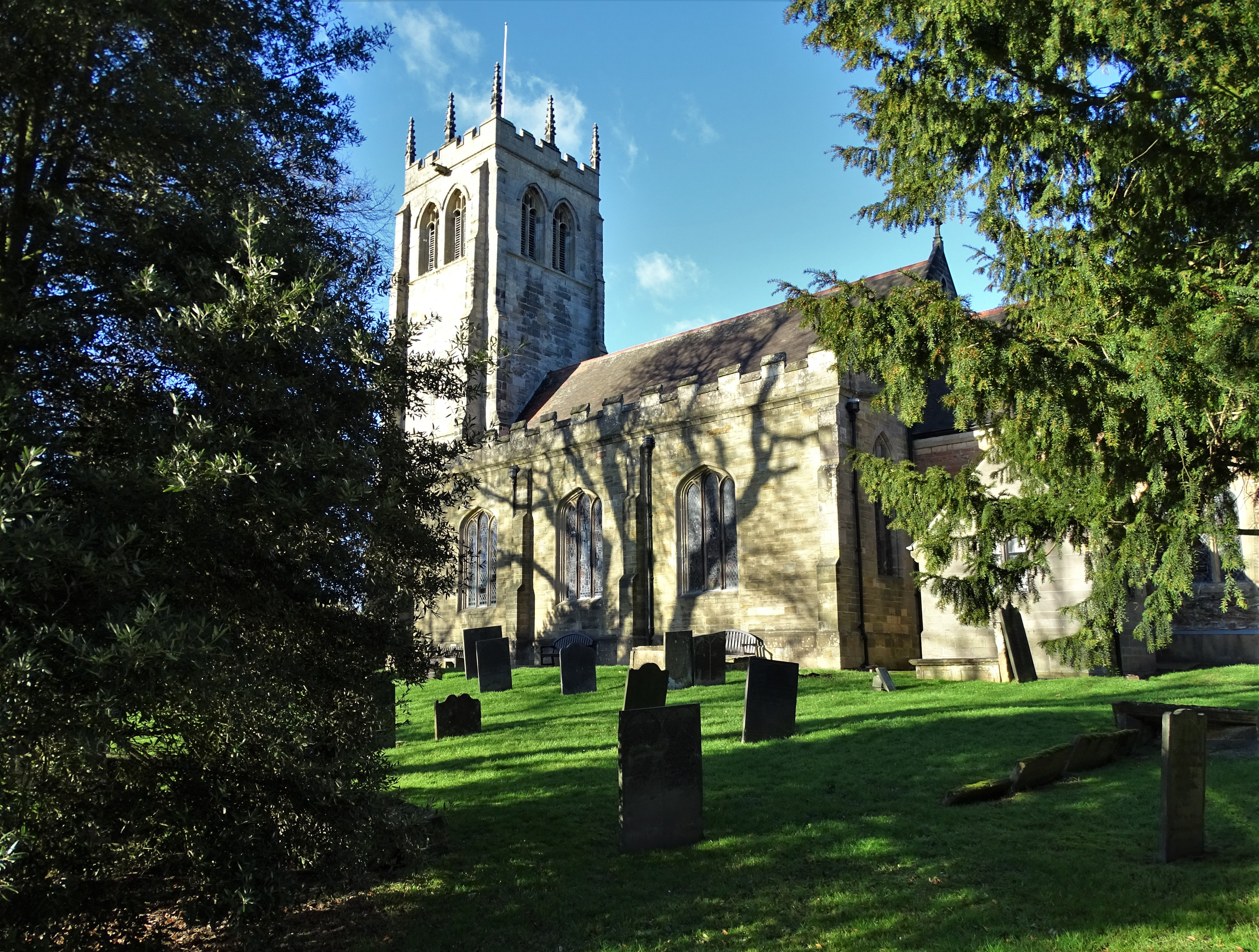
- St Mary’s Church

- Location within Nottinghamshire
- Interactive map of Greasley
- Area: 7.63 sq mi (19.8 km^{2})
- Population: 11,241 (2021)
  - Density: 1,473/sq mi (569/km^{2})
- OS grid reference: SK 4947
  - London: 110 mi (180 km) SE
- District: Borough of Broxtowe
- Shire county: Nottinghamshire
- Region: East Midlands
- Country: England
- Sovereign state: United Kingdom
- Settlements: Beauvale, Bogend, Giltbrook, Lower Beauvale, Moorgreen/Greasley, Newthorpe, Watnall
- Post town: NOTTINGHAM
- Postcode district: NG16
- Dialling code: 0115 and 01773
- Police: Nottinghamshire
- Fire: Nottinghamshire
- Ambulance: East Midlands
- UK Parliament: Broxtowe
- Website: greasleyparishcouncil.gov.uk

Greasley is a civil parish north west of Nottingham in Nottinghamshire, England. Although it is thought there was once a village called Greasley, there is no settlement of that name today as it was destroyed by the Earl of Rutland. The built up areas in the parish are Beauvale, Giltbrook, Moorgreen (often confused with Greasley), Newthorpe, Watnall and parts of Eastwood, Kimberley and Nuthall. There is also a small hamlet known as Bog-End. The parish is one of the largest in Nottinghamshire at 7.63 square miles (19.8 km^{2}), the 2001 UK Census reporting it had a total population of 10,467, increasing to 11,014 in 2011, and 11,241 at the 2021 census.

== History ==
Greasley (then Griseleia) is mentioned in the Domesday Book as belonging to William Peverel and being worth ten shillings. The book includes reference to a church, a priest and woodland pasture. The present church of St Mary was built in the mid 15th century, and parts of the building were restored in 1753, 1772, 1832 and 1882. The nave and chancel were rebuilt in 1896, and there are 20th century vestries. The building is Grade II listed.

The remains of Greasley Castle, a medieval fortified manor house, have been incorporated into a range of farm buildings. To the north, on the edge of High Park Wood, are the remains of Beauvale Priory, founded in 1343, and one of only nine Carthusian monastic houses built in England. The prior and his predecessor were executed in 1535, following the passing of Henry VIII's Act of Succession, and the priory was dissolved in 1539. It was one of the first sites to be protected by its designation as a scheduled ancient monument on 10 April 1915, and in 1952, the buildings were individually given listed building protection. Nearby is Beauvale House, a small country house designed for Francis Cowper, 7th Earl Cowper by E. W. Godwin and constructed in 1871–73. It includes a service wing and stables, and is a grade II* listed structure.

To the west of the wood is Moorgreen Reservoir, built in 1794 to supply water for the Nottingham Canal, and still owned by the Canal & River Trust, as it now feeds the Erewash Canal. It is managed as a carp fishery by Greasley Estates, covers 38 acres (15 ha) and is up to 30 feet (9.1 m) deep in places. The local author D H Lawrence used it as a setting in two of his books, calling it Willey Water in Women in Love and Nethermere in The White Peacock.

== Notable people ==
- William Warburton, who later became the Bishop of Gloucester, was the vicar at Greasley from 1723 to 1725.
- John Barber, coalmaster and inventor, was born at Greasley Castle Farm and baptized in St Mary's on 22 October 1734.
- Mordecai Sherwin England and Notts cricketer was born here in 1851.

== See also ==
- Listed buildings in Greasley
