= Jack Bamford =

English George Cross recipient (1937–2023)

Jack Bamford GC
- Bamford circa 1953 showing his GC
- Born: John Bamford; 7 March 1937; Ilkeston, Derbyshire, England
- Died: 2 November 2023 (aged 86)
- Known for: Recipient of the George Cross
George Cross

John Bamford GC (7 March 1937 – 2 November 2023), known as Jack Bamford, was the youngest person at age 15 to have been directly awarded the George Cross, for rescuing his two younger brothers from their upstairs bedroom during a fire at their family home. His George Cross award was announced in December 1952. In March 1953, Bamford travelled to Buckingham Palace to receive his award from Queen Elizabeth.

Bamford lived quietly after his brief brush with fame, owning and operating a vehicle breakers business for over thirty years. He died on 2 November 2023 at the age of 86.

== Background ==
John Bamford was born in Ilkeston on 7 March 1937, the second of six children of John and Rachel Bamford. His father was a coal-miner, and Bamford quit school at age 15 to work alongside him at the Moorgreen Colliery, as a belt maintenance assistant.

On 19 October 1952, Bamford rescued his two younger brothers from their upstairs bedroom when a fire occurred during the night at their home in Newthorpe. He spent several weeks in an intensive care unit with severe burns to his face, neck, chest, stomach, back, arms and hands. His George Cross was announced on 16 December 1952, with Bamford receiving notification days earlier via a letter, while he was still in the hospital. On 10 March 1953, Bamford travelled to Buckingham Palace to receive his award from Queen Elizabeth.

In 1959, he moved to Awsworth, where he owned and operated a vehicle breakers business. Upon his retirement in 1993, he then moved to Land's End. In 2011, he loaned his award to be put on display at the Imperial War Museum in London, quoted in the Nottingham Post, as saying: "It is better on display there than being hidden away." In 2022, he was invited to the funeral of Queen Elizabeth. Bamford died on 2 November 2023, at the age of 86.

== Record loss ==
In 1971 the Albert Medal and Edward Medal became eligible for exchange for a GC, and Bamford lost his record as the youngest recipient to David Western, who had been awarded the Albert Medal in 1948 at the age of 11. Bamford remains the youngest recipient to be awarded the George Cross directly.

== Citation ==
A fire broke out in a house occupied by a man, his wife and six children, and in a very short time was burning fiercely. John and his father went downstairs and upon opening the living room door at the foot of the stairs the interior of the room burst into flames. Owing to the intense heat they were unable to get back upstairs to the rest of the family. They ran out through the front door, climbed on to the top of a bay window which gave access to a bedroom, opened the window and helped three of the children and the mother on to the flat roof. John Bamford and his father then climbed into the bedroom where they could hear the two remaining children, aged 4 and 6, shouting in the back bedroom, situated immediately above the seat of the fire. The bedroom doors at the head of the stairs were enveloped by flames. The father draped a blanket around himself and attempted to reach the children but the blanket caught fire and he was driven back. John Bamford then told his father to go to the back of the house while he got down on his hands and knees and crawled through the flames into the bedroom.

His shirt was completely burned upon him but nevertheless he snatched the two young boys from the bed and managed to get them to the window. He dropped the younger boy from the window into his father's arms but the elder boy struggled from his grasp. Bamford could then have got out himself but he left the window and chased the screaming child through the flames across the room. He eventually managed to catch him and throw him from the window.

By this time John Bamford was fast losing consciousness. He was terribly burned on the face, neck, chest, back, arms and hands but he managed to get one leg over the window sill and then fell to the ground.

John Bamford displayed courage of the highest order, and in spite of excruciating pain succeeded in rescuing his two brothers.

== Honours ==
Country	Date	Appointment	Ribbon	Post-nominal letters	Notes
United Kingdom	December 1952	George Cross		GC	
United Kingdom	2 June 1953	Queen Elizabeth II Coronation Medal			
United Kingdom	6 February 1977	Queen Elizabeth II Silver Jubilee Medal			
United Kingdom	6 February 2002	Queen Elizabeth II Golden Jubilee Medal			
United Kingdom	6 February 2012	Queen Elizabeth II Diamond Jubilee Medal			
United Kingdom	6 February 2022:	Queen Elizabeth II Platinum Jubilee Medal			
United Kingdom	6 May 2023	King Charles III Coronation Medal			

== See also ==
- Orders, decorations, and medals of the Commonwealth realms
- List of George Cross recipients
