= Eastwood, Nottinghamshire =

Town and civil parish in Nottinghamshire, England

Coordinates: 53.018°N 1.304°W

Eastwood
- Town and civil parish
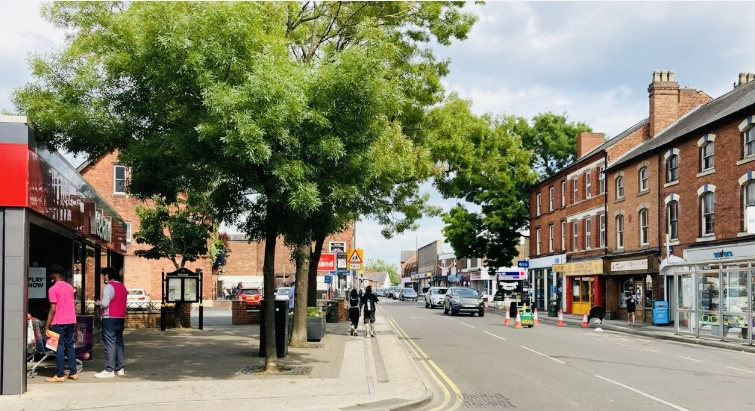
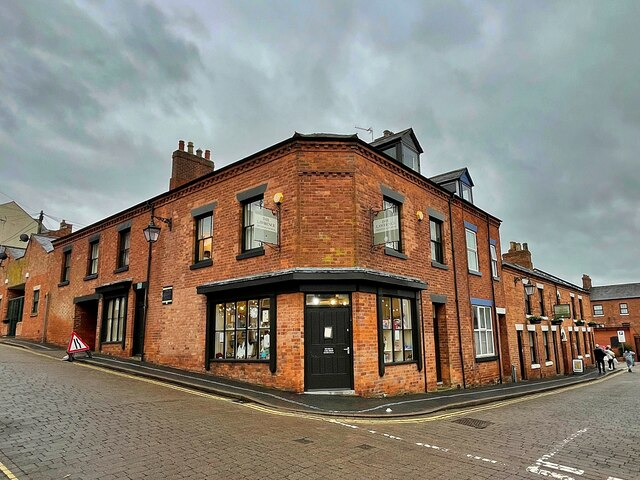
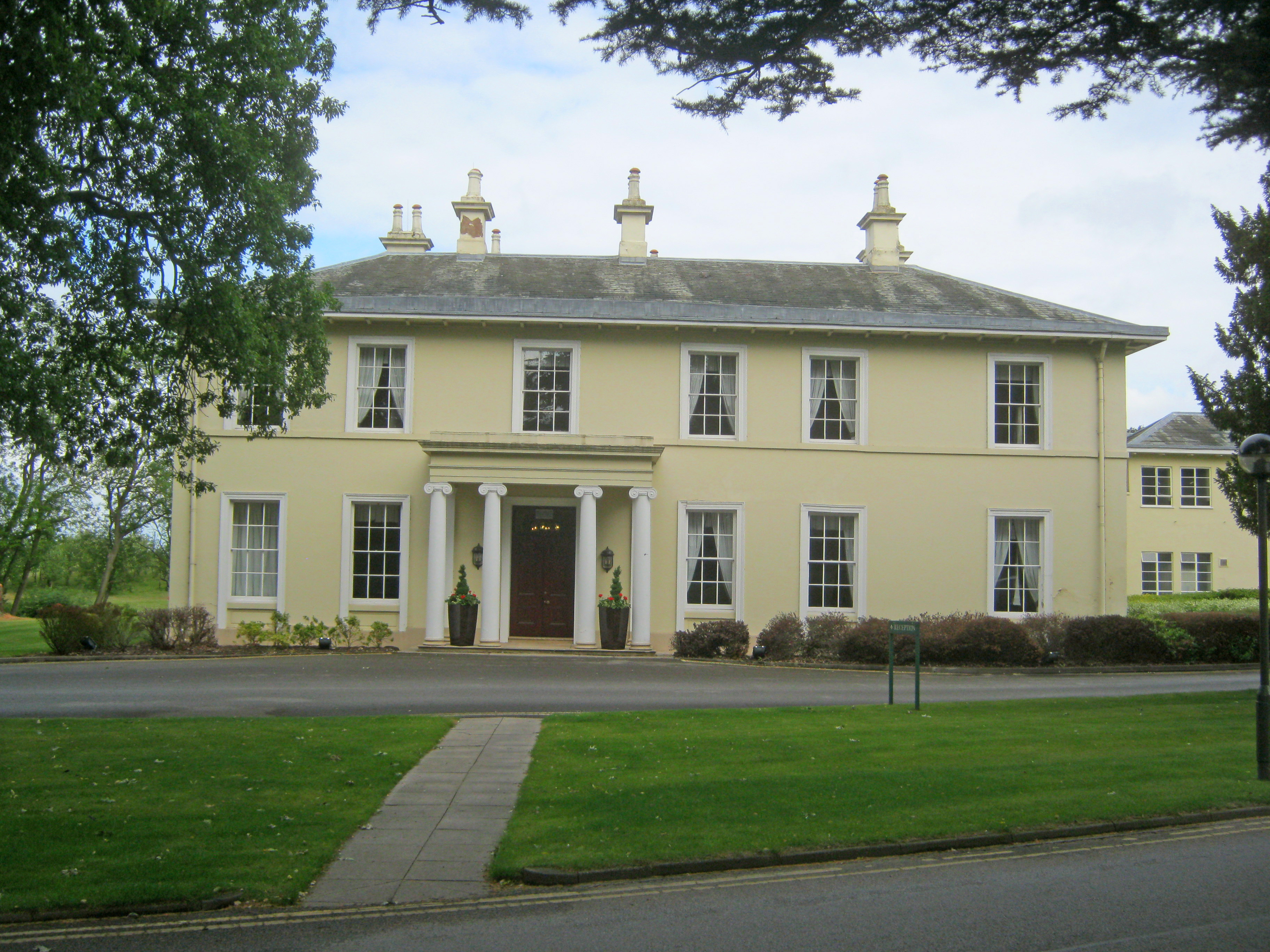
- Town Centre DH Lawrence Museum Eastwood Hall

- Location within Nottinghamshire
- Interactive map of Eastwood
- Area: 1.61 sq mi (4.2 km^{2})
- Population: 10,927 (2021 - civil parish)
  - Density: 6,787/sq mi (2,620/km^{2})
- OS grid reference: SK 46684 47005
  - London: 116 mi (187 km) SSE
- District: Borough of Broxtowe
- Shire county: Nottinghamshire
- Region: East Midlands
- Country: England
- Sovereign state: United Kingdom
- Areas of the town: List: Civil parish: Town centre, Hill top, New Eastwood, Newthorpe Common; External suburbs: Beauvale, Giltbrook, Greasley, Moorgreen, Newthorpe
- Post town: NOTTINGHAM
- Postcode district: NG16
- Dialling code: 01773
- Police: Nottinghamshire
- Fire: Nottinghamshire
- Ambulance: East Midlands
- UK Parliament: Broxtowe
- Website: www.eastwood-tc.gov.uk

Eastwood is a town and civil parish in the Broxtowe district of Nottinghamshire, England, 9 miles (14 km) northwest of Nottingham. Mentioned in Domesday Book, it expanded rapidly during the Industrial Revolution. The Midland Railway was formed here and it is the birthplace of D. H. Lawrence.

== History ==
"Eastwood" is a hybrid place-name, formed from Old English Est, for "East", and Old Norse Þveit /ˈθweɪt/, for "meadow", "cleared meadow", or "clearing in a wood." This is a common element in English place-names, often found as "Thwaite". "Eastwood" might mean eastern clearing, possibly originating as a Viking-age clearing in Sherwood Forest.

There is some evidence to suggest that the land around Eastwood was occupied in the Middle and Late Palǣolithic periods.

The location of the settlement is due primarily to the availability of rich agricultural land, the proximity of the River Erewash and—most importantly—the extensive and easily mined coal deposits. It is mentioned in Domesday Book as Estewic, part of the fee of William Peverel:

In Estewic [Ulfketel] had 4 bovates of land [assessed] to the geld. [There is] land [...] It is waste. William [Peverel] has the custody of it. [There is] woodland pasture 3 furlongs long and 3 broad. In King Edward's time it was worth 5 shillings.

— Domesday Book

During The Anarchy, the 12th century civil war between Stephen of Blois and supporters of Matilde, the mother of the eventual king, Henry II, Peveral's son, William Peverel the Younger, forfeited these to the Crown in 1155. The estate, called the Peverel Honour, was eventually divided, and much of the land around Eastwood was granted to the Greys of Codnor Castle.

Tenant farming prevailed throughout the Middle Ages, whilst common pasture was mainly used for grazing.

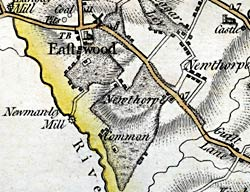
From John Chapan's map of Nottinghamshire, published in 1774

When King James VI of Scotland became King James I of England in 1603, Eastwood had a population of about 170, and it remained a small village until the 18th century when, in 1779, the Trent Navigation Company opened the Erewash Canal. This was one of the first man made waterways in England, with locks at Beeston linking Eastwood to the River Trent and Nottingham, and its arrival led to a rapid expansion of the local coal mining industry. Other industries soon followed, including framework knitting, corn milling, pottery, brewing, rope making and brick making.

The town expanded rapidly during the Industrial Revolution, and in the 19th century it experienced the greatest increase in population density of any parish in Nottinghamshire. By 1880 the population had increased to 4,500. Factories were built to accommodate the new industries, land becoming available for them as the rural population moved to urban areas. This industrialisation of the countryside was only restricted from the early 19th century, when, somewhat belatedly, the effect of the Enclosures began to be felt in Nottinghamshire. In a local manifestation of this period of upheaval, marchers of the Pentrich Revolution of 1817 passed through the town, and were met by soldiers at nearby Giltbrook: the residents of Eastwood boarded up their houses and hid in the woods.

In 1832, a historic meeting took place at the Sun Inn (built 1750), which resulted in the creation of the Midland Counties Railway, and the construction of a line from Pinxton to Leicester. Industrialisation continued with the opening in 1868 of Moorgreen Colliery, and in 1875 the demand for coal resulted in a railway station in Eastwood, with services to Nottingham on the Great Northern Railway.

D. H. Lawrence was born in Eastwood in 1885. Although the local area is mentioned in many of his novels, it is especially featured in The White Peacock, against a backdrop of industrialisation. There were ten coal mines, or "pits", within easy walking distance of Lawrence's home, and the overwhelming majority of the local male population were colliers. Although the coal boom ended during Lawrence's childhood, Eastwood continued to expand, Nottingham Road and its feeder streets became established as a shopping area, and in 1908 the local Urban District Council opened its offices. However, few jobs remained outside what remained of the coal industry. Most women were housewives, and boys were desperate to reach the age of fourteen, when they could start working in the mines. In the early 20th century, trams provided a new means of transport between Nottingham, Ripley and Heanor. Lawrence lived next to the line, and described it as the most dangerous tram service in England.

Eastwood coal, metal castings, rope, wire and agricultural products made valuable contributions to Britain's war effort during the two world wars. In the Second World War, Eastwood supplied soldiers to the Sherwood Foresters Regiment. A memorial on Nottingham Road commemorates Eastwood residents who gave their lives in both world wars.

In 1946, the coal industry was nationalised, and the new National Coal Board acquired Eastwood Hall as their Area Office. This later became their National Office, and served as the crisis meeting location during the national Miners' Strike of the 1980s, it is now a hotel. At the height of its production in 1963, Moorgreen Colliery alone produced one million tons of coal, but the last coal mine in the area closed in 1985.

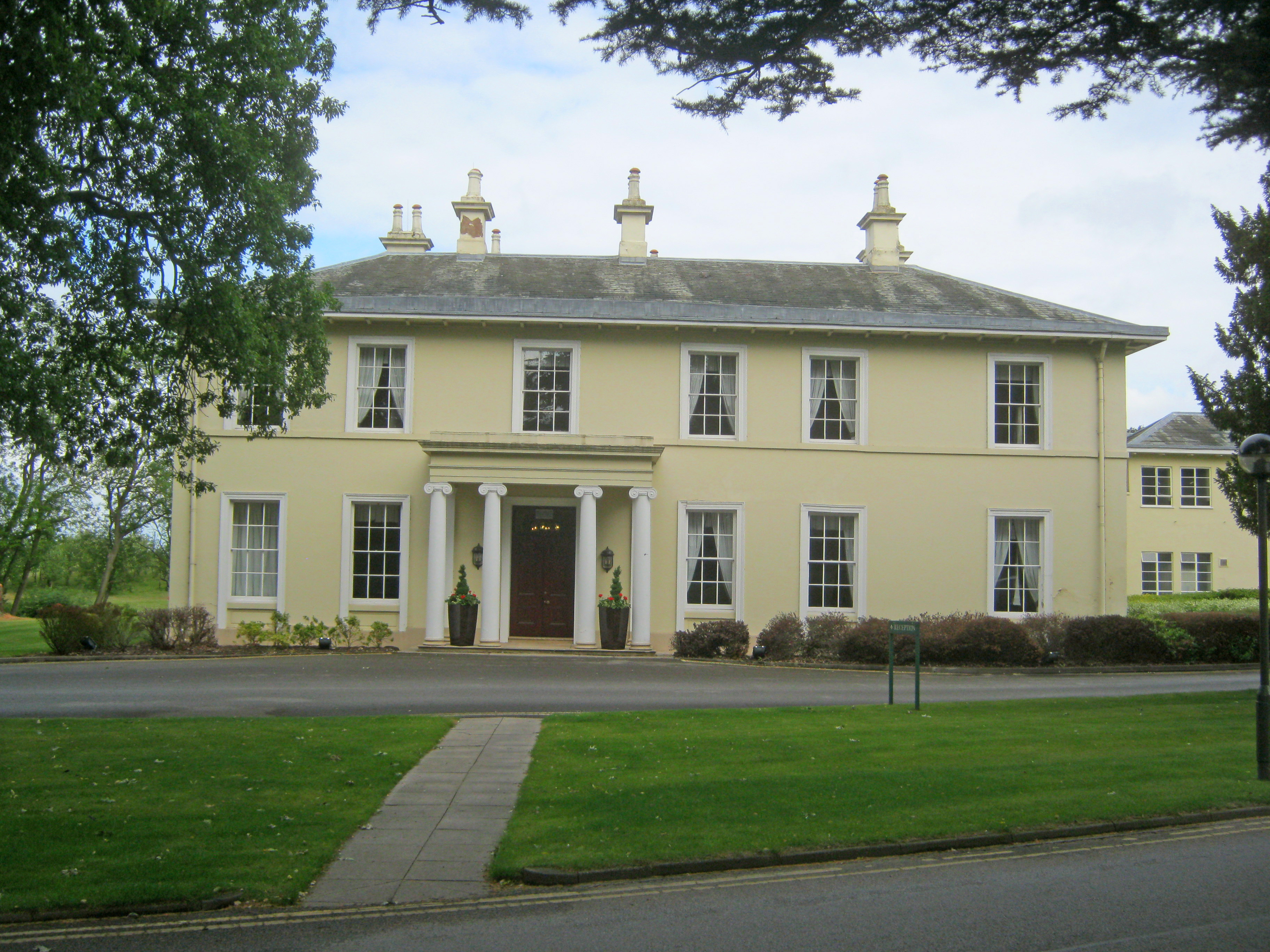
Eastwood Hall

In recent years, tourism has become increasingly important. Lawrence's birthplace is now a museum, and a painted line on the pavement, called the "Blue Line Trail," guides visitors around eleven sites of local interest including three of Lawrence's homes. The trail was the first of its kind in England, the concept being based on the Freedom Trail in Boston, United States.

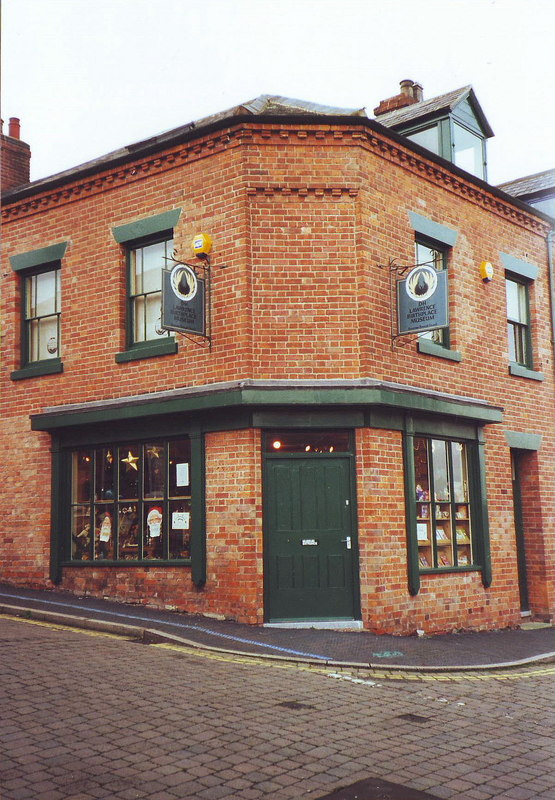
D. H. Lawrence Birthplace Museum, Eastwood

== Governance ==
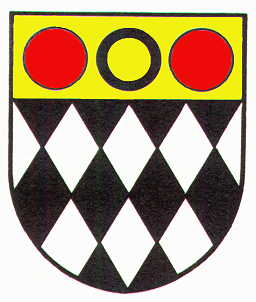
Coat of arms of the former Eastwood urban District Council. The black diamonds represent coal mining, the annulet is from the heraldry of the Plumtree family and the red roundels are from the arms of the Grey family of Codnor.

The Urban District Council for Eastwood became part of Broxtowe District Council in 1974. In 1977 the council was granted "borough" status, becoming the Borough of Broxtowe. The current mayor is Jackie Williams.

=== Local government ===
Two-tier local authority services in Broxtowe are provided by the Broxtowe Borough Council and Nottinghamshire County Council.

Broxtowe Borough Council currently has 44 councillors, representing 21 wards, each returning one, two, or three councillors, according to the population size of the ward.

Since boundary changes in 2015, the wards have been named:

- Eastwood Hall (electing 1 councillor)
- Eastwood Hill Top (2 councillors)
- Eastwood St Mary's (2 councillors)
- Greasley

=== Parliamentary constituencies ===
Eastwood is part of the Broxtowe constituency. The current MP is Juliet Campbell, who was elected in 2024.

=== Parish councils ===
Parish councils include Eastwood Town Council and Greasley Council.

== Geography ==
Surrounded by gently rolling countryside, Eastwood is 8 miles to the northwest of the City of Nottingham in Nottinghamshire and close to the county boundary with Derbyshire.

...I was born nearly forty-four-year ago, in Eastwood, a mining village of some three thousand souls about eight miles from Nottingham, and one mile from the small stream, the Erewash, which divides Nottinghamshire from Derbyshire. It is hilly country, looking west to Crich and towards Matlock, sixteen miles away and east and northeast towards Mansfield and the Sherwood Forest district. To me it seemed, and still seems an extremely beautiful countryside, just between the red sandstone and oak trees of Nottingham and the cold limestone, the ash trees, the stone fences of Derbyshire

— D.H. Lawrence, 1929 Nottingham & the Mining Country

The area contains coal measures, with shale, mudstone, and sandstone, overlain by yellow clay. Alluvial deposits from the River Erewash run roughly north–south.

The town is centred on Nottingham Road, which runs along a north west-south east ridge. This road contains many shops, uphill to the east, it leads to the A610 to Nottingham, the M1 motorway, and Giltbrook Retail Park, which is home to a large IKEA store, and various projected developments (see Future plans). At the western end of Eastwood is a gyratory system, consisting of an ancient crossroads converted into a traffic island, around the Sun Inn public house. A large Morrisons supermarket is here, and roads lead from the gyratory system north to Brinsley, west to Heanor, and south through Church Street, the location of several listed buildings, into New Eastwood.

The town is still surrounded by farmed land, woods and fields, and just half a mile (1 km) to the west, the River Erewash forms the boundary between Nottinghamshire and Derbyshire. Alongside the river, the Erewash Canal leads to the River Trent.

A large hill, visible when looking north from the town, is known locally as "dot hill", "dirt hill", or "bum hill." This land has been reclaimed from a former slag heap.

== Demography ==
At the 2001 UK census, the town of Eastwood including wards outside the core civil parish had a total population of 18,732.

Population change can be tracked accurately from the 1911 census until the 1971 census, as Eastwood Urban District was a Local Government District from 1896 until 1974.

Eastwood – population trend, 1911 to 1971

Population growth in Eastwood since 1911
Year	1911	1921	1931	1939	1951	1961	1971
Population	4,692	5,069	5,360	8,581	9,894	10,607	10,856
Source:A Vision of Britain through Time

In the 1951 census, approximately 11.5% of the total population listed their occupation as Mining & Quarrying. By the 2001 survey, this had fallen to 0.15%.

In the 2001 census, over 98% of the population selected the ethnicity White: British. The national average for England was 87%.

At the 2011 census the civil parish population was 10,695 and this increased to 10,927 residents for the 2021 census.

== Landmarks ==
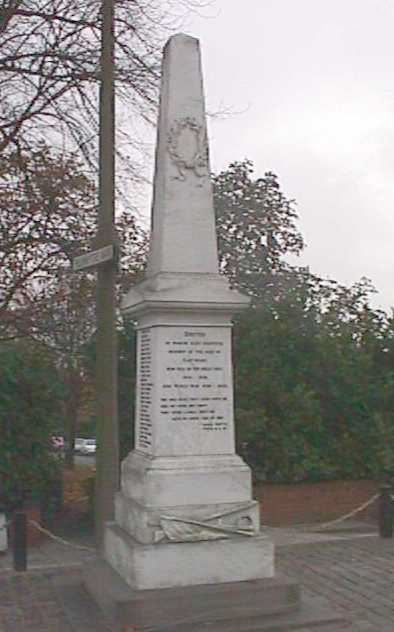
Eastwood War Memorial

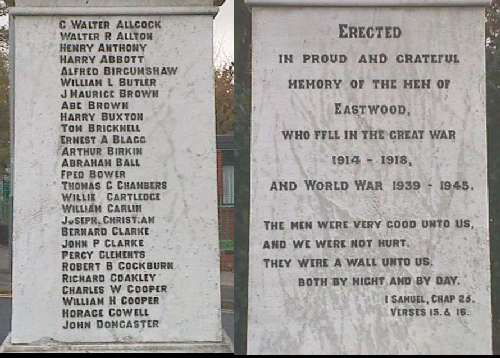
Inscription on War Memorial

The Buildings is a housing estate, consisting of some 300 terraced miners' cottages, built in the 1860s. They were saved from demolition by a council scheme, which won an EEC habitat award in 1977. It was also used to illustrate the European Community's Urban Renaissance competition in 1980.

Colliers' Wood is a 14 hectare community woodland, part of the Greenwood Community Forest, created in 1996/97 to reclaim some of the woodland and fields destroyed by the mining developments. Over 17,500 trees and hedgerows were planted, and two ponds created. The footpath is made from reclaimed shale. Habitats cater to a wide variety of birds, including mute swans, goldfinches, lesser redpoll, skylarks, and willow warblers.

A war memorial was unveiled in 1921, inscribed "to the men of Eastwood, who fell in the Great War 1914–1918." Later, World War II dedications were added, and it was moved to its present location at Plumptre Way. It is in the shape of an obelisk, made of Italian marble with a base of Whatstandwell stone. The Library, opened in 1975, includes an extensive collection of books by and about D H Lawrence. Also on view is Lawrence's desk, and the headstone from his grave in Vence, France.

Greasley Castle (c. 1341) was founded by Nicholas de Cantilupe. The remains are now covered by Greasley Castle Farmhouse (c. 1800), which incorporates fragments of medieval masonry.

The Blue Line Trail – painted along the pavement – guides visitors around the areas connected with the author D.H. Lawrence and include the D.H. Lawrence Birthplace Museum, established as a working class Victorian House, Durban House Heritage Centre with Lawrence exhibition, The Rocking Horse Bistro and art gallery all now closed and the three other houses in which Lawrence lived.

Eastwood Hall was the headquarters of British Coal. It is now a hotel and conference centre.

The Man in Space public house was built in the 1960s. It appeared briefly in the film Carry on at Your Convenience. But has since closed and been converted to a Sainsbury's Local. Since 27 November 2020 it has been and still is a co-op store

== Transport ==
The M1 motorway runs close to Eastwood (junctions 26 and 27).

Eastwood is served by the operators Trent Barton and Nottingham County Council. In the past, it has been served by A&S Coaches, Centrebus & Notts + Derby

The current routes are as follows:

- 33: Ilkeston – Heanor – Eastwood – Kirkby – Sutton – Mansfield (Trent Barton)
- 34: Ilkeston – Heanor – Eastwood – Kimberley – Hucknall (Trent Barton)
- Rainbow One: Nottingham – Kimberley – Eastwood – Heanor and Ripley or Jacksdale/Selston and Alfreton (Trent Barton)
- 532: Eastwood – Moorgreen – Selston (Notts County Council)
- 535: Eastwood circular (Notts County Council)

Journeys to Nottingham on the Rainbow One take 40 mins. Journeys to Hucknall on the 34 take 30 mins.

The nearest railway station is at Langley Mill, which has connections to Nottingham, Sheffield, Chesterfield and Manchester.

The East Midlands Airport is 13 miles away, 19 by road.

== Education ==
There are five primary schools in the area, including Florence Nightingale Academy, Greasley Beauvale Primary School (which D.H Lawrence attended), Lawrence View Primary School, The Priory Catholic Primary School and Springbank Academy (formerly known as Eastwood Infant and Junior School).

Most older local students attend Hall Park Academy which was formerly known as Eastwood Comprehensive School.

Eastwood Skills Shop offers courses including IT, Arts & Crafts, Spanish and Interior Design.

Eastwood Library, in the centre of the town, provides traditional book loans, but also has free internet access, CDRoms and a range of information services.

Eastwood Community Sports Centre has a four-court sports hall, and 2 junior and 2 full sized football pitches.

== Religious sites ==
St Mary's Parish Church has an open evangelical style of worship. There has been a church on the site since 1250, and there are some remains of the original structure. It was enlarged in 1826, largely replaced in 1858, and almost destroyed by fire in 1963. Only the tower remained; the rest of the present building was added in 1967, and consecrated on 25 September.

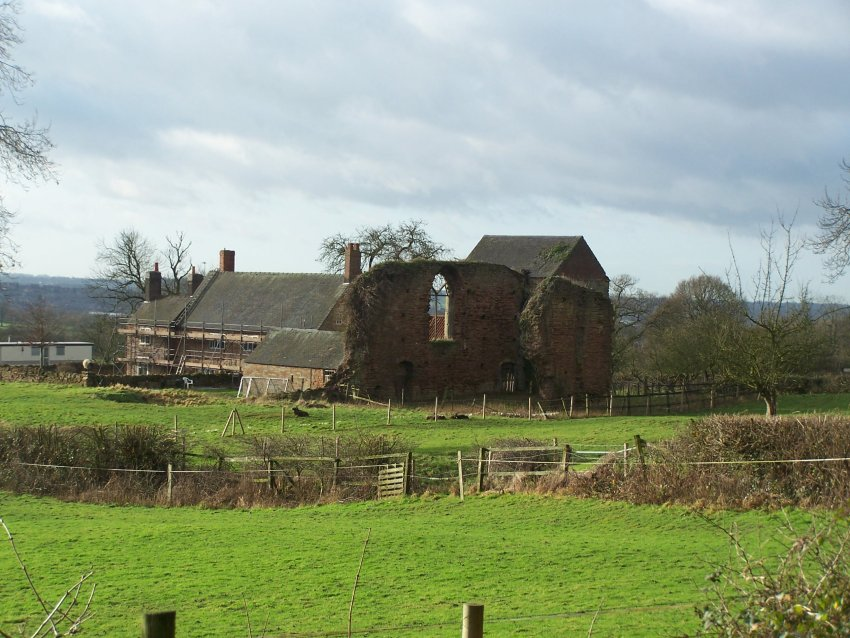
The remains of Beauvale Priory in 2007

Beauvale Priory was founded in 1343 by Nicholas de Cantelupe. One of nine Carthusian English houses which owed allegiance to the Grande Chartreuse, the monks' rules were similar to those of Benedictine Order. The monastery was suppressed in 1539, but it lives on in Lawrence's White Peacock as "the Abbey."

Other churches in the area include;

- Assemblies of God Church, Nottingham Rd
- Our Lady of Good Counsel RC Church, Nottingham Rd
- Church of Jesus Christ of Latter Day Saints, Derby Rd
- Eastwood Baptist Church, Percy St
- Eastwood Church of Christ, Seymour Road

== Sports ==
Non-league football club, Eastwood C.F.C. was founded in 2014 following the demise of Eastwood Town F.C. The club's first team currently play in the United Counties League Premier Division North at Coronation Park.

Eastwood Town Cricket Club plays in the Gunn & Moore South Notts League.

Nottinghamshire pool team play in the EPA county structure. Their home venue is Phoenix Cue Sports, Mansfield Road.

Eastwood Antz Basketball Club play at Eastwood Sports Centre, Mansfield Road

Eastwood Lawn Tennis Club has been established for well over 100 years at Church Walk and has multiple teams in the Nottinghamshire Leagues.

== Notable people ==
- D. H. Lawrence (11 September 1885 – 2 March 1930), author, was born in Eastwood. His birthplace and residences now attract visitors from all over the world. Many of his best-known novels describe Eastwood and its culture. Among his works are poems written in the local dialect.
- Jeffrey (Jeff) Astle (13 May 1942 – 19 January 2002), born in Eastwood, was an English footballer. He played for West Bromwich Albion and England.
- Tony Woodcock was born in Eastwood in 1955. He received 42 caps, scoring 16 goals for England, and won both the European Cup and the League Cup with Nottingham Forest in 1979.
- Several cricket players were born in the area, including Thomas Limb and William Rigley.
- William A. Pickering (9 June 1840 – 26 January 1907), the first Protector of the Chinese Straits settlement, also began life in Eastwood.

== Recent developments ==
The Giltbrook retail park, 1.5 miles (2.5 km) south-west of Eastwood, is a £70m shopping complex that opened on 14 October 2008. The site covers 240,000 square feet (22,000 m^{2}), of which 150,000 square feet (14,000 m^{2}) is retail alongside 80,000 square feet (7,400 m^{2}) of employment units. The site is dominated by a large IKEA store with 2,350 car parking spaces.

== Culture and community ==
Eastwood Collieries' Male Voice Choir formed in 1919. They appeared on BBC television in 1963, and are one of the oldest surviving colliery choirs in the United Kingdom.

Eastwood Arcadians are a local marching band.

The local newspaper is the Eastwood and Kimberley Advertiser.

Eastwood Theatre is home to local, national and international theatre. Its programme showcases dance, music and drama from professional and amateur performers.

== Arms ==
Coat of arms of Eastwood, Nottinghamshire

Crest
On a wreath Or and Gules in front of a wheel issuing therefrom Argent a rounded mount Sable lozengy Argent rising therefrom in its flames a phoenix Proper (granted 12 May 1980).
Escutcheon
Lozengy Argent and Sable on a chief Or an annulet of the second between two torteaux (granted 17 May 1951).
Motto
We Seek The Best

== See also ==
- Listed buildings in Eastwood, Nottinghamshire
