= Thomas Limb =

English cricketer

Personal information
- Born: 25 February 1850; Eastwood, Nottinghamshire, England
- Died: 21 February 1901 (aged 50); Eastwood, Nottinghamshire, England
- Batting: Right-handed
- Bowling: Right-arm medium

Domestic team information
- Years: Team
- 1878: Derbyshire
- Only FC: 13 June 1878 Derbyshire v Lancashire

Career statistics
Competition	First-class
Matches	1
Runs scored	0
Batting average	0
100s/50s	0/0
Top score	0
Catches/stumpings	0/–
- Source: CricketArchive, 25 January 2011

Thomas Limb (25 February 1850 – 21 February 1901) was an English cricketer who played for Derbyshire in 1878.

Limb was born Eastwood, Nottinghamshire and became a coal miner. He played in one match for Derbyshire in the 1878 season against Lancashire, in which he failed to score a run, being bowled out by Enoch Storer and Alexander Watson. He was a right-handed batsman and a right-arm round-arm bowler.

Limb died in Eastwood at the age of 50.
