= Moorgreen =

Settlement in England

- Hamlet
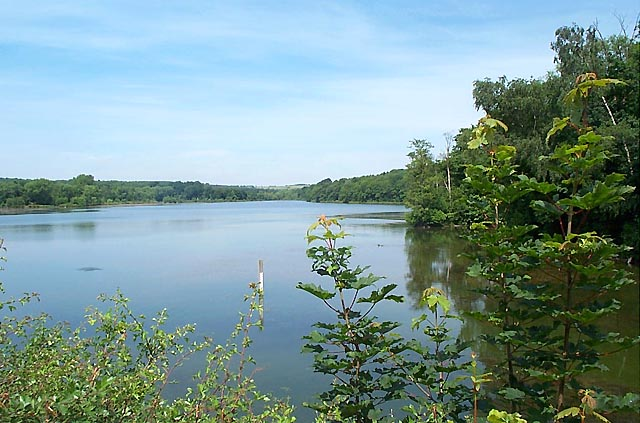
- Moorgreen reservoir

- Location within Nottinghamshire
- Interactive map of Moorgreen
- OS grid reference: SK 485475
- Civil parish: Greasley
- District: Borough of Broxtowe
- Shire county: Nottinghamshire
- Region: East Midlands
- Country: England
- Sovereign state: United Kingdom
- Post town: Nottingham
- Postcode district: NG16
- Dialling code: 01773
- Police: Nottinghamshire
- Fire: Nottinghamshire
- Ambulance: East Midlands
- UK Parliament: Broxtowe

Moorgreen is a hamlet in the Broxtowe district of Nottinghamshire, England. It is 115 miles (185 km) north west of London, 7 miles (11 km) north west of the city of Nottingham, and 1 1/4 miles (2 km) north east of the nearest town Eastwood. It is a linear settlement within the civil parish of Greasley.

== Geography ==
Moorgreen is surrounded by the following local areas:

- Felley and Underwood to the north
- Newthorpe and Beauvale to the south
- Greasley and Bogend to the east
- Eastwood to the west.

This area lies to the centre west of the parish, and its core is located where the lane named Moorgreen meets Church Road. It is a suburb of the town of Eastwood, and while primarily residential, is surrounded by farms and greenfield land. It extends to Moorgreen Reservoir north of the area and Moorgreen Industrial Park, which is a site for light and medium industry.

Around the built-up area, the land is approximately 88–112 metres (289–367 ft) with a nearby high point of 152 metres (499 ft) to the north west of the village.

== Governance ==
The settlement along with nearby others such as Beauvale and Newthorpe form part of the wider Eastwood built-up area.

However, Moorgreen and the wider countryside are combined as Greasley parish for administrative identity.

It is managed at the first level of public administration by Greasley Parish Council.

At district level, the wider area is managed by Broxtowe District Council.

Nottinghamshire County Council provides the highest level strategic services locally.

== History ==
=== Toponymy ===
The placename was formerly known as Greasley-Moor-Green, and was possibly singularly known as The Moor or The Green interchangeably, prior to the present combined spelling.

=== Medieval period ===
Moorgreen was part of the Greasley Castle estate, and possibly contained the home farm for it, with some probable villein tenements and a few labourers’ abodes, and it therefore was not mentioned separately in Domesday. In present times there is a “Manor House” which possibly was built on the site. The village was likely and invariably named the Moor, and the Green before the two were combined. In the 14th century at Kimberley Hugh de Cressy and his wife Cecilia, rented properties to the priory of nearby Beauvale, and in default of payment they would be entitled to seize the priory lands (among other places) at the Moorhouses, which probably by then was the name for Moorgreen.

The first instance of the name Moorgreen is in 1411, within borough records. The entry recorded that the lords of the manor of Greasley had set up a gate at Moorgreen, as a man who is described as “William of the Gate of Moorgreen” was sued at Nottingham for a breach of contract with the people of Cossall. The Moorhouses were therefore held by the de Cantilupe family. and there will have been a few cottars or bordars, in the local lord's employment. The Greasley manor eventually descended to the Earls of Essex, and from them into the Sutton family, eventually being sold to the House of Melbourne, with Sir Matthew Lamb purchasing the Greasley estate from the Sutton family in 1753. Lambclose, south of the reservoir, was at the time a farmhouse, and after some alterations and improvements was used as a hunting lodge. It forms part of the present Lambclose House, which the Barber family built, with Thomas Barber enlarging the house substantially.

=== Modern era ===
In the middle 1600s nonconformists worshipped at Moorgreen in an old barn, with the site later hosting a chapel, with a prior vicar of Greasley, Robert Smalley, helping to establish it in 1662. The building is now a private residence. The area by the turn of the 20th century, was in the ownership mainly of Earl Cowper, with the exception of two farms. The Earl was by this time, the lord of the manor at Greasley. Moorgreen colliery was some 1 km south of the house, and was opened in 1865, by the Barber Walker company, a shared business by the Barbers and the Walker family of nearby Eastwood Hall. The mine operated for 120 years until 1985. The Barber family eventually after the death of the Earl, purchased much of the locality, and continue to own land and farm locally, with holdings including the Moorgreen reservoir.

== Culture ==
Features of the area were referenced by the local Eastwood-born fiction author D. H. Lawrence in a number of his early 20th-century writings, including:

- Colliers Wood, the site of Moorgreen Colliery ('Minton Pit' in Sons & Lovers)
- Moorgreen Reservoir ('Willey Water' in Women in Love and 'Nethermere' in Sons & Lovers)
- Lamb Close House ('Highclose' in The White Peacock, 'Shortlands' in Women in Love and also in Sons and Lovers and Lady Chatterley's Lover)

== Economy ==
While much of the area surrounding the residential settlement is agricultural with nearby farms working the land, there is also the Moorgreen Industrial Park on Engine Lane to the north of the village, supporting small industry with premises and facilities.

== Landmarks ==
- Moorgreen Reservoir is a carp fishery, and built originally to feed the Nottingham Canal.
- Colliers Wood, established on the site of the former Moorgreen Colliery.

== See also ==
- Listed buildings in Greasley
