= Giltbrook =

Village in Nottinghamshire, England

Coordinates: 53.007°N 1.283°W

- Village
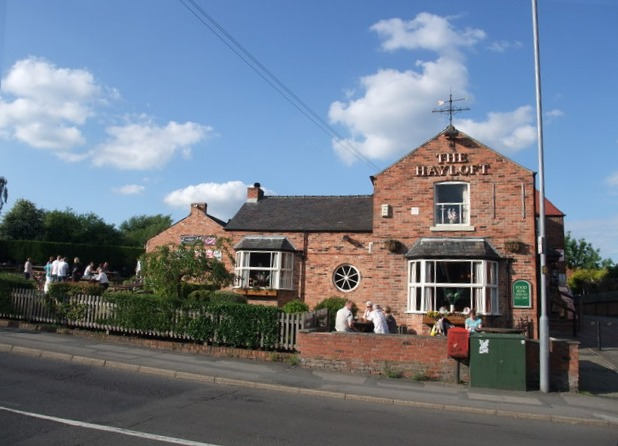
- The Hayloft

- Location within Nottinghamshire
- Population: 6,233 (2011)
- OS grid reference: SK 48105 45795
- Civil parish: Greasley
- District: Borough of Broxtowe
- Shire county: Nottinghamshire
- Region: East Midlands
- Country: England
- Sovereign state: United Kingdom
- Post town: NOTTINGHAM
- Postcode district: NG16
- Dialling code: 0115
- Police: Nottinghamshire
- Fire: Nottinghamshire
- Ambulance: East Midlands
- UK Parliament: Broxtowe

Giltbrook is a village in England situated approximately 6 miles (9.7 km) northwest of Nottingham and within close reach of junction 26 of the M1 motorway. It is part of Greasley (Giltbrook and Newthorpe) ward, which had a population of 6,076 in 2001, increasing to 6,233 at the 2011 Census.

The name Giltbrook is believed to come from the old English name "Gylden Broc", which means golden stream, or brook. This relates to the brook that runs from the fields to the north of IKEA, and then continues under Nottingham Road at Giltbrook, and under the IKEA entrance, finally flowing into the River Erewash. Notable events include Giltbrook being the end point of the Pentrich rising where a small force of soldiers: twenty men of the 15th Regiment of Light Dragoons ended the rising. Some streets have been named after the ring leaders, with names such as Brandreth, Turner and Ludlam being used.

The village is home to the Giltbrook Retail Park which has been developed due to the presence and popularity of IKEA, Decathlon and a Next store. In 2008 a whole retail park was built on the land next to IKEA. Other local businesses include the head office of Essentra Packaging, one pub, the Hayloft, a cob shop, a fish and chip shop, a hairdressers, a Chinese takeaway, carpet shop, plumbing shop and a garage. Giltbrook was previously home to the New White Bull public house which dated back to the turn of the 19th century. After failed attempts to save the pub, it closed on 7 January 2015 to make way for the development of a Co-operative Food store.

Giltbrook is represented on the Broxtowe Borough Council by three Conservative councillors, Nottinghamshire County Council by one independent councillor and the House of Commons by Labour MP Juliet Campbell.

One notable person who was born in Giltbrook was the undefeated bare knuckle fighter and boxer, Bartley Gorman, known as King of the Gypsies.
