= Brinsley =

Village and civil parish in Nottinghamshire, England

Coordinates: 53.0369°N 01.3128°W

- Village and civil parish
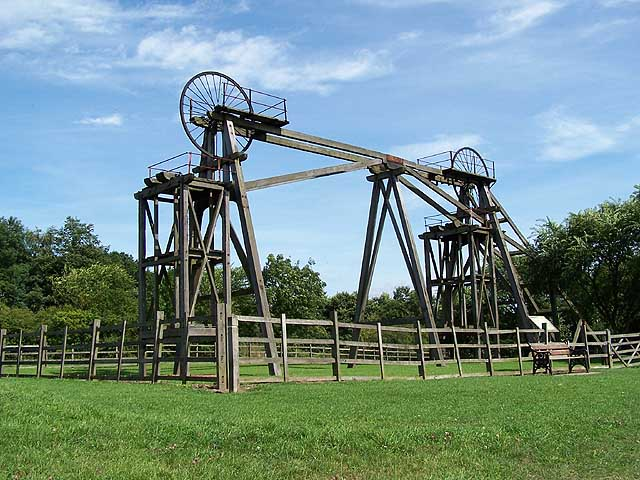
- Former headstocks prior to 2023 dismantling

- Location within Nottinghamshire
- Interactive map of Brinsley
- Area: 1.51 sq mi (3.9 km^{2})
- Population: 2,284 (2021)
  - Density: 1,513/sq mi (584/km^{2})
- OS grid reference: SK 462491
  - London: 115 mi (185 km) SSE
- District: Borough of Broxtowe, Ashfield
- Shire county: Nottinghamshire
- Region: East Midlands
- Country: England
- Sovereign state: United Kingdom
- Settlements: Old Brinsley (Broxtowe); New Brinsley (Ashfield)
- Post town: Nottingham
- Postcode district: NG16
- Dialling code: 01773
- Police: Nottinghamshire
- Fire: Nottinghamshire
- Ambulance: East Midlands
- UK Parliament: Broxtowe
- Website: brinsley-pc.gov.uk

Brinsley is a village and civil parish in Nottinghamshire, England. The church of St James was built in 1837–38 using Bunter sandstone from Mansfield quarries, the chancel being added in 1877.

The village is split into two sections, Old Brinsley which is within Broxtowe and New Brinsley which is in Ashfield. At the 2011 census the population of the parish was 2,327, dropping to 2,284 by the 2021 census.

The former headstocks were the last remaining examples of tandem, timber construction.

== 2007 Local Election ==
Brinsley elected Sadie Graham, a British National Party candidate in the 2007 Broxtowe council elections.

However, she was fired by the party for "...gross misconduct", and sat as an independent, until she was dismissed for failing to attend meetings.

== Brinsley Headstocks ==
Brinsley used to be a major farming village. The only remainder of this heritage are the headstocks. They are not only of significance for the area but are also the only headstocks left of this kind. After the final closure of Brinsley Pit they had been moved to a Park but have recently been restored and brought back to near their original place. The Friends of Brinsley Headstocks have worked on turning the area into a nature reserve. There are several farms in the area that have gone organic. The countryside is often explored by leisure walkers with walks organised by D.H. Lawrence Heritage.

=== 2023 removal of headstocks ===
In 2023, Broxtowe Borough Council dismantled and removed the headstocks using cranes, following a structural engineer's report earlier in the year concluding they were in dangerous condition. The area was already fenced-off, and the metal winding wheels had been removed in September 2023. The council's statement included: "Signs were erected on the site to inform residents of the situation and the Friends of Brinsley Headstocks were kept informed". As of December 2023, a public petition has been organised calling on Broxtowe Borough Council to "...Preserve and Restore Brinsley's Headstocks".

== Brinsley Carnival ==
Originated in the early 1900s as a hospital parade, where local farmers and growers would dress their carts, and sell produce to raise money to send the sick and injured in Brinsley to hospital. The Carnival evolved into a family day out, fete or gala over many years, with enforced gaps over the two world wars. It was restarted in 1960 by George Mills of Broad Lane in Brinsley, the local postmaster, and has continued to this day. Brinsley Carnival is traditionally held on Fathers day, at the recreation ground in Brinsley. It is organised by a group of volunteers who raise money at the carnival and throughout the year to finance the following years carnival and give away money to local good causes. For over 50 years Brinsley Carnival has offered a day's entertainment for families from the village and surrounding areas. But it has also given thousands of pounds to local causes. It is an event organised by the community, for the community. For some local organisations it provides their annual opportunity to raise awareness about their activities and to provide a welcome boost to their funds. The recipients of donations from Carnival proceeds are all either Brinsley based, or offer their services and membership to Brinsley residents.

== See also ==
- Listed buildings in Brinsley
