= Michael McIntyre (cricketer) =

English cricketer

Michael McIntyre (13 November 1839 – 9 October 1888) was an English first-class cricketer active 1863–64 who played for Nottinghamshire. He was born in Nottingham; died in Basford, Nottinghamshire.
