= Newthorpe, Nottinghamshire =

Village in Nottinghamshire, England

Coordinates: 53.01275°N 1.28452°W

Newthorpe is a village in the English county of Nottinghamshire. It is in the Broxtowe Borough Council ward of Greasley (Giltbrook and Newthorpe).

It forms part of the borough of Borough of Broxtowe being east of, and contiguous with, the town of Eastwood.

In 1952, at the age of 15 years, John Bamford became the youngest recipient of the George Cross for bravery during a house fire in Newthorpe.
