= Borough of Broxtowe =

Coordinates: 52.95°N 1.27°W

- Non-metropolitan district and borough
- Broxtowe
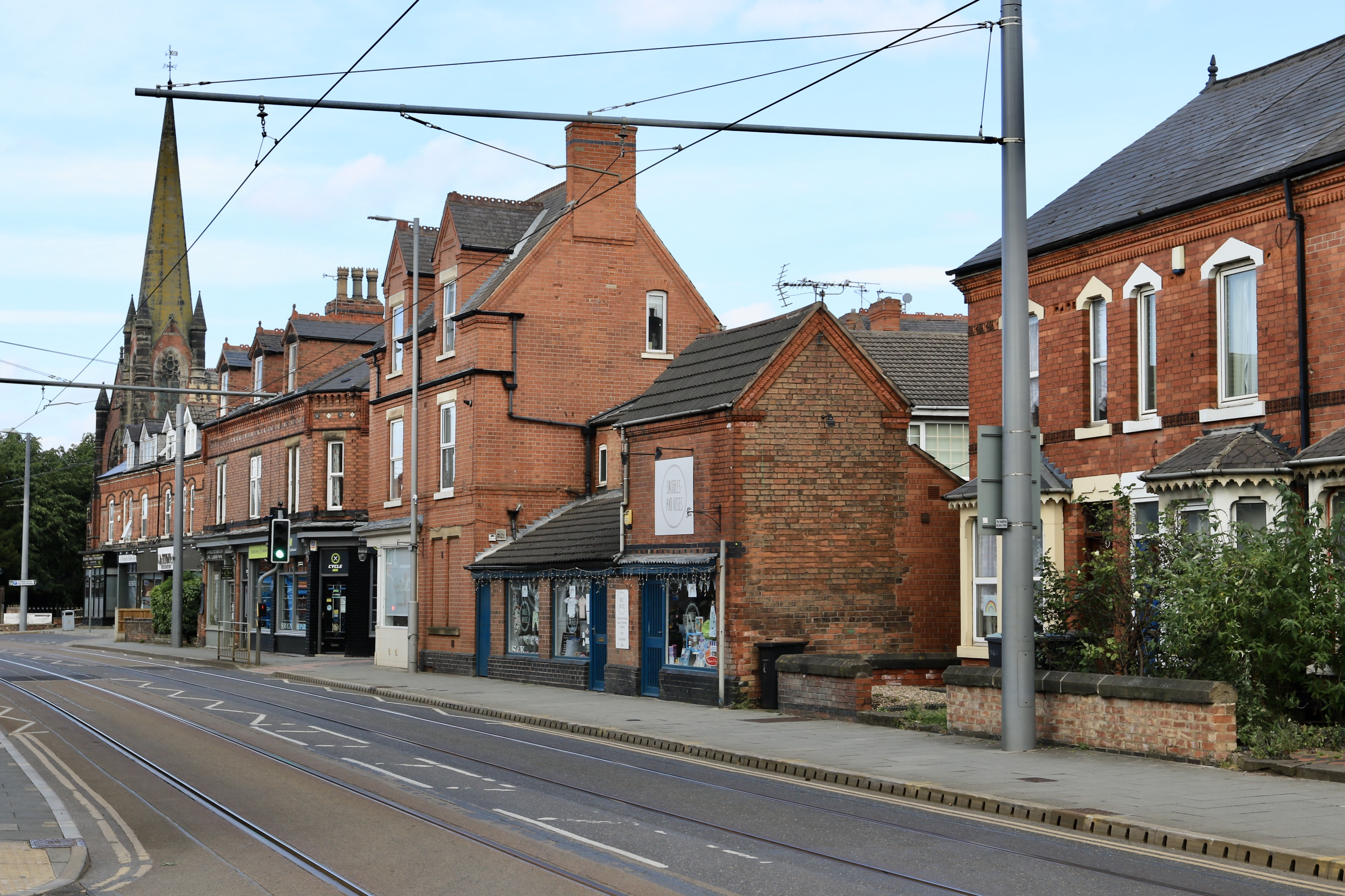
- Beeston, the largest settlement and administrative centre of the borough

- Shown within Nottinghamshire
- Sovereign state: United Kingdom
- Constituent country: England
- Region: East Midlands
- Administrative county: Nottinghamshire
- Founded: 1974
- Admin. HQ: Beeston

Government
  - Type: Borough Council (non-metropolitan district)
  - Leadership: Leader & Cabinet
  - Executive: No overall control
  - MPs: Juliet Campbell; Alex Norris

Area
  - Total: 31 sq mi (80 km^{2})
  - Rank: 214th

Population (2024)
  - Total: 114,565
  - Rank: Ranked 215th
  - Density: 3,700/sq mi (1,400/km^{2})

Ethnicity (2021)
  - Ethnic groups: List: 88.9% White; 5.5% Asian; 2.5% Mixed; 1.7% Black; 1.4% other

Religion (2021)
  - Religion: List: 49.7% no religion; 44.6% Christianity; 3.3% other; 2.4% Islam
- Time zone: UTC+0 (Greenwich Mean Time)
  - Summer (DST): UTC+1 (British Summer Time)
- ONS code: 37UD (ONS); E07000172 (GSS)

Broxtowe is a local government district with borough status in Nottinghamshire, England. It lies immediately west of the city of Nottingham, and most of the built-up areas of the borough form part of the Nottingham Urban Area. The council is based in Beeston and the borough also includes the towns of Eastwood, Kimberley and Stapleford and surrounding villages and rural areas.

The neighbouring districts are Ashfield, Nottingham, Rushcliffe, Erewash and Amber Valley.

== History ==
The district was formed on 1 April 1974 under the Local Government Act 1972. The new district covered the whole area of two former districts and part of a third, which were all abolished at the same time:

- Basford Rural District (part, being the parishes of Awsworth, Brinsley, Cossall, Greasley, Kimberley, Nuthall, Strelley and Trowell)
- Beeston and Stapleford Urban District
- Eastwood Urban District

The new district was named after the ancient Broxtowe Wapentake, which had covered a larger area. Despite the name, the district does not include the Broxtowe Estate, which is in Nottingham. The district was granted borough status in 1977, allowing the chair of the council to take the title of mayor.

Under current local government reorganisation plans, all district councils in Nottinghamshire, as well as the county council, will be abolished in 2028, with the district being split between a Nottinghamshire unitary authority and a Greater Nottingham unitary covering an area including and around Nottingham.

== Governance ==
Broxtowe Borough Council

Type
- Type: Non-metropolitan district

Leadership
- Mayor: Barbara Carr, Broxtowe Independent Group since 13 May 2026
- Leader: Milan Radulovic, Broxtowe Alliance since 15 May 2019
- Chief Executive: Zulfiqar Darr since September 2025

Structure
- Seats: 44 councillors
- Graph of the party split among 44 seats.
- Political groups: Administration (19) Broxtowe Alliance (19) Other parties (25) Conservative (10) Labour (7) Browtowe Ind. (5) Liberal Democrats (3)

Elections
- Voting system: First past the post
- Last election: 4 May 2023
- Next election: 6 May 2027

Meeting place
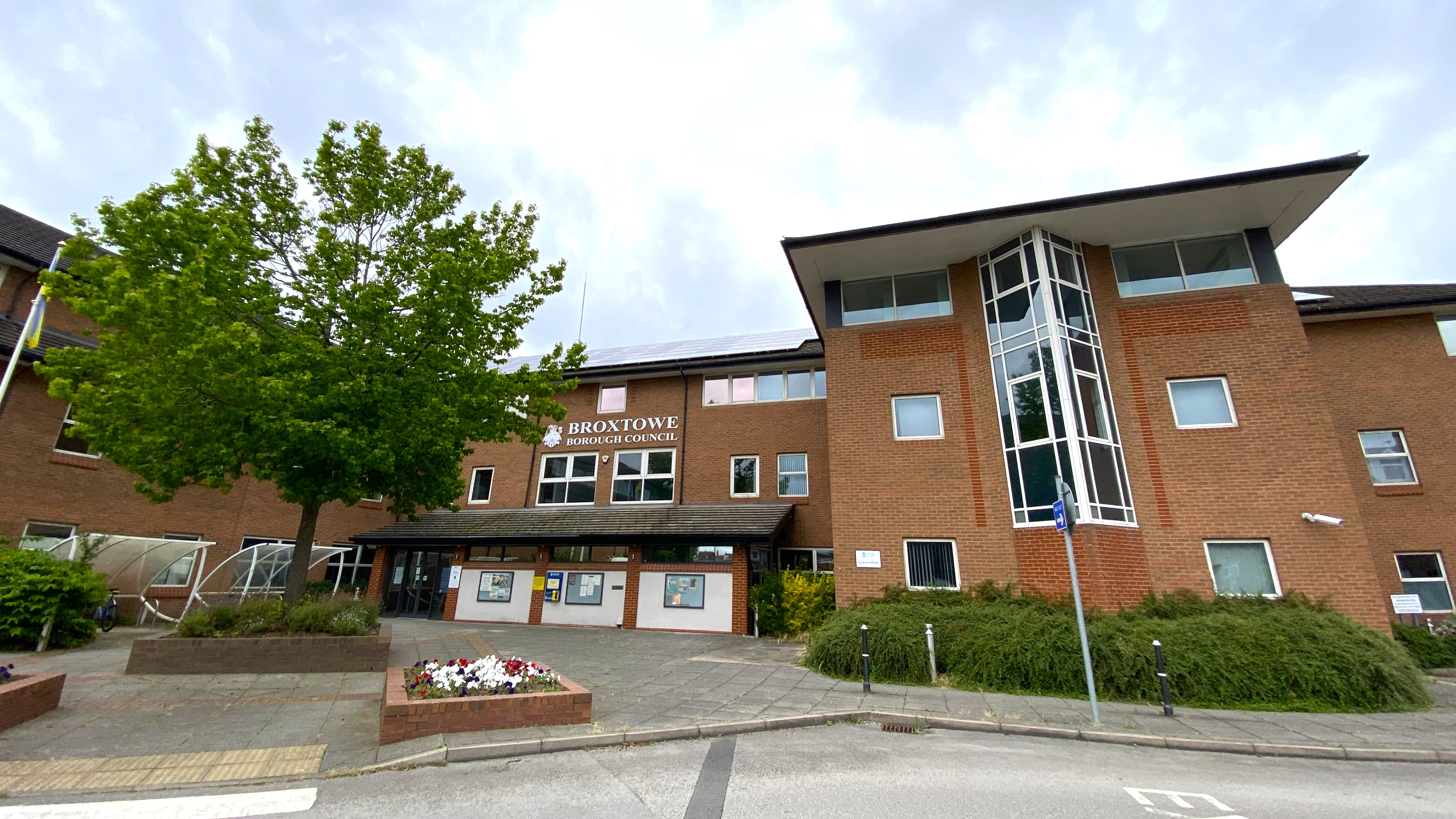
- Council Offices, Foster Avenue, Beeston, Nottingham, NG9 1AB

Website
- www.broxtowe.gov.uk

Broxtowe Borough Council provides district-level services. County-level services are provided by Nottinghamshire County Council. Parts of the district are also covered by civil parishes, which form a third tier of local government.

=== Political control ===
The council has been under no overall control since January 2025, when the majority of the Labour councillors, including the leader of the council, Milan Radulovic, left the party. They were the largest group on the council, and managed to form a minority administration. They initially formed a group called the Broxtowe Independents, which was subsequently registered as a formal political party called the Broxtowe Alliance in February 2025.

The first election to the council was held in 1973, initially operating as a shadow authority before coming into its powers on 1 April 1974. Political control of the council since 1974 has been as follows:

Party in control	Years
Conservative	1974–1995
Labour	1995–2003
No overall control	2003–2015
Conservative	2015–2019
No overall control	2019–2023
Labour	2023–2025
No overall control	2025–present

=== Leadership ===
The role of mayor is largely ceremonial in Broxtowe. Political leadership is instead provided by the leader of the council. The leaders since 1995 have been:

Councillor	Party	From	To
John Booth	Conservative		May 1995
Milan Radulovic	Labour	May 1995	2007
Michael Rich	Liberal Democrats	2007	12 May 2010
David Watts	Liberal Democrats	12 May 2010	2011
Milan Radulovic	Labour	18 May 2011	May 2015
Richard Jackson	Conservative	May 2015	May 2019
Milan Radulovic	Labour	15 May 2019	2 Jan 2025
Milan Radulovic	Broxtowe Alliance	2 Jan 2025	

=== Composition ===
Following the 2023 election, and changes of allegiance up to September 2026, the composition of the council was:

Party	Seats
Broxtowe Alliance	19
Conservative	10
Labour	7
Broxtowe Independent Group	5
Liberal Democrats	3
Total	44

The next election is due in 2027.

=== Premises ===
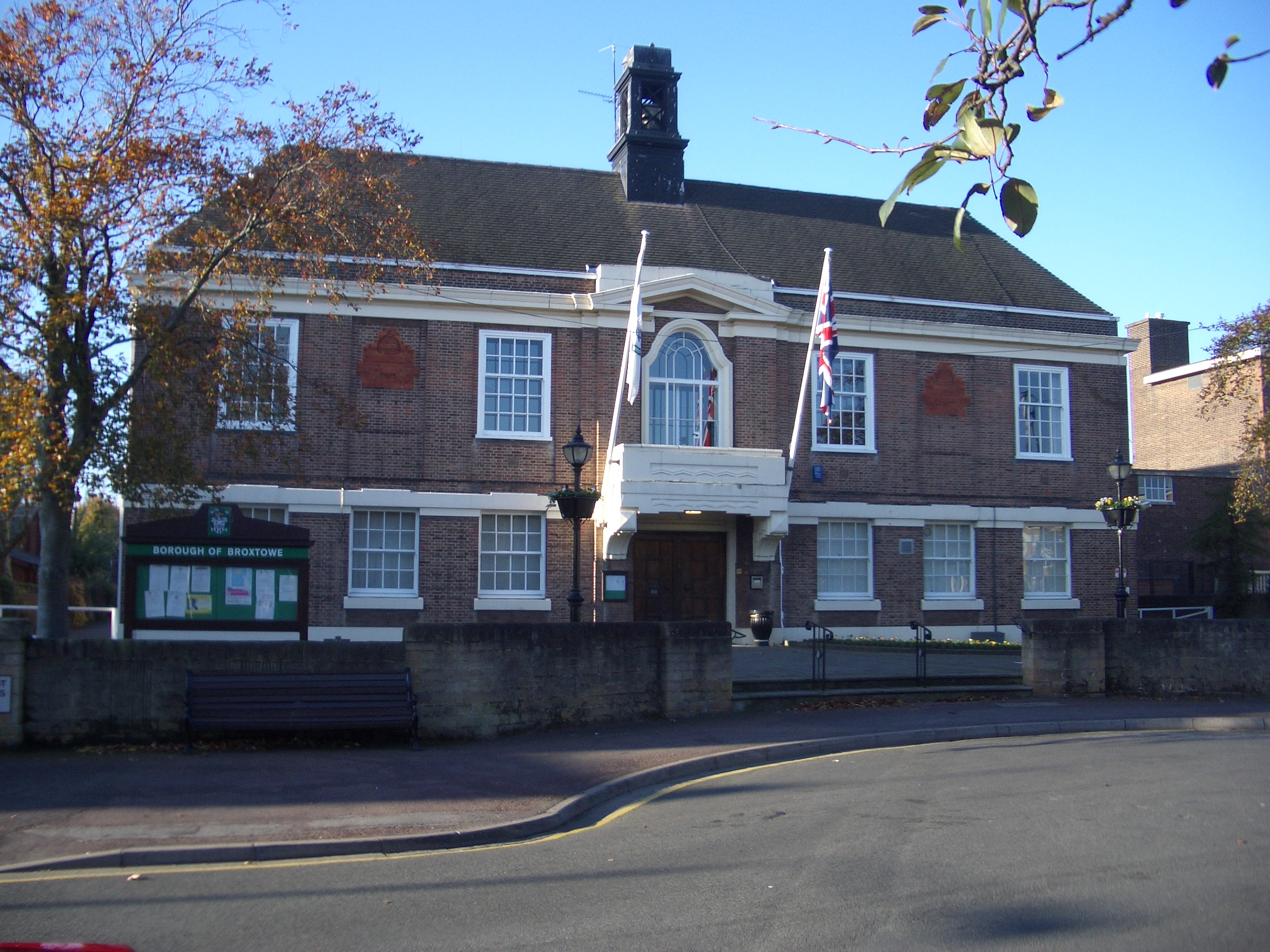
Beeston Town Hall was the council's headquarters until 1991

The council is based at the Council Offices on Foster Avenue in Beeston. The building was completed in 1991 at a cost of £2.7 million and was formally opened on 17 April 1991 by Andrew Buchanan, Lord Lieutenant of Nottinghamshire.

== Elections ==
Since the last full review of boundaries took effect in 2015, the council has comprised 44 councillors elected from 20 wards, with each ward electing one, two or three councillors.

=== Wards ===
The wards are:

- Attenborough and Chilwell East
- Awsworth, Cossall and Trowell
- Beeston Central
- Beeston North
- Beeston Rylands
- Beeston West
- Bramcote
- Brinsley
- Chilwell West
- Eastwood Hall
- Eastwood Hill Top
- Eastwood St Mary's
- Greasley
- Kimberley
- Nuthall East and Strelley
- Stapleford North
- Stapleford South East
- Stapleford South West
- Toton and Chilwell Meadows
- Watnall and Nuthall West

=== Parliamentary constituency ===
Since 1983 Broxtowe has also been the name of a parliamentary constituency. The constituency boundaries do not exactly match the borough boundaries, with some parts in the north of Broxtowe borough, including Eastwood and Brinsley, being in the Ashfield constituency.

A Broxtowe constituency also existed from 1918 to 1970. The area of the former constituency was very different, including Hucknall and Kirkby in Ashfield, but excluding Beeston.

== Settlements ==
Map of the Borough of Broxtowe

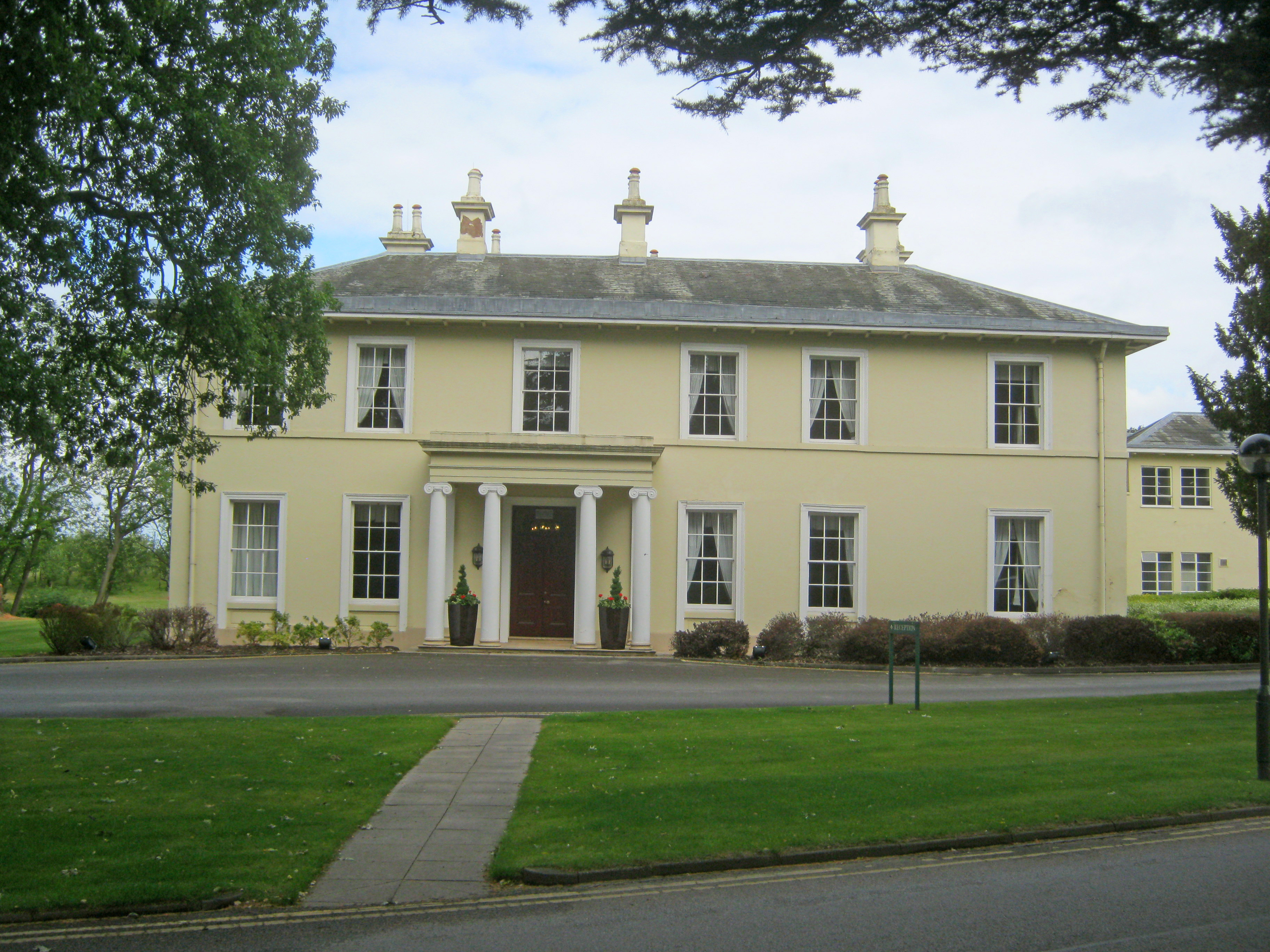
Eastwood, the second largest settlement in the borough

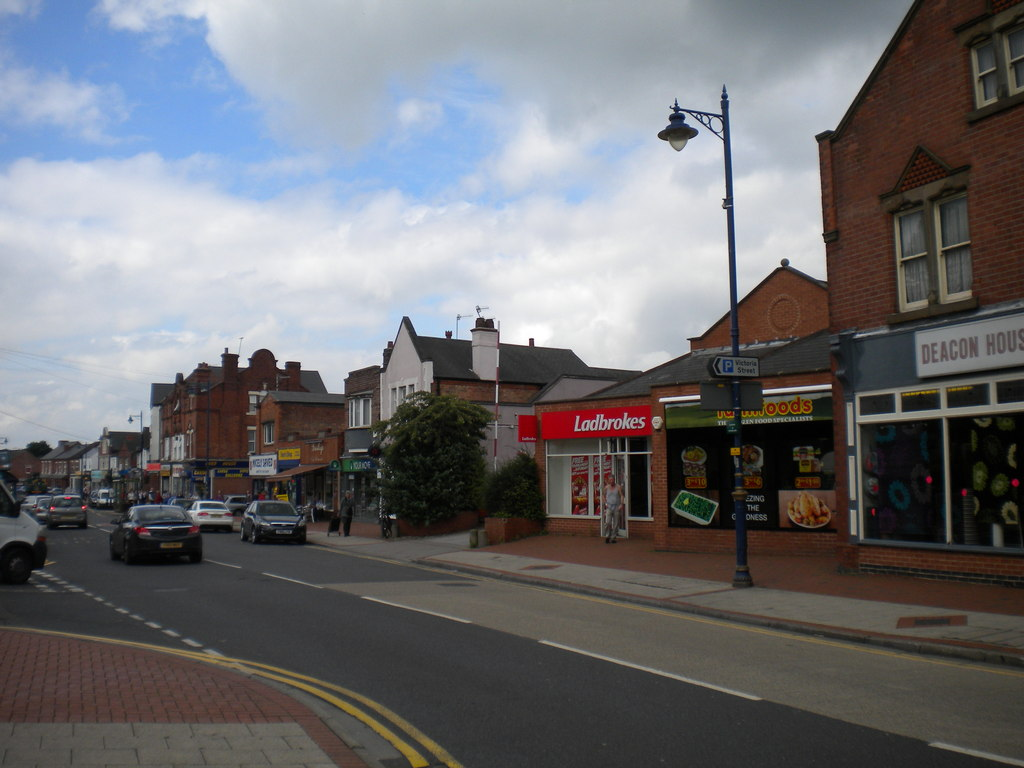
Stapleford, the third largest settlement in the borough

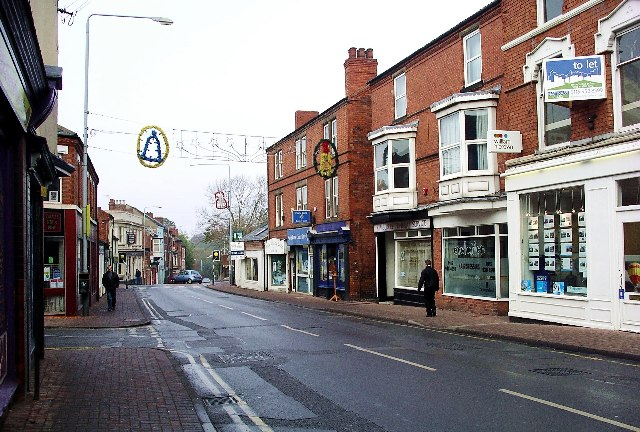
Kimberley, the fourth-largest settlement in the borough

Settlements include Beeston—where the council is based—Attenborough, Awsworth, Bramcote, Brinsley, Chilwell, Cossall, Eastwood, Giltbrook, Greasley, Kimberley, Moorgreen, Newthorpe, Nuthall, Stapleford, Strelley, Swingate, Toton, Trowell and Watnall. Additionally a small part of Wollaton falls within Broxtowe.

The Broxtowe Estate is not within the borough, but within the boundaries of the City of Nottingham.

=== Civil parishes ===
Broxtowe has nine civil parishes. The parish councils of Eastwood, Kimberley and Stapleford take the style "town council". An unparished area in the south of the borough covers the town of Beeston and the neighbouring places of Chilwell, Toton, Attenborough and Bramcote, being the area of the former Beeston and Stapleford Urban District minus Stapleford, which was parished in 1987. Strelley was abolished in 2023 and is presently also unparished. The parishes are:

- Awsworth
- Brinsley
- Cossall
- Eastwood (town)
- Greasley
- Kimberley (town)
- Nuthall
- Stapleford (town)
- Trowell

== Twinning ==
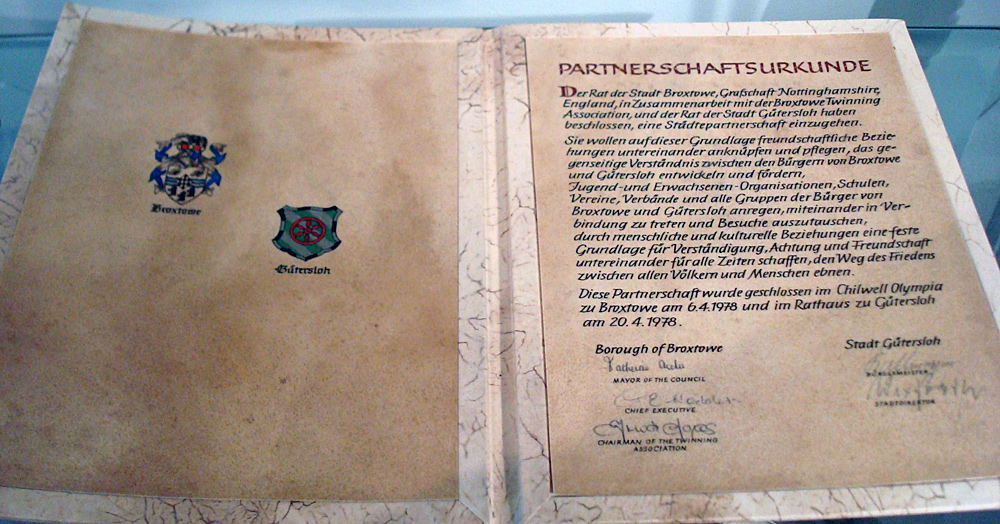
Town twinning with Gütersloh, Stadtmuseum Gütersloh

Broxtowe is twinned with Gütersloh in Germany.

== Local attractions ==
Broxtowe's main visitor attraction is the D.H. Lawrence Birthplace Museum in Eastwood. A small local attraction is the Hemlock Stone in Stapleford. Broxtowe is also the location of the Attenborough Nature Reserve rated as one of the most popular nature reserves in the UK. Its visitor centre was opened in March 2005 by David Attenborough, who can trace his family back to the village of Attenborough located to the east of the visitor centre.

== Local nature reserves ==
Broxtowe has 13 designated local nature reserves, namely Alexandrina Plantation (Bramcote), Bramcote Park Woodland (Bramcote), Brinsley Headstocks (Brinsley), Hall Om Wong (Kimberley), King George's Park (Bramcote), Nottingham Canal, Sandy Lane Public Open Space (Bramcote), Smithurst Meadows (Giltbrook), Stapleford Hill Woodland (Stapleford), Toton Fields (Toton), Watnall Spinney and Watnall Green (Watnall), and Colliers Wood (Moorgreen).

== Arms ==
Coat of arms of Borough of Broxtowe

Crest
On a wreath of the colours within a circlet composed alternately of bezants fimbriated Sable and torteaux a brock passant Proper.
Escutcheon
Argent three barrulets wavy Azure overall a lozenge lozengy Argent and Sable between in chief two bees volant in bend and in base three bears segant erect two and one Proper.

== Freedom of the Borough ==
The following people and military units have received the Freedom of the Borough of Broxtowe.

=== Individuals ===
- Professor Sir Martyn Poliakoff: 17 November 2022.

=== Military units ===
- 170 (Infrastructure Support) Engineer Group Royal Engineers: 2010.
