= Everist =

Everist is a surname. Notable people with the surname include:

- Frank Everist (1885–1945), English footballer
- Jon Everist, American video game composer
- Karlee Everist (born 1991), Canadian curler
- Kirk Everist (born 1967), American water polo player
- Mark Everist (born 1956), British music historian, critic and musicologist
- Robert Everist (born 1952), English businessman

== Other ==
- H.H. Everist House, a building in Sioux City, Iowa, US
- McGlashan Everist, an Australian architectural practice
