= St Mary's Church, Attenborough =

Church in Nottinghamshire, England

St. Mary's Church, Attenborough
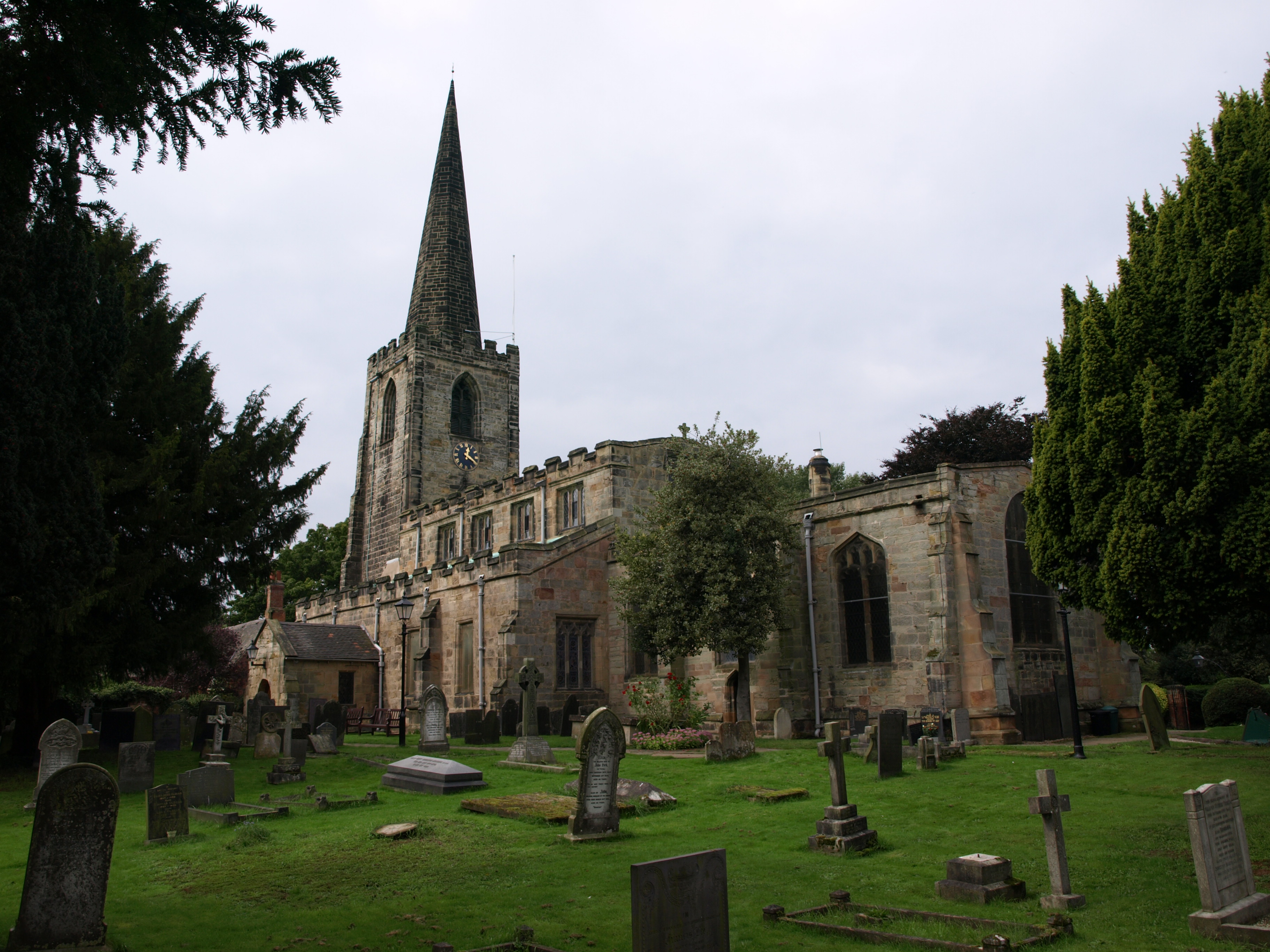
- St. Mary's Church, Attenborough
- St. Mary's Church, Attenborough
- 52°54′14.04″N 1°13′49.8″W
- Location: Attenborough
- Country: England
- Denomination: Church of England
- Churchmanship: Evangelical
- Website: www.attenboroughchurch.org.uk

History
- Dedication: Saint Mary

Specifications
- Height: 130 feet (40 m)

Administration
- Province: York
- Diocese: Southwell and Nottingham
- Archdeaconry: Nottingham
- Deanery: Nottingham South
- Parish: Attenborough

Clergy
- Vicar: Revd Toby Artis

St. Mary's Church, Attenborough is a parish church in the Church of England in the village of Attenborough, Nottinghamshire.

The church is Grade I listed by the Department for Digital, Culture, Media and Sport as a building of outstanding architectural or historic interest.

== History ==
The present day church consists of a medieval chancel with north vestry (now housing an organ) and south wall chancel door, clerestoried nave, north and south aisles, south porch, west tower and spire, and west-end vestries and galilee added in the 20th century. It is set within a conventional churchyard that is walled and gated on Church Lane (north side).

A chapel is said to have existed on the banks of the River Trent at Attenborough n 964 AD and was overbuilt with the stone chancel of the present day church. The chancel was thought to exist as early as 1042 and is recorded in the Domesday Book of 1086 where it is referred to as being shared by Chilwell and Toton. These two communities had formed at a distance on higher ground, probably as a result of the church being built on a gravel ridge adjacent to the river where there was little room for community expansion around it without the risk of frequent flooding of the homes. The boundary division of these two civil parishes divided the churchyard for many years.

The spire was rebuilt in 1848 and reaches a height of 130 feet (40 m). The church was restored in 1869 by the architect Richard Charles Sutton. The west end gallery was removed, and the belfry arch was opened up.

Until the 20th century, Attenborough was the ecclesiastical parish responsible for the souls of the Chilwell and Toton communities. Bramcote was also adjoined with Attenborough, the parish being known as Attenborough cum Bramcote. In 1903 a separate mission church, Christ Church, had been built at Chilwell, and in 1923, a daughter church, St Peter's, was built at Toton.

In 1957, a further mission church was built at the extremity of the rapidly developing area of Chilwell and was known as St. Barnabas Church, Inham Nook. Eventually, in 1967 Bramcote became a separate parish and Rev James Hamilton-Brown became its first vicar. Then in 1975 Chilwell was recognised as a parish in its own right and became Chilwell with Inham Nook. The first vicar of this newly formed parish was the Rev John Williams. At the same time in 1975 Attenborough became Attenborough with Toton and merited its own vicar; the first vicar being Rev Frank Beech who was previously the curate at Attenborough. A small amount of the old parish, which was situated South of the River Trent, was at this time transferred to Clifton. This arrangement continued until once more, due to population growth, it was necessary to divide Attenborough and Toton to form separate parishes. This division took effect from 1 May 2001 and Rev Peter Gibbs was to be re-licensed as vicar of Toton.

This development time-line is necessary to understand the complexities of the historical ecclesiastical parish of Attenborough, once known as the 'ABC Empire' (after a former UK cinema chain), otherwise, Attenborough, Bramcote and Chilwell with St Barnabas', Inham Nook, and St Peter's, Toton plus the Chilwell Garrison church on MOD land.

Henry Ireton, the son-in-law of Oliver Cromwell, was baptised here in 1611.

== Stained glass ==
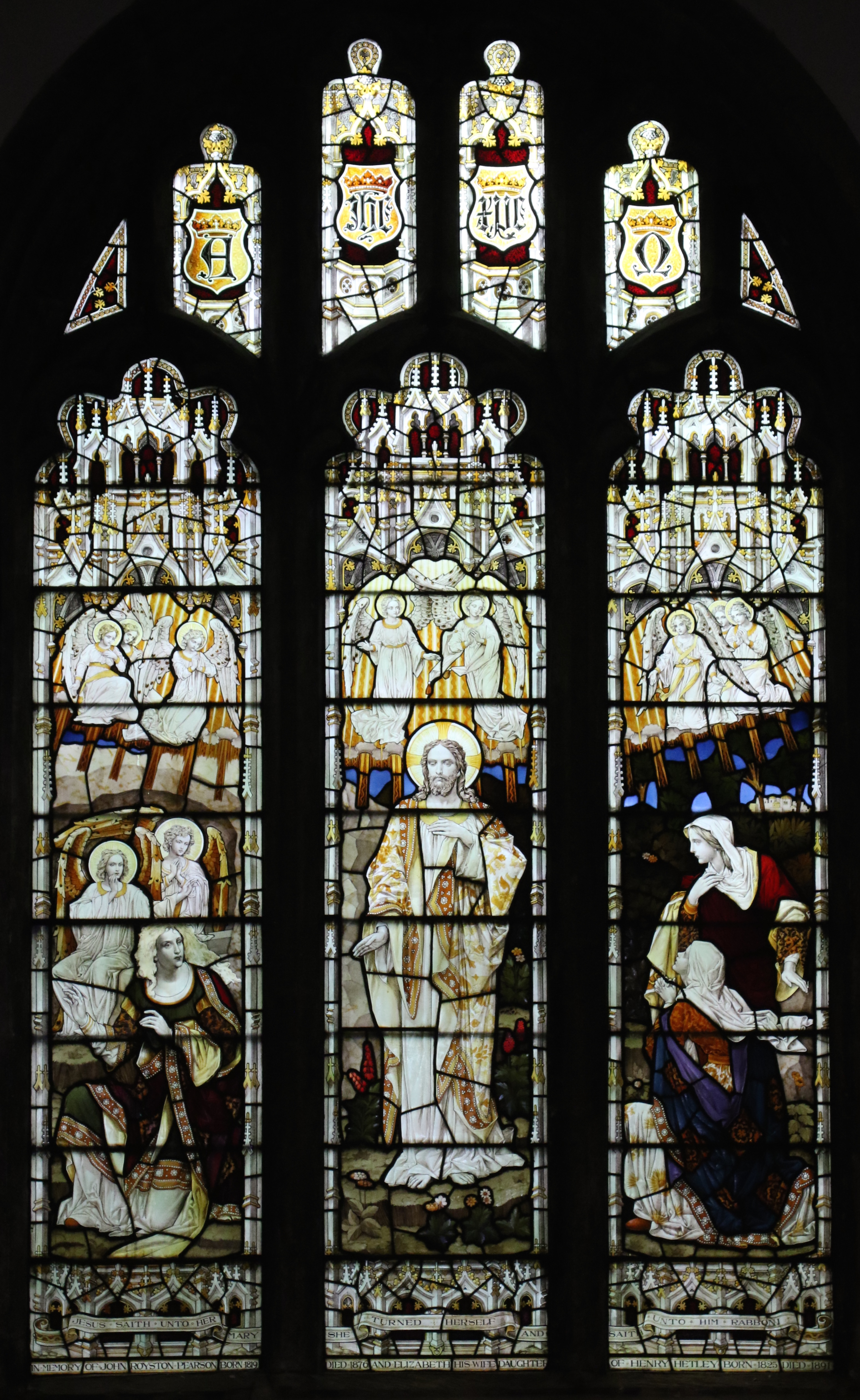
East window in memory of John Royston Pearson. By Ward and Hughes

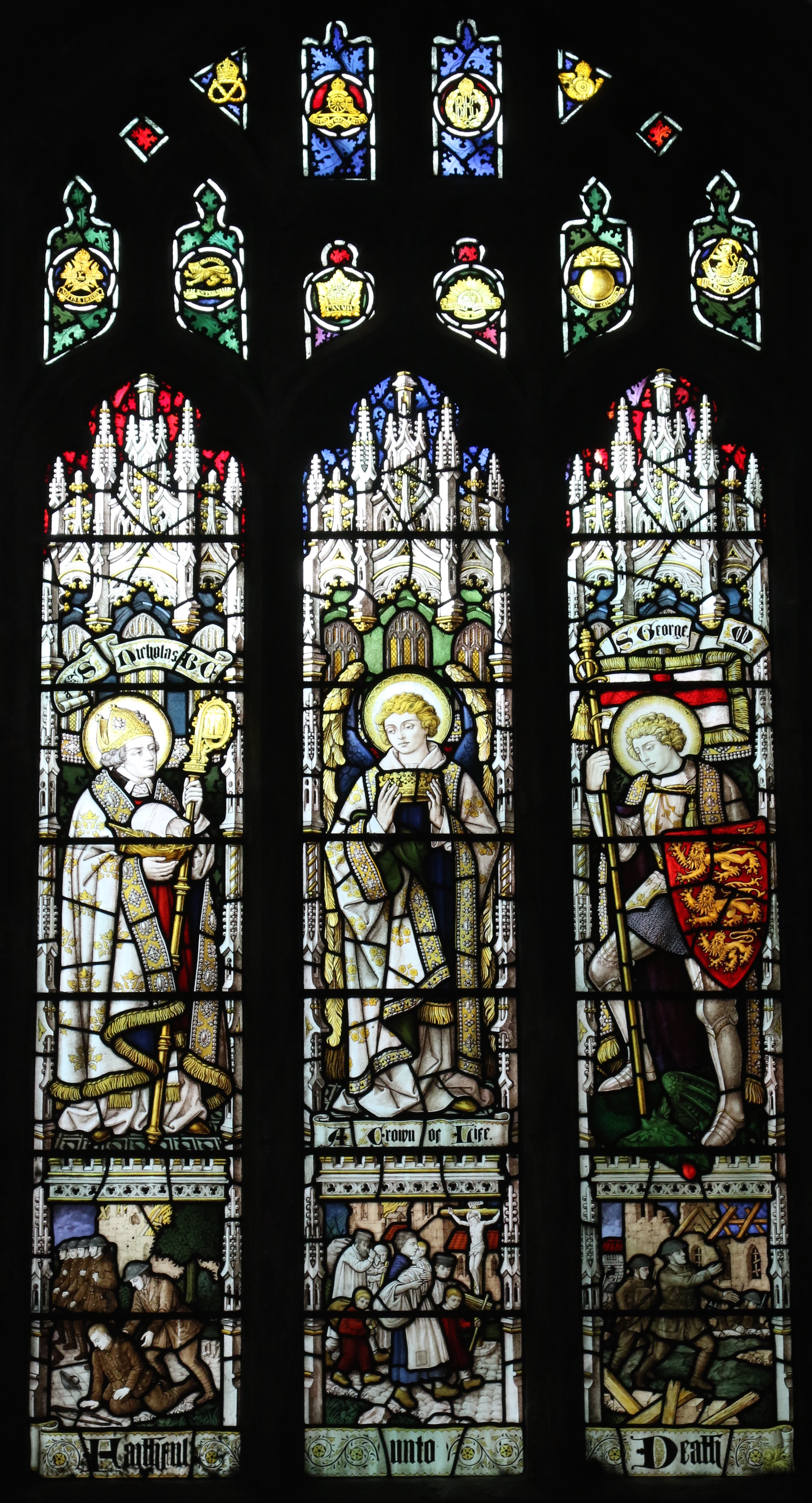
North aisle north east War Memorial window. By Alexander Gascoigne 1920.

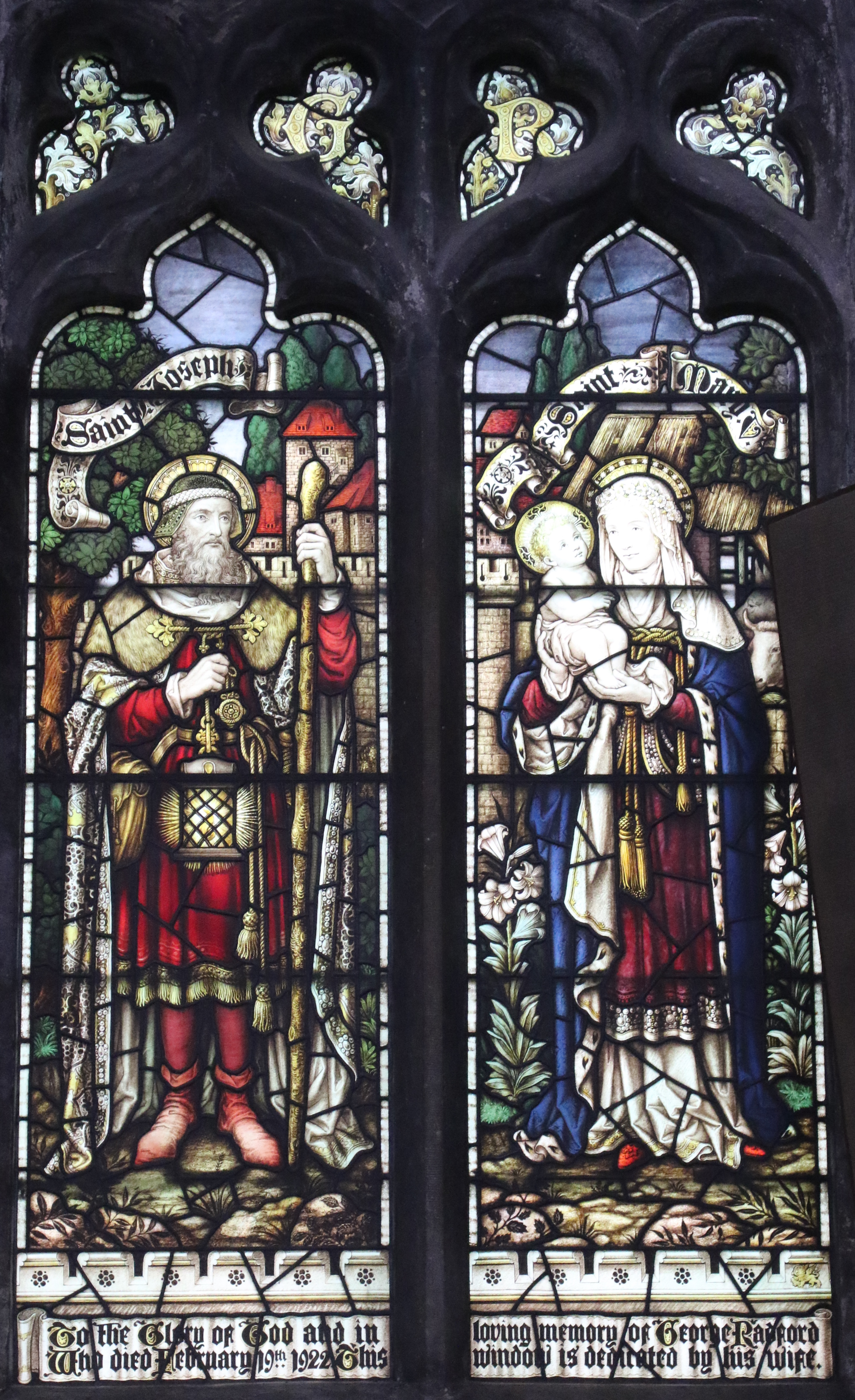
North aisle east window in memory of George Radford. By Alexander Gascoigne 1922.

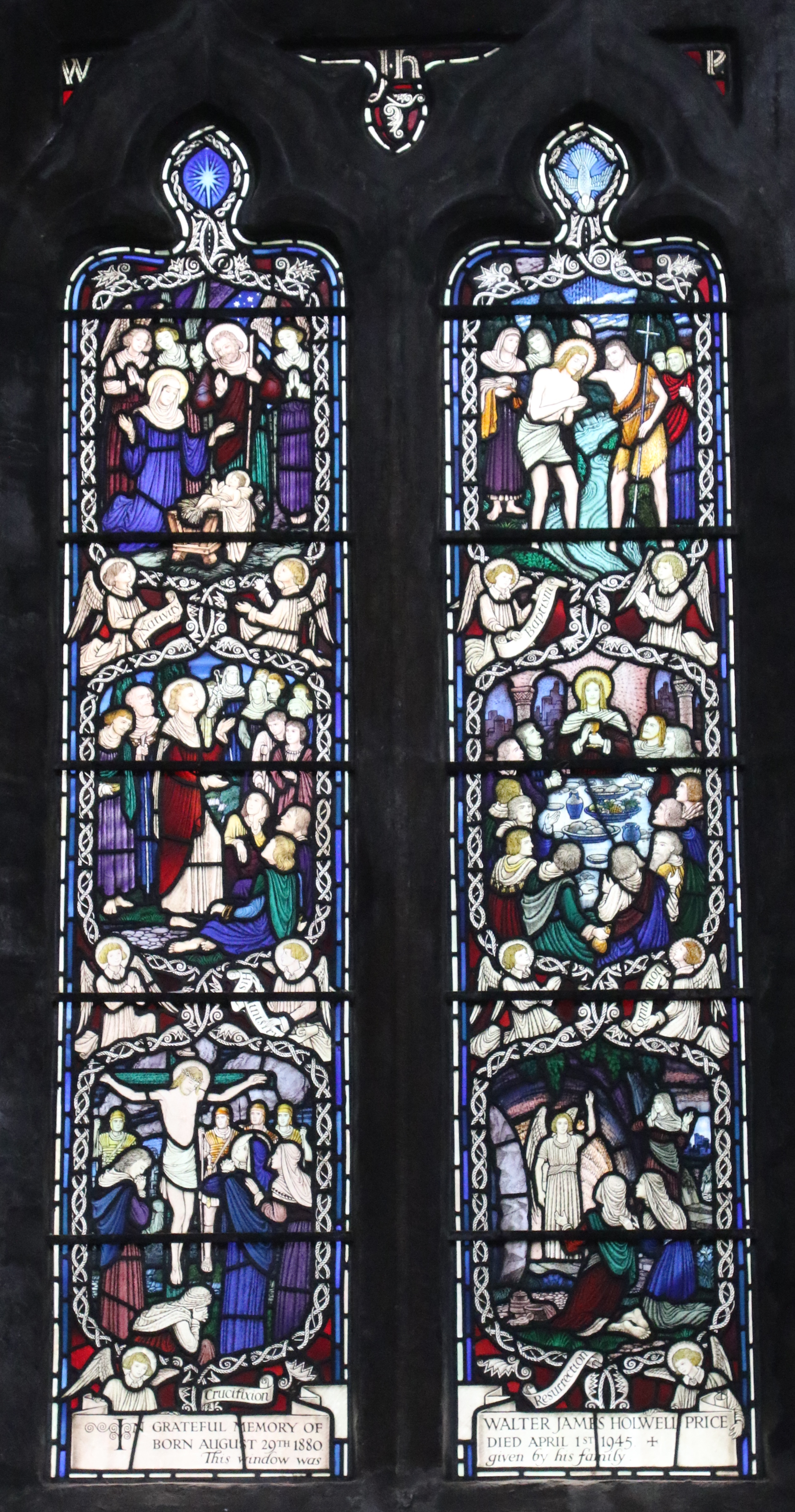
North aisle middle window in memory of Walter James Helwell Price. By Horace Hincks after 1950.

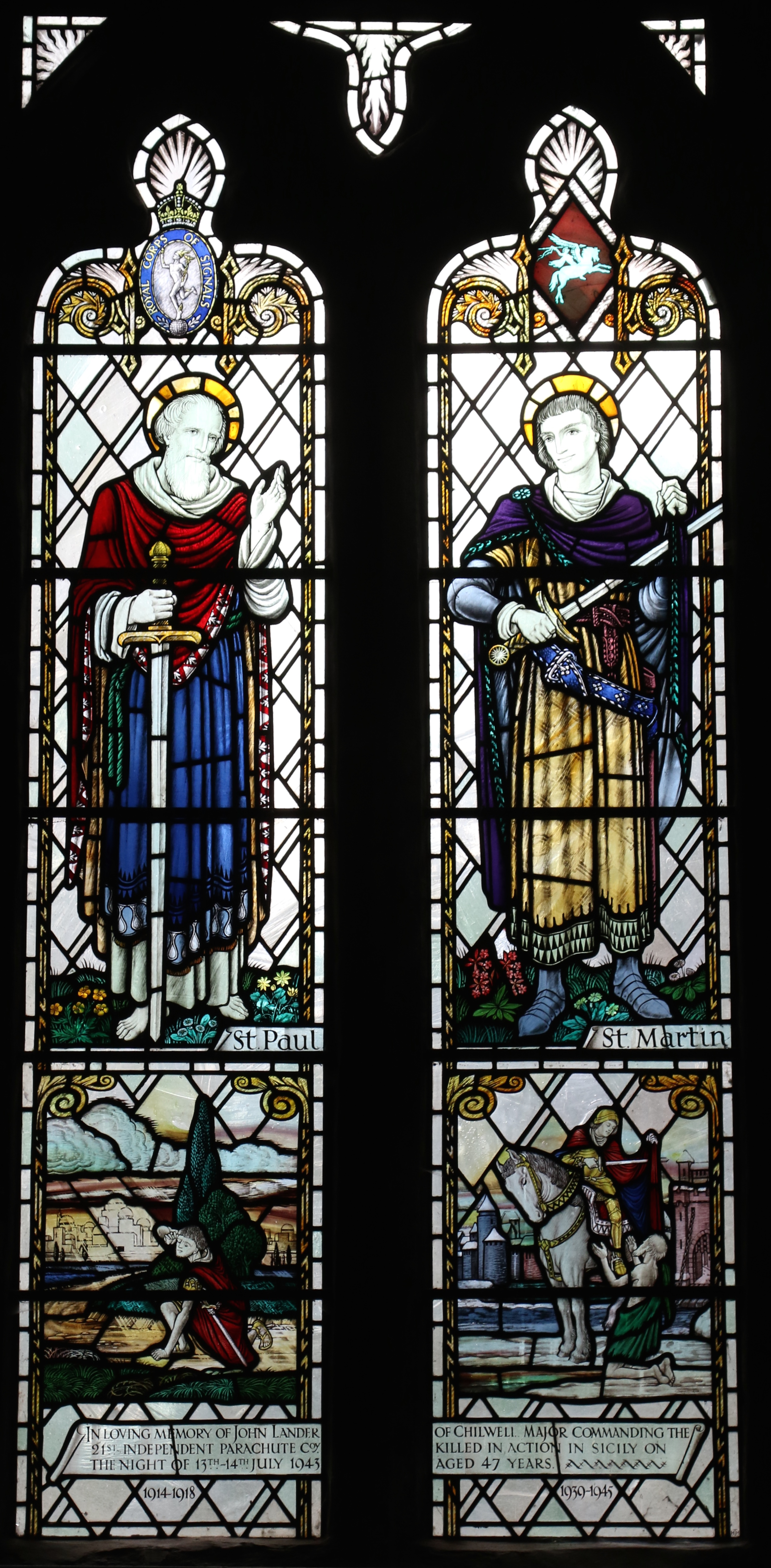
North aisle west window in memory of Major John Lander. By Horace Hincks and Pope & Parr 1943.

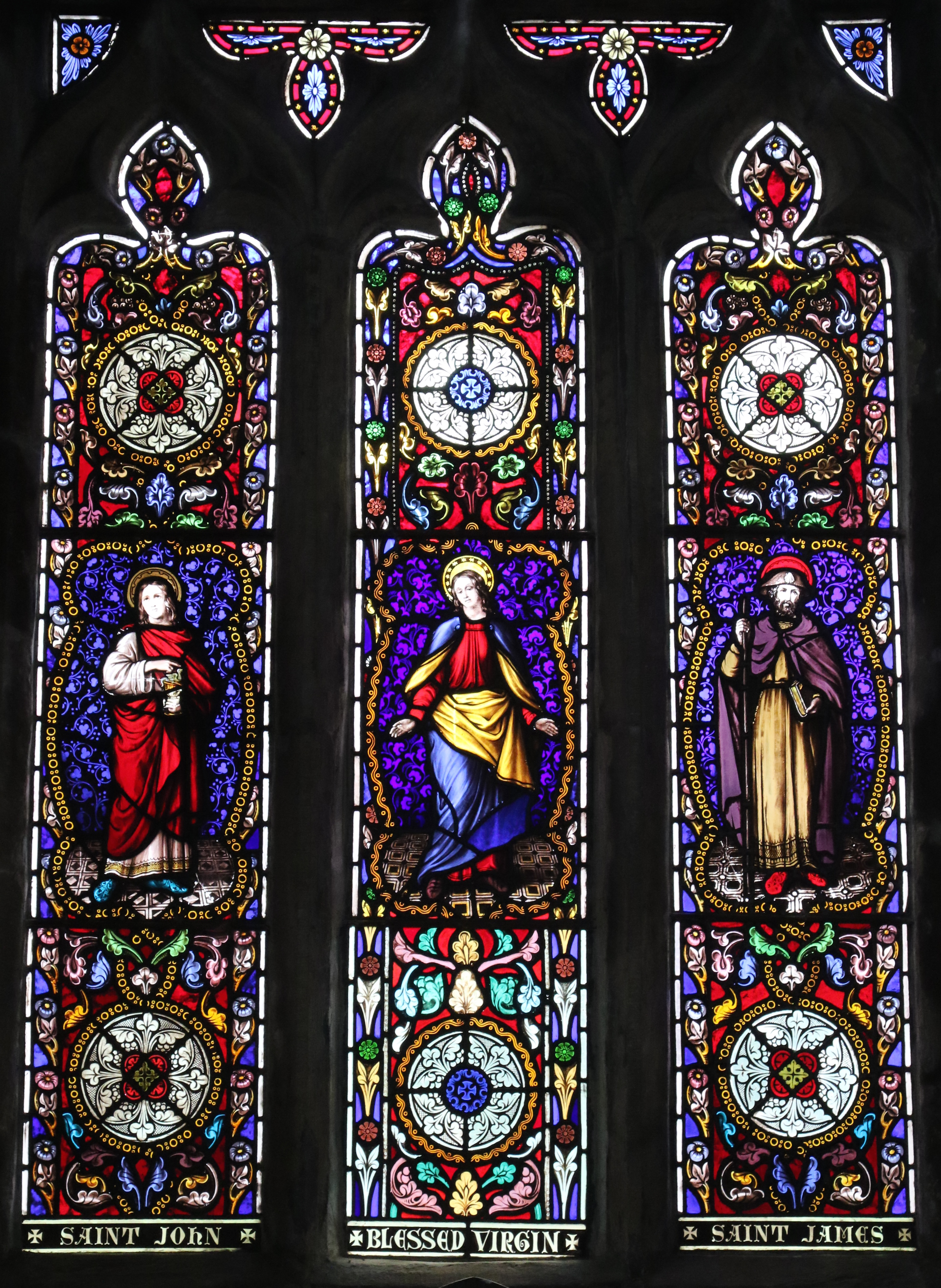
South east window, south aisle. By Alexander Gascoigne.

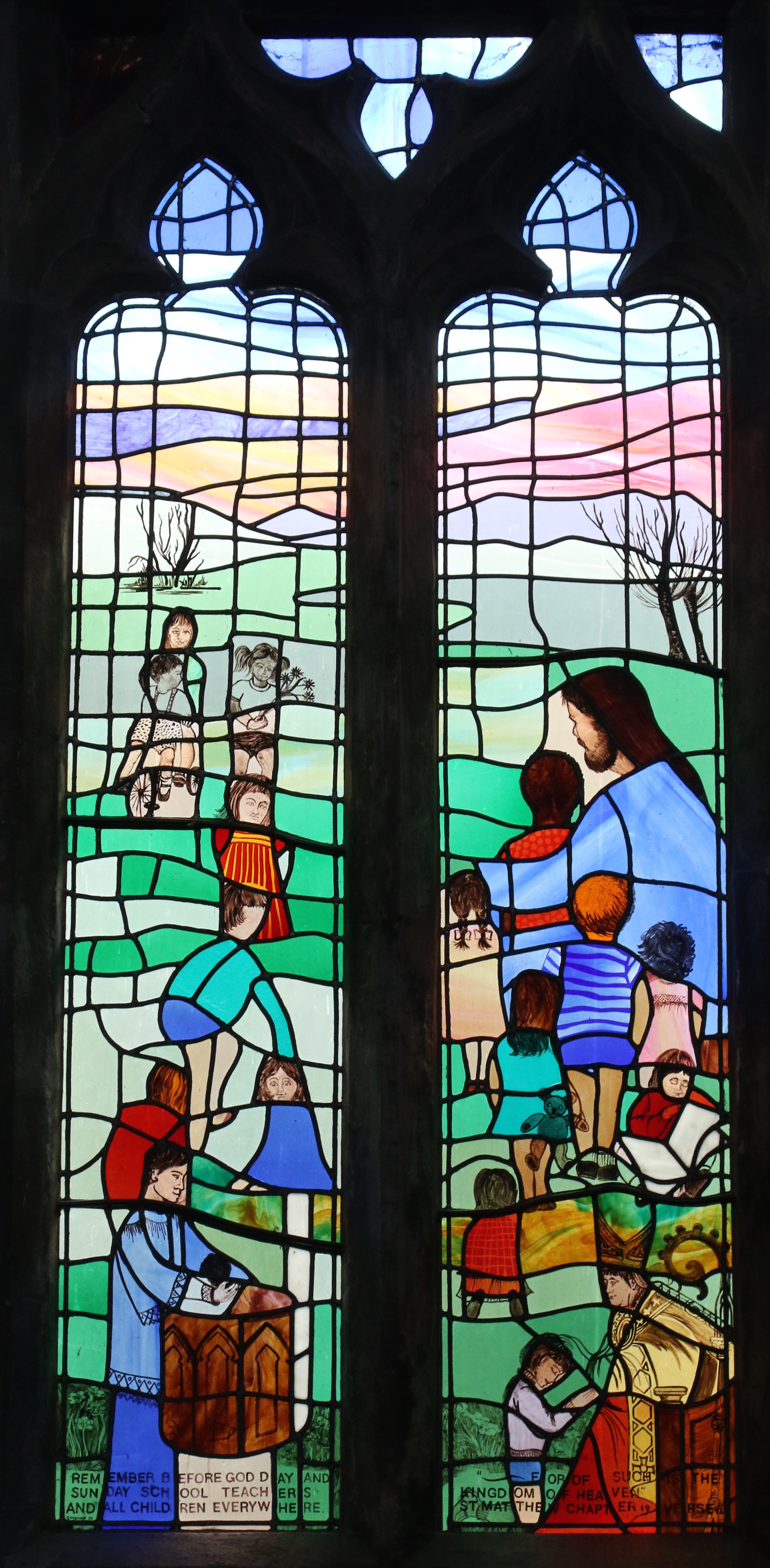
South aisle east window in memory of teachers. By Anne Goodman 1986.

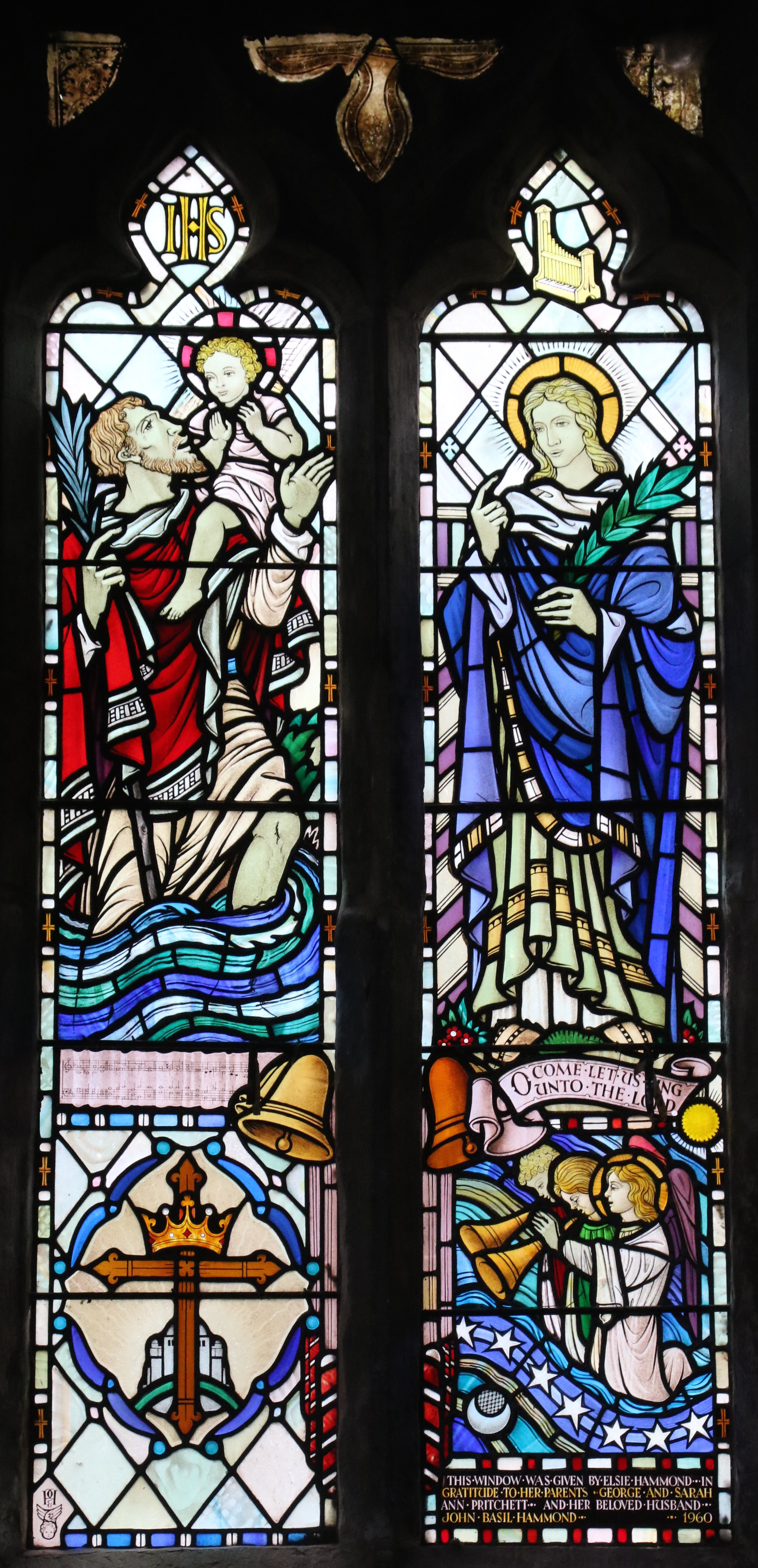
South aisle west window in memory of the parents and husband of Mrs Elsie Hammond (née Pritchett). By Pope and Parr 1960.

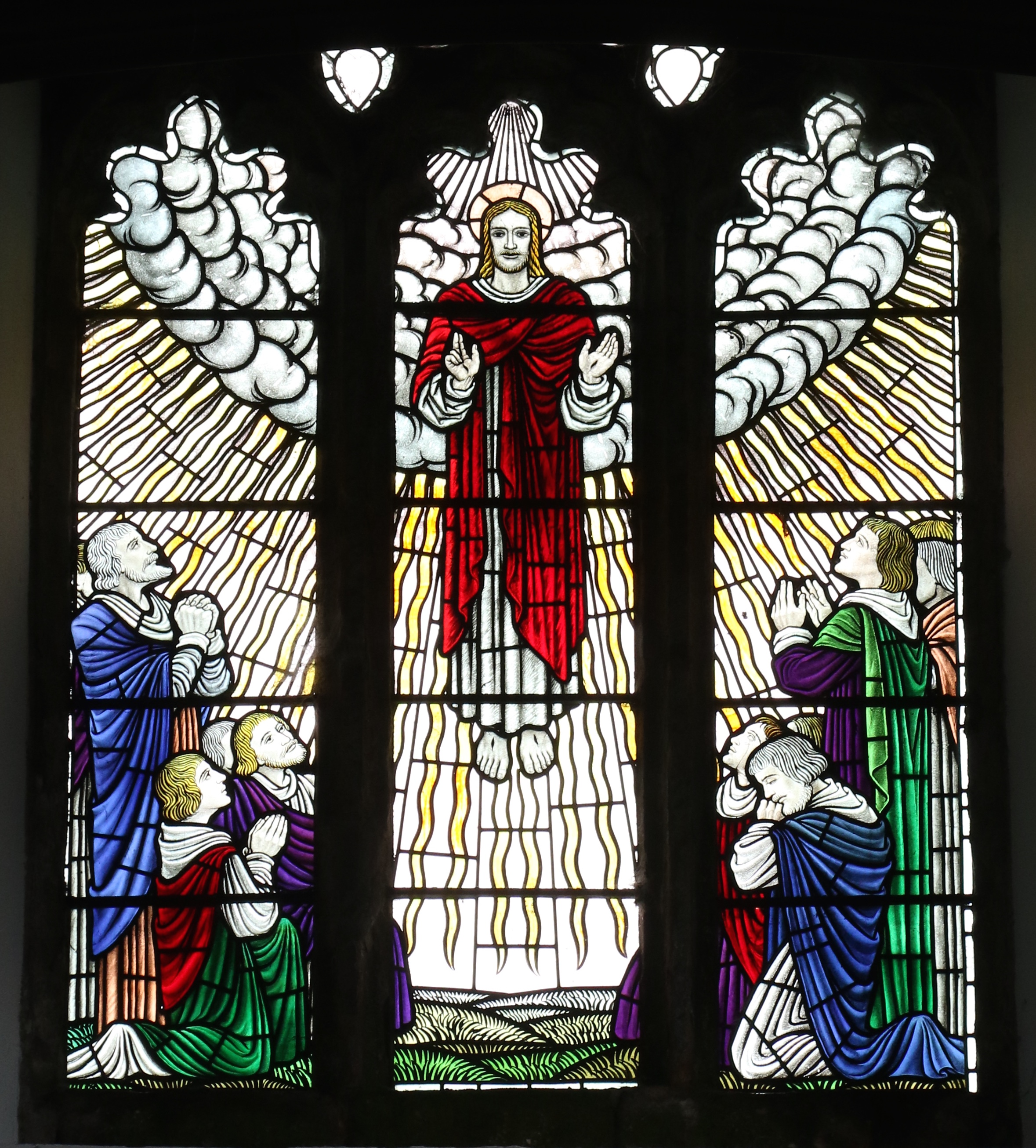
Window above the chancel arch in memory of Revd J Smaridge. By Horace Hincks and Pope & Parr 1946.

== Bells ==
There are eight bells in the tower. The oldest dates from 1370 where details of these are displayed in the tower.

== Organ ==
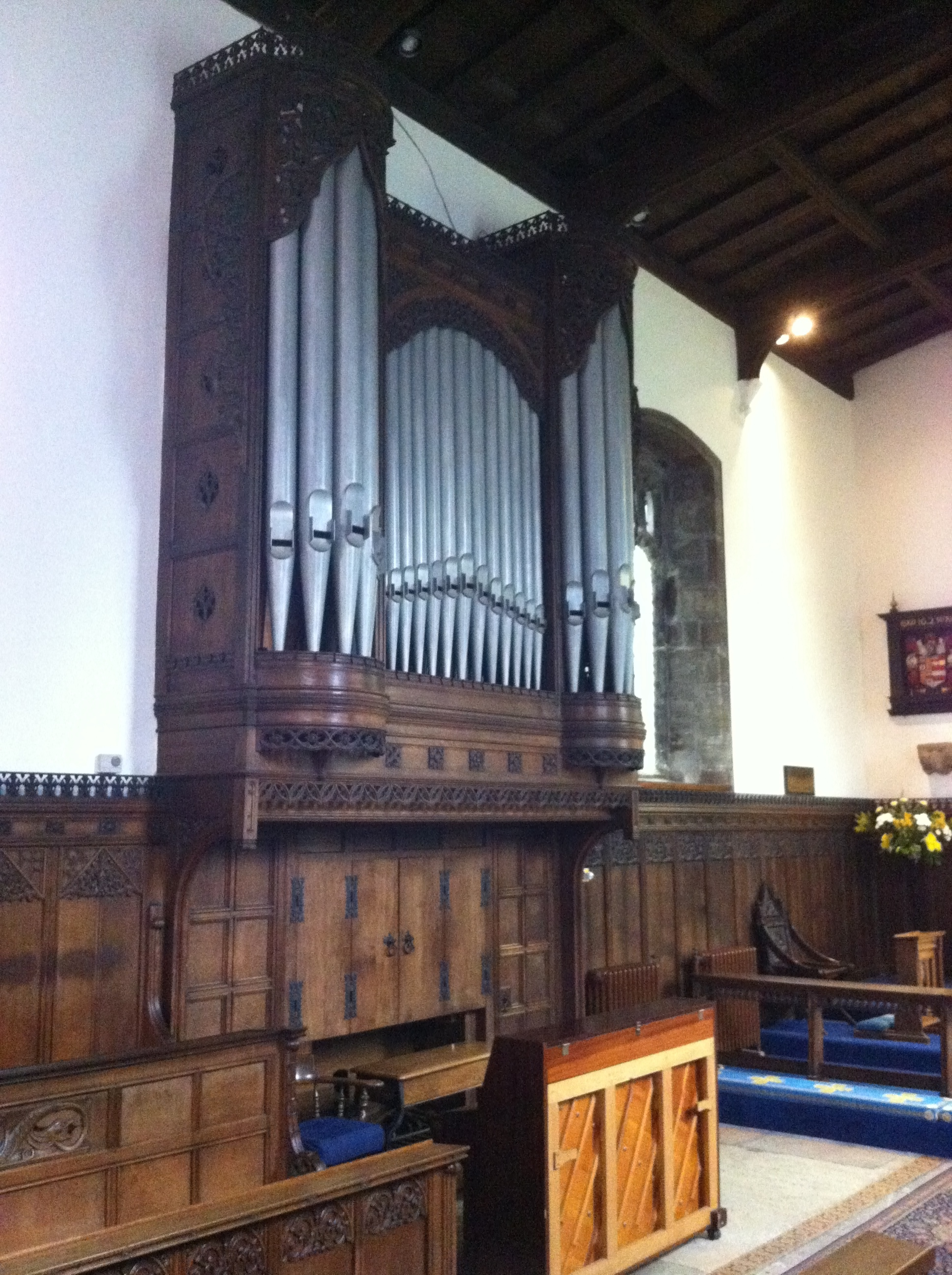
Organ of 1926-27

An organ was provided by Samuel Groves of London in May 1857, and was restored in 1869 by Lloyd and Dudgeon of Nottingham and in 1928 given to Christ Church, Chilwell

The current organ was installed in 1926-27 by Brindley & Foster and was opened by Bernard Johnson on 30 January 1927.

== Monuments and memorials ==
Early armorial bearings for the Babington, Nevil and Leake families of the 13th and 14th centuries were said to be visibly incorporated into certain church windows as late as 1840 but unfortunately no longer exist.

Later centuries are well represented by various arms and plaques. The most colourful of these is a carved wooden memorial bearing the arms of the Powtrell family, dated 1623 and depicted in red, white and gold on black. It is located on the east wall of the chancel. Also on the east wall is the alabaster memorial plaque to John Mather, Vicar of Attenborough, 1586–1625. Also mentioned are his two wives, Elizabeth and Joane.

The north wall of the chancel holds a brass plaque commemorating the Foljambe family who were for three centuries connected with the church. Also on this wall is a memorial to Francis Jaques, alias Gambard, of Toton, and his wife and children. Francis died 27 August 1606. The inscription tells us, that the memorial was erected by George, the oldest son.

High on the wall of the north aisle are the Warren arms, a hatchment measuring 5 ft × 5 ft (1.5 m × 1.5 m). This is associated with Admiral Sir John Borlace Warren, grandson of Arthur Warren and the heiress of Sir John Borlace. He was created a baronet in 1775.

The choir stalls, with four carved panels of mermaids and mermen (with initials I.P. part of the Powtrell family arms) bear the following inscription "To the Glory of God, and in loving memory of Josiah Brown of Attenborough and his wife Elizabeth of Bramcote. These stalls were given by their children. MCMXXVIII"

== Incumbents ==
Originally the incumbent was a Rector, but this was changed in 1346 to Vicar.

- Geoffrey de Westmeles
- 1229 Robert de Stanford
- 1244 John de Bella Acqua
- 1256 Henry de Grey
- 1280 William de Wederhalle
- 1286 William de Bosco
- 1290 Thomas de Blokeley
- 1309 Thomas de Vallibus (or Vaux)
- 1338 Thomas de Nevill
- 1346 Richard de Shirbroke
- 1349 William de Clipston
- 1362 Thomas de Hicklyng
- William Hopewood
- 1405 John Proctor
- 1406 John Stapilford
- Thomas Grey
- 1442 JohnThorcroft
- 1446 John Emlay
- 1452 William Roderham
- 1465 Henry Millot
- 1473 Alfred Gresbruke
- 1508 John Hull
- 1512 John Sheston
- 1533 Robert Herott
- 1557 Robert Bagulay
- 1568 Cuthbert Hutchensonne
- 1583 James Saire
- 1584 John Mather
- 1625 Gervase Dodson
- 1650 Anthony Watson
- 1658 William Crosse
- 1664 Henry Watkinson
- 1711 Benjamin Cockayne
- 1748 Christopher Gibson
- 1767 William Clarke
- 1783 Thomas Gaunt Barber
- 1790 Samuel Turner
- 1835 Joseph Shooter
- 1857 William Henry Cantrell
- 1861 Thomas William Bury
- 1875 Francis Henry Roughton
- 1900 Arthur Edgar Hughes
- 1916 Walter Marshall Browne (later Archdeacon of Rochester)
- 1923 John Buchanan Fraser (afterwards Vicar of St. Catharine's Church, Nottingham)
- 1937 Joseph Roberts
- 1954 Robert Tinsley Warburton
- 1967 Leslie Leonard Abbott
- 1976 Frank Thomas Beech
- 1985 Geoffrey Lewis Halliday
- 1989 Barry Dawson
- 2000 Sue Hemsley Halls
- 2014 Jonathan Smithurst
- 2021 Toby Artis

== Churchyard ==
The churchyard is described in the Terrier of 1777 as about 1-acre (4,000 m^{2}) of land, well fenced on the east with quick hedges, bounded on the north and west by Robert Holbrook's house, barn and thick walls of stone, and on the South by a stone wall and brook.

The east is still bounded by quick hedges and iron railings. The north is still bounded in part by the wall to Ireton House and also by a purpose built wall to the boundary of Church Lane. The original iron gates were put in situ in 1842 at a cost of £85.6 1/2d. and then replaced in the 20th century. The thick stone wall boundary between Ireton House and the west end of the church remains, but the stone wall on the south has disappeared to be replaced by hedging and alder trees. There were several elm trees situated along the north and south boundaries but unfortunately these were claimed by Dutch elm disease in the 1980s.

The church stands on the highest level of the churchyard with the land falling away slightly to the south and north. The churchyard does sometimes flood after a very wet winter with the water rising from the River Trent and gravel pit lakes to the South. Although access to the church is difficult at these times, the church building has never been flooded.

=== Notable burials ===
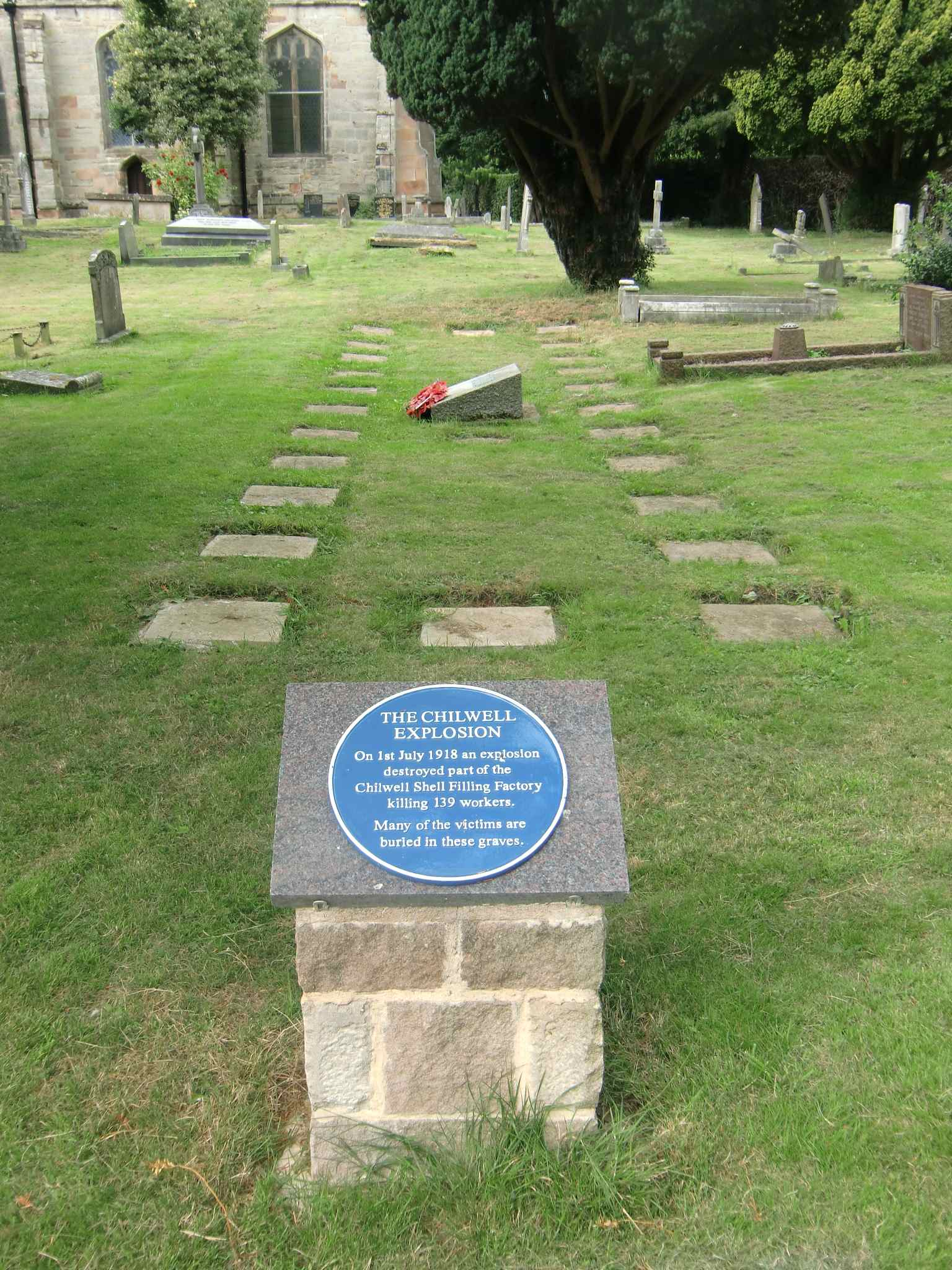
Mass grave

- Charlton family - 300 years Lords of the Manor of Chilwell.
- Day family
  - Thomas Day 1717 - first of Day family to be Parish Clerk.
  - Henry Day, died 2 May 1779 - Clerk of the Parish for 43 years. His name is inscribed on the church's 4th bell.
  - Sarah Winifred Day died 26 May 1992 - Last of the Day family to be Parish Clerk.
- Three siblings of Henry Ireton, also German and Jane Ireton in unmarked graves. (The famed Henry Ireton is not buried here; he was finally buried in disgrace at the foot of Tyburn gallows.)
- Chilwell Ordnance Factory explosion of 1 July 1918 - 134 persons killed - remains of many buried in a collective grave. Memorial unveiled on 13 March 1919.
- A more recent headstone of note commemorates Notts County footballer Harry Leuty who died in 1955, aged 35 yrs.

== See also ==
- Grade I listed buildings in Nottinghamshire
- Listed buildings in Attenborough and Chilwell
