= Listed buildings in Attenborough and Chilwell =

Attenborough and Chilwell East, and Chilwell West, are wards in the Borough of Broxtowe, Nottinghamshire, England. The wards contain eleven listed buildings that are recorded in the National Heritage List for England. Of these, one is listed at Grade I, the highest of the three grades, one is at Grade II*, the middle grade, and the others are at Grade II, the lowest grade. The wards contain the villages of Attenborough and Chilwell, and are mainly residential. The listed buildings consist of houses and associated structures, a church, a bridge, a memorial and a school.

== Key ==
Grade	Criteria
I	Buildings of exceptional interest, sometimes considered to be internationally important
II*	Particularly important buildings of more than special interest
II	Buildings of national importance and special interest

== Buildings ==
Name and location	Photograph	Date	Notes	Grade
St Mary's Church, Attenborough; 52.90398°N 1.23032°W		12th century	The church has been altered and extended through the centuries, the spire was rebuilt in 1848, the church was restored in 1868–69, and there have been later changes. It is built in stone with roofs of copper and tile, and consists of a nave with a clerestory, north and south aisles, a south porch, a chancel with an organ chamber and vestries, and a west steeple. The steeple has a tower with corner buttresses linked at the top by bands, lancet windows, a clock face, an embattled parapet, and a recessed octagonal spire. Embattled parapets run along the nave and the aisles.	I
Ireton House; 52.90379°N 1.23068°W		Late 15th century	The house, which was extended in the 19th century, has a timber framed core, it is encased in brick, and partly rendered, with a partial floor band and a tile roof. There are two storeys and an L-shaped plan, with a main range of four bays, and an extension to the northeast. The windows are a mix of casements and sashes, some of the latter horizontally-sliding, and there is a canted bay window and a gabled dormer.	II
Stone Croft; 52.91825°N 1.23237°W	—	Early 17th century	The house, which has retained elements of timber framing, is in stone on a plinth, with roofs of tile and pantile. There are two storeys and attics, and a T-shaped plan, with a front range of three bays. In the centre is a doorway with a Tudor arch, and the windows are casements, some on the front with chamfered and coved reveals and traces of mullions.	II
Rose Cottage; 52.90570°N 1.22574°W	—	Late 17th century	Two cottages, later combined into one house, it has a timber framed core with brick nogging, and is largely encased in brick. It has a tile roof, two storeys and two bays, and a later lean-to extension at the rear. On the front are two doorways with gabled hoods on curved brackets. The windows are casements, those in the ground floor with segmental heads.	II
Red Lion Cottage; 52.91829°N 1.23219°W		1682	The house, at one time a public house, has a timber framed core, and is encased in brick. It has a floor band, chamfered sills, a slate roof, two storeys and three bays. The windows are casements, and the ground floor windows and the doorway have segmental heads.	II
The Meads; 52.91802°N 1.23184°W	—	c. 1711	A farmhouse, later altered, in brick on a plinth, with dentilled eaves, and tile roofs with brick coped gables and kneelers. There are two storeys and attics, and an L-shaped plan. On the garden front is a doorway with a fanlight, and a projecting gabled wing containing a two-storey bow window. Elsewhere, is a three-light sash window, and the other windows are casements, some with segmental heads, and there are hipped dormers.	II
Erewash Bridge; 52.89632°N 1.22914°W		c. 1792	The bridge carries a footpath over the River Erewash. It is in stone, and consists of a single segmental arch with a chamfered impost band, a sill and keystones. The curved parapet walls end in four chamfered square piers, and on the south side is a 20th-century concrete pier, a lintel, and a pair of flood gates.	II
Ferndale Cottage, pump and stable 52.91917°N 1.22838°W		c. 1800	The house is in rendered brick with a slate roof. There are two storeys and an L-shaped plan, with a front range of three bays and a rear wing. On the front is a flat-roofed porch, and the windows are casement windows, those on the front in Gothick style with three lights, mullions and hood moulds. At the rear is a single-storey stable range, and a timber-cased lead pump with an octagonal stone trough.	II
Memorial to munitions workers 52.91188°N 1.24502°W		1919	The memorial is to munition workers of National Filling Factory No.6 who died in accidents during the First World War. It is in concrete, and consists of a truncated square pyramid with a vermiculated surface, on a base of three steps, surmounted by an obelisk. On the pyramid are stone plaques with inscriptions relating to the work carried out in the factory, and below are bronze plaques, one commemorating those lost in both World Wars, and the other relating to the explosion in the factory in 1918. The memorial is surrounded by shell casings linked by iron chains.	II
35 Hallams Lane, Chilwell; 52.91826°N 1.23525°W	—	1936–37	A house in rendered brick with felted concrete flat roofs. There is a D-shaped plan, with a cantilevered concrete slab forming a roof terrace and a balcony. The house contains metal-framed casement windows, French windows and porthole windows.	II*
Chilwell Lower School; 52.91211°N 1.23176°W		1975–76	The school is built in the CLASP system of prefabrication, consisting of a steel frame with concrete panels faced in brown brick chippings, and a metal roof with felt covering. There are two storeys and the plan consists of a courtyard surrounded by three rectangular blocks joined by narrow linking blocks.	II
