= Attenborough, Nottinghamshire =

Village in Nottinghamshire, England

Coordinates: 52°54′18″N 1°13′48″W

Attenborough
- Village
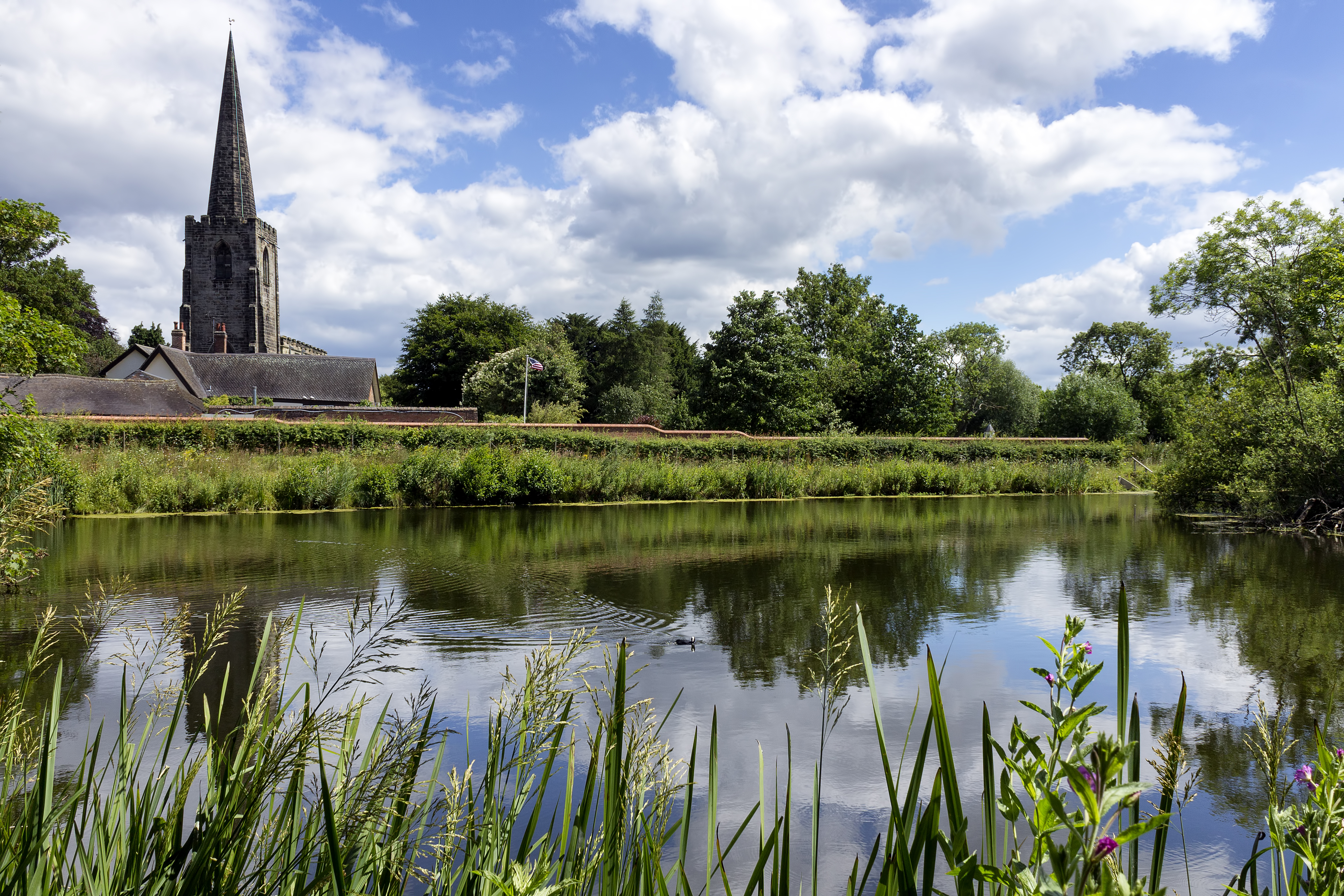
- Attenborough Parish Church

- Location within Nottinghamshire
- Population: 2,328 (Ward. 2011)
- OS grid reference: SK 51782 34486
- District: Borough of Broxtowe
- Shire county: Nottinghamshire
- Region: East Midlands
- Country: England
- Sovereign state: United Kingdom
- Post town: NOTTINGHAM
- Postcode district: NG9
- Dialling code: 0115
- Police: Nottinghamshire
- Fire: Nottinghamshire
- Ambulance: East Midlands
- UK Parliament: Broxtowe

Attenborough is a village in the Borough of Broxtowe in Nottinghamshire, England. It forms part of the Nottingham Urban Area and is 4 1/2 miles (7.2 km) to the south-west of the city of Nottingham, between Long Eaton (to the south-west) and Beeston (to the north-east). It adjoins the suburbs of Toton to the west and Chilwell to the north. The population of the ward, as at the 2011 Census, was 2,328.

The village is home to Attenborough railway station and the Attenborough Nature Reserve.

== History ==
Attenborough was known in Saxon times as Addensburgh. It was the home village of Henry Ireton (1611 – 26 November 1651), an English general in the army of Parliament during the English Civil War and son-in-law of Oliver Cromwell.

In the graveyard of St Mary's Church, there is a memorial to the 134 people killed on 1 July 1918 in an explosion in the shell factory in nearby Chilwell. This death toll remains the largest number of deaths caused by a single explosion in mainland Britain.

A ferry (Barton Ferry) used to cross the River Trent from the mouth of the River Erewash (near Attenborough) to Barton in Fabis. A crossing existed at this point since before 1774.

== Features ==
Attenborough Nature Reserve is a series of gravel pits, which were flooded after gravel extraction and are now a haven for birds and other wildlife.

The main commercial centre of Attenborough is around the junction of Nottingham Road (the A6005) and Attenborough Lane.

Nearer to the nature reserve is a tennis club, along with a private day-nursery, which, in 2005, along with the Attenborough Prep School, was bought by Robert Everist, who then sold the nursery and closed the 100-year-old school. In media coverage, it was claimed that Everist's company had pressured employees into handing in their notice a week before closing the company. The Attenborough Cricket Club (which doubles as the village green) and St. Mary's Church (a Church of England parish church). This southeastern part of Attenborough is bounded to the north-west by the railway line and on the other three sides by the wetlands of the nature reserve. It is the historic part of the village, with two listed buildings and the listed church itself.

In 1944, a plot of land was given on Attenborough Lane by Mr E.V. Brown and Mr J.M. Barnett for a village hall, but it was not until 1955 when funds permitted that construction began. The building was designed by Lionel Thraves of Messrs. Thraves and Son of Nottingham and built by the contractor A.H. Taylor (Nottingham) Ltd. It was named the Lucy Brown Village Hall in memory of the late wife of Mr. E.V. Brown. The cost of construction was £8,200 (equivalent to £177,600 in 2025). The opening on 15 September 1956 was attended by Mr. V.H. Oade (vice-chairman of Beeston and Stapleford Council) and Martin Redmayne, Baron Redmayne (M.P. for Rushcliffe).

In 1966, a hoard of Roman coins was found on the footpath that runs over the railway and onto Barrett Lane.

== Conservation areas ==
There are two conservation areas which Broxtowe Borough Council has designated in Attenborough. These are Attenborough Village and Attenborough Barratt Lane.

=== Attenborough Village Conservation Area ===
The conservation are comprises Church Lane, the north side of Shady Lane as far as Field House, The Strand and Sportsground and Attenborough Lane to its junction with Allendale Avenue. The conservation area was established in June 1977. Notable buildings include:

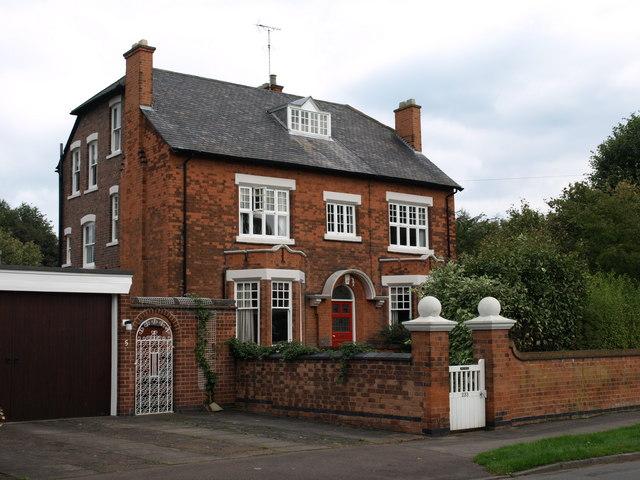
Cloud House, Attenborough Lane

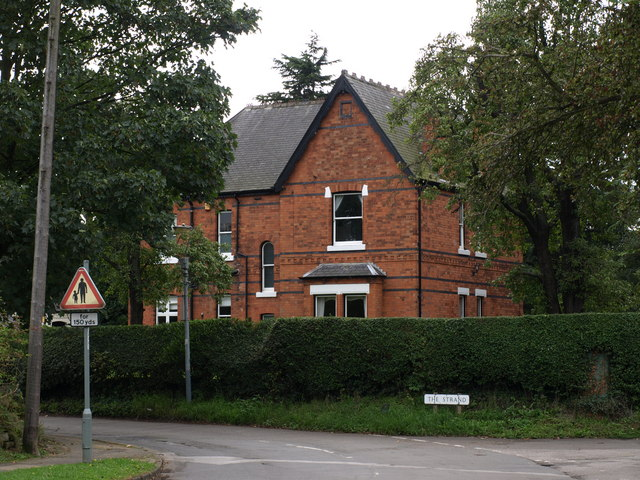
The Orchards, Church Lane

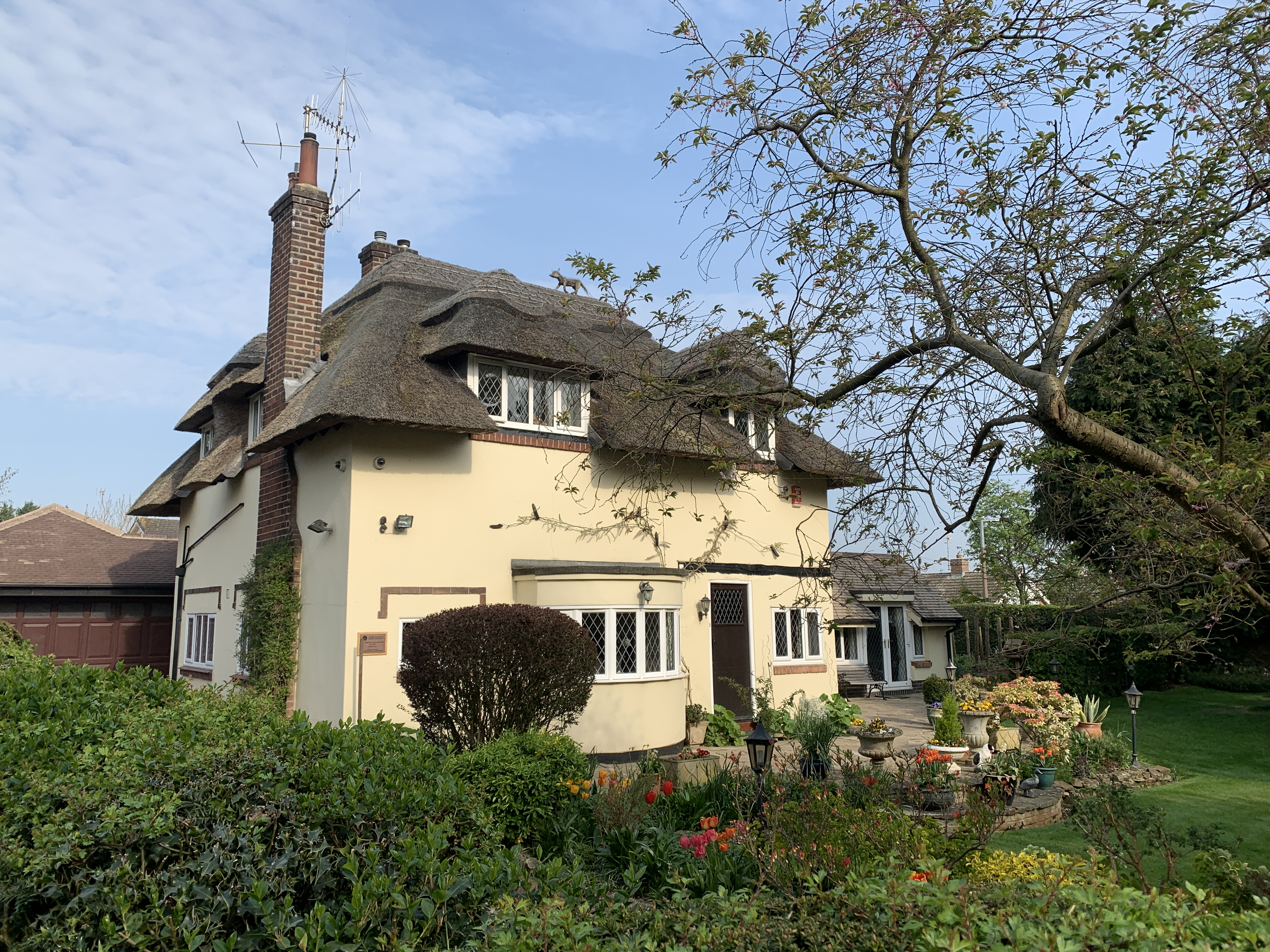
Thatched Cottage, Church Lane

- Hycroft. 202 Attenborough Lane
- Cloud House. 233 Attenborough Lane
- St. Mary's Church. Grade I listed
- The Orchards, 1 Church Lane, Attenborough
- Blue Gate, Church Lane, Attenborough
- Woodbine Cottage, 9 Church Lane, Attenborough
- Red Ridges, Church Lane, Attenborough
- Thatched Cottage, Church Lane, Attenborough
- Croft Cottage. 13 Church Lane, Attenborough
- Ireton House. 15 Church Lane, Attenborough Grade II listed
- Rothmere (formerly Glebe Croft). 17 Church Lane, Attenborough
- Vale Cottage. 19 Church Lane, Attenborough
- Field House Shady Lane
- Long Acres, 25 Shady Lane
- Rose Cottage, 45 The Strand, Attenborough. Grade II listed
- Brookside. 49 The Strand, Attenborough Architect John Rigby Poyser
- The Willows, 51 The Strand, Attenborough. Architect John Rigby Poyser

=== Attenborough Barratt Lane Conservation Area ===
The conservation area comprises the major part of Barratt Lane from number 23 to Attenborough Lane, Attenborough Lane from the level crossing to house number 201, and 1, 2 and 3 Long Lane. The conservation area was established in November 1980. The first nine houses were built at the end of the nineteenth century along the south side of Barratt Lane and had their fronts facing the railway rather than the lane, offering fine views towards the church and the River Trent beyond. Notable buildings include:

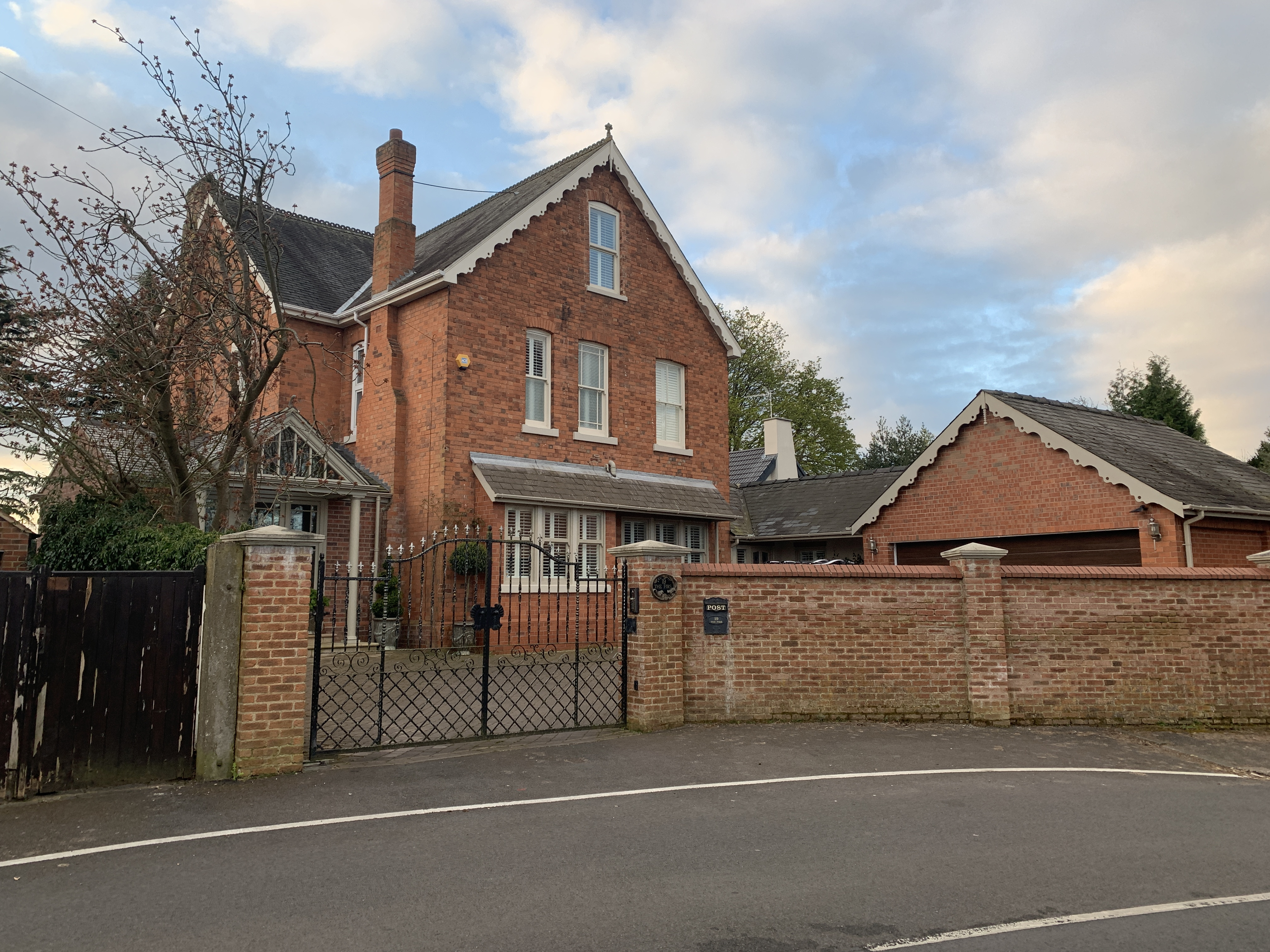
The Firs, Barratt Lane

- The Haven, 15 Barratt Lane
- 16 Barratt Lane. Architect H.H. Brittle 1937
- 17 Barratt Lane
- 18 Barratt Lane. Architect John Frederick Dodd 1936
- The Firs, 19 Barratt Lane
- Attenborough House 21 Barratt Lane.
- Norfolk House, 1 Long Lane
- 2 Long Lane
- 3 Long Lane

== Flood defences ==
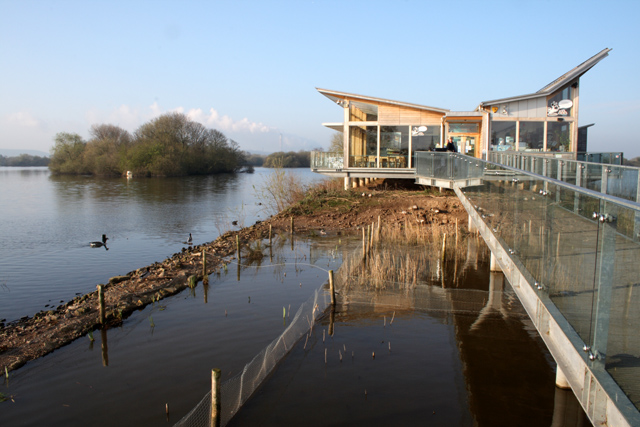
Attenborough Nature Centre

The village was flooded in November 2000. In 2006, plans were drawn up for substantial flood defences for the village. However, the scheme proved controversial because of the impact of a proposed high flood wall along The Strand. After a series of negotiations, planning permission was granted in August 2010, with the defences being moved to behind the village green. The work was completed in summer 2012.

== Governance ==
Attenborough is an unparished area and has no parish council. For local government and electoral purposes, Attenborough is within one of the wards of Broxtowe Borough Council, 'Attenborough & Chilwell East' Ward, and returns one Borough Councillor. In the 2007 local elections, the Conservatives won the seat. For elections to Nottinghamshire County Council the village is covered by the electoral division of Beeston South & Attenborough (consisting of the Beeston Central, Beeston Rylands and Attenborough wards). In 2009, the Conservative candidate won the division.

For elections to Parliament, the village is part of the Broxtowe constituency for which the present Member for Parliament is Juliet Campbell of the Labour Party.

== Transport ==
=== Buses ===
Bus services in the area are operated by Trent Barton and Nottsbus Connect; key routes are:

- Indigo: Nottingham – QMC – University Boulevard – Beeston – Chilwell – Attenborough – Toton – Long Eaton - Spondon - Derby
- Skylink: Nottingham - South Lenton - University Boulevard - South Beeston - Chilwell - Attenborough - Long Eaton - Sawley - East Midlands Airport - Coalville
- 510: Beeston - Toton - Stapleford

=== Railway ===
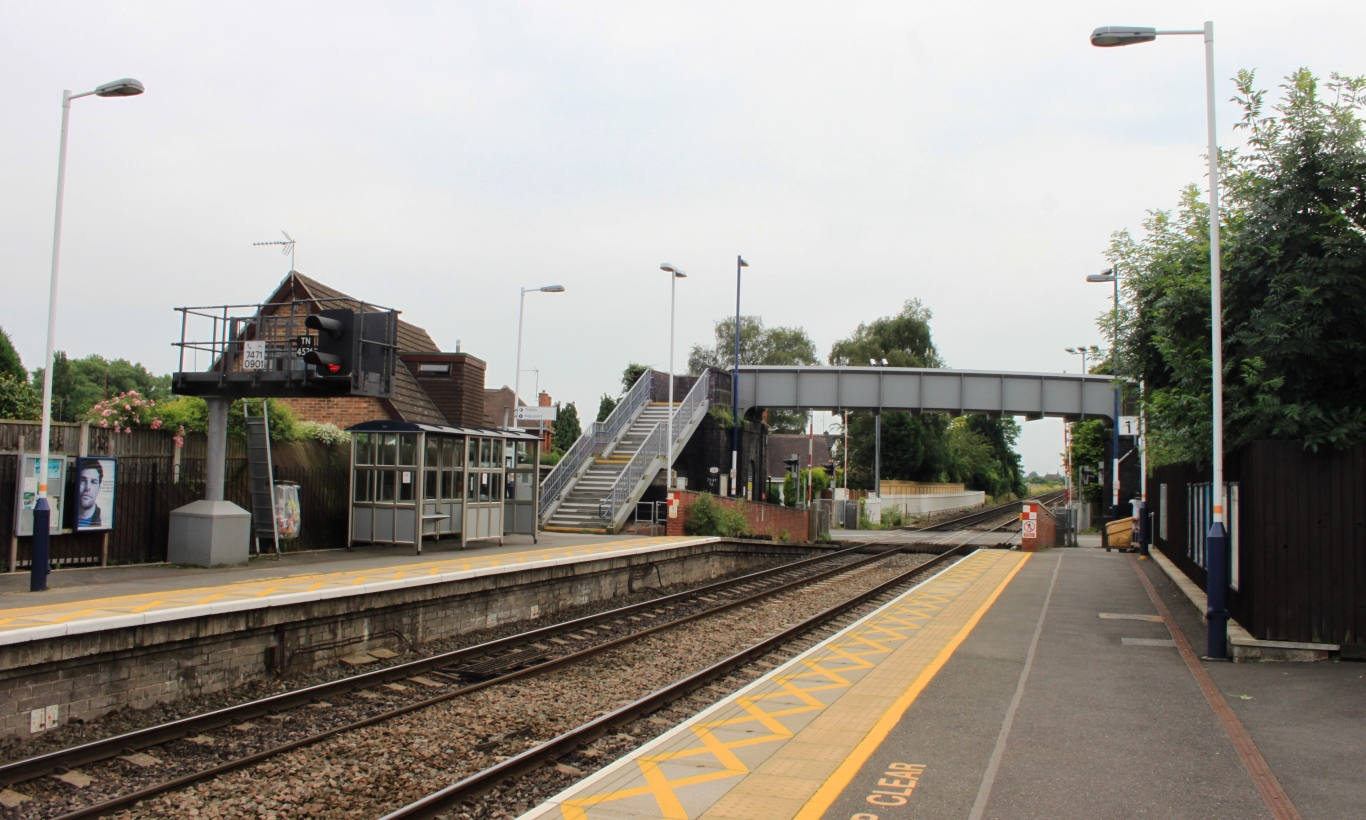
Attenborough railway station

Attenborough railway station is managed by East Midlands Railway, which operates the following services that stop here:

- A two-hourly service (hourly at peak times) between Matlock and Nottingham, via Derby.
- An hourly service between Leicester and Lincoln or Grimsby.

CrossCountry operates a small number of stopping services, in the early morning and late evening, on the route between Nottingham, Birmingham and Cardiff.

Beeston railway station is approximately 1 1/2 miles (2.4 km) away, where additional stopping services are available on these routes; these include hourly inter-city services between Nottingham, Leicester and London St Pancras.

=== Roads ===
The village is connected with Nottingham by the A6005.

=== Air ===
East Midlands Airport is approximately 7 1/2 miles (12.1 km) away; the airport serves domestic and international routes, focused mainly within Europe.

== Sport ==
The village has its own non league football club, Attenborough F.C. founded in 1947, who currently play in the Nottinghamshire Senior League Division Two at the Strand.

== Notable residents ==
- Henry Ireton Roundhead General during the English Civil War and son-in-law to Oliver Cromwell, born in Attenborough in 1611.
- Sophia Di Martino actress in TV series including Flowers, Friday Night Dinner, Casualty and Loki, born in Attenborough in 1983.

== See also ==
- Listed buildings in Attenborough and Chilwell
