= Attenborough railway station =

Railway station in Nottinghamshire, England

Attenborough
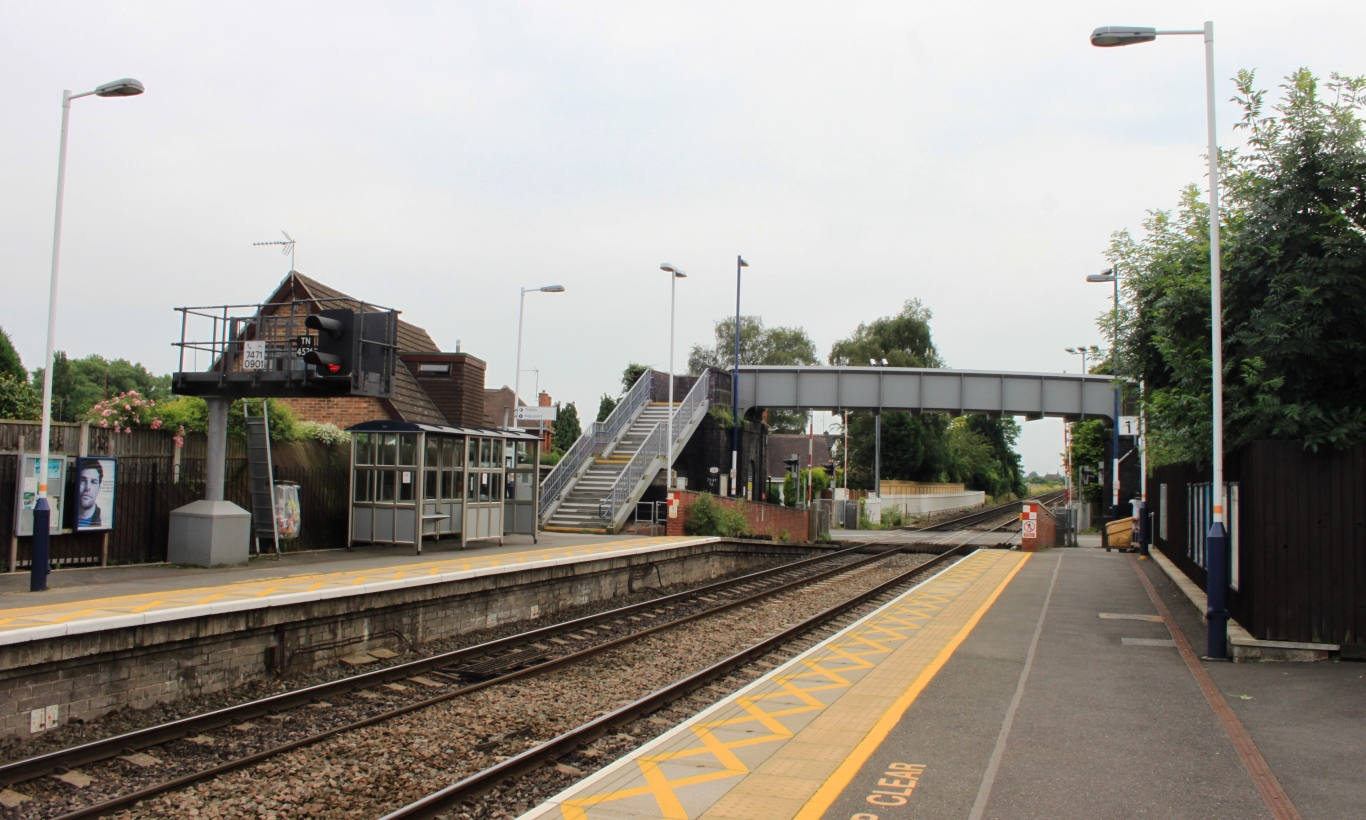

General information
- Location: Attenborough, Broxtowe, England
- Coordinates: 52.9067°N 1.2306°W
- Grid reference: SK518346
- Manager: East Midlands Railway
- Platforms: 2

Other information
- Station code: ATB
- Classification: DfT category F2

Key dates
- 1 December 1856: Opened as Attenborough Gate
- 1 November 1858: Closed
- 1 September 1864: Reopened as Attenborough
- 19 April 1937: Renamed Chilwell
- 27 September 1937: Renamed Attenborough

Passengers
- 2020/21: ▼17,586
- 2021/22: ▲46,934
- 2022/23: ▲52,704
- 2023/24: ▲68,916
- 2024/25: ▲96,094
Location
Notes
- Passenger statistics from the Office of Rail and Road

Attenborough railway station (originally Attenborough Gate and briefly known as Chilwell) serves the village of Attenborough, in Nottinghamshire, England. It lies on a spur of the Midland Main Line between East Midlands Parkway and Nottingham. The station is managed by East Midlands Railway.

== History ==
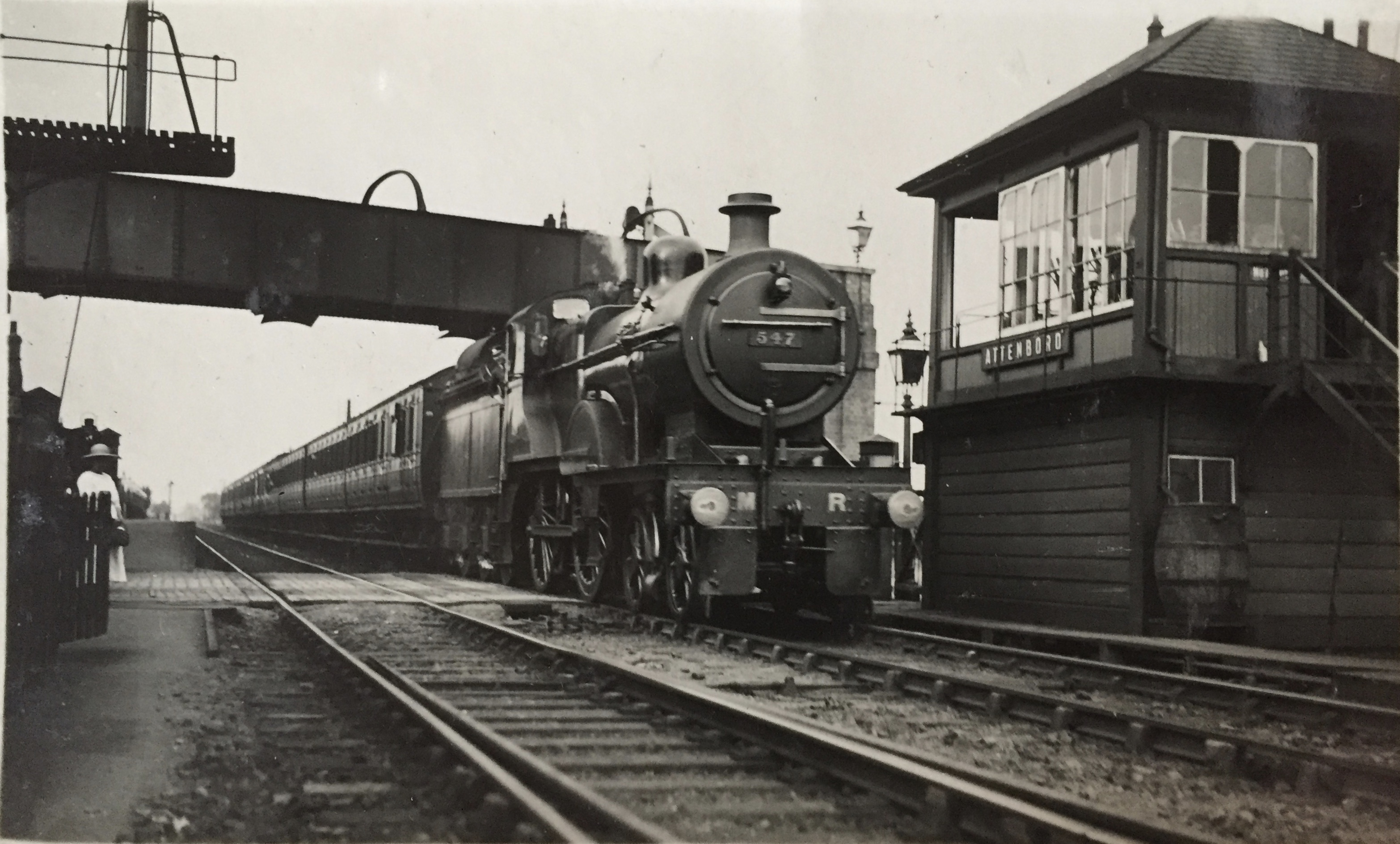
A Midland Railway locomotive 547 fitted for oil burning (c. 1920)

The station was built as a halt in 1856, known as Attenborough Gate, on the Midland Counties Railway line from Nottingham to Derby, which had opened in 1839. It was sited next to a level crossing and tickets were bought from the crossing keeper.

The station was built on its present site by the Midland Railway and opened on 1 September 1864; the Gate suffix was dropped and the name became Attenborough.

Becoming part of the London, Midland and Scottish Railway (LMS) during the Grouping of 1923, the station then passed on to the London Midland Region of British Railways on nationalisation in 1948.

During World War I, the station had its platforms extended as it was used as an interchange for soldiers and workers heading for National Shell Filling Factory no. 6 at Chilwell.

In April 1937, the station was renamed Chilwell; however, this did not go down well with Attenborough locals who raised a petition, which 235 local people signed. This resulted in a decision by the LMS to revert the name to Attenborough.

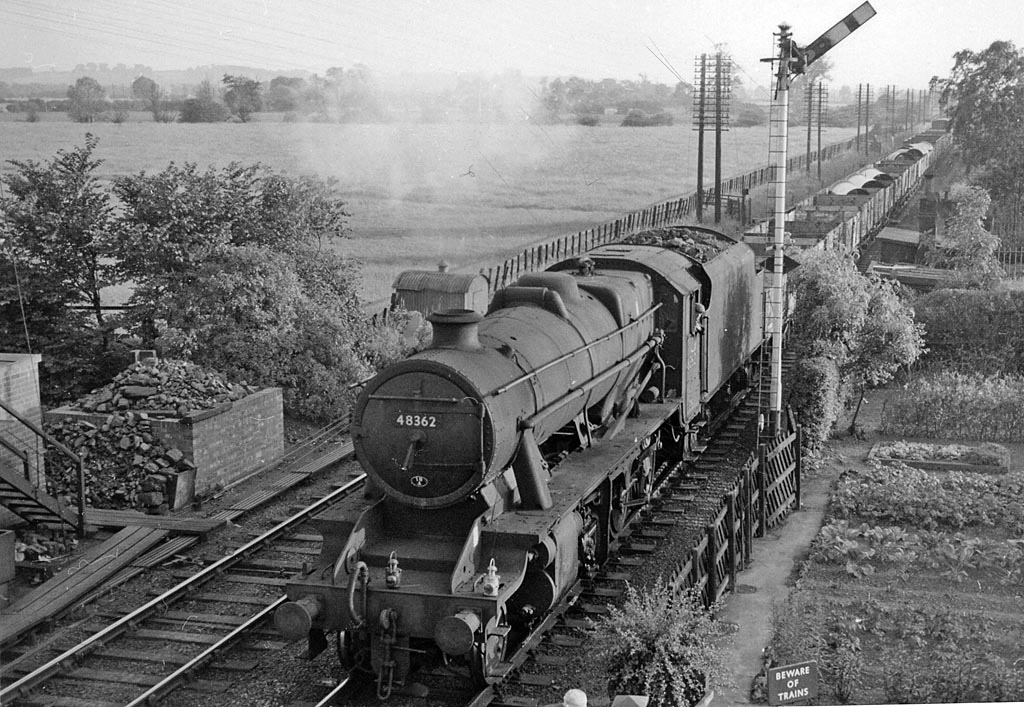
A down freight train approaching the station (1961)

The signal box survived until at least 1982, but has since been demolished.

When sectorisation was introduced in the 1980s, the station was served by Regional Railways until the privatisation of British Rail.

It is an unstaffed station, having lost its buildings and staff in the early 1990s. Following a rebuild of the platforms in 2005, the station has no architectural remains from any earlier station except for parts of the footbridge.

The footbridge was replaced in 2007, receiving a new steel deck and stairways. The blue brick towers, which support the bridge, were retained.

== Services ==
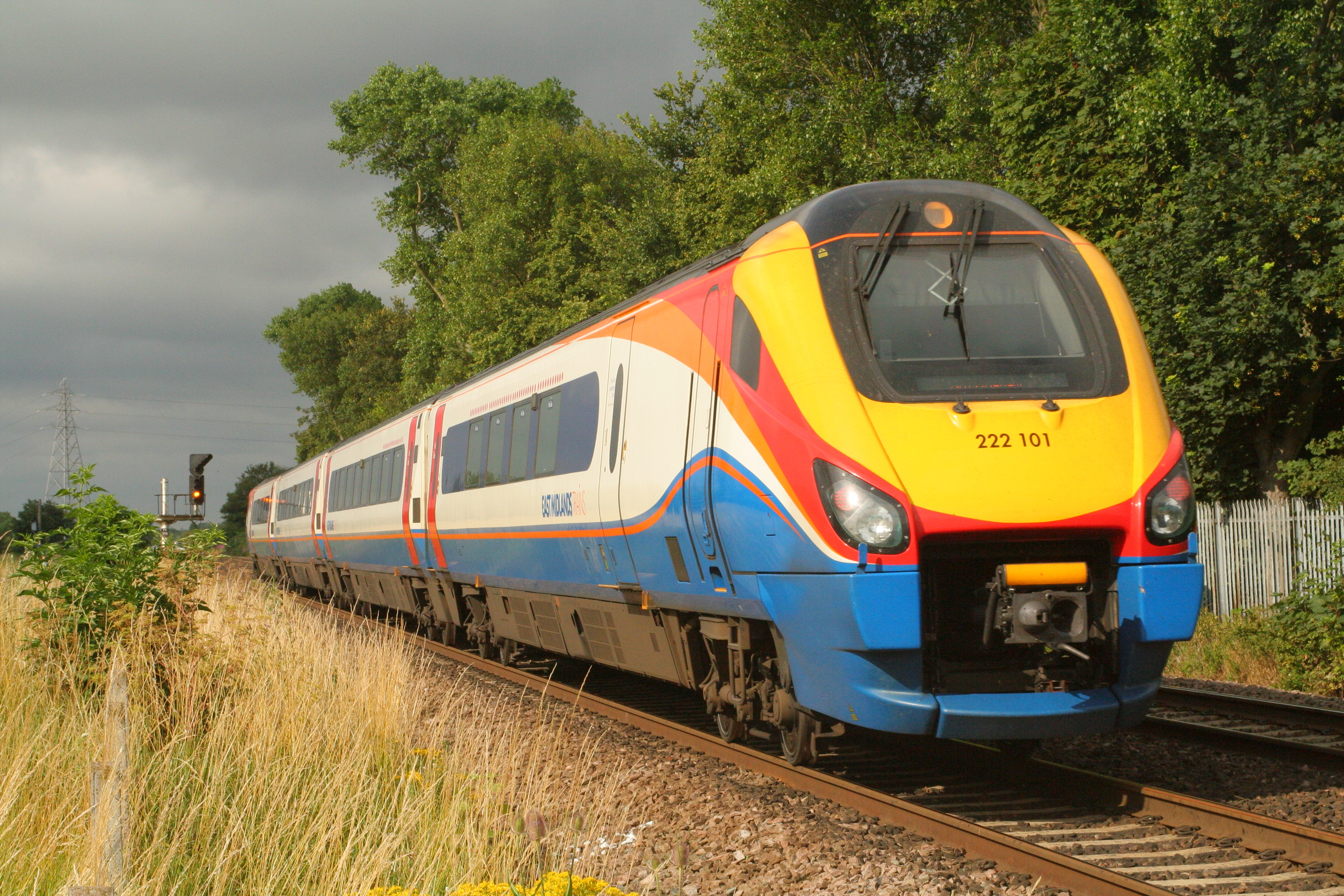
A Class 222 Meridian on an inter-city service near Attenborough on the Midland Main Line

East Midlands Railway operates the following general off-peak service in trains per hour (tph):

- 1 tph to Crewe, via Derby
- 1 tph to Leicester
- 1 tph to Lincoln, via Nottingham
- 1 tph to Nottingham.

Interchange with EMR's inter-city services can be made at Leicester, Derby and Nottingham; trains between Nottingham and London St Pancras pass through Attenborough but do not stop.

Interchange with Northern Trains services to Sheffield and Leeds can be made at Nottingham; some Northern services pass through Attenborough in the early mornings and at night, but do not stop.

CrossCountry operates a small number of stopping services, in the early morning and late evening, on the route between Nottingham, Birmingham New Street and Cardiff Central.

Preceding station	National Rail	Following station
Long Eaton	CrossCountry Cardiff–Nottingham	Beeston
Long Eaton	East Midlands Railway Lincoln to Crewe	Beeston
East Midlands Parkway	East Midlands Railway Leicester–Nottingham	Nottingham
