= Robert Everist =

English businessman

- Occupation: Businessman
- Political party: Conservative
- Spouse: Susan Mills

Robert Lewis Everist is an English businessman. An entrepreneur, he has set up childcare centres, commercial office space, small schools and plastic manufacturing businesses.

In 2009, on its centenary year, Everist and his wife Susan Mills closed the Attenborough School which they owned. A teaching union claimed their holding company had pressured employees of the subsidiary into handing in notice a week before its closing.

In October 2017, Everist's stepson, Charlie Mills joined the cast of Made in Chelsea, a television show on E4 which follows the lives of affluent young people living in West London.
