= Frank Everist =

English footballer (1885-1945)

Personal information
- Full name: Frank James Everist
- Date of birth: April qtr. 1885
- Place of birth: Orpington, England
- Date of death: 30 August 1945 (aged 60)
- Place of death: Farnborough, Kent, England
- Height: 5 ft 10 in (1.78 m)
- Position: Outside forward

Senior career*
| Years | Team | Apps | (Gls) |
- Grasmere United
- Cray Wanderers
- Orpington
| 1906–1907 | Southampton | 8 | (2) |
| 1907–1908 | Croydon Common | 8 | (2) |
| 1908–1909 | Dartford | | |
| 1913–1914 | Cray Wanderers | | |
| 1919–19?? | Orpington | | |
- * Club domestic league appearances and goals

Frank James Everist (1885 – 30 August 1945) was an English professional footballer who played as an outside-forward for Southampton and Croydon Common in the 1900s. Although he distinguished himself as an amateur sprinter, he achieved little success at football.

== Football career ==
Everist was born in Orpington, Kent and played his early football for various clubs in the county, including Cray Wanderers and Orpington. He was also an amateur runner who won in excess of 40 prizes on the athletics track.

He was recommended to Southampton of the Southern League by a Kent-based supporter and signed for the club in May 1906. As a former sprinter, he was able to use his speed to great effect in the reserves, earning him a call-up to the first team on 29 September 1909, replacing Wally Radford at outside-right for one match, a 2–1 defeat at Brentford. For the next match, manager Ernest Arnfield tried Joe Blake on the left before Frank Jefferis became the established left-winger.

Everist returned to the side in December, playing two matches at outside-left, scoring his first goal in a 1–1 draw at Norwich City, but was never able to establish himself in the first-team. He had five further appearances, in various forward positions, later in the season at the end of which the "Saints" finished 11th in the table, their worst position since the inauguration of the league.

During his time at The Dell, Everist was also employed as the club's maintenance man.

In the summer of 1907, he moved back to South London to join Croydon Common who had just turned professional. At Croydon, he joined former Southampton players Samuel Meston, Alex McDonald, Bert Hodgkinson and Harry Hadley. He made his debut for Croydon Common in their first match in the Southern League Second Division and also played in their first FA Cup match, a 1–1 draw against Woolwich Arsenal. Everist spent one season at The Nest, during which he made a total of 29 appearances, scoring eight goals.

In October 1908, he moved to Dartford, where he acquired the nickname "German". He later spent time playing for his two former clubs, Cray Wanderers and Orpington.

Everist died at the County Hospital in Farnborough, Kent on 30 August 1945, aged 60.
