= 2027 Broxtowe Borough Council election =

Local election in England

- 6 May 2026

All 44 seats to Broxtowe Borough Council 23 seats needed for a majority

	First party	Second party	Third party
Leader	Milan Radulovic	Philip Owen	Peter Bales
Party	Broxtowe Alliance	Conservative	Labour
Leader's seat	Eastwood Hill Top	Nuthall East and Strelley	Watnall and Nuthall West
Last election	Did not exist	10	26
Seats before	19	10	7
	Fourth party	Fifth party
Leader	David Watts	Richard MacRae
Party	Liberal Democrats	Broxtowe Independent Group
Leader's seat	Bramcote	Stapleford North
Last election	5	Did not exist
Seats before	3	5
Leader before election
Milan Radulovic
Broxtowe Alliance
No overall control
Leader after election
TBD

The 2027 Broxtowe Borough Council election will take place on 6 May 2027, to elect all 44 members of Broxtowe Borough Council in England. This will be on the same day as other local elections held across the United Kingdom.

== Background ==
Broxtowe is one of the seven non-metropolitan districts that make up Nottinghamshire County Council. The district was controlled by the Conservatives from its creation until 1995, when Labour formed a majority administration. The Conservatives regained the council in 2015 from no overall control, but the 2019 election again saw the council under no overall control.

Labour formed their third majority administration following the 2023 election, winning 26 seats against an opposition of 10 Conservatives, 5 Liberal Democrats, and 3 independents. However, the Labour group on the council split in January 2025. All but 8 Labour councillors, including the leader of the council, left the party in opposition to Sir Keir Starmer's leadership. Following a naming dispute with a grouping of independent councillors known as the Broxtowe Independent Group, (Note: The Broxtowe Independent Group have since registered as a political party) the councillors formed a new political party named Broxtowe Alliance which governs as a minority administration.

=== Local government reorganisation ===
Broxtowe is one of the districts planned to be abolished as part of upcoming structural changes to local government in England. The northern part of the district is expected to form part of the Nottinghamshire unitary authority, with the southern part forming part of the Greater Nottingham unitary authority.

Initial plans for the reorganisation scheduled elections for the unitary authorities in May 2027 which entailed Broxtowe's election being cancelled. Following the receipt of legal advice the Ministry of Housing, Communities and Local Government confirmed that the 2027 elections would take place on current local government boundaries.

== Previous council composition ==
After 2023 election		Before 2027 election	
Party	Seats	Party	Seats
Broxtowe Alliance	N/A	Broxtowe Alliance	19
Conservative	10	Conservative	10
Labour	26	Labour	7
Broxtowe Independent Group	N/A	Broxtowe Independent Group	5
Liberal Democrats	5	Liberal Democrats	3
Independent	3	Independent	0

Changes 2023—2027:

- August 2023: Barbara Carr (Liberal Democrats) and Stephen Carr (Liberal Democrats) leave party to sit as independents
- March 2024: Richard Falvey (Labour) resigns — by-election held May 2024
- May 2024: Tyler Marsh (Labour) wins by-election
- December 2024: Broxtowe Independent Group formed — five independent councillors join party (Note: Barbara Carr, Stephen Carr, Donna MacRae, Richard MacRae, and Elizabeth Williamson.)
- January 2025: Broxtowe Alliance formed — eighteen Labour councillors join party (Note: Ross Bofinger, Robert Bullock, Gabrielle Bunn, Chris Carr, Teresa Cullen, Shaun Dannheimer, Katherine Harlow, Stephen Jeremiah, Greg Marshall, John McGrath, Sue Paterson, Milan Radulovic, Helen Skinner, Pauline Smith, Vanessa Smith, Colin Tideswell, Sarah Webb, and Ken Woodhead.)
- June 2025: Tyler Marsh (Labour) joins Broxtowe Alliance
- July 2025: Graham Hills (Conservative) resigns — by-election held August 2025
- August 2025:
  - Judy Couch (Conservative) wins by-election
  - Ross Bofinger (Broxtowe Alliance) dies — by-election held December 2025
- December 2025: Sarah Camplin (Broxtowe Alliance) wins by-election
