= Broxtowe Borough Council elections =

Local government elections in Nottinghamshire, England

Broxtowe Borough Council elections are held every four years. Broxtowe Borough Council is the local authority for the non-metropolitan district of Borough of Broxtowe in Nottinghamshire, England. Since the full review of boundaries in 2015, 44 councillors are elected from 20 wards.

== Council elections ==
- 1973 Broxtowe District Council election
- 1976 Broxtowe Borough Council election (New ward boundaries)
- 1979 Broxtowe Borough Council election
- 1983 Broxtowe Borough Council election
- 1987 Broxtowe Borough Council election (Borough boundary changes took place but the number of seats remained the same)
- 1991 Broxtowe Borough Council election
- 1995 Broxtowe Borough Council election (Borough boundary changes took place but the number of seats remained the same)
- 1999 Broxtowe Borough Council election – Labour 27, Liberal Democrats 11, Conservative 10, Independent 1
- 2003 Broxtowe Borough Council election (New ward boundaries) – Labour 15, Conservative 14, Liberal Democrats 13, Independent 2
- 2007 Broxtowe Borough Council election – Conservative 16, Liberal Democrats 15, Labour 10 (including the results of a delayed election), Independent 2, British National Party 1
- 2011 Broxtowe Borough Council election
- 2015 Broxtowe Borough Council election (New ward boundaries)
- 2019 Broxtowe Borough Council election
- 2023 Broxtowe Borough Council election

== Borough result maps ==
2003 results map

2007 results map

2011 results map

2015 results map

2019 results map

2023 results map

=== Wards ===
Since boundary changes in 2015, 44 councillors have been elected from 20 wards. Each ward returns one to three councillors to the Borough Council, depending on the ward's electorate/population. Below is a summary list of the 20 wards and the number of councillors they each elect in brackets.

- Attenborough and Chilwell East (3) †
- Awsworth Cossall and Trowell(2)
- Beeston Central (2) †
- Beeston North (2) † - includes a very small part of Wollaton
- Beeston Rylands (2) †
- Beeston West (2) †
- Bramcote (3) † - includes a small part of Wollaton
- Brinsley (1)
- Chilwell West (3) †
- Eastwood Hall (1)
- Eastwood Hill Top (2)
- Eastwood St Mary's (2)
- Greasley (3)
- Kimberley (3)
- Nuthall East & Strelley (2)
- (Watnall) & Nuthall West (2)
- Stapleford North (2)
- Stapleford South East (2)
- Stapleford South West (2)
- Toton & Chilwell Meadows (3) †

† These wards form the unparished area of the borough.

== By-election results ==
By-elections take place when a vacancy occurs between the regular four-yearly elections.

=== 1995–1999 ===
Beeston Central By-Election 7 May 1998
Party	Candidate	Votes	%	±%
Labour		760	45.0	−10.5
Conservative		632	37.4	+9.8
Liberal Democrats		296	17.5	+8.6
Majority		128	7.6	
Turnout		1,688		
Labour hold		Swing		

=== 1999–2003 ===
Chilwell East By-Election 9 September 1999
Party	Candidate	Votes	%	±%
Conservative		789	49.6	+5.9
Labour		627	39.4	−5.7
Liberal Democrats		95	6.0	−5.2
Green		79	5.0	+5.0
Majority		162	10.2	
Turnout		1,590		
Conservative gain from Labour		Swing		

Greasley By-Election 23 March 2000
Party	Candidate	Votes	%	±%
Conservative		920	56.8	+5.6
Labour		459	28.3	−20.5
Independent		123	7.6	+7.6
Liberal Democrats		118	7.3	+7.3
Majority		461	28.5	
Turnout		1,620	19.7	
Conservative hold		Swing		

=== 2003–2007 ===
Stapleford South West By-Election 11 August 2005
Party	Candidate	Votes	%	±%
Labour	John Bell	406	39.2	−1.8
Liberal Democrats	Rakesh Sharma	353	34.0	−9.7
Conservative	Simon Tonks	278	26.8	+11.5
Majority		53	5.2	
Turnout		1,037	26.9	
Labour gain from Liberal Democrats		Swing		

=== 2007–2011 ===
Beeston Central By-Election 7 June 2007 (2 seats delayed election)
Party	Candidate	Votes	%	±%
Labour	Lynda Lally	728		
Labour	Pat Lally	677		
Conservative	Simon Tonks	498		
Conservative	Justin Hume	481		
Liberal Democrats	Paul Fox	160		
Liberal Democrats	Christine Wombwell	142		
Green	Mary Venning	75		
Green	Adrian Williams	59		
UKIP	Keith Marriott	56		
UKIP	Christopher Cobb	47		
Turnout		2,923	47.6	
Labour hold		Swing		
Labour hold		Swing		

Greasley (Giltbrook and Newthorpe) By-Election 26 February 2009
Party	Candidate	Votes	%	±%
Conservative	Penelope Stevens	1,125	49.1	+0.5
Labour	Edward Jacobs	600	26.2	+1.6
BNP	Wayne Shelbourn	301	13.1	−2.5
Liberal Democrats	Gwen Robb	232	10.1	−0.9
UKIP	Keith Marriott	31	1.4	+1.4
Majority		525	22.9	
Turnout		2,289	46.0	
Conservative hold		Swing		

Beeston North By-Election 4 June 2009
Party	Candidate	Votes	%	±%
Liberal Democrats	Barbara Carr	1,038	54.1	−3.7
Conservative	Philip Hopkinson	437	22.8	+5.2
Labour	Wayne Kirkham	272	14.2	−0.6
Green	Gordon Stoner	173	9.0	+2.0
Majority		601	31.3	
Turnout		1,920		
Liberal Democrats hold		Swing		

Brinsley By-Election 30 July 2009
Party	Candidate	Votes	%	±%
Conservative	John Booth	416	40.9	+40.9
BNP	Jamina Brown	288	28.3	−15.7
Liberal Democrats	Stuart Hosker	224	22.0	+22.0
Labour	Edward Jacobs	68	6.7	−22.9
UKIP	Keith Marriott	21	2.1	+2.1
Majority		128	12.6	
Turnout		1,017		
Conservative gain from BNP		Swing		

Toton and Chilwell Meadows By-Election 24 September 2009
Party	Candidate	Votes	%	±%
Conservative	Marilyn Hegyi	1,081	56.6	+8.3
Liberal Democrats	Robert Pembleton	474	24.8	−0.3
Labour	Atul Joshi	296	15.5	+1.3
BNP	David Brown	58	3.0	−4.1
Majority		607	31.8	
Turnout		1,909		
Conservative hold		Swing		

Eastwood South By-Election 25 February 2010
Party	Candidate	Votes	%	±%
Liberal Democrats	Keith Longdon	985	53.1	+34.0
Labour	Kenneth Woodhead	484	26.1	−12.1
Conservative	Adrian Limb	387	20.9	−0.4
Majority		501	27.0	
Turnout		1,856		
Liberal Democrats gain from Labour		Swing		

=== 2011–2015 ===
Toton and Chilwell Meadows By-Election 15 March 2012
Party	Candidate	Votes	%	±%
Conservative	Halimah Khaled	831	47.6	−1.1
Labour	Jane Marshall	385	22.1	−7.4
Liberal Democrats	Barbara Carr	300	17.2	+5.2
UKIP	Keith Marriott	228	13.1	+3.4
Majority		446	25.6	
Turnout		1,744	28.1	
Conservative hold		Swing		

Toton and Chilwell Meadows By-Election 11 December 2014
Party	Candidate	Votes	%	±%
Conservative	Mia Kee	952	54.5	+5.8
Labour	David Patrick	454	26.0	+3.9
UKIP	Darryl Paxford	340	19.5	+9.8
Majority		498	28.5	
Turnout		1,746		
Conservative hold		Swing		

=== 2015–2019 ===
Greasley By-Election 18 February 2016
Party	Candidate	Votes	%	±%
Conservative	Eddie Cubley	656	48.8	+0.8
Labour	Chris Chandler	300	22.3	−3.4
UKIP	Tracey Cahill	230	13.1	−2.6
Liberal Democrats	Keith Longdon	158	11.8	+5.3
Majority		356	26.5	
Turnout		1,344		
Conservative hold		Swing		

Toton and Chilwell Meadows By-Election 18 February 2016
Party	Candidate	Votes	%	±%
Conservative	Stephanie Kerry	910	51.9	+7.0
Labour	Lisa Clarke	368	21.0	−0.2
Liberal Democrats	Graham Heal	363	20.7	+20.7
Green	Gordon Stoner	111	6.3	−3.7
Majority		542	30.9	
Turnout		1,752		
Conservative hold		Swing		

Toton and Chilwell Meadows By-Election 8 June 2017
Party	Candidate	Votes	%	±%
Conservative	Lee Fletcher	2,471	49.3	+4.4
Labour	David Patrick	1,573	31.4	+10.2
Liberal Democrats	Graham Heal	624	12.5	+12.5
Green	Gordon Stoner	180	3.6	−6.4
UKIP	Chris Cobb	163	3.3	−9.9
Majority		898	17.9	
Turnout		5,011		
Conservative hold		Swing		

=== 2019–2023 ===
Beeston Rylands By-Election 6 May 2021
Party	Candidate	Votes	%	±%
Labour	Shaun Dannheimer	709	44.6	−2.9
Conservative	Duncan McCann	545	34.3	+14.0
Green	Gordon Stoner	183	11.5	−5.0
Liberal Democrats	Hugh Angseesing	154	9.7	−6.1
Majority		164	10.3	
Turnout		1,591		
Labour hold		Swing		

Stapleford South West By-Election 6 May 2021
Party	Candidate	Votes	%	±%
Labour	Sue Paterson	696	47.7	+3.4
Independent	Donna MacRae	305	20.9	+20.9
Conservative	Kash Purewal	287	19.7	+5.0
Liberal Democrats	Jess Hallam	170	11.7	−8.5
Majority		391	26.8	
Turnout		1,458		
Labour hold		Swing		

Greasley By-Election 10 November 2022
Party	Candidate	Votes	%	±%
Conservative	Linsey Ellis	637	47.7	−16.2
Labour	Danny Hall	555	41.6	+5.5
Liberal Democrats	Reece Oliver	143	10.7	+10.7
Majority		82	6.1	
Turnout		1,335		
Conservative hold		Swing		

=== 2023–2027 ===
Attenborough and Chilwell East By-Election 2 May 2024
Party	Candidate	Votes	%	±%
Labour	Tyler Marsh	1,320	46.0	
Conservative	Eric Kerry	978	34.1	
Green	Mary Venning	369	12.9	
Liberal Democrats	Simon Roche	201	7.0	
Majority		342	11.9	
Turnout		2,868		
Labour hold		Swing		

Nuthall East and Strelley By-Election 28 August 2025
Party	Candidate	Votes	%	±%
Conservative	Judy Couch	405	28.6	
Reform	Neil Isted	400	28.3	
Broxtowe Alliance	Graham Lambert	275	19.4	
Labour	Domenica Lopinto	244	17.2	
Green	Rachel Gravett	70	4.9	
Independent	Tyrone Gall	21	1.5	
Majority		5	0.4	
Turnout		1,415		
Conservative hold		Swing		

Stapleford South East By-Election 4 December 2025
Party	Candidate	Votes	%	±%
Broxtowe Alliance	Sarah Camplin	388	34.6	
Reform	Sunny Limbachia	245	21.9	
Liberal Democrats	Simon Roche	149	13.3	
Labour	Keith Bacon	128	11.4	
Conservative	Bradley Bell	108	9.6	
Independent	Lorraine Gerry	103	9.2	
Majority		143	12.8	
Turnout		1,121		
Broxtowe Alliance gain from Labour		Swing		
