= 2025 Nottinghamshire County Council election =

2025 English local election

- 1 May 2025

All 66 seats on Nottinghamshire County Council 34 seats needed for a majority

	First party	Second party	Third party
Leader	Mick Barton	Sam Smith	Kate Foale
Party	Reform	Conservative	Labour
Leader's seat	Mansfield East	Newark East	Beeston Central & Rylands (defeated)
Last election	0	37	15
Seats before	1	34	14
Seats won	40	17	4
Seat change	▲39	▼17	▼10
	Fourth party	Fifth party	Sixth party
Leader	Jason Zadrozny	Milan Radulovic	Richard Macrae
Party	Ashfield Ind.	Broxtowe Alliance	Broxtowe Independent Group
Leader's seat	Ashfields (defeated)	Eastwood (defeated)	Stapleford and Broxtowe Central (defeated)
Last election	10	0	1
Seats before	10	1	3
Seats won	1	1	1
Seat change	▼9	0	▼2
- Map showing the results of the 2025 Nottinghamshire County Council election
Leader before election
Sam Smith
Conservative
Leader after election
Mick Barton
Reform

The 2025 Nottinghamshire County Council election took place on 1 May 2025 to elect members to Nottinghamshire County Council in Nottinghamshire, England. All 66 seats were elected. This was on the same day as other local elections.

Reflecting national trends, the Conservatives, which had regained overall control of the council in the previous local election, experienced a significant loss of seats, resulting in the loss of its majority to Reform UK. The Labour Party also saw a substantial reduction in its representation, retaining only a third of its previous seats. In a rare positive outcome for the Conservatives on the day, the party recorded its sole net gain nationwide in Nottinghamshire, where Janette Barlow won the Collingham ward from independent councillor Debbie Darby.

== Previous council composition ==
After 2021 election		Before 2025 election	
Party	Seats	Party	Seats
Conservative	37	Conservative	34
Labour	15	Labour	14
Ashfield Ind.	10	Ashfield Ind.	10
Broxtowe Independent Group	0	Broxtowe Independent Group	3
Reform	0	Reform	1
Broxtowe Alliance	0	Broxtowe Alliance	1
Liberal Democrats	1	Liberal Democrats	0
Independent	3	Independent	3

=== Changes 2021–2025 ===
- October 2021: Francis Purdue-Horan (Conservative) expelled from party
- December 2021: Maureen Dobson (independent) dies; by-election held February 2022
- February 2022: Debbie Darby (independent) wins by-election
- August 2022: Eddie Cubley (Conservative) dies; by-election held November 2022
- November 2022: Kane Oliver (independent) gains by-election from Conservatives
- April 2023: Daniel Williamson (Ashfield Independents) resigns; by-election held May 2023
- May 2023: Rachel Madden (Ashfield Independents) wins by-election
- August 2023: Steve Carr (Liberal Democrats) leaves party to sit as an independent
- June 2024: John Doddy (Conservative) expelled from party
- January 2025: John McGrath (Labour) leaves party to sit as an independent; John Doddy (independent) joins Reform UK
- February 2025: Broxtowe Alliance formed — John McGrath (independent) joins party; Broxtowe Independent Group formed — Steve Carr (independent), Kane Oliver (independent) and Elizabeth Williamson (independent) join party

== Summary ==
=== Election result ===
2025 Nottinghamshire County Council election
Party	Candidates	Seats	Gains	Losses	Net gain/loss	Seats %	Votes %	Votes	+/−
Reform	64	40	39	0	+39	60.61	36.3	100,673	+36.0%
Conservative	64	17	1	20	-19	25.76	20.9	57,891	-21.9%
Labour	64	4	1	1	-10	6.06	19.4	53,693	-12.3%
Ashfield Ind.	10	1	0	9	-9	1.52	3.8	10,586	-2.8%
Broxtowe Alliance	6	1	1	1	0	1.52	2.2	6,218	+2.2%
Broxtowe Independent Group	4	1	1	2	-2	1.52	1.6	4,466	+1.6%
Green	52	0	0	0	0	0	6.1	16,807	+1.4%
Liberal Democrats	45	0	0	1	-1	0	5.5	15,301	-0.3%
Independent	20	0	0	-3	-3	0	3.7	10,148	-2.4%
Rushcliffe Independents	8	0	0	0	0	0	0.5	1,342	+0.5
TUSC	6	0	0	0	0	0	0.1	362	-0.2
SDP	1	0	0	0	0	0	0.0	25	
Alliance for Democracy and Freedom (UK)	1	0	0	0	0	0	0.0	12	

The above figures do not include the countermanded election in Mansfield North due to take place in June 2025

== Candidates by electoral division ==
=== Ashfield District ===
(10 seats, 10 electoral divisions)

Ashfield District
Party	Candidates						Votes		
Party	Stood	Elected	Gained	Unseated	Net	% of total	%	No.	Net %
Reform	10	9	9	0	▲9	90.0	50.0	17,395	N/A
Ashfield Ind.	10	1	0	9	▼9	10.0	30.4	10,586	▼27.0
Labour	10	0	0	0	Steady	0.0	10.7	3,720	▼6.7
Conservative	10	0	0	0	Steady	0.0	4.9	1,708	▼19.9
Green	5	0	0	0	Steady	0.0	2.2	755	N/A
Independent	2	0	0	0	Steady	0.0	1.0	347	N/A
Liberal Democrats	2	0	0	0	Steady	0.0	0.9	305	▲0.4

Ashfield Turnout
Registered electors	94,519
Votes cast	34,824
Turnout	36.8% (▲+1.2)

==== Ashfields ====
Ashfields
Party	Candidate	Votes	%	±%
Reform	Alan Bite	1,687	51.5	N/A
Ashfield Ind.	Jason Zadrozny (inc)	1,015	31.0	▼−32.8
Labour	John Coxhead	311	9.5	▼−6.4
Independent	Kerry Thornton	183	5.6	N/A
Conservative	Dawn Hodgman	81	2.5	▼−17.8
Turnout		3,277	36.7	▲+2.6
Registered electors		8,928		
Reform gain from Ashfield Ind.		Swing		

==== Hucknall North ====
Hucknall North
Party	Candidate	Votes	%	±%
Ashfield Ind.	John Wilmott (inc)	1,231	39.8	▼−17.2
Reform	Sean Neale	1,001	32.4	N/A
Labour	Aimee Kimpton	438	14.2	▼−4.0
Conservative	Rachel Kotze	244	7.9	▼−14.5
Liberal Democrats	Martin Howes	178	5.8	▲+3.4
Turnout		3,093	36.7	▲+2.6
Registered electors		8,431		
Ashfield Ind. hold		Swing		

==== Hucknall South ====
Hucknall South
Party	Candidate	Votes	%	±%
Reform	Darro Darrington	1,289	40.8	N/A
Ashfield Ind.	Lee Waters (inc)	1,081	34.2	▼−21.0
Labour	Patrick Ayres	457	14.5	▼−7.1
Conservative	Jan Lees	208	6.6	▼−14.4
Liberal Democrats	James Harvey	127	4.0	▲+1.8
Turnout		3,162	32.7	▼−1.6
Registered electors		9,660		
Reform gain from Ashfield Ind.		Swing		

==== Hucknall West ====
Hucknall West
Party	Candidate	Votes	%	±%
Reform	Chris Adegoke	1,208	38.9	N/A
Ashfield Ind.	David Paul Shaw (inc)	844	27.2	▼−25.6
Conservative	Kevin Rostance	510	16.4	▼−18.7
Labour	Joe Watkinson	377	12.1	Steady
Independent	Baz Duckhouse	164	5.3	N/A
Turnout		3,103	32.7	▼−5.5
Registered electors		9,503		
Reform gain from Ashfield Ind.		Swing		

==== Kirkby North ====
Kirkby North
Party	Candidate	Votes	%	±%
Reform	Simon Wright	1,604	52.1	N/A
Ashfield Ind.	Andy Meakin (inc)	1,105	35.9	▼−35.7
Labour	Sean White	294	9.5	▼−6.3
Conservative	Christine Self	78	2.5	▼−10.0
Turnout		3,080	34.2	▲+2.3
Registered electors		8,995		
Reform gain from Ashfield Ind.		Swing		

==== Kirkby South ====
Kirkby South
Party	Candidate	Votes	%	±%
Reform	Rory Green	2,082	55.8	N/A
Ashfield Ind.	Christopher Huskinson	864	23.2	▼−35.0
Labour	Julia Long	528	14.2	▼−8.3
Green	Paul Linfield	154	4.1	N/A
Conservative	Jeffrey Self	101	2.7	▼−16.6
Turnout		3,733	39.0	▲+1.8
Registered electors		9,574		
Reform gain from Ashfield Ind.		Swing		

==== Selston ====
Selston
Party	Candidate	Votes	%	±%
Reform	Dawn Justice	2,398	57.0	N/A
Ashfield Ind.	David Martin (inc)	1,156	27.5	▼−17.6
Labour	Tai Adegbite	279	6.6	▼−3.4
Green	Margaret Wilson	201	4.8	N/A
Conservative	Will Grover	175	4.2	▼−40.7
Turnout		4,211	42.0	▲+0.5
Registered electors		10,022		
Reform gain from Ashfield Ind.		Swing		

==== Sutton Central & East ====
Sutton Central and East
Party	Candidate	Votes	%	±%
Reform	Joseph Rich	1,644	51.7	N/A
Ashfield Ind.	Paul Craddock	950	29.9	▼−30.0
Labour	Ethan Revill	293	9.2	▼−10.2
Conservative	Jack Middleton	146	4.6	▼−16.1
Green	Alice Weaver	146	4.6	N/A
Turnout		3,179	34.0	▲+3.5
Registered electors		9,362		
Reform gain from Ashfield Ind.		Swing		

==== Sutton North ====
Sutton North
Party	Candidate	Votes	%	±%
Reform	Cathy Mason	2,362	59.0	N/A
Ashfield Ind.	Helen-Ann Smith	1,008	25.2	▼−36.2
Labour	George Watson	405	10.1	▼−5.5
Green	Arran Rangi	137	3.4	N/A
Conservative	Keith Townsend	91	2.3	▼−20.7
Turnout		4,003	39.2	▲+2.9
Registered electors		10,213		
Reform gain from Ashfield Ind.		Swing		

==== Sutton West ====
Sutton West
Party	Candidate	Votes	%	±%
Reform	Terry Cox	2,120	53.3	N/A
Ashfield Ind.	Tom Hollis (inc)	1,332	33.5	▼−21.7
Labour	Stefan Lamb	338	8.5	▼−15.5
Green	Elaine Havercroft	117	2.9	N/A
Conservative	Steve Walmsley	74	1.9	▼−18.9
Turnout		3,983	40.5	▲+4.5
Registered electors		9,831		
Reform gain from Ashfield Ind.		Swing		

=== Bassetlaw District ===
(9 seats, 9 electoral divisions)

Bassetlaw District
Party	Candidates						Votes		
Party	Stood	Elected	Gained	Unseated	Net	% of total	%	No.	Net %
Reform	9	8	8	0	▲8	88.9	45.1	14,046	▲44.0
Conservative	9	1	0	5	▼5	11.1	22.8	7,098	▼28.5
Labour	9	0	0	3	▼3	0.0	22.8	7,104	▼16.5
Liberal Democrats	9	0	0	0	Steady	0.0	6.1	1,915	▲1.3
Green	6	0	0	0	Steady	0.0	3.3	1,013	▲2.2

Bassetlaw Turnout
Registered electors	91,776
Votes cast	31,253
Turnout	34.1% (▲0.6)

==== Blyth & Harworth ====
Blyth & Harworth (1 seat)
Party	Candidate	Votes	%	±%
Reform	Hana John	1,540	49.6	N/A
Labour	Beverley Lynne Schuller	1,068	34.4	▼−12.7
Conservative	Steve Pashley	278	9.0	▼−29.7
Liberal Democrats	Peter Thompson	113	3.6	▲+1.7
Green	Heather Finley	103	3.3	N/A
Majority				
Turnout		3,105	28.7	▲+0.1
Registered electors				
Reform gain from Labour		Swing		

==== Misterton ====
Misterton (1 seat)
Party	Candidate	Votes	%	±%
Reform	Mike Robertson	1,962	45.5	N/A
Conservative	Tracey Taylor (inc)	1,290	29.9	▼−41.1
Labour	Rhona Collins	635	14.7	▼−7.3
Green	Rachel Reeves	221	5.1	N/A
Liberal Democrats	Andrew Davies	203	4.7	▼−2.3
Majority				
Turnout		4,322	39.8	▲+1.4
Registered electors				
Reform gain from Conservative		Swing		

==== Retford East ====
Retford East (1 seat)
Party	Candidate	Votes	%	±%
Conservative	Mike Introna (inc)	1,317	37.8	▼−11.9
Reform	Andrew McCallum	1,135	32.6	▲+29.1
Labour	Sue Shaw	701	20.1	▼−23.1
Green	David Bean	181	5.2	N/A
Liberal Democrats	Jennie Coggles	150	4.3	▲+0.7
Majority				
Turnout		3,490	36.8	▲1.3
Registered electors				
Conservative hold		Swing		

==== Retford West ====
Retford West (1 seat)
Party	Candidate	Votes	%	±%
Reform	Daniel Carl Saban	1,276	37.9	▲+35.1
Conservative	Mike Quigley (inc)	866	25.8	▼−19.2
Labour	Piers Digby	732	21.8	▼−16.2
Liberal Democrats	Helen Tamblyn-Saville	489	14.5	▲+0.7
Majority				
Turnout		3,381	34.3	▼−0.2
Registered electors				
Reform gain from Conservative		Swing		

==== Tuxford ====
Tuxford (1 seat)
Party	Candidate	Votes	%	±%
Reform	Warren Limber	1,502	42.0	N/A
Conservative	Emma Griffin	1,264	35.3	▼−31.3
Labour	Ian Warton-Woods	455	12.7	▼−6.3
Green	Denise Taylor-Roome	194	5.4	▼−3.5
Liberal Democrats	Kristian Langrick	162	4.5	▼−1.0
Majority				
Turnout		3,585	39.0	▼−0.3
Registered electors				
Reform gain from Conservative		Swing		

==== Worksop East ====
Worksop East (1 seat)
Party	Candidate	Votes	%	±%
Reform	Russell Dodd	1,392	52.7	N/A
Labour	Glynn Gilfoyle (inc)	824	31.2	▼−24.2
Conservative	Andy Tyler	207	7.8	▼−27.5
Liberal Democrats	Leon Duveen	126	4.8	▲+1.1
Green	Margaret Hamilton	91	3.4	N/A
Majority				
Turnout		2,644	27.4	▲+1.1
Registered electors				
Reform gain from Labour		Swing		

==== Worksop North ====
Worksop North (1 seat)
Party	Candidate	Votes	%	±%
Reform	Kevin Dale	1,650	47.2	▲+44.6
Conservative	Callum Bailey (inc)	824	23.6	▼−26.2
Labour	Neil Sanders	808	23.1	▼−22.2
Liberal Democrats	Steffi Harangozo	213	6.1	▲+3.8
Majority				
Turnout		3,506	34.1	▼−1.0
Registered electors				
Reform gain from Conservative		Swing		

==== Worksop South ====
Worksop South (1 seat)
Party	Candidate	Votes	%	±%
Reform	Kelvin Wright	1,622	47.1	N/A
Labour	Charles Adams	965	28.0	▼−14.2
Conservative	Nigel Turner (inc)	616	17.9	▼−32.2
Liberal Democrats	Phil Ray	242	7.0	N/A
Majority				
Turnout		3,456	35.9	▲+1.0
Registered electors				
Reform gain from Conservative		Swing		

==== Worksop West ====
Worksop West (1 seat)
Party	Candidate	Votes	%	±%
Reform	Bert Bingham	1,967	52.3	N/A
Labour	Sybil Fielding (inc)	916	24.4	▼−27.1
Conservative	James Purle	436	11.6	▼−32.3
Green	Olive Welch	223	5.9	N/A
Liberal Democrats	Simon Russell	217	5.8	▲1.2
Majority				
Turnout		3,764	31.3	▲+1.7
Registered electors				
Reform gain from Labour		Swing		

=== Broxtowe Borough ===
(9 seats, 7 electoral divisions)

Broxtowe Borough
Party	Candidates						Votes		
Party	Stood	Elected	Gained	Unseated	Net	% of total	%	No.	Net %
Reform	9	6	6	0	▲6	66.7	28.5	13,445	▲28.5
Labour	9	1	1	2	▼1	11.1	16.6	7,827	▼5.5
Conservative	9	0	0	5	▼5	0.0	16.1	7,623	▼36.8
Broxtowe Alliance	6	1	1	0	▲1	11.1	13.2	6,218	▲13.2
Broxtowe Independent Group	4	1	1	0	▲1	11.1	9.5	4,466	▲9.5
Liberal Democrats	9	0	0	1	▼1	0.0	9.3	4,380	▲2.4
Green	8	0	0	0	0	0.0	6.7	3,182	▼1.3
Independent	1	0	0	1	▼1	0.0	0.1	67	▼9.2

Broxtowe Turnout
Registered electors	85,770
Votes cast	33,428
Turnout	39.0% (▼-3.9)

==== Beeston Central & Rylands ====
Beeston Central and Rylands
Party	Candidate	Votes	%	±%
Broxtowe Alliance	Teresa Cullen	1,035	26.9	N/A
Labour	Kate Foale (inc)	1,008	26.2	▼−26.4
Reform	Neil Isted	798	20.7	N/A
Conservative	Andrew Askham	431	11.2	▼−17.0
Green	Tom Stanton	391	10.1	▼−1.2
Liberal Democrats	Patricia Taylor	191	5.0	▼−2.9
Turnout		3,854	37.9	▼−5.3
Registered electors		10,173		
Broxtowe Alliance gain from Labour		Swing		

==== Bramcote & Beeston North ====
Bramcote and Beeston North
Party	Candidate	Votes	%	±%
Broxtowe Independent Group	Steve Carr (inc)	2,104	47.5	N/A
Liberal Democrats	Stan Heptinstall	606	13.7	▼−28.7
Labour	Holly Woodford	570	12.9	▼−12.3
Reform	Agostino Maurotto	550	12.4	N/A
Conservative	Sunny Limbachia	321	7.2	▼−17.9
Green	Gordon Stoner	279	6.3	Steady
Turnout		4,430	45.1	▼−5.3
Registered electors		9,823		
Broxtowe Independent Group gain from Liberal Democrats		Swing		

==== Eastwood ====
Eastwood
Party	Candidate	Votes	%	±%
Reform	James Walker-Gurley	1,326	42.4	N/A
Broxtowe Alliance	Milan Radulovic	898	28.7	N/A
Labour	Will Mee	411	13.2	▼−28.6
Conservative	Kieran Phelan	256	8.2	▼−38.2
Liberal Democrats	Josie Marsters	131	4.2	▼−2.7
Green	Rose Woods	103	3.3	▼−1.7
Turnout		3,125	33.2	▲+1.2
Registered electors		9,423		
Reform gain from Conservative		Swing		

The incumbent councillor, Kane Oliver (Broxtowe Independent Group) had been elected in a by-election as an independent.

==== Greasley & Brinsley ====
Greasley and Brinsley
Party	Candidate	Votes	%	±%
Reform	Glyn Pepper	1,679	44.4	N/A
Conservative	Kashmir Purewal	690	18.3	▼−16.5
Broxtowe Independent Group	Kane Oliver	487	12.9	N/A
Labour	Nick Evans	483	12.8	▲+1.2
Green	Pat Morton	290	7.7	▲+3.6
Liberal Democrats	Andy Kingdon	151	4.0	▲+2.5
Turnout		3,778	38.4	▼−5.8
Registered electors		9,847		
Reform gain from Independent		Swing		

==== Nuthall & Kimberley ====
Nuthall and Kimberley
Party	Candidate	Votes	%	±%
Reform	James Rawson	1,253	33.9	N/A
Conservative	Philip Owen (inc)	1,086	29.3	▼−17.0
Labour	Peter Bales	804	21.7	▼−3.2
Broxtowe Alliance	David Kirwan	287	7.8	N/A
Green	Rachel Gravett	165	4.5	▲+1.0
Liberal Democrats	Jo Cooke	106	2.9	▼−0.8
Turnout		3,701	36.0	▼−4.8
Registered electors		10,279		
Reform gain from Conservative		Swing		

==== Stapleford & Broxtowe Central ====
Stapleford and Broxtowe Central
Party	Candidate	Votes	%	±%
Reform	Dr John Doddy (inc)	2,372	36.8	N/A
Reform	Jan Goold	2,059	32.0	N/A
Broxtowe Independent Group	Richard MacRae	1,279	19.9	N/A
Broxtowe Alliance	Maggie McGrath (inc)	943	14.6	N/A
Labour	Keith Bacon	829	12.9	▼−17.1
Conservative	Thomas Hall	829	12.9	▼−24.2
Conservative	Bradley Bell	792	12.3	▼−12.1
Liberal Democrats	Hannah Land	728	11.3	▼−3.5
Liberal Democrats	David Watts	709	11.0	▼−1.3
Labour	Ellie Winfield	641	10.0	▼−13.0
Green	Teresa Needham	615	9.6	▲+0.5
Broxtowe Independent Group	Donna MacRae	596	9.3	N/A
Independent	John Longdon	67	1.0	▼−4.8
Turnout		6,439	37.2	▼−4.2
Registered electors		17,291		
Reform gain from Conservative		Swing		
Reform gain from Labour		Swing		

==== Toton, Chilwell & Attenborough ====
Toton, Chilwell and Attenborough
Party	Candidate	Votes	%	±%
Reform	Richard Lowe	1,807	22.3	N/A
Labour	Helen Faccio	1,684	20.8	▼−20.1
Conservative	Eric Kerry (inc)	1,637	20.2	▼−23.6
Reform	Philip West	1,601	19.8	N/A
Broxtowe Alliance	Shaun Dannheimer	1,587	19.6	N/A
Conservative	Richard Jackson (inc)	1,581	19.5	▼−24.3
Broxtowe Alliance	Stephen Jeremiah	1,468	18.1	N/A
Labour	Tom Newton	1,397	17.2	▼−14.4
Liberal Democrats	Simon Roche	892	11.0	▲+2.3
Liberal Democrats	James Collis	866	10.7	▲+3.3
Green	Charlie Harris	770	9.5	▼−5.0
Green	Simon Frost	569	7.0	N/A
Turnout		8,101	42.8	▼−3.1
Registered electors		18,934		
Reform gain from Conservative		Swing		
Labour gain from Conservative		Swing		

=== Gedling Borough ===
(9 seats, 6 electoral divisions)

Gedling Borough
Party	Candidates						Votes		
Party	Stood	Elected	Gained	Unseated	Net	% of total	%	No.	Net %
Reform	9	5	5	0	▲+5				
Labour	9	2	0	4	▼-4				
Conservative	9	2	0	1	▼-1				
Green	9								
Liberal Democrats	9								
Independent	9								

Gedling Turnout
Registered electors	91,919
Votes cast	31,395
Turnout	34.2% (▼-3.7)

==== Arnold North ====
Arnold North
Party	Candidate	Votes	%	±%
Reform	Wendy Lukacs	2,571	38.6	
Reform	John Semens	2,545	38.2	
Labour	Sarah O'Connor	1,978	29.7	
Labour	Henry Wheeler	1,929	28.9	
Conservative	Darren Maltby	1,193	17.9	
Conservative	Edward Jayamaha	1,139	17.1	
Liberal Democrats	Tad Jones	480	7.2	
Green	Margret Vince	445	6.7	
Green	Jim Stuart	437	6.6	
Liberal Democrats	Patrick Shannon	364	5.5	
Turnout		6,667	32.7	▼−5.6
Registered electors		20,380		
Reform gain from Labour		Swing		
Reform gain from Labour		Swing		

==== Arnold South ====
Arnold South
Party	Candidate	Votes	%	±%
Labour	John Clarke (inc)	2,531	36.1	
Labour	Liz Clunie	2,435	34.7	
Reform	Alisha Chambers	2,035	29.0	
Reform	Steve Higgins	2,021	28.8	
Conservative	Mark Dillon	978	13.9	
Conservative	Tracy Maltby	936	13.3	
Green	Tony Burnett	696	9.9	
Green	Adam Chadwick	656	9.3	
Liberal Democrats	Andrew Ellwood	600	8.5	
Liberal Democrats	Robert Swift	568	8.1	
Independent	Paul Key	188	2.7	
Turnout		7,018	34.4	▼−5.8
Registered electors		20,411		
Labour hold		Swing		
Labour hold		Swing		

==== Calverton ====
Calverton
Party	Candidate	Votes	%	±%
Reform	Jody Stoll	1,197	29.3	N/A
Independent	Andy Meads	1,033	25.3	N/A
Conservative	Boyd Bryan Elliott (inc)	922	22.6	▼−38.7
Labour	Dean Wilson	554	13.6	▲+1.4
Liberal Democrats	Maggie Dunkin	220	5.4	▲+0.5
Green	Oscar Power	162	4.0	▼−3.0
Turnout		4,088	36.4	▼−3.3
Registered electors		11,243		
Reform gain from Conservative		Swing		

==== Carlton East ====
Carlton East
Party	Candidate	Votes	%	±%
Conservative	Mike Adams (inc)	1,391	35.4	▼−10.9
Reform	Sam Boultby	858	21.8	N/A
Labour	Cate Carmichael	763	19.4	▼−26.3
Independent	Russell Whiting	615	15.6	N/A
Green	Ian Barlow	183	4.7	▲+0.1
Liberal Democrats	Richard Ian MacDuff Fife	121	3.1	▼−0.3
Turnout		3,931	36.6	▼−3.1
Registered electors		10,734		
Conservative hold		Swing		

==== Carlton West ====
Carlton West
Party	Candidate	Votes	%	±%
Reform	Paul Thomas Brill	2,399	38.7	N/A
Reform	Jim Vernon	2,230	36.0	N/A
Labour	Jim Creamer (inc)	1,642	26.5	▼−20.9
Labour	Errol Henry (inc)	1,567	25.3	▼−18.8
Liberal Democrats	Andrew Dunkin	982	15.9	▲+6.2
Liberal Democrats	Paul Hughes	865	14.0	▲+4.8
Conservative	Charlie Godwin	744	12.0	▼−24.2
Conservative	Carol Walker	655	10.6	▼−23.5
Green	Charlotte Leask	574	9.3	▲+1.2
Green	Will Richardson	376	6.1	N/A
Turnout		6,191	30.6	▼−1.7
Registered electors		20,215		
Reform gain from Labour		Swing		
Reform gain from Labour		Swing		

==== Newstead ====
Newstead
Party	Candidate	Votes	%	±%
Conservative	Stuart Bestwick	1,291	36.9	▼−30.7
Reform	Eddie Stubbs	1,290	36.9	N/A
Labour	John Taylor	502	14.3	▼−5.5
Liberal Democrats	John Sutherland	233	6.7	▲+1.4
Green	Ian Whitehead	184	5.3	▼−2.0
Turnout		3,500	39.2	▼−1.4
Registered electors		8,936		
Conservative hold		Swing		

=== Mansfield District ===
(9 seats, 5 electoral divisions)

Mansfield District
Party	Candidates						Votes		
Party	Stood	Elected	Gained	Unseated	Net	% of total	%	No.	Net %
Conservative	9								
Labour									
Green	5								
Mansfield Independent									
Reform									
TUSC									
Independent									

Mansfield Turnout
Registered electors
Votes cast
Turnout

==== Mansfield East ====
Mansfield East
Party	Candidate	Votes	%	±%
Reform	Mick Barton	3,653	61.0	N/A
Reform	Martin Wright	3,473	58.0	N/A
Labour	Alan Bell	948	15.8	▼−5.3
Conservative	Nigel Moxon (inc)	947	15.8	▼−20.1
Conservative	Robert Corden (inc)	927	15.5	▼−34.4
Labour	Jane Moody	927	15.5	▼−3.0
Green	Shaun Thornton	402	6.7	N/A
TUSC	Deborah Hodson	91	1.5	▲+0.1
Independent	Frank Karunaratne	39	0.7	N/A
Turnout		5,989	32.8	
Registered electors		18,253		
Reform gain from Conservative		Swing		
Reform gain from Conservative		Swing		

==== Mansfield North ====
The election in Mansfield North was countermanded following the death of the TUSC candidate Karen Seymour. The election for this division was subsequently re-organised and held on 12 June 2025.

Mansfield North
Party	Candidate	Votes	%	±%
Reform	Gaynor Mann	3,077		
Reform	David Smith	2,998		
Labour	Anne Callaghan	1,259		
Labour	Andy Abrahams	1,211		
Conservative	Tim Bower	500		
Conservative	Amy Clements	426		
Green	Chris Clarke	292		
TUSC	Milo Okonkwo-Tooley	62		
TUSC	Otis Okonkwo-Tooley	39		
Turnout		5,094	28	
Registered electors		18,008		
Reform gain from Conservative		Swing		
Reform gain from Labour		Swing		

==== Mansfield South ====
Mansfield South
Party	Candidate	Votes	%	±%
Reform	Kevin Brown	2,349	39.7	N/A
Reform	Faz Choudhury	2,027	34.3	N/A
Independent	Steve Garner (inc)	1,809	30.6	▼−2.7
Independent	Mark Garner	1,230	20.8	N/A
Conservative	Andre Camilleri (inc)	960	16.2	▼−14.1
Labour	Sharron Hartshorn	919	15.5	▼−8.4
Labour	Jacob Denness	907	15.3	▲+0.7
Conservative	Joshua Charles	669	11.3	▼−16.9
Green	Harry Thornton	366	6.2	N/A
TUSC	Denise Tooley-Okonkwo	66	1.1	▲+0.2
Turnout		5,913	30.5	
Registered electors		19,407		
Reform gain from Independent		Swing		
Reform gain from Conservative		Swing		

==== Mansfield West ====
Mansfield West
Party	Candidate	Votes	%	±%
Reform	Barry Answer	2,841	57.8	N/A
Reform	Brian Wheatcroft	2,342	47.7	N/A
Labour	Paul Henshaw (inc)	908	18.5	▼−9.3
Labour	Sue Swinscoe	838	17.1	▼−7.8
Independent	June Stendall	679	13.8	N/A
Conservative	Carl Husted	418	8.5	▼−22.4
Conservative	John Roughton	346	7.0	▼−15.0
Green	Philip Shields	324	6.6	N/A
Independent	Kier Barsby	276	5.6	▼−12.3
TUSC	Adam Brailsford	93	1.9	▲+0.2
TUSC	Lydia Smith	70	1.4	▲+0.2
Turnout		4,913	28.3	
Registered electors		17,334		
Reform gain from Conservative		Swing		
Reform gain from Labour		Swing		

==== Warsop ====
Warsop
Party	Candidate	Votes	%	±%
Reform	Andy McCormack	1,564	53.7	N/A
Labour	Nicola Hughes	797	27.4	▼−10.5
Conservative	Sam Collins	348	12.0	▼−28.1
Green	Tony Fawcett	180	6.2	N/A
TUSC	Paul Tooley-Okonkwo	21	0.7	▼−11.7
Turnout		2,910	30.9	
Registered electors		9,410		
Reform gain from Conservative		Swing		

=== Newark & Sherwood District ===
(10 seats, 10 electoral divisions)

Newark & Sherwood District
Party	Candidates						Votes		
Party	Stood	Elected	Gained	Unseated	Net	% of total	%	No.	Net %
Conservative	10	6	0	2	▼2	60%	33.6%	11,424	
Reform	10	4	4	0	▲4	40%	33.7%	11,440	
Labour	10	0	0	1	▼1	0%	13.8%	4,681	
Liberal Democrats	10	0	0	0	0	0%	7.5%	2,562	
Green	10	0	0	0	0	0%	6%	2,041	
Independent	5	0	0	0	0	0%	5.3%	1,807	
TUSC	1	0	0	0	0	0%	0.1%	21	

Newark & Sherwood Turnout
Registered electors	95,950
Votes cast	33,980
Turnout	35.4% (▼-1.8)

==== Balderton ====
Balderton
Party	Candidate	Votes	%	±%
Conservative	Johno Lee (inc)	1,351	45.5	▼−20.3
Reform	Brenda White	740	24.9	▲+22.3
Independent	Jean Hall	412	13.9	N/A
Labour	Jane Olson	264	8.9	▼−6.9
Green	Martin Lunn	113	3.8	▼−3.2
Liberal Democrats	Klaus Becher	87	2.9	▼−4.6
Turnout		2,967	32.9	▲+0.3
Registered electors		9,019		
Conservative hold		Swing		

==== Blidworth ====
Blidworth
Party	Candidate	Votes	%	±%
Reform	Richard Ward	1,122	40.7	N/A
Conservative	Tom Smith (inc)	914	33.2	▼−5.8
Independent	Francis Purdue-Horan	337	12.2	N/A
Labour	Angie Jackson	241	8.7	▼−12.6
Green	Nina Swanwick	76	2.8	▲+0.2
Liberal Democrats	Vivien Scorer	44	1.6	N/A
TUSC	Kirsty Denman	21	0.8	N/A
Turnout		2,755	31.8	▼−0.8
Registered electors		8,670		
Reform gain from Conservative		Swing		

==== Collingham ====
Collingham
Party	Candidate	Votes	%	±%
Conservative	Janette Barlow	999	29.2	▼−11.0
Reform	Darren Finch	983	28.7	N/A
Independent	Debbie Darby (inc)	728	21.3	N/A
Labour	Kevin Scoles	268	7.8	N/A
Liberal Democrats	Marylyn Rayner	254	7.4	N/A
Green	Bee Newboult	193	5.6	▼−4.6
Turnout		3,425	33.6	▼−4.1
Registered electors		10,181		
Conservative gain from Independent		Swing		

==== Farndon & Trent ====
Farndon and Trent
Party	Candidate	Votes	%	±%
Conservative	Sue Saddington (inc)	1,199	37.7	▼−23.2
Reform	Caroline Hinds	840	26.4	▲+24.7
Liberal Democrats	Keith Melton	411	12.9	▲+3.6
Labour	Laurence Goff	398	12.5	▼−6.3
Independent	Declan Logue	194	6.1	N/A
Green	Christine Platt	141	4.4	▼−3.1
Turnout		3,183	39.3	▼−2.6
Registered electors		8,091		
Conservative hold		Swing		

==== Muskham & Farnsfield ====
Muskham and Farnsfield
Party	Candidate	Votes	%	±%
Conservative	Bruce Laughton (inc)	1,786	38.5	▼−26.8
Reform	Jacqueline Gozzard	1,601	34.5	N/A
Labour	Shane Draper	616	13.3	▼−4.8
Liberal Democrats	Stuart Thompstone	352	7.6	0.0
Green	Maureen Tomeny	289	6.2	▼−2.8
Turnout		4,644	40.9	▼−1.7
Registered electors		11,363		
Conservative hold		Swing		

==== Newark East ====
Newark East
Party	Candidate	Votes	%	±%
Conservative	Sam Smith (inc)	935	34.9	▼−10.8
Reform	Daniel Challans	700	26.1	N/A
Green	Matt Spoors	516	19.3	▼−17.0
Labour	Lisa Geary	302	11.3	▼−6.8
Independent	Susan Crosby	136	5.1	N/A
Liberal Democrats	Chris Adams	91	3.4	N/A
Turnout		2,680	33.3	▼−1.0
Registered electors		8,049		
Conservative hold		Swing		

==== Newark West ====
Newark West
Party	Candidate	Votes	%	±%
Reform	Desmond Clarke	909	35.9	N/A
Conservative	Keith Girling (inc)	756	29.9	▼−17.7
Labour	Paul Taylor	508	20.1	▼−10.7
Green	Lucy Spoors	193	7.6	▼−0.8
Liberal Democrats	Rosemary Johnson-Sabine	164	6.5	Steady
Turnout		2,530	28.5	▼−1.4
Registered electors		8,875		
Reform gain from Conservative		Swing		

==== Ollerton ====
Ollerton
Party	Candidate	Votes	%	±%
Reform	David Clark	1,796	51.5	N/A
Labour	Mike Pringle (inc)	856	24.6	▼−23.3
Conservative	Marcus Jones	577	16.6	▼−28.0
Liberal Democrats	Peter Harris	136	3.9	▲+2.2
Green	Mike Poyzer	121	3.5	▲+0.7
Turnout		3,486	34.0	▲+0.9
Registered electors		10,249		
Reform gain from Labour		Swing		

==== Sherwood Forest ====
Sherwood Forest
Party	Candidate	Votes	%	±%
Reform	James Gamble	1,610	44.8	N/A
Conservative	Scott Carlton (inc)	1,139	31.7	▼−22.8
Labour	Caroline Ellis	595	16.5	▼−23.4
Green	Sheila Greatrex-White	157	4.4	▲+0.1
Liberal Democrats	Dave Dobbie	95	2.6	N/A
Turnout		3,600	34.3	▼−0.8
Registered electors		10,484		
Reform gain from Conservative		Swing		

==== Southwell ====
Southwell
Party	Candidate	Votes	%	±%
Conservative	Roger Jackson (inc)	1,768	37.5	▼−20.2
Reform	Lee Smith	1,139	24.2	N/A
Liberal Democrats	Karen Roberts	928	19.7	▼−4.5
Labour	Tracey Jevons-Hazzard	633	13.4	▼−3.3
Green	Steven Morris	242	5.1	N/A
Turnout		4,710	42.9	▼−6.2
Registered electors		10,969		
Conservative hold		Swing		

=== Rushcliffe Borough ===
(10 seats, 9 electoral divisions)

Rushcliffe Borough
Party	Candidates						Votes		
Party	Stood	Elected	Gained	Unseated	Net	% of total	%	No.	Net %
Conservative	10								
Green	10								
Labour	10								
Liberal Democrats									
Reform									
Rushcliffe Ind.									

Rushcliffe Turnout
Registered electors	95,031
Votes cast	38,690
Turnout	40.7% (▼-4.4)

==== Bingham East ====
Bingham East
Party	Candidate	Votes	%	±%
Conservative	Stephen Pearson	1,374	32.6	▼−17.0
Labour	Christopher Grocock	1,210	28.7	N/A
Reform	Helen Adcott	1,200	28.5	▲+25.9
Green	Emily Sivey	427	10.1	▼−6.2
Turnout		4,210	43.4	▼−2.1
Registered electors		9,694		
Conservative hold		Swing		

==== Bingham West ====
Bingham West
Party	Candidate	Votes	%	±%
Conservative	Neil Clarke (inc)	1,093	35.3	▼−22.9
Reform	Kevin Thompson	677	21.9	▲+18.2
Rushcliffe Ind.	Ted Birch	636	20.6	N/A
Labour	Tony Wallace	454	14.7	▼−6.2
Green	Amber Edwards-Smith	232	7.5	▼−1.9
Turnout		3,092	38.1	▼−1.1
Registered electors		8,121		
Conservative hold		Swing		

==== Cotgrave ====
Cotgrave
Party	Candidate	Votes	%	±%
Conservative	Richard Butler (inc)	1,151	36.5	▼−26.7
Rushcliffe Ind.	Keir Chewings	706	22.4	N/A
Reform	Keith Walters	664	21.1	N/A
Labour	Michael Symonds	370	11.7	▼−12.7
Green	Brennig Jones	137	4.3	▼−2.5
Liberal Democrats	Sara Dellar	111	3.5	▼−2.2
Alliance for Democracy (UK)	Teck Keong Khong	12	0.4	N/A
Turnout		3,151	36.4	▼−2.1
Registered electors		8,653		
Conservative hold		Swing		

==== Keyworth ====
Keyworth
Party	Candidate	Votes	%	±%
Conservative	John Cottee (inc)	1,833	44.0	▼−19.9
Reform	Darren Sharpe	746	17.9	N/A
Independent	Shelley Millband	536	12.9	N/A
Labour	James Coyle	429	10.3	▼−4.0
Liberal Democrats	Linda Abbey	370	8.9	▼−4.1
Green	Neil Pinder	248	6.0	▼−2.8
Turnout		4,162	44.2	▼−5.4
Registered electors		9,415		
Conservative hold		Swing		

==== Leake & Ruddington ====
Leake and Ruddington
Party	Candidate	Votes	%	±%
Conservative	Andy Brown	2,241	31.3	▼−15.9
Reform	Stuart Matthews	1,863	26.1	N/A
Conservative	Andy Edyvean	1,729	24.2	▼−21.5
Reform	Joseph Napier	1,707	23.9	N/A
Labour	Jen Walker	1,667	23.3	▼−9.9
Labour	Mike Gaunt	1,573	22.0	▼−9.4
Independent	Jason Billin	802	11.2	N/A
Green	Maria Sjogersten	707	9.9	▼−1.3
Independent	Will Birch	612	8.6	N/A
Green	Benjamin Woolley	454	6.3	N/A
Liberal Democrats	Michael Wright	433	6.1	▼−7.8
Turnout		7,150	38.7	▼−4.5
Registered electors		18,454		
Conservative hold		Swing		
Reform gain from Conservative		Swing		

==== Radcliffe On Trent ====
Radcliffe on Trent
Party	Candidate	Votes	%	±%
Conservative	Roger Upton (inc)	1,717	44.7	▼−9.7
Labour	John Hess	1,032	26.8	▼−8.0
Reform	Adrian Barker	689	17.9	N/A
Green	Rhiana Lakin	407	10.6	▲+4.2
Turnout		3,845	43.0	▼−4.7
Registered electors		8,942		
Conservative hold		Swing		

==== West Bridgford North ====
West Bridgford North
Party	Candidate	Votes	%	±%
Labour	Penny Gowland (inc)	1,518	36.3	▼−7.0
Green	Richard Mallender	1,257	30.1	▲+4.3
Conservative	Darius Furmonavicius	874	20.9	▼−6.3
Reform	Glen Hale	397	9.5	N/A
Liberal Democrats	Keith Jamieson	133	3.2	▼−0.5
Turnout		4,179	40.0	▼−9.0
Registered electors		10,435		
Labour hold		Swing		

==== West Bridgford South ====
West Bridgford South (1 seat)
Party	Candidate	Votes	%	±%
Conservative	Jonathan Wheeler	2,305	50.9	+0.8
Labour	Graham Johnson	1,003	22.2	−5.6
Reform	Maxwell Ronald Cooke	489	10.8	N/A
Green	Sue Mallender	422	9.3	−3.5
Liberal Democrats	Nancy Smith-Mitsch	282	6.2	−3.1
SDP	Anne McDonnell	25	0.6	N/A
Majority				
Turnout		4533	40.9	▼−4.9
Registered electors		11,090		
Conservative hold		Swing		

==== West Bridgford West ====
West Bridgford West (1 seat)
Party	Candidate	Votes	%	±%
Conservative	Hari Om	1,857	42.6	−0.5
Labour	Dora Polenta	960	22.0	−17.0
Green	Ben Gray	540	12.4	+5.3
Reform	Trevor Paul Lawton	520	11.9	+11.9
Liberal Democrats	Rod Jones	377	8.6	+1.7
Independent	Alan Phillips	108	2.5	+2.5
Majority				
Turnout		4368	42.7	−4.3
Registered electors		10,227		
Conservative hold		Swing		

== Aftermath ==
Reform UK took majority control with an overall majority of 6 seats. Reform's only county councillor prior to the election was John Doddy, who had been elected as a Conservative in 2021 but joined Reform UK earlier in 2025. Seven days after the election, the Reform UK councillor for Newark West, Desmond Clarke, resigned from the council.

After the election, Reform chose Mick Barton to be its new group leader. He was formally appointed as the new leader of the council at the subsequent annual council meeting on 22 May 2025.

== By-elections ==
=== Newark West ===
Newark West by-election: 4 July 2025
Party	Candidate	Votes	%	±%
Conservative	Keith Girling	680	34.7	+4.8
Reform	Caroline Hinds	672	34.3	–1.6
Labour	Paul Taylor	316	16.1	–4.0
Green	Matthew Spoors	190	9.7	+2.1
Liberal Democrats	Rosemary Johnson Sabine	90	4.6	–1.9
SDP	Andrew Leatherland	11	0.6	N/A
Majority		8	0.4	N/A
Turnout		1,959	22.0	–6.5
Registered electors		8,924		
Conservative gain from Reform		Swing	▲3.2	

=== Southwell ===
Southwell by-election: 29 October 2026
Party	Candidate	Votes	%	±%
Conservative	Penny Rainbow	2,019	45.3	+7.8
Reform	Eddie Stubbs	1159	26.0	+1.8
Labour	Tracey Jevons-Hazzard	646	14.5	+1.1
Liberal Democrats	Keith Melton	545	12.2	−7.5
Green	Matthew Thomson-Spoors	88	2.0	−3.1
Majority		860	19.3	+6.0
Turnout		4457	42.0	−0.9
Conservative hold		Swing	▲3.1	

== See also ==
- Nottinghamshire County Council elections
