= 2023 Broxtowe Borough Council election =

2023 English local election

- 4 May 2023

All 44 seats to Broxtowe Borough Council 23 seats needed for a majority

	First party	Second party
Leader	Milan Radulovic	Richard Jackson (defeated)
Party	Labour	Conservative
Seats before	14	20
Seats after	26	10
Seat change	▲12	▼10
Popular vote	31,430	20,092
	Third party	Fourth party
Leader	Steve Carr
Party	Liberal Democrats	Independent
Seats before	7	3
Seats after	5	3
Seat change	▼2	Steady
Popular vote	13,055	3,348
- The winner of each seat in the 2023 Broxtowe Borough Council Election
Leader before election
Milan Radulovic
Labour
No overall control
Leader after election
Milan Radulovic
Labour

The 2023 Broxtowe Borough Council election took place on 4 May 2023, to elect all 44 members of Broxtowe Borough Council in England. This took place as part of the 2023 United Kingdom local elections.

Prior to the election the council was under no overall control, being run by a coalition of Labour, Liberal Democrats and independent councillors, led by Labour group leader Milan Radulovic. This coalition had taken office following the previous 2019 election when the Conservatives had lost their majority.

Labour won a majority of the seats on the council in 2023. The leader of the Conservative group, Richard Jackson, lost his seat after a tiebreak settled by drawing names from a box.

== Background ==
Broxtowe is one of the seven non-metropolitan districts that make up Nottinghamshire County Council. Since its creation in 1973, the Conservatives have typically been the largest party. The Conservatives controlled the council until 1995, when Labour won control. It fell into no overall control in 2003, before the Conservatives regained control in 2015. Following elections in 2019, Labour, Liberal Democrats, Ashfield Independents and independents formed a coalition.

== Previous council composition ==
After 2019 election		Before 2023 election	
Party	Seats	Party	Seats
Conservative	20	Conservative	19
Labour	14	Labour	14
Liberal Democrats	7	Liberal Democrats	7
Ashfield Ind.	1	Ashfield Ind.	1
Independent	2	Independent	3

=== Changes ===
- Dawn Elliott (Labour) resigns; by-election held May 2021
- March 2021: Ray Darby (Labour) dies; by-election held May 2021
- May 2021: Shaun Dannheimer (Labour) and Sue Paterson (Labour) win by-elections
- January 2022: Margaret Handley leaves Conservatives to sit as an independent
- August 2022: Eddie Cubley (Conservative) dies; by-election held November 2022
- November 2022: Linsey Ellis (Conservative) wins by-election

== Results summary ==
Results of the 2023 Broxtowe Borough Council Election.

Party	Seats						Aggregate Votes		
Party	Candidates	Total	Gains	Losses	Net +/-	Of all (%)	Total	Of all (%)	Difference
Labour	42	26	12	0	▲12	59.1	31,430	43.9	▲9.3
Conservative	34	10	0	10	▼10	22.7	20,092	28.1	▼7.6
Liberal Democrats	30	5	0	2	▼2	11.0	13,055	18.2	▼1.6
Independent	11	3	3	2	▲1	7.0	3,348	4.7	▲1.6
Green	12	0	0	0	Steady	0.0	3,531	4.9	▼0.5
ADF	1	0	0	0	Steady	0.0	100	0.1	New
Ashfield Ind.	0	0	0	1	▼1	0.0	N/A	0.0	▼1.3
Total	130	44							

== Ward results ==
An asterisk denotes an incumbent councillor.

=== Attenborough & Chilwell East ===
Attenborough & Chilwell East
Party	Candidate	Votes	%	±%
Labour	Helen Faccio	1,491	53.0	+15.8
Labour	Pauline Smith	1,392	49.5	+16.1
Labour	Richard Falvey	1,340	47.7	+14.6
Conservative	Eric Kerry*	956	34.0	−8.0
Conservative	Trish Roberts-Thomson*	944	33.6	−5.7
Conservative	Thomas Hall	810	28.8	−10.0
Green	Mary Venning	486	17.3	−2.5
Liberal Democrats	Chris Archer	304	10.8	−1.4
Liberal Democrats	John Rule	254	9.0	−2.9
Liberal Democrats	Christopher Salter	175	6.2	−4.2
Turnout		2,812		
Labour gain from Conservative		Swing		
Labour gain from Conservative		Swing		
Labour gain from Conservative		Swing		

=== Awsworth, Cossall & Trowell ===
Awsworth, Cossall & Trowell
Party	Candidate	Votes	%	±%
Conservative	Don Pringle*	818	53.5	+3.7
Conservative	Lydia Ball*	805	52.6	+0.4
Labour	Tyler Marsh	561	36.7	+16.7
Liberal Democrats	Karen Oliver	266	17.4	−6.1
Liberal Democrats	Annie Hughes-Riley	207	13.5	−8.7
Turnout		1,529		
Conservative hold		Swing		
Conservative hold		Swing		

=== Beeston Central ===
Beeston Central
Party	Candidate	Votes	%	±%
Labour	Vanessa Smith	968	51.5	−19.0
Labour	Gabrielle Bunn	912	48.6	−12.3
Green	Tom Stanton	288	15.3	−16.4
Conservative	Justin He	282	15.0	−2.4
Liberal Democrats	Brian Taylor	166	8.8	N/A
Liberal Democrats	Patricia Taylor	141	7.5	N/A
Turnout		1,878		
Labour hold		Swing		
Labour hold		Swing		

=== Beeston North ===
Beeston North
Party	Candidate	Votes	%	±%
Liberal Democrats	Steve Carr*	1,075	67.9	+10.7
Liberal Democrats	Barbara Carr*	918	58.0	+4.1
Labour	Andreas Bieler	689	43.5	+8.6
Green	Gordon Stoner	385	24.3	N/A
Conservative	Robert Bailey	203	12.8	+2.6
Conservative	Nicola Wood	182	11.5	+2.7
Turnout		1,584		
Liberal Democrats hold		Swing		
Liberal Democrats hold		Swing		

=== Beeston Rylands ===
Beeston Rylands
Party	Candidate	Votes	%	±%
Labour	Sarah Webb	912	43.1	−9.4
Labour	Shaun Dannheimer*	879	41.5	−0.9
Conservative	Kenneth Burton	398	18.8	−3.6
Green	Henry Fell	303	14.3	−3.9
Liberal Democrats	Ben Todd	209	9.9	−7.6
Liberal Democrats	Hugh Angseesing	180	8.5	−6.9
Turnout		2,117		
Labour hold		Swing		
Labour hold		Swing		

=== Beeston West ===
Beeston West
Party	Candidate	Votes	%	±%
Labour	Greg Marshall*	1,509	52.1	−4.6
Labour	Ellie Winfield	1,299	44.8	−5.9
Green	Jeni Hunneyball	386	13.3	−5.0
Conservative	Jonathan Portwood	308	10.6	−5.3
Liberal Democrats	Dan Bassford	264	9.1	−9.7
Liberal Democrats	Carmen Flores	258	8.9	−9.4
Turnout		2,897		
Labour hold		Swing		
Labour hold		Swing		

=== Bramcote ===
Bramcote
Party	Candidate	Votes	%	±%
Liberal Democrats	Hannah Land*	1,512	18.11	
Liberal Democrats	Andrew Kingdon	1,454	17.42	
Liberal Democrats	David Watts*	1,446	17.32	
Conservative	Jack Doddy	754	9.03	
Conservative	Sunny Limbachia	698	8.36	
Conservative	John Breheny	690	8.26	
Labour	Val Leyland	629	7.53	
Labour	Claire Lawrence	540	6.47	
Labour	Vanessa Perry	472	5.65	
ADF	Agostino Maurotto	100	1.2	
Independent	William Longdon	54	0.65	
Turnout				
Liberal Democrats hold		Swing		
Liberal Democrats hold		Swing		
Liberal Democrats hold		Swing		

=== Brinsley ===
Brinsley
Party	Candidate	Votes	%	±%
Independent	Elizabeth Williamson*	366	50.48	+8.1
Independent	Brian Enever	273	37.66	N/A
Labour	Gaynor Doherty	86	11.86	−1.1
Turnout				
Independent gain from Ashfield Ind.		Swing		

=== Chilwell West ===
Chilwell West
Party	Candidate	Votes	%	±%
Labour	Helen Skinner*	1,156	53.6	+12.7
Labour	Stephen Jeremiah	1,044	48.4	+17.4
Labour	Colin Tideswell*	886	41.1	+4.5
Conservative	Caroline Kerry	727	33.7	−6.0
Conservative	Andrew Askham	711	32.9	−2.2
Green	Richard Eddleston	527	24.4	+1.4
Liberal Democrats	Gavin Slater	287	13.3	−4.6
Liberal Democrats	Duncan Fyfe	187	8.7	−2.9
Liberal Democrats	Reece Oliver	154	7.1	−2.1
Turnout		2,158		
Labour hold		Swing		
Labour hold		Swing		
Labour hold		Swing		

=== Eastwood Hall ===
Eastwood Hall
Party	Candidate	Votes	%	±%
Labour	Bob Bullock	300	47.54	+20.2
Independent	Guy Hagan	173	27.42	N/A
Conservative	Joshua Parker*	158	25.04	−16.6
Turnout				
Labour gain from Conservative		Swing		

=== Eastwood Hilltop ===
Eastwood Hilltop
Party	Candidate	Votes	%	±%
Labour	Milan Radulovic*	645	62.6	+15.3
Labour	Susan Bagshaw*	586	56.8	+10.8
Conservative	Lisa Hartshorn	229	22.2	+0.4
Conservative	Alex Marker	204	19.8	−1.5
Independent	Levi Ensor	179	17.4	N/A
Turnout		1,031		
Labour hold		Swing		
Labour hold		Swing		

=== Eastwood St Mary's ===
Eastwood St Mary's
Party	Candidate	Votes	%	±%
Labour	David Bagshaw*	491	43.9	+9.8
Labour	Ken Woodhead	489	43.7	+12.2
Independent	Kane Oliver	395	35.3	N/A
Independent	Julie Newing	353	31.5	N/A
Conservative	Joe Wiltshire	196	17.5	−6.5
Green	Rosemary Woods	119	10.6	+1.4
Turnout		1,119		
Labour hold		Swing		
Labour hold		Swing		

=== Greasley ===
Greasley
Party	Candidate	Votes	%	±%
Conservative	Mick Brown*	900	51.6	−9.6
Conservative	Hannah Crosby	706	40.5	−17.9
Conservative	Adam Stockwell	701	40.2	−14.9
Labour	Neil Levett	590	33.8	−0.9
Labour	Danny Hall	525	30.1	−3.6
Labour	Anne Ryan	478	27.4	−0.6
Liberal Democrats	Carl Lewis	277	15.9	N/A
Liberal Democrats	Jo Cooke	242	13.9	N/A
Green	Pat Morton	220	12.6	N/A
Liberal Democrats	Arthur Trussell	114	6.5	N/A
Turnout		1,743		
Conservative hold		Swing		
Conservative hold		Swing		
Conservative hold		Swing		

=== Kimberley ===
Kimberley
Party	Candidate	Votes	%	±%
Labour	Andy Cooper	936	55.6	+28.1
Labour	Chris Carr	902	53.6	+27.0
Labour	Will Mee	846	50.3	+26.4
Conservative	Shane Easom*	778	46.2	+7.1
Conservative	Hefin Peter Lawlor	652	38.7	+0.3
Turnout		1,683		
Labour gain from Conservative		Swing		
Labour gain from Conservative		Swing		
Labour gain from Independent		Swing		

=== Nuthall East & Strelley ===
Nuthall East & Strelley
Party	Candidate	Votes	%	±%
Conservative	Philip Owen*	736	47.5	−1.7
Conservative	Graham Hills	692	44.7	+0.1
Labour	Sheikh Assab	609	39.3	+5.8
Labour	Dave Tantum	589	38.0	+3.9
Green	Rachel Gravett	190	12.3	−3.9
Liberal Democrats	Rebecca Morris-Buck	97	6.3	N/A
Turnout		1,549		
Conservative hold		Swing		
Conservative hold		Swing		

=== Stapleford North ===
Stapleford North
Party	Candidate	Votes	%	±%
Independent	Richard MacRae*	673	53.8	−19.1
Independent	Donna MacRae	483	38.6	N/A
Conservative	John Doddy	440	35.2	+7.5
Labour	Pete Beckett	360	28.8	+1.7
Labour	Dan Moss	296	23.7	N/A
Turnout		1,251		
Independent hold		Swing		
Independent gain from Conservative		Swing		

=== Stapleford South East ===
Stapleford South East
Party	Candidate	Votes	%	±%
Labour	Ross Bofinger	449	30.5	+4.8
Labour	Katherine Harlow	382	26.0	+2.8
Liberal Democrats	Tim Hallam*	370	25.2	−19.5
Liberal Democrats	Bob Browne	341	23.2	−19.8
Conservative	Bradley Bell	329	22.4	−8.0
Conservative	Kash Purewal	299	20.3	−6.2
Independent	Lorraine Longford	227	15.4	N/A
Independent	Susan Kelly	172	11.7	N/A
Green	Teresa Needham	172	11.7	N/A
Green	Si Frost	122	8.3	N/A
Turnout		1,470		
Labour gain from Liberal Democrats		Swing		
Labour gain from Liberal Democrats		Swing		

=== Stapleford South West ===
Stapleford South West
Party	Candidate	Votes	%	±%
Labour	Maggie McGrath	822	78.6	+27.9
Labour	Sue Paterson*	738	70.5	+26.8
Liberal Democrats	Todd Oliver	202	19.3	−3.8
Liberal Democrats	John Patrick	179	17.1	−4.9
Turnout		1,046		
Labour hold		Swing		
Labour hold		Swing		

=== Toton & Chilwell Meadows ===
Toton & Chilwell Meadows
Party	Candidate	Votes	%	±%
Labour	Teresa Cullen	912	37.5	+13.5
Conservative	Stephanie Kerry*	862	35.5	−16.9
Conservative	Halimah Khaled*	834	34.3	−15.1
Conservative	Richard Jackson	833	34.3	−17.4
Labour	Peter Falvey	753	31.0	+7.2
Labour	Charlie Harris	750	30.9	+8.2
Liberal Democrats	Simon Roche	682	28.1	+2.6
Liberal Democrats	Michael Rich	569	23.4	+3.3
Liberal Democrats	Ian Tyler	525	21.6	+3.2
Green	Lily Oldham	333	13.7	N/A
Turnout		2,429		
Labour gain from Conservative		Swing		
Conservative hold		Swing		
Conservative hold		Swing		

=== Watnall & Nuthall West ===
Watnall & Nuthall West
Party	Candidate	Votes	%	±%
Conservative	Jill Owen*	652	50.7	−10.0
Labour	Peter Bales	618	48.1	+25.2
Conservative	Bob Willimott*	605	47.1	−9.9
Labour	Graham Lambert	599	46.6	+24.6
Turnout		1,285		
Conservative hold		Swing		
Labour gain from Conservative		Swing		

== Post-election changes ==
=== Affiliation changes ===
- In August 2023 it was reported that Steve Carr and Barbara Carr left the Liberal Democrats to sit as independents.
- On 2 January 2025, 20 of the 26 councillors elected as Labour Party candidates, including council leader Milan Radulovic, resigned from the party due to dissatisfaction with the national Labour Party. They formed the Broxtowe Independents party, and will attempt to run the council as a minority grouping.

=== By-elections ===
==== Attenborough & Chilwell East ====
Attenborough and Chilwell East by-election, 2 May 2024
Party	Candidate	Votes	%	±%
Labour	Tyler Jai Marsh	1,320	46.0	−1.7
Conservative	Eric Kerry	978	34.1	+0.1
Green	Mary Evelyn Venning	369	12.9	−4.4
Liberal Democrats	Simon Peter Roche	201	7.0	−3.8
Turnout			51	
Labour hold				

The Attenborough and Chilwell East by-election was triggered by the resignation of Labour councillor Richard Falvey.

==== Nuthall East & Strelley ====
Nuthall East & Strelley by-election: 28 August 2025
Party	Candidate	Votes	%	±%
Conservative	Judy Couch	405	28.6	–16.5
Reform	Neil Isted	400	28.3	N/A
Broxtowe Alliance	Graham Lambert	275	19.4	N/A
Labour	Domenica Lopinto	244	17.2	–20.1
Green	Rachel Gravett	70	4.9	–6.7
Independent	Tyrone Gall	21	1.5	N/A
Majority		5	0.3	N/A
Turnout		1,416	35.2	
Registered electors		4,020		
Conservative hold				

==== Stapleford South East ====
Stapleford South East by-election: 4 December 2025
Party	Candidate	Votes	%	±%
Broxtowe Alliance	Sarah Camplin	388	34.5	New
Reform	Sunny Limbachia	245	21.8	New
Liberal Democrats	Simon Roche	149	13.3	−11.9
Labour	Keith Bacon	128	11.4	−19.1
Conservative	Bradley Bell	108	9.6	−12.8
Independent	Lorraine Gerry	103	9.2	−6.2
Majority		143	12.7	
Turnout		1,124	28.2	
Registered electors		3,986		
Broxtowe Alliance gain from Labour		Swing		
