= 2011 Broxtowe Borough Council election =

Map of results of 2011 election

Elections to Broxtowe Borough Council were held on 5 May 2011 to elect all 44 members to the council.

The Conservative Party held overall control of the council from its foundation in 1973 until 1995 when the Labour Party took control. The 2003 election saw Labour lose overall control of the council. Since 2003 the council has been under no overall control with Labour and the Liberal Democrats sharing power.

The previous whole-council election was held in 2007 and the results were: Conservative 16, Liberal Democrats 15, Labour 10 (including the results of a delayed election), Independent 2, British National Party 1. The Conservatives have the largest representation on the council and in a by-election in 2009 gained the one seat the BNP won in 2007.

No boundary changes (to the borough's wards) took place between the 2007 and 2011 elections.

== Overall election result ==
A total of 44 councillors were elected from 21 wards. The council remained no overall control, with the Conservatives remaining the largest party. The Labour Party took seats from the Liberal Democrats and became the second largest party on the council.

Broxtowe local election result 2011
Party	Seats	Gains	Losses	Net gain/loss	Seats %	Votes %	Votes	+/−
Conservative	18			+2			31,886	
Labour	17			+7			33,906	
Liberal Democrats	9			-6			17,616	
Independent	0			-2			160	
UKIP	0			0			623	
BNP	0			-1			0	
Green	0			0			1,177	

Gains/losses compared to the 2007 results.

== Broxtowe Borough Council – results by ward ==
=== Attenborough ===
Attenborough (1 seat)
Party	Candidate	Votes	%
Conservative	Eric Kerry (E)	616	55.6
Labour	Thomas Paul Anderton	414	37.4
Liberal Democrats	Stephen Jonathen Rule	78	7.0
Turnout		1124	60

=== Awsworth ===
Awsworth (1 seat)
Party	Candidate	Votes	%
Conservative	Lydia Antoinette Ball (E)	445	53.6
Labour	Sarah Brown	386	46.4
Turnout		841	49

=== Beeston Central ===
Beeston Central (2 seats)
Party	Candidate	Votes	%
Labour	Lynda Lally (E)	943	31.5
Labour	Pat Lally (E)	898	30.0
Conservative	Mick Atherton	390	13.0
Conservative	Eileen Thompson	362	12.1
Green	Mary Evelyn Venning	146	4.9
Liberal Democrats	Paul Fox	128	4.3
Liberal Democrats	Stella Fox	124	4.2
Turnout		3000	48

=== Beeston North ===
Beeston North (2 seats)
Party	Candidate	Votes	%
Liberal Democrats	Steve Carr (E)	1,027	25.4
Labour	Andrea Jane Oates (E)	766	19.0
Liberal Democrats	Chris Salter	717	17.7
Labour	David Thomas Patrick	701	17.4
Conservative	Phillip John Carter Hopkinson	352	8.7
Conservative	Jeremy Treece	256	6.3
Green	Sylvia Anne Rule	222	5.5
Turnout		4052	50

=== Beeston Rylands ===
Beeston Rylands (2 seats)
Party	Candidate	Votes	%
Labour	Steve Barber (E)	1,236	32.8
Labour	Frank Prince (E)	1,089	28.9
Conservative	Barry Leonard Walter Chapman	545	14.5
Conservative	Stephanie Dawn Kerry	540	14.3
Liberal Democrats	John Murdoch Patrick	186	4.9
Liberal Democrats	Patricia Ann Taylor	176	4.7
Turnout		3801	49

=== Beeston West ===
Beeston West (2 seats)
Party	Candidate	Votes	%
Labour	Janet Patrick (E)	1,080	24.3
Labour	Greg Marshall (E)	1,064	23.9
Liberal Democrats	Graham Morley Hopcroft	563	12.7
Liberal Democrats	Brian Taylor	522	11.7
Conservative	Bill Shaw	478	10.8
Conservative	Richard Frank Skinner	428	9.6
Green	Paul Anderson	183	4.1
Green	Gordon Brian Stoner	128	2.9
Turnout		4467	57

=== Bramcote ===
Bramcote (3 seats)
Party	Candidate	Votes	%
Liberal Democrats	Stan Heptinstall (E)	1,818	18.3
Liberal Democrats	David Kenneth Watts (E)	1,389	14.0
Liberal Democrats	Ian Lloyd Tyler (E)	1,335	13.4
Conservative	John Anthony Doddy	1,120	11.3
Conservative	Phillip Edward Paul Archer Brooks-Stephenson	1,060	10.7
Conservative	Trevor Lewis Jones	995	10.0
Labour	Geoff Ward	693	7.0
Labour	Brian Pollard	617	6.2
Labour	Colin John Muge	590	5.9
UKIP	Chris Cobb	318	3.2
Turnout		9948	59

=== Brinsley ===
Brinsley (1 seat)
Party	Candidate	Votes	%
Conservative	John Leslie Booth (E)	468	56.4
Labour	Don Rowley	246	29.6
Green	Beth Hewis	83	10.0
Liberal Democrats	Martin Shaw	33	4.0
Turnout		838	44

=== Chilwell East ===
Chilwell East (2 seats)
Party	Candidate	Votes	%
Conservative	Joan Sylvia Briggs (E)	974	25.1
Conservative	Richard Ian Jackson (E)	880	22.6
Labour	Claire Lawrence	858	22.1
Labour	Jane Elizabeth Marshall	847	21.8
Liberal Democrats	Jane Carwen Lachhar	176	4.5
Liberal Democrats	Amanda Jane Hull	154	4.0
Turnout		3923	52

=== Chilwell West ===
Chilwell West (3 seats)
Party	Candidate	Votes	%
Conservative	Eileen Hepworth Atherton (E)	1,168	16.6
Conservative	Graham Harvey (E)	1,075	15.2
Conservative	Tim Brindley (E)	1,047	14.8
Labour	Alan Phillip Darley	981	13.9
Labour	Maureen Morgan	901	12.8
Labour	Kamal Choudhury	887	12.6
Liberal Democrats	Barbara Carr	305	4.3
Green	Richard David Eddleston	296	4.2
Liberal Democrats	Helen Grindell	214	3.0
Liberal Democrats	Brenda Houldsworth	184	2.6
Turnout		7069	45

=== Cossall & Kimberley ===
Cossall & Kimberley (3 seats)
Party	Candidate	Votes	%
Labour	Richard Stephen Robinson (E)	1,284	18.7
Labour	Mary McGuckin (E)	1,131	16.4
Labour	Andy Cooper (E)	1,093	15.9
Conservative	Shane Easom	997	14.5
Conservative	Mel Crow	942	13.7
Conservative	Edward Cubley	729	10.6
Liberal Democrats	Elaine Cockburn	390	5.7
Liberal Democrats	Godfrey Richard Walt	166	2.4
Liberal Democrats	Stephanie Mary Walt	149	2.2
Turnout		6897	49

=== Eastwood North & Greasley (Beauvale) ===
Eastwood North & Greasley (Beauvale) (2 seats)
Party	Candidate	Votes	%
Labour	David Bagshaw (E)	408	20.4
Liberal Democrats	Bob Charlesworth (E)	358	17.9
Labour	Ken Woodhead	345	17.3
Liberal Democrats	Hazel Lesley Charlesworth	337	16.9
Conservative	John William Handley	292	14.6
Conservative	Adrian Royce Limb	257	12.9
Turnout		2013	45

The results were initially declared with the totals of Bob Charlesworth and Hazel Charlesworth swapped. The result was corrected by election petition.

=== Eastwood South ===
Eastwood South (3 seats)
Party	Candidate	Votes	%
Labour	Milan Radulovic (E)	1,008	17.4
Labour	Susan Ann Bagshaw (E)	984	17.0
Labour	Charlie Robb (E)	878	15.1
Liberal Democrats	Keith Longdon	577	9.9
Liberal Democrats	Jossie Forrest	537	9.3
Liberal Democrats	David Hallam	522	9.0
Conservative	Christine Mary Bird	476	8.2
Conservative	June Layton	462	8.0
Conservative	Deborah Viitanen	361	6.2
Turnout		5832	40

=== Greasley (Giltbrook & Newthorpe) ===
Greasley (Giltbrook & Newthorpe) (3 seats)
Party	Candidate	Votes	%
Conservative	Mick Brown (E)	1,331	19.1
Conservative	Margaret Handley (E)	1,196	17.2
Conservative	Stuart Rowland (E)	1,120	16.1
Labour	Colin Neil Sansom	945	13.6
Labour	Laura Franchi	896	12.9
Labour	David Charles Kirwan	874	12.6
Liberal Democrats	Kevin Francis Wilkinson	205	3.0
Liberal Democrats	Lee-Ann Foreman	202	2.9
Liberal Democrats	Nigel Stephen Morgan	187	2.7
Turnout		6976	51

=== Nuthall East & Strelley ===
Nuthall East & Strelley (2 seats)
Party	Candidate	Votes	%
Conservative	Paul David Simpson (E)	977	28.8
Conservative	Nita Green (E)	954	28.1
Labour	Clare Colmore	763	22.5
Labour	Janet Pearce	699	20.6
Turnout		3412	47

=== Nuthall West & Greasley (Watnall) ===
Nuthall West & Greasley (Watnall) (2 seats)
Party	Candidate	Votes	%
Conservative	Jill Owen (E)	1,084	31.7
Conservative	Derek A Burnett (E)	1,020	29.8
Labour	Christine Brown	673	19.7
Labour	Laura Elizabeth Brown	648	18.9
Turnout		3449	47

=== Stapleford North ===
Stapleford North (2 seats)
Party	Candidate	Votes	%
Liberal Democrats	Brian Wombwell (E)	500	22.5
Labour	Iris White (E)	442	19.9
Liberal Democrats	Mark Andrew Elvin	387	17.4
Labour	Russell Whiting	377	17.0
Conservative	Phillip John Batty	193	8.7
Conservative	Margaret Deryn Braham	164	7.4
Independent	John Longdon	160	7.2
Turnout		2231	45

=== Stapleford South East ===
Stapleford South East (2 seats)
Party	Candidate	Votes	%
Liberal Democrats	Jacky Williams (E)	770	21.9
Liberal Democrats	David Grindell (E)	711	20.2
Labour	Glenn Baker	577	16.4
Conservative	Shaun Reynolds	527	15.0
Labour	Gill Yamin	497	14.1
Conservative	Pip Din	434	12.3
Turnout		3531	50

=== Stapleford South West ===
Stapleford South West (2 seats)
Party	Candidate	Votes	%
Labour	John William McGrath (E)	797	29.1
Labour	Ray Darby (E)	702	25.6
Liberal Democrats	Dave Pearson	365	13.2
Liberal Democrats	Kevin Thomas	303	11.0
Conservative	Christopher Harry Rice	241	8.8
Conservative	Andrew Britton	211	7.7
Green	Sarah Louise Camplin	119	4.3
Turnout		2748	45

=== Toton & Chilwell Meadows ===
Toton & Chilwell Meadows (3 seats)
Party	Candidate	Votes	%
Conservative	Marilyn Yvonne Hegyi (E)	1,529	18.1
Conservative	Craig Cox (E)	1,491	17.7
Conservative	Tony Ford (E)	1,413	16.7
Labour	David Smith	926	11.0
Labour	Joe Patrick	925	11.0
Labour	Dominic James Wring	837	9.9
Liberal Democrats	Bob Pembleton	377	4.5
Liberal Democrats	John Mark Rule	334	4.0
UKIP	Keith Willoughby Marriott	305	3.6
Liberal Democrats	Christine Mary Wombwell	304	3.6
Turnout		8470	49

=== Trowell ===
Trowell (1 seat)
Party	Candidate	Votes	%
Liberal Democrats	Ken Rigby (E)	806	70.9
Conservative	Christopher John Doddy	186	16.4
Labour	Chris Richmond	145	12.8
Turnout		1141	57

== By-elections between May 2011 – May 2015 ==
By-elections are called when a representative Councillor resigns or dies, so are unpredictable. A by-election is held to fill a political office that has become vacant between the scheduled elections.

=== Toton and Chilwell Meadows – 15 March 2012 ===
Toton and Chilwell Meadows By-Election 15th March 2012
Party	Candidate	Votes	%	±%
Conservative	Halimah Khaled	831	47.6	−4.9
Labour	Jane Marshall	385	22.1	−9.8
Liberal Democrats	Barbara Carr	300	17.2	+5.1
UKIP	Keith Marriott	228	13.1	+9.5
Majority		446	25.6	
Turnout		1,744	28.1	
Conservative hold		Swing		

=== Toton and Chilwell Meadows – 11 December 2014 ===
Toton and Chilwell Meadows By-Election 11th December 2014
Party	Candidate	Votes	%	±%
Conservative	Mia Riona Kee	952	54.5	+2.6
Labour	David Patrick	454	26.0	−5.9
UKIP	Darryl Mark Paxford	340	19.5	+15.9
Majority				
Turnout				
Conservative hold		Swing		

== See also ==
- 2011 United Kingdom local elections
- 2011 United Kingdom Alternative Vote referendum
- Broxtowe local elections
