= 2021 Nottinghamshire County Council election =

2021 election of all 66 councillors to Nottinghamshire County Council

- 6 May 2021

All 66 seats to Nottinghamshire County Council 34 seats needed for a majority
- Turnout: 38.3% (▲+2.1)
	First party	Second party	Third party
Leader	Kay Cutts	Alan Rhodes (defeated)	Jason Zadrozny
Party	Conservative	Labour	Ashfield Ind.
Last election	31	23	5
Seats won	37	15	10
Seat change	▲6	▼8	▲5
Popular vote	100,941	69,789	19,288
Percentage	42.4%	29.3%	8.1%
Swing	▲3.0%	▼3.4%	▲3.4%
- Map showing the results of the 2021 Nottinghamshire County Council election
Council control before election
Conservative &
Mansfield Independent Forum
Council control after election
Conservative

The 2021 Nottinghamshire County Council election took place on 6 May 2021 as part of the 2021 local elections in the United Kingdom. All 66 councillors were elected from 56 electoral divisions, which returned either one or two county councillors each by first-past-the-post voting for a four-year term of office.

The Conservative Party won 37 of 66 seats, winning an overall majority for the first time since 2009. The then Member of Parliament for Mansfield, Ben Bradley, was elected in Mansfield North division and was subsequently appointed Leader of the Council. He faced criticism from local Labour MPs and opposition councillors for taking the position whilst also serving as an MP. Bradley ceased to be an MP after losing his seat in the 2024 general election. Councillor Bruce Laughton, of Muskham and Farnsfield division, was appointed Deputy Leader of the Council.

The Labour Party won 15 seats, a net loss of 8 seats compared with the previous election. Councillor Alan Rhodes, Leader of the Labour group, lost his seat to the Conservatives in the Worksop North division to Callum Bailey. The Ashfield Independents won every seat in the Ashfield district, and the Liberal Democrats retained their single seat in the Bramcote & Beeston North division.

== Background ==
In the 2017 election, no single party won a majority of seats on the council. The Conservative Party won 31 seats, 3 short of an overall majority. The Conservatives subsequently formed a coalition with the Mansfield Independent Forum and the Conservative leader Kay Cutts was appointed Leader of the Council. Prior to the 2021 election, Cutts announced her retirement from politics and did not seek re-election.

== Overall election results ==
Political composition of the council following the election

Overall Turnout
Registered electors	622,403
Votes cast	238,439
Turnout	38.3% (▲2.1%)

2021 Nottinghamshire County Council election
Party	Candidates	Seats	Gains	Losses	Net gain/loss	Seats %	Votes %	Votes	+/−
Conservative	66	37	11	5	▲6	56.1	42.4	100,941	+3.0
Labour	64	15	1	9	▼8	22.7	29.3	69,789	-3.4
Ashfield Ind.	10	10	5	0	▲5	15.2	8.1	19,288	+3.4
Independent	22	3	2	0	▲2	4.5	6.1	14,597	+1.7
Liberal Democrats	45	1	0	0	Steady	1.5	5.8	13,711	-2.1
Green	33	0	0	0	Steady	0.0	5.8	13,767	+3.8
Mansfield Independent	8	0	0	4	▼4	0.0	1.6	3,881	-1.0
Reform	8	0	0	0	Steady	0.0	0.3	743	N/A
TUSC	7	0	0	0	Steady	0.0	0.3	658	+0.1
Socialist Labour	1	0	0	0	Steady	0.0	0.1	161	N/A
Freedom Alliance (UK)	2	0	0	0	Steady	0.0	0.1	115	N/A
Heritage	2	0	0	0	Steady	0.0	0.1	92	N/A
Alliance for Democracy and Freedom (UK)	1	0	0	0	Steady	0.0	0.1	51	N/A
Monster Raving Loony	1	0	0	0	Steady	0.0	0.1	50	N/A
CPA	1	0	0	0	Steady	0.0	0.1	33	N/A

== Results by electoral division ==
=== Ashfield District ===
(10 seats, 10 electoral divisions)

Ashfield District
Party	Candidates						Votes		
Party	Stood	Elected	Gained	Unseated	Net	% of total	%	No.	Net %
Ashfield Ind.	10	10	+5	0	▲+5	100	57.4	19,288	▲+26.0
Conservative	10	0	0	-3	▼-3	0	24.8	8,318	▲+6.2
Labour	10	0	0	-1	▼-1	0	17.4	5,828	▼-11.2
Liberal Democrats	2	0	0	0	0	0	0	149	▼-0.7

Ashfield Turnout
Registered electors	93,911
Votes cast	33,444
Turnout	35.6%

==== Ashfields ====
Ashfields (1 seat)
Party	Candidate	Votes	%	±%
Ashfield Ind.	Jason Bernard Zadrozny (inc)	1,901	63.8	+13.6
Conservative	Cameron Felton	606	20.3	+3.7
Labour	Stefan Lamb	474	15.9	−10.4
Majority		1,295	43.5	N/A
Turnout		2,990	34.1	▼−1.7
Registered electors		8,774		
Ashfield Ind. hold		Swing		

==== Hucknall North ====
Hucknall North (1 seat)
Party	Candidate	Votes	%	±%
Ashfield Ind.	John Morton Anthony Wilmott	1,866	57.0	+48.2
Conservative	Kevin Thomas Rostance	733	22.4	−25.5
Labour	Pat Ayres	596	18.2	−17.3
Liberal Democrats	Martin Alan Howes	78	2.4	−0.4
Majority		1,133	34.6	N/A
Turnout		2,990	34.1	▼−5.0
Registered electors		8,421		
Ashfield Ind. gain from Conservative		Swing		

==== Hucknall South ====
Hucknall South (1 seat)
Party	Candidate	Votes	%	±%
Ashfield Ind.	Lee Waters	1,758	55.2	N/A
Labour	Ria Cash	687	21.6	−16.3
Conservative	Jan Lees	669	21.0	−19.5
Liberal Democrats	James Alan Harvey	71	2.2	−1.2
Majority		1,071	33.6	N/A
Turnout		3,205	34.3	▲+3.5
Registered electors		9,352		
Ashfield Ind. gain from Conservative		Swing		

==== Hucknall West ====
Hucknall West (1 seat)
Party	Candidate	Votes	%	±%
Ashfield Ind.	David Paul Shaw	1,805	52.8	N/A
Conservative	Phil Rostance	1,202	35.1	−16.5
Labour	Stephen John Taylor	415	12.1	−21.1
Majority		603	36.3	N/A
Turnout		3,436	38.2	▲+2.7
Registered electors		8,994		
Ashfield Ind. gain from Conservative		Swing		

==== Kirkby North ====
Kirkby North (1 seat)
Party	Candidate	Votes	%	±%
Ashfield Ind.	Andy Meakin	2,056	71.6	N/A
Labour	Julia Long	454	15.8	−29.5
Conservative	Christine Jennifer Self	360	12.5	−23.1
Turnout		2,883	31.9	▲+2.9
Registered electors		9,046		
Ashfield Ind. gain from Labour		Swing		

==== Kirkby South ====
Kirkby South (1 seat)
Party	Candidate	Votes	%	±%
Ashfield Ind.	Daniel Frederick Williamson	2,074	58.2	−3.6
Labour	Donna Samantha Jane Gilbert	802	22.5	−3.2
Conservative	Carol Anne Flowers	686	19.3	N/A
Turnout		3,582	37.2	▼−2.5
Registered electors		9,637		
Ashfield Ind. hold		Swing		

==== Selston ====
Selston (1 seat)
Party	Candidate	Votes	%	±%
Ashfield Ind.	David Bernard Martin (inc)	1,904	45.1	+4.3
Conservative	Dawn Justice	1,893	44.9	+39.2
Labour	Katherine Alexandra Harlow	421	10.0	−2.5
Turnout		4,234	41.5	▼−2.7
Registered electors		10,203		
Ashfield Ind. gain from Selston Parish Independents		Swing		

==== Sutton Central & East ====
Sutton Central & East (1 seat)
Party	Candidate	Votes	%	±%
Ashfield Ind.	Samantha Kay Deakin (inc)	1,737	59.9	−0.2
Conservative	Shaun Alan Flowers	600	20.7	N/A
Labour	Enid Bakewell	561	19.4	−12.2
Turnout		2,918	30.5	▼−0.5
Registered electors		9,562		
Ashfield Ind. hold		Swing		

==== Sutton North ====
Sutton North (1 seat)
Party	Candidate	Votes	%	±%
Ashfield Ind.	Helen-Ann Smith (inc)	2,233	61.4	−4.8
Conservative	Sam Howlett	835	23.0	N/A
Labour	Linford Martin Gibbons	569	15.6	−10.5
Turnout		3,654	36.3	▲+0.4
Registered electors		10,062		
Ashfield Ind. hold		Swing		

==== Sutton West ====
Sutton West (1 seat)
Party	Candidate	Votes	%	±%
Ashfield Ind.	Tom Hollis (inc)	1,954	55.2	−9.3
Labour	Cathy Mason	849	24.0	+0.2
Conservative	Russell Talbot	734	20.8	+13.3
Turnout		3,552	36.0	▼−3.2
Registered electors		9,860		
Ashfield Ind. hold		Swing		

=== Bassetlaw District ===
(9 seats, 9 electoral divisions)

Bassetlaw District
Party	Candidates						Votes		
Party	Stood	Elected	Gained	Unseated	Net	% of total	%	No.	Net %
Conservative	9	6	3	0	▲+3	66.7	51.6	15,064	▲+15.5
Labour	9	3	0	3	▼-3	33.3	39.6	11,542	▼-4.8
Liberal Democrats	8	0	0	0	0	0	4.8	1,414	▼-1.7
Independent	3	0	0	0	0	0	2.6	750	▼-1.5
Green	1	0	0	0	0	0	1.1	312	NEW
Reform	3	0	0	0	0	0	1.0	296	NEW

Bassetlaw Turnout
Registered electors	88,295
Votes cast	29,584
Turnout	33.5%

==== Blyth & Harworth ====
Blyth & Harworth (1 seat)
Party	Candidate	Votes	%	±%
Labour	Sheila Janice Place (inc)	1,333	47.1	−14.4
Conservative	Ben Storey	1,094	38.7	+20.8
Independent	Drew Smith	349	12.3	N/A
Liberal Democrats	Dan Bassford	53	1.9	−7.1
Turnout		2,847	28.6	▲+2.0
Registered electors		9,943		
Labour hold		Swing		

==== Misterton ====
Misterton (1 seat)
Party	Candidate	Votes	%	±%
Conservative	Tracey Lee Taylor (inc)	2,835	71.0	+16.6
Labour	Jack Peter Bowker	878	22.0	N/A
Liberal Democrats	David Paul Dobbie	278	7.0	−1.0
Turnout		4,039	38.4	▲+3.1
Registered electors		10,527		
Conservative hold		Swing		

==== Retford East ====
Retford East (1 seat)
Party	Candidate	Votes	%	±%
Conservative	Mike Introna	1,624	49.7	+4.9
Labour	Helen Margaret Richards	1,412	43.2	−0.4
Liberal Democrats	Jennifer Anne Coggles	117	3.6	−1.5
Reform	Martin Gennaro Introna	114	3.5	N/A
Turnout		3,281	35.5	▲+2.5
Registered electors		9,254		
Conservative hold		Swing		

==== Retford West ====
Retford West (1 seat)
Party	Candidate	Votes	%	±%
Conservative	Mike Quigley (inc)	1,500	45.0	−1.4
Labour	James Trebor Arthur Napier	1,255	38.0	−6.6
Liberal Democrats	Helen Louise Tamblyn-Saville	456	13.8	+4.9
Reform	Jon Wade	92	2.8	N/A
Turnout		3,322	34.5	▲+2.2
Registered electors		9,625		
Conservative hold		Swing		

==== Tuxford ====
Tuxford (1 seat)
Party	Candidate	Votes	%	±%
Conservative	John William Ogle (inc)	2,335	66.6	−5.3
Labour	Lynne Schuller	667	19.0	+1.6
Green	Lee Martin Sincair	312	8.9	N/A
Liberal Democrats	James Michael Nixon	194	5.5	+0.4
Turnout		3,537	39.3	▲+4.0
Registered electors		9,004		
Conservative hold		Swing		

==== Worksop East ====
Worksop East (1 seat)
Party	Candidate	Votes	%	±%
Labour	Glynn Gilfoyle (inc)	1,394	55.4	−15.7
Conservative	Matthew Stephen Evans	887	35.3	+21.0
Independent	Sonia Kay Armstrong	140	5.6	N/A
Liberal Democrats	Leon Maurice Duveen	93	3.7	−0.3
Turnout		2,531	26.3	▼−0.1
Registered electors		9,636		
Labour hold		Swing		

==== Worksop North ====
Worksop North (1 seat)
Party	Candidate	Votes	%	±%
Conservative	Callum Robert Bailey	1,711	49.8	+21.6
Labour	Alan Rhodes (inc)	1,557	45.3	−15.2
Reform	Paul Giuseppe Scopelliti	90	2.6	N/A
Liberal Democrats	Simon Andrew Russell	80	2.3	−1.0
Turnout		3,458	35.1	▲+1.8
Registered electors		9,843		
Conservative gain from Labour		Swing		

==== Worksop South ====
Worksop South (1 seat)
Party	Candidate	Votes	%	±%
Conservative	Nigel Turner	1,708	50.1	−4.6
Labour	Kevin Maurizio Greaves (inc)	1,438	42.2	+8.8
Independent	Roger James Stocks	261	7.7	N/A
Turnout		3,424	34.9	▲+1.1
Registered electors		9,819		
Conservative gain from Labour		Swing		

==== Worksop West ====
Worksop West (1 seat)
Party	Candidate	Votes	%	±%
Labour	Sybil Jacqueline Fielding (inc)	1,608	51.5	−10.5
Conservative	Lloyd Aaron Widdup †	1,370	43.9	N/A
Liberal Democrats	Philip Ashley Smith	143	4.6	−6.2
Turnout		3,145	29.6	▲+1.6
Registered electors		10,644		
Labour hold		Swing		

† The Conservative candidate for Worksop West, Lloyd Widdup, was suspended by the Conservative Party in April 2021 pending the outcome of an investigation into social media posts. Widdup remained a validly nominated candidate and appeared on the ballot paper.

=== Broxtowe Borough ===
(9 seats, 7 electoral divisions)

Broxtowe Borough
Party	Candidates						Votes		
Party	Stood	Elected	Gained	Unseated	Net	% of total	%	No.	Net %
Conservative	9	5	0	2	▼-2		35.6	13,715	▼-7.6
Labour	9	2	1	0	▲+1		31.0	11,953	▲+1.2
Independent	4	1	1	0	▲+1		12.7	4,872	▲+9.2
Liberal Democrats	9	1	0	0	Steady		12.2	4,714	▼-2.7
Green	7	0	0	0	Steady		8.2	3,171	▲+4.1
Monster Raving Loony	1	0	0	0	Steady		0.1	50	NEW
TUSC	1	0	0	0	Steady		0.1	31	NEW

Broxtowe Turnout
Registered electors	85,558
Votes cast	36,677
Turnout	42.9%

==== Beeston Central & Rylands ====
Beeston Central & Rylands (1 seat)
Party	Candidate	Votes	%	±%
Labour	Kate Foale (inc)	2,178	52.6	+0.3
Conservative	Duncan Stewart McCann	1,169	28.2	−4.1
Green	Mary Evelyn Venning	467	11.3	+5.8
Liberal Democrats	Barbara Caroline Carr	326	7.9	−2.0
Turnout		4,169	43.2	▲+1.4
Registered electors		9,658		
Labour hold		Swing		

==== Bramcote & Beeston North ====
Bramcote & Beeston North (1 seat)
Party	Candidate	Votes	%	±%
Liberal Democrats	Steve Carr (inc)	2,148	42.4	+1.2
Labour	Ellie Winfield	1,276	25.2	+0.5
Conservative	Andrew James Rose-Britton	1,269	25.1	−3.3
Green	Gordon Brian Stoner	320	6.3	N/A
Monster Raving Loony	Mr Badaxe	50	1.0	N/A
Turnout		5,084	50.4	▲+2.2
Registered electors		10,080		
Liberal Democrats hold		Swing		

==== Eastwood ====
Eastwood (1 seat)
Party	Candidate	Votes	%	±%
Conservative	Eddie Cubley	1,387	46.4	+7.9
Labour	Milan Radulovic	1,251	41.8	+18.3
Liberal Democrats	Josie Marsters	205	6.9	−21.2
Green	Rose Woods	149	5.0	+2.3
Turnout		3,024	32.0	▼−0.8
Registered electors		9,446		
Conservative hold		Swing		

==== Greasley & Brinsley ====
Greasley & Brinsley (1 seat)
Party	Candidate	Votes	%	±%
Independent	Elizabeth Williamson	2,021	48.1	N/A
Conservative	John William Handley (inc)	1,462	34.8	−26.2
Labour	Val Leyland	488	11.6	−10.3
Green	Bethan Hewis	172	4.1	−2.9
Liberal Democrats	Carl Simon Lewis	63	1.5	N/A
Turnout		4,219	44.2	▲+6.7
Registered electors		9,552		
Independent gain from Conservative		Swing		

==== Nuthall & Kimberley ====
Nuthall & Kimberley (1 seat)
Party	Candidate	Votes	%	±%
Conservative	Philip John Owen (inc)	1,949	46.3	−9.7
Labour	Sheikh Abdul Assab	1,047	24.9	−1.6
Independent	Richard Robinson	873	20.8	N/A
Liberal Democrats	Reece Joe Oliver	156	3.7	N/A
Green	Perry Hill-Wood	149	3.5	−6.9
TUSC	Clare Wilkins	31	0.7	N/A
Turnout		4,229	40.8	▲+3.4
Registered electors		10,378		
Conservative hold		Swing		

==== Stapleford & Broxtowe Central ====
Stapleford & Broxtowe Central (2 seats)
Party	Candidate	Votes	%	±%
Conservative	John Anthony Doddy (inc)	2,651	37.1	−2.2
Labour	Maggie McGrath	2,146	30.0	+0.3
Independent	Richard Danny MacRae	1,978	27.7	+5.4
Conservative	Kash Purewal	1,744	24.4	−7.4
Labour	Sue Paterson	1,641	23.0	−4.8
Liberal Democrats	Tim Hallam	1,055	14.8	−1.3
Liberal Democrats	Hannah May Land	882	12.3	−4.4
Green	Teresa Yvonne Needham	648	9.1	N/A
Independent	William John Longdon	415	5.8	−26.0
Turnout		7,185	41.4	▲+1.6
Registered electors		17,337		
Conservative hold		Swing		
Labour gain from Conservative		Swing		

==== Toton, Chilwell & Attenborough ====
Toton, Chilwell & Attenborough (2 seats)
Party	Candidate	Votes	%	±%
Conservative	Richard Ian Jackson (inc)	3,828	43.8	−4.6
Conservative	Eric Kerry (inc)	3,827	43.8	−4.7
Labour	Teresa Ann Cullen	3,567	40.9	+10.6
Labour	Tyler Jai Marsh	2,756	31.6	+4.2
Green	Richard David Eddleston	1,266	14.5	+7.4
Liberal Democrats	Graham Roy Heal	761	8.7	−3.0
Liberal Democrats	Michael Granville Rich	647	7.4	−1.6
Turnout		8,767	45.9	▲+4.8
Registered electors		19,107		
Conservative hold		Swing		
Conservative hold		Swing		

=== Gedling Borough ===
(9 seats, 6 electoral divisions)

Gedling Borough
Party	Candidates						Votes		
Party	Stood	Elected	Gained	Unseated	Net	% of total	%	No.	Net %
Labour	9	6	0	1	▼-1		41.9	14,427	▼-2.0
Conservative	9	3	1	0	▲+1		43.0	14,801	▲+0.6
Green	6	0	0	0	Steady		7.2	2,471	▲+4.9
Liberal Democrats	9	0	0	0	Steady		5.4	1,870	▼-0.7
Independent	3	0	0	0	Steady		2.4	825	▲+2.2

Gedling Turnout
Registered electors	90,178
Votes cast	34,182
Turnout	37.9%

==== Arnold North ====
Arnold North (2 seats)
Party	Candidate	Votes	%	±%
Labour	Michael Richard Payne (inc)	3,994	51.3	+6.8
Labour	Pauline Annette Allan (inc)	3,985	51.2	+5.7
Conservative	Stuart James Bestwick	3,096	39.8	−2.9
Conservative	Kevin Backhouse Doyle	2,878	37.0	−5.5
Green	Jim Norris	401	5.2	+3.3
Independent	Paul Richard Key	224	2.9	N/A
Liberal Democrats	Jason Martin Stansfield	198	2.5	−0.5
Liberal Democrats	Tadeusz Jones	183	2.4	−0.7
Independent	Don Stickland	122	1.6	N/A
Turnout		7,817	38.3	▲+1.1
Registered electors		20,420		
Labour hold		Swing		
Labour hold		Swing		

==== Arnold South ====
Arnold South (2 seats)
Party	Candidate	Votes	%	±%
Labour	William John Clarke (inc)	4,371	53.1	+5.7
Labour	Michelle Welsh	4,168	50.6	+3.9
Conservative	Helen Monique Greensmith	2,687	32.6	−6.6
Conservative	Michel Flor-Henry	2,583	31.4	−3.2
Green	Jim Stuart	823	10.0	+7.2
Liberal Democrats	Andrew Mark Ellwood	525	6.4	+0.3
Liberal Democrats	Robert Andrew Swift	473	5.7	−1.0
Turnout		8,264	40.2	▼−0.4
Registered electors		20,575		
Labour hold		Swing		
Labour hold		Swing		

==== Calverton ====
Calverton (1 seat)
Party	Candidate	Votes	%	±%
Conservative	Boyd Bryan Elliott (inc)	2,513	61.3	0.0
Independent	Mike Hope	601	14.7	−12.5
Labour	Sabbir Hossain	501	12.2	−15.0
Green	Nicholas Richard Blinston	287	7.0	N/A
Liberal Democrats	Maggie Dunkin	199	4.9	−2.1
Turnout		4,131	39.7	▼−0.9
Registered electors		10,398		
Conservative hold		Swing		

==== Carlton East ====
Carlton East (1 seat)
Party	Candidate	Votes	%	±%
Conservative	Mike Adams	1,816	46.3	+3.0
Labour	Nicki Brooks (inc)	1,793	45.7	+1.6
Green	Paul Manington	181	4.6	N/A
Liberal Democrats	John Edward Flynn	134	3.4	−3.0
Turnout		3,952	39.7	▲+2.3
Registered electors		9,954		
Conservative gain from Labour		Swing		

==== Carlton West ====
Carlton West (2 seats)
Party	Candidate	Votes	%	±%
Labour	Jim Creamer (inc)	3,085	47.4	−0.4
Labour	Errol George Henry (inc)	2,867	44.1	−3.0
Conservative	Ged Clarke	2,357	36.2	+2.8
Conservative	Charlie Godwin	2,216	34.1	+0.5
Liberal Democrats	Andrew Mark Dunkin	631	9.7	0.0
Liberal Democrats	Paul Anthony Hughes	597	9.2	+1.0
Green	Rosey Palmer	529	8.1	+3.2
Turnout		6,548	32.3	▼−1.5
Registered electors		20,291		
Labour hold		Swing		
Labour hold		Swing		

==== Newstead ====
Newstead (1 seat)
Party	Candidate	Votes	%	±%
Conservative	Chris Barnfather (inc)	2,332	67.6	−1.0
Labour	Matthew Peter Spurr	683	19.8	+0.7
Green	Margret Susan Barbara Vince	250	7.3	+3.9
Liberal Democrats	John Antony Sutherland	183	5.3	+1.7
Turnout		3,470	40.6	▼−1.4
Registered electors		8,540		
Conservative hold		Swing		

=== Mansfield District ===
(9 seats, 5 electoral divisions)

Mansfield District
Party	Candidates						Votes		
Party	Stood	Elected	Gained	Unseated	Net	% of total	%	No.	Net %
Conservative	9	6	6	0	▲+6		40.4	10,750	▲+27.3
Labour	9	2	0	3	▼-3		27.3	7,282	▼-15.3
Independent	7	1	1	0	▲+1		13.0	3,468	▲+11.8
Mansfield Independent	9	0	0	4	▼-4		14.6	3,881	▼-13.0
TUSC	7	0	0	0	Steady		2.4	627	▲+1.3
Green	1	0	0	0	Steady		0.7	180	NEW
Socialist Labour	1	0	0	0	Steady		0.6	161	NEW
Reform	1	0	0	0	Steady		0.4	118	NEW
Liberal Democrats	2	0	0	0	Steady		0.4	115	▼-3.8
Alliance for Democracy and Freedom	1	0	0	0	Steady		0.2	51	NEW

Mansfield Turnout
Registered electors	81,566
Votes cast	29,327
Turnout	36.0%

==== Mansfield East ====
Mansfield East (2 seats)
Party	Candidate	Votes	%	±%
Conservative	Robert Corden	2,933	49.9	NEW
Conservative	Nigel David Moxon	2,110	35.9	NEW
Mansfield Independent	Martin Wright (inc)	1,274	21.7	▼−32.7
Labour	Hayley Dallman	1,241	21.1	▼−15.2
Labour	Mark Steven Fretwell	1,089	18.5	▼−15.8
Mansfield Independent	Vaughan Adrian Hopewell (inc)	973	16.6	▼−32.9
Independent	Benjamin Alexander White	191	3.3	NEW
Socialist Labour	Peter Michael James Dean	161	2.7	NEW
TUSC	Karen Rachel Mary Seymour	80	1.4	▼−0.9
Turnout		5,876	32.3	▲+5.0
Registered electors		18,194		
Conservative gain from Mansfield Independent		Swing		
Conservative gain from Mansfield Independent		Swing		

==== Mansfield North ====
Mansfield North (2 seats)
Party	Candidate	Votes	%	±%
Conservative	Ben Bradley	3,072	35.0	−2.5
Labour	Anne Callaghan	1,944	22.2	−27.6
Conservative	John Russell Knight	1,722	19.6	NEW
Labour	John Edward Coxhead	1,660	18.9	−22.8
Mansfield Independent	Mick Barton	1,071	12.2	NEW
Mansfield Independent	Steve Bodle	663	7.6	NEW
Green	Nina Elizabeth Swanwick	180	2.1	NEW
Reform	Jordan Ashley Hall	118	1.3	NEW
TUSC	Milo Elijah Tooley-Okonkwo	52	0.6	−2.4
Alliance for Democracy and Freedom	Sid Pepper	51	0.6	NEW
TUSC	Tom Hunt	48	0.5	NEW
Turnout		8,776	48.1	▲+19.5
Registered electors		18,247		
Conservative gain from Labour		Swing		
Labour hold		Swing		

==== Mansfield South ====
Mansfield South (2 seats)
Party	Candidate	Votes	%	±%
Independent	Steve Garner (inc)	2,222	33.3	NEW
Conservative	Andre Philip Camilleri	2,024	30.3	+9.4
Conservative	Robert Philip Elliman	1,884	28.2	NEW
Labour	Andy Abrahams	1,597	23.9	+0.5
Independent	Andy Sissons (inc)	1,353	20.3	NEW
Labour	Maxi Leigh	971	14.6	−8.6
Mansfield Independent	Bill Drewett	448	6.7	−49.5
Mansfield Independent	Kevin John Brown	378	5.7	−40.6
Independent	Sadie Kime	209	3.1	NEW
Liberal Democrats	Thorsten Altenkirch	115	1.7	−2.6
Liberal Democrats	Andy Rimmer	101	1.5	−1.5
TUSC	Paul Tooley-Okonkwo	61	0.9	NEW
Turnout		6,672	35.8	▲+5.5
Registered electors		18,638		
Independent gain from Mansfield Independent		Swing		
Conservative gain from Mansfield Independent		Swing		

==== Mansfield West ====
Mansfield West (2 seats)
Party	Candidate	Votes	%	±%
Conservative	Sinead Anne Anderson	1,614	30.9	−0.3
Labour	Paul Nigel Henshaw (inc)	1,454	27.8	−17.1
Labour	Diana Mary Meale (inc)	1,301	24.9	−19.7
Conservative	Paul Stephen Marshall	1,149	22.0	NEW
Mansfield Independent	Barry Michael Answer	1,088	20.8	NEW
Independent	Michael Higginson	982	18.8	NEW
Independent	Kier Barsby	935	17.9	NEW
Mansfield Independent	David Malcolm Smith	679	13.0	NEW
TUSC	Deborah Jane Hannah Hodson	91	1.7	−1.6
TUSC	Denise Nneka Tooley-Okonkwo,	63	1.2	NEW
Turnout		5,230	30.5	▲+3.4
Registered electors		17,148		
Conservative gain from Labour		Swing		
Labour hold		Swing		

==== Warsop ====
Warsop (1 seat)
Party	Candidate	Votes	%	±%
Conservative	Bethan Sian Eddy	1,107	40.1	+18.2
Labour	Andy Wetton (inc)	1,046	37.9	−26.6
TUSC	Ken Bonsall	343	12.4	N/A
Independent	Philip Shields	264	9.6	N/A
Turnout		2,773	29.7	▲+2.6
Registered electors		9,339		
Conservative gain from Labour		Swing		

=== Newark & Sherwood District ===
(10 seats, 10 electoral divisions)

Newark & Sherwood District
Party	Candidates						Votes		
Party	Stood	Elected	Gained	Unseated	Net	% of total	%	No.	Net %
Conservative	10	8	2	0	▲+2		52.9	18,077	▼-2.3
Labour	9	1	0	2	▼-2		22.1	7,546	▼-3.8
Independent	4	1	0	0	Steady		9.3	3,163	▼-0.2
Green	9	0	0	0	Steady		8.0	2,743	▲+7.3
Liberal Democrats	6	0	0	0	Steady		6.9	2,346	▼-1.9
Reform	2	0	0	0	Steady		0.4	119	NEW
Freedom Alliance	2	0	0	0	Steady		0.3	115	NEW
Heritage	2	0	0	0	Steady		0.3	92	NEW

Newark & Sherwood Turnout
Registered electors	92,402
Votes cast	34,407
Turnout	37.2%

==== Balderton ====
Balderton (1 seat)
Party	Candidate	Votes	%	±%
Conservative	Johno Lee	1,660	65.8	−4.4
Labour	Dora Polenta	398	15.8	−5.5
Liberal Democrats	Ryan Thomas Cullen	188	7.5	−1.0
Green	Stephanie Louise Harrison	176	7.0	N/A
Reform	Craig Adam Newman	66	2.6	N/A
Heritage	Lisa Ann Precious	35	1.4	N/A
Turnout		2,537	32.6	▲+4.2
Registered electors		7,793		
Conservative hold		Swing		

==== Blidworth ====
Blidworth (1 seat)
Party	Candidate	Votes	%	±%
Conservative	Tom Smith	1,094	39.0	+1.2
Independent	Tina Thompson	1,040	37.1	N/A
Labour	Yvonne Woodhead (inc)	596	21.3	−20.6
Green	Caroline Margaret Anne Kew	72	2.6	N/A
Turnout		2,809	32.6	▲+3.7
Registered electors		8,626		
Conservative gain from Labour		Swing		

==== Collingham ====
Collingham (1 seat)
Party	Candidate	Votes	%	±%
Independent	Maureen Dobson (inc)	1,854	49.6	−12.5
Conservative	Linda Elaine Dales	1,505	40.2	+2.3
Green	Steve Platt	382	10.2	N/A
Turnout		3,768	37.7	▲+0.9
Registered electors		10,001		
Independent hold		Swing		

==== Farndon & Trent ====
Farndon & Trent (1 seat)
Party	Candidate	Votes	%	±%
Conservative	Sue Saddington (inc)	1,937	60.9	−3.4
Labour	Laurence Goff	599	18.8	+6.9
Liberal Democrats	Keith Myers Melton	295	9.3	−0.4
Green	Chris Platt	240	7.5	N/A
Heritage	Sharon Griffin	57	1.8	N/A
Reform	Robert Guy Michael Melton	53	1.7	N/A
Turnout		3,207	41.9	▼−0.6
Registered electors		7,647		
Conservative hold		Swing		

==== Muskham & Farnsfield ====
Muskham & Farnsfield (1 seat)
Party	Candidate	Votes	%	±%
Conservative	Bruce Laughton (inc)	2,999	65.3	−3.7
Labour	Deborah Susan Antcliff	834	18.1	+1.0
Green	Esther Ruth Cropper	412	9.0	+3.5
Liberal Democrats	Phil Barron	351	7.6	−0.8
Turnout		4,625	42.6	▼−0.8
Registered electors		10,862		
Conservative hold		Swing		

==== Newark East ====
Newark East (1 seat)
Party	Candidate	Votes	%	±%
Conservative	Sam Thomas Smith	1,265	45.7	−18.3
Green	Jay Lewis Henderson	1,005	36.3	N/A
Labour	Jennifer Kaye	500	18.1	−9.0
Turnout		2,783	34.3	▲+2.4
Registered electors		8,122		
Conservative hold		Swing		

==== Newark West ====
Newark West (1 seat)
Party	Candidate	Votes	%	±%
Conservative	Keith Frank Girling (inc)	1,235	47.6	−12.6
Labour	Ruth Woodhall	800	30.8	−9.0
Green	Ricky Thomas Mathias	219	8.4	N/A
Independent	Adrian Charles Amer	172	6.6	N/A
Liberal Democrats	Anita Prabhakar	170	6.5	N/A
Turnout		2,621	29.9	▲+2.9
Registered electors		8,774		
Conservative hold		Swing		

==== Ollerton ====
Ollerton (1 seat)
Party	Candidate	Votes	%	±%
Labour	Mike Pringle (inc)	1,588	47.9	−6.7
Conservative	Michael Andrew Brown	1,480	44.6	+2.8
Independent	Jeremy Paul Spry	97	2.9	N/A
Green	Mike Poyzer	93	2.8	N/A
Liberal Democrats	Marylyn Rayner	58	1.7	−1.8
Turnout		3,328	33.1	▼−4.0
Registered electors		10,042		
Labour hold		Swing		

==== Sherwood Forest ====
Sherwood Forest (1 seat)
Party	Candidate	Votes	%	±%
Conservative	Scott Paul Carlton	1,842	54.5	+11.5
Labour	Paul Stephen Peacock	1,348	39.9	−13.6
Green	Steve Morris	144	4.3	N/A
Freedom Alliance	Julie Margaret Tasker	43	1.3	N/A
Turnout		3,397	35.1	▼−1.2
Registered electors		9,675		
Conservative gain from Labour		Swing		

==== Southwell ====
Southwell (1 seat)
Party	Candidate	Votes	%	±%
Conservative	Roger James Jackson (inc)	3,060	57.7	−4.5
Liberal Democrats	Karen Roberts	1,284	24.2	−3.6
Labour	Matthew Joseph Thomson Spoors	883	16.7	+6.7
Freedom Alliance	Helen Elizabeth Clurow	72	1.4	N/A
Turnout		5,332	49.1	▲+0.2
Registered electors		10,860		
Conservative hold		Swing		

=== Rushcliffe Borough ===
(10 seats, 9 electoral divisions)

Rushcliffe Borough
Party	Candidates						Votes		
Party	Stood	Elected	Gained	Unseated	Net	% of total	%	No.	Net %
Conservative	10	9	0	0	Steady		49.3	20,216	
Labour	9	1	0	0	Steady		27.4	11,211	
Green	9	0	0	0	Steady		11.9	4,890	
Liberal Democrats	9	0	0	0	Steady		7.6	3,102	
Independent	1	0	0	0	Steady		3.2	1,328	
Reform	2	0	0	0	Steady		0.5	210	
CPA	1	0	0	0	Steady		0.1	33	

Rushcliffe Turnout
Registered electors	90,493
Votes cast	40,818
Turnout	45.1%

==== Bingham East ====
Bingham East (1 seat)
Party	Candidate	Votes	%	±%
Conservative	Francis Anthoney Purdue-Horan (inc)	2,140	49.6	−5.3
Independent	Rowan Bird	1,328	30.8	N/A
Green	Rachel Helen Wilson	701	16.3	+11.7
Reform	John Douglas Swift	110	2.6	N/A
CPA	Zoe Wood	33	0.8	N/A
Turnout		4,342	45.5	▲+0.3
Registered electors		9,545		
Conservative hold		Swing		

==== Bingham West ====
Bingham West (1 seat)
Party	Candidate	Votes	%	±%
Conservative	Jonathan Neil Clarke (inc)	1,581	58.2	+2.9
Labour	Debbie Merryweather	569	20.9	−3.7
Green	Chandler Pax Wilson	254	9.4	N/A
Liberal Democrats	John Coningsby Edwards	212	7.8	N/A
Reform	Ted Birch	100	3.7	N/A
Turnout		2,729	39.2	▲+2.0
Registered electors		6,962		
Conservative hold		Swing		

==== Cotgrave ====
Cotgrave (1 seat)
Party	Candidate	Votes	%	±%
Conservative	Richard Langton Butler (inc)	2,153	63.2	+1.3
Labour	Darren Thomas Stothard	831	24.4	−3.8
Green	David Anthony Nicholson-Cole	231	6.8	−3.1
Liberal Democrats	Giles Alexander Duncan Major	194	5.7	N/A
Turnout		3,421	38.5	▲+0.5
Registered electors		8,880		
Conservative hold		Swing		

==== Keyworth ====
Keyworth (1 seat)
Party	Candidate	Votes	%	±%
Conservative	John Elliott Cottee (inc)	2,752	63.9	+1.9
Labour	Terry Rountree	618	14.3	+2.7
Liberal Democrats	Linda Jane Abbey	559	13.0	−5.7
Green	Neil Pinder	381	8.8	+5.7
Turnout		4,333	49.6	▲+2.9
Registered electors		8,745		
Conservative hold		Swing		

==== Leake & Ruddington ====
Leake & Ruddington (2 seats)
Party	Candidate	Votes	%	±%
Conservative	Matt Barney	3,451	47.2	−8.2
Conservative	Reg Adair (inc)	3,337	45.7	−8.4
Labour	Jen Walker	2,425	33.2	+13.7
Labour	Mike Gaunt	2,291	31.4	+12.0
Liberal Democrats	Jason Richard Billin	1,013	13.9	−2.7
Green	Richard Holmes	819	11.2	+2.4
Liberal Democrats	Shannon Eileen Briggs	424	5.8	−5.1
Turnout		7,338	43.2	▲+3.9
Registered electors		16,992		
Conservative hold		Swing		
Conservative hold		Swing		

==== Radcliffe On Trent ====
Radcliffe On Trent (1 seat)
Party	Candidate	Votes	%	±%
Conservative	Roger Glyn Upton	2,234	54.4	−3.4
Labour	Martin Michael Murphy	1,431	34.8	+4.8
Green	Helga Margret Wills	262	6.4	+1.1
Liberal Democrats	Adam Zbigniew Witko	182	4.4	−2.4
Turnout		4,134	47.7	▲+2.7
Registered electors		8,664		
Conservative hold		Swing		

==== West Bridgford North ====
West Bridgford North (1 seat)
Party	Candidate	Votes	%	±%
Labour	Penny Gowland	2,225	43.3	−7.2
Conservative	Darius Furmonavicius	1,394	27.2	−4.3
Green	George Richard Mallender	1,323	25.8	+16.4
Liberal Democrats	Vicky Price	192	3.7	−4.9
Turnout		5,158	49.0	▲+1.8
Registered electors		10,537		
Labour hold		Swing		

==== West Bridgford South ====
West Bridgford South (1 seat)
Party	Candidate	Votes	%	±%
Conservative	Jonathan Gordon Alexander Wheeler (inc)	2,274	50.1	−0.2
Labour	Bal Bansal	1,260	27.8	+0.1
Green	Ian James Whitehead	581	12.8	+6.5
Liberal Democrats	Syed Shan Hussain	423	9.3	−6.4
Turnout		4,564	45.8	▲+2.5
Registered electors		9,957		
Conservative hold		Swing		

==== West Bridgford West ====
West Bridgford West (1 seat)
Party	Candidate	Votes	%	±%
Conservative	Douglas Gordon Anthony Wheeler (inc)	2,237	47.1	−3.6
Labour	Julie Elizabeth Chaplain	1,852	39.0	+7.6
Green	William Andreas Richardson	338	7.1	+2.5
Liberal Democrats	Jacob Frederick Love	327	6.9	−6.5
Turnout		4,799	47.0	▲+1.1
Registered electors		10,211		
Conservative hold		Swing		

== By-elections ==
=== Collingham ===
Collingham: 17 February 2022
Party	Candidate	Votes	%	±%
Independent	Debbie Darby	2,009	63.8	N/A
Conservative	Jack Kellas	898	28.5	−11.7
Labour	Jennifer Kaye	244	7.7	N/A
Majority		1,111	35.3	
Turnout		3,151	31.4	
Independent hold		Swing	▲37.8	

=== Eastwood ===
Eastwood: 3 November 2022
Party	Candidate	Votes	%	±%
Independent	Kane Oliver	1,223	43.1	N/A
Labour	Milan Radulovic	1,182	41.7	−0.1
Conservative	Mick Brown	431	15.2	−31.2
Turnout		2,841		
Independent gain from Conservative		Swing		

=== Kirkby South ===
Kirkby South: 4 May 2023
Party	Candidate	Votes	%	±%
Ashfield Ind.	Rachel Madden	1,680	51.2	−7.0
Labour	Lorraine Fagan	1,017	31.0	+8.5
Conservative	Samuel Howlett	584	17.8	−1.5
Turnout		3,296	35.1	
Ashfield Ind. hold		Swing		
