= 2015 Broxtowe Borough Council election =

2015 UK local government election

- 2 May 2019

All 44 seats to Broxtowe Borough Council 23 seats needed for a majority

	First party	Second party	Third party
Party	Conservative	Labour	Liberal Democrats
Last election	18 seats	17 seats	9 seats
Seats won	27	12	4
Seat change	▲9	▼5	▼5
	Fourth party
Party	Independent
Last election	0 seats
Seats won	1
Seat change	▲1
- Results by ward
Council control before election
No overall control
Council control after election
Conservative

Elections to Broxtowe Borough Council were held on 7 May 2015 to elect all 44 members to the Councils 20 electoral wards each electing between one and three members who would each serve a four-year term expiring in 2019.

The Conservative Party held overall control of the council from its foundation in 1973 until 1995 when the Labour Party took control. The 2003 election saw Labour lose overall control of the council. Since 2003 the council has been under no overall control with Labour and the Liberal Democrats sharing power.

The previous full council election was in 2011; the result was as follows: Conservatives 18, Labour 16, Liberal Democrats 9. Labour were the controlling party in a coalition with the Liberal Democrats until the 2015 election. The 2015 election saw the Conservative party become the controlling group on the council when they regained control after 20 years in opposition. Following boundary changes (to the borough's ward boundaries) the 2015 election still saw 44 councillors elected but this time to 20 electoral wards.

The 2015 election also saw the youngest councillor ever elected in the councils history when 18 year old Adam Stockwell won a seat in Stapleford South East. Stockwell was also the youngest councillor in the UK at the time.

== Overall election result ==
A total of 44 councillors were elected from 20 wards. The Council became a majority controlled Council for the first time since 2003. The Conservative Party became the controlling party with Labour being reduced to the opposition and the Liberal Democrats remaining the third party with Independent (Richard MacRae) elected also.

Broxtowe local election result 2015
Party	Seats	Gains	Losses	Net gain/loss	Seats %	Votes %	Votes	+/−
Conservative	27	9	0	+9				
Labour	12	0	5	-5				
Liberal Democrats	4	2	6	-4				
Independent	1			+1				
