= 2019 Broxtowe Borough Council election =

2019 UK local government election

- 2 May 2019

All 44 seats to Broxtowe Borough Council 23 seats needed for a majority

	First party	Second party	Third party
Party	Conservative	Labour	Liberal Democrats
Last election	27 seats, 39.2%	12 seats, 34.3%	4 seats, 13.1%
Seats won	20	14	7
Seat change	▼7	▲2	▲3
Popular vote	26,120	25,356	14,533
Percentage	35.7%	34.6%	19.8%
Swing	▼3.5%	▲0.3%	▲6.7%
	Fourth party	Fifth party
Party	Independent	Ashfield Ind.
Last election	1 seat, 3.7%	N/A
Seats won	2	1
Seat change	▲1	▲1
Popular vote	2,264	969
Percentage	3.1%	1.3%
Swing	▼0.6%	N/A
- Winner of each seat at the 2019 Broxtowe Borough Council election
Council control before election
Conservative
Council control after election
No overall control

Elections to Broxtowe Borough Council were held on 2 May 2019.

== Summary ==
=== Election result ===
2019 Broxtowe Borough Council election
Party	Candidates	Seats	Gains	Losses	Net gain/loss	Seats %	Votes %	Votes	+/−
Conservative	41	20	0	8	▼7	45.5	35.7	26,120	–3.5
Labour	43	14	3	1	▲2	31.8	34.6	25,356	+0.3
Liberal Democrats	32	7	5	1	▲3	15.9	19.8	14,533	+6.7
Independent	5	2	1	0	▲1	4.5	3.1	2,264	–0.6
Ashfield Ind.	5	1	1	0	▲1	2.3	1.3	969	N/A
Green	12	0	0	0	Steady	0.0	5.4	3,987	+0.9

== Ward results ==
=== Attenborough & Chilwell East ===
Attenborough & Chilwell East
Party	Candidate	Votes	%	±%
Conservative	Eric Kerry	1,244	42.0	
Conservative	Trish Roberts-Thomson	1,162	39.3	
Conservative	Richard Jackson	1,149	38.8	
Labour	Melesia Burchell	1,102	37.2	
Labour	Shaun Dannheimer	988	33.4	
Labour	Stephen Jeremiah	980	33.1	
Green	Mary Venning	585	19.8	
Green	David Shipman	389	13.1	
Liberal Democrats	Gary Richardson	361	12.2	
Liberal Democrats	Carmen Flores	352	11.9	
Liberal Democrats	Graham Heal	307	10.4	
Majority				
Turnout		2,959		
Conservative hold		Swing		
Conservative hold		Swing		
Conservative hold		Swing		

=== Awsworth, Cossall & Trowell ===
Awsworth, Cossall & Trowell
Party	Candidate	Votes	%	±%
Conservative	Lydia Ball	731	52.2	
Conservative	Don Pringle	697	49.8	
Liberal Democrats	Rachel Roke	329	23.5	
Liberal Democrats	Ian Roke	311	22.2	
Labour	Freya Cumming-Webb	280	20.0	
Labour	Charlie Harris	279	19.9	
Majority				
Turnout		1,400		
Conservative gain from Liberal Democrats		Swing		
Conservative hold		Swing		

=== Beeston Central ===
Beeston Central
Party	Candidate	Votes	%	±%
Labour	Lynda Lally	1,181	70.5	
Labour	Patrick Lally	1,020	60.9	
Green	Gordon Stoner	531	31.7	
Conservative	Graham Harvey	292	17.4	
Majority				
Turnout		1,676		
Labour hold		Swing		
Labour hold		Swing		

=== Beeston North ===
Beeston North
Party	Candidate	Votes	%	±%
Liberal Democrats	Steve Carr	1,109	57.2	
Liberal Democrats	Barbara Carr	1,045	53.9	
Labour	Jennifer Birkett	676	34.9	
Labour	Javed Iqbal	595	30.7	
Conservative	Richard Beaumont	198	10.2	
Conservative	Ken Goold	171	8.8	
Majority				
Turnout		1,938		
Liberal Democrats hold		Swing		
Liberal Democrats hold		Swing		

=== Beeston Rylands ===
Beeston Rylands
Party	Candidate	Votes	%	±%
Labour	Teresa Cullen	746	52.5	
Labour	Dawn Elliott	602	42.4	
Conservative	Joan Briggs	319	22.4	
Conservative	Jack Doddy	261	18.4	
Green	Henry Fell	259	18.2	
Liberal Democrats	Ben Todd	248	17.5	
Liberal Democrats	Dan Bassford	221	15.6	
Majority				
Turnout		1,421		
Labour hold		Swing		
Labour hold		Swing		

=== Beeston West ===
Beeston West
Party	Candidate	Votes	%	±%
Labour	Greg Marshall	1,229	56.7	
Labour	Janet Patrick	1,100	50.7	
Liberal Democrats	Chris Salter	408	18.8	
Green	Darren Wells	397	18.3	
Liberal Democrats	Brian Taylor	396	18.3	
Conservative	Jeremy Cramp	344	15.9	
Conservative	Kenneth Burton	332	15.3	
Majority				
Turnout		2,168		
Labour hold		Swing		
Labour hold		Swing		

=== Bramcote ===
Bramcote
Party	Candidate	Votes	%	±%
Liberal Democrats	Hannah Land	1,405	46.0	
Liberal Democrats	David Watts	1,403	46.0	
Liberal Democrats	Ian Tyler	1,402	45.9	
Conservative	John Doddy	992	32.5	
Conservative	Andrew Britton	976	32.0	
Conservative	Martin Plackett	688	22.5	
Labour	Val Leyland	620	20.3	
Labour	Charis Kettridge	602	19.7	
Labour	Alex Allan	523	17.1	
Majority				
Turnout		3,053		
Liberal Democrats gain from Conservative		Swing		
Liberal Democrats gain from Conservative		Swing		
Liberal Democrats gain from Conservative		Swing		

=== Brinsley ===
Brinsley
Party	Candidate	Votes	%	±%
Ashfield Ind.	Elizabeth Williamson	339	42.4	
Conservative	John Handley	202	25.3	
Labour	David Clarke	104	13.0	
Independent	Jenny Sissons	82	10.3	
Green	Bethan Hewis	72	9.0	
Majority				
Turnout		799		
Ashfield Ind. gain from Conservative		Swing		

=== Chilwell West ===
Chilwell West
Party	Candidate	Votes	%	±%
Labour	Helen Skinner	917	40.9	
Conservative	Eileen Atherton	889	39.7	
Labour	Colin Tideswell	821	36.6	
Conservative	Tim Brindley	788	35.1	
Labour	Ellie Winfield	696	31.0	
Conservative	Kash Purewal	688	30.7	
Green	Richard Eddleston	515	23.0	
Liberal Democrats	Chris Archer	401	17.9	
Liberal Democrats	Tricia Taylor	259	11.6	
Liberal Democrats	Jon Hill	207	9.2	
Majority				
Turnout		2,242		
Labour gain from Conservative		Swing		
Conservative hold		Swing		
Labour gain from Conservative		Swing		

=== Eastwood Hall ===
Eastwood Hall
Party	Candidate	Votes	%	±%
Conservative	Joshua Parker	266	41.6	
Liberal Democrats	Josie Marsters	199	31.1	
Labour	Domenica Lopinto	175	27.3	
Majority				
Turnout		640		
Conservative hold		Swing		

=== Eastwood Hilltop ===
Eastwood Hilltop
Party	Candidate	Votes	%	±%
Labour	Milan Radulovic	501	47.3	
Labour	Susan Bagshaw	487	46.0	
Conservative	Neil Griffin	231	21.8	
Conservative	June Layton	226	21.3	
Ashfield Ind.	Andy Smith	211	19.9	
Ashfield Ind.	Bexley Sears	150	14.2	
Liberal Democrats	Arthur Trussell	106	10.0	
Liberal Democrats	Carl Lewis	93	8.8	
Majority				
Turnout		1,059		
Labour hold		Swing		
Labour hold		Swing		

=== Eastwood St. Mary's ===
Eastwood St. Mary's
Party	Candidate	Votes	%	±%
Labour	David Bagshaw	287	34.1	
Labour	Marie Hannah	265	31.5	
Conservative	Adrian Limb	202	24.0	
Independent	Ken Woodhead	191	22.7	
Conservative	Sylvia Gillespie-Bell	147	17.5	
Ashfield Ind.	Chris Smith	144	17.1	
Ashfield Ind.	Simon Harvey	125	14.9	
Liberal Democrats	Graham Marsters	93	11.1	
Liberal Democrats	Rebecca Morris-Buck	80	9.5	
Green	Rosemary Woods	77	9.2	
Majority				
Turnout		841		
Labour hold		Swing		
Labour gain from Liberal Democrats		Swing		

=== Greasley ===
Greasley
Party	Candidate	Votes	%	±%
Conservative	Mick Brown	1,081	61.2	
Conservative	Margaret Handley	1,031	58.4	
Conservative	Eddie Cubley	972	55.1	
Labour	Colin Sansom	612	34.7	
Labour	Ruby Breward	595	33.7	
Labour	Vanessa Perry	495	28.0	
Majority				
Turnout		1,765		
Conservative hold		Swing		
Conservative hold		Swing		
Conservative hold		Swing		

=== Kimberley ===
Kimberley
Party	Candidate	Votes	%	±%
Independent	Richard Robinson	770	39.7	
Conservative	Shane Eason	759	39.1	
Conservative	Mel Crow	745	38.4	
Conservative	Karen Kirk	615	31.7	
Labour	Bainy Bain	533	27.5	
Labour	Ellis Tansley	516	26.6	
Labour	Jacquie Sainsbury	463	23.9	
Green	Kat Boettge	401	20.7	
Green	Patricia Morton	325	16.7	
Majority				
Turnout		1,941		
Independent gain from Labour		Swing		
Conservative hold		Swing		
Conservative hold		Swing		

=== Nuthall East & Strelley ===
Nuthall East & Strelley
Party	Candidate	Votes	%	±%
Conservative	Philip Owen	727	49.2	
Conservative	Paul Simpson	660	44.6	
Labour	Chris Sainsbury	505	34.1	
Labour	Sheikh Assab	495	33.5	
Green	Rachel Gravett	239	16.2	
Independent	Grenville Urwin-Green	167	11.3	
Majority				
Turnout		1,479		
Conservative hold		Swing		
Conservative hold		Swing		

=== Stapleford North ===
Stapleford North
Party	Candidate	Votes	%	±%
Independent	Richard MacRae	1,054	72.9	
Conservative	Jan Goold	400	27.7	
Labour	Lorna Paterson	392	27.1	
Liberal Democrats	Elizabeth Epton	326	22.6	
Majority				
Turnout		1,445		
Independent hold		Swing		
Conservative hold		Swing		

=== Stapleford South East (delayed) ===
The election in Stapleford South East was delayed until 13 June due to the death of a candidate.

Stapleford South East
Party	Candidate	Votes	%	±%
Liberal Democrats	Tim Hallam	559	44.7	
Liberal Democrats	David Grindell	538	43.0	
Conservative	John Doddy	380	30.4	
Conservative	Adam Stockwell	331	26.5	
Labour	Sue Paterson	322	25.7	
Labour	Eleanor Allan	290	23.2	
Majority				
Turnout		1,251		
Liberal Democrats gain from Conservative		Swing		
Liberal Democrats gain from Conservative		Swing		

=== Stapleford South West ===
Stapleford South West
Party	Candidate	Votes	%	±%
Labour	John McGrath	630	50.7	
Labour	Ray Darby	543	43.7	
Green	Teresa Needham	297	23.9	
Liberal Democrats	Simon Frost	287	23.1	
Liberal Democrats	Bob Browne	274	22.0	
Conservative	William Longdon	209	16.8	
Majority				
Turnout		1,243		
Labour hold		Swing		
Labour hold		Swing		

=== Toton & Chilwell Meadows ===
Toton & Chilwell Meadows
Party	Candidate	Votes	%	±%
Conservative	Stephenie Kerry	1,209	52.4	
Conservative	Lee Fletcher	1,193	51.7	
Conservative	Halimah Khaled	1,139	49.4	
Liberal Democrats	Richard Madin	589	25.5	
Labour	Sonia Edmund	554	24.0	
Labour	Sophie Vale	548	23.8	
Labour	David Price	523	22.7	
Liberal Democrats	Julie Brough	463	20.1	
Liberal Democrats	Andrew Coxon	424	18.4	
Majority				
Turnout		2,307		
Conservative hold		Swing		
Conservative hold		Swing		
Conservative hold		Swing		

=== Watnall & Nuthall West ===
Watnall & Nuthall West
Party	Candidate	Votes	%	±%
Conservative	Jill Owen	762	60.7	
Conservative	Robert Willimott	715	57.0	
Labour	Simon Cross	288	22.9	
Labour	Maggie Fetter	276	22.0	
Liberal Democrats	Jack Beavis	183	14.6	
Liberal Democrats	Paul Sibert	155	12.4	
Majority				
Turnout		1,255		
Conservative hold		Swing		
Conservative hold		Swing		
