= Broxtowe Alliance =

Political party in Nottinghamshire, England

- Leader: Milan Radulovic
- Founded: 2 January 2025; 18 months ago
- Registered: 19 February 2025
- Split from: Labour Party
- Headquarters: Beeston, Nottinghamshire
- Colours: Green; Red
- Broxtowe Borough Council: 18 / 44
- Nottinghamshire County Council: 1 / 66

Website
- broxtoweindependents.org.uk

Broxtowe Alliance is a political party in the Borough of Broxtowe in Nottinghamshire, England. They form the minority administration of Broxtowe Borough Council.

== History ==
The party was formed as the Broxtowe Independents party in January 2025 by announcement of the defection of 20 formerly Labour councillors, one of whom also served on Nottinghamshire County Council. They had formed the council administration and those defecting included leader of the council Milan Radulovic. The councillors quit the Labour party, claiming that it had "abandoned traditional Labour values", with the new group notably expressing their opposition to the government's means testing of the Winter Fuel Payment, and the increase in bus fares. The group has said that they intend to run Broxtowe Borough Council in a minority administration in the short term. Two of the announced defectors ended up staying with the Labour Party, leaving the group with 18 councillors.

The group's joint statement claimed 10 of their councillors had been blocked from standing as Labour candidates for the 2025 Nottinghamshire County Council election of the 2025 United Kingdom local elections, which Labour denied.

One of the councillors, former deputy leader Greg Marshall, told The National: "[T]here have been policy positions at national level which weren't within General Election manifestos; winter fuel allowance for 11 million pensioners, abandonment of the Waspi women campaign, the Labour Party's response to Gaza. All of those things have been challenging".

The party's name was disputed by a preexisting group on Broxtowe Borough Council called the "Broxtowe Independent Group". They had been formed on 31 December 2024, and claimed that the naming was "causing unnecessary confusion". This eventually lead to the Broxtowe Independents being registered with the Electoral Commission as the "Broxtowe Alliance". The Broxtowe Independent Group also registered as a political party.

In May 2025, Broxtowe Alliance won their first seat on Nottinghamshire County Council, in Beeston Central and Rylands. Councillor Ross Bofinger died in August 2025 and Broxtowe Alliance retained his Stapleford seat at the by-election that December. In January 2026, the Regulator of Social Housing said that the Broxtowe Alliance-led borough council had "serious failings" in its housing stock. In February 2026, the Broxtowe Alliance administration raised council tax and drew on reserves to avoid cutting jobs and services.

Due to proposed Local Government Reorganisation, the Broxtowe Alliance is considering joining the Nottingham People's Alliance. Radulovic is planning to not stand again due to the reorganisation.

== See also ==
- Ashfield Independents
- Nottingham Independents
- List of Labour Party breakaway parties (UK)
