= Nottinghamshire =

County of England

- Non-metropolitan and ceremonial county
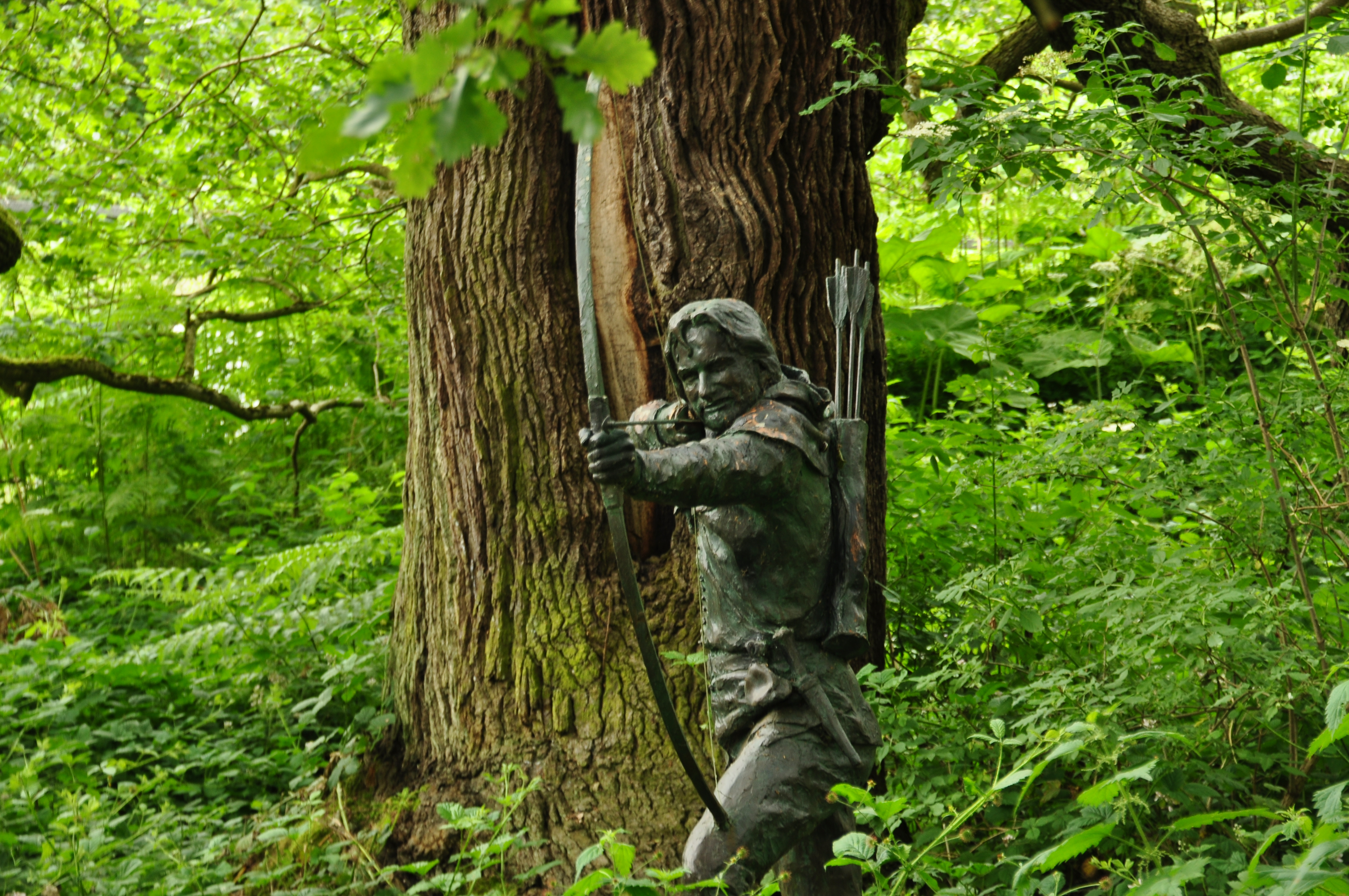
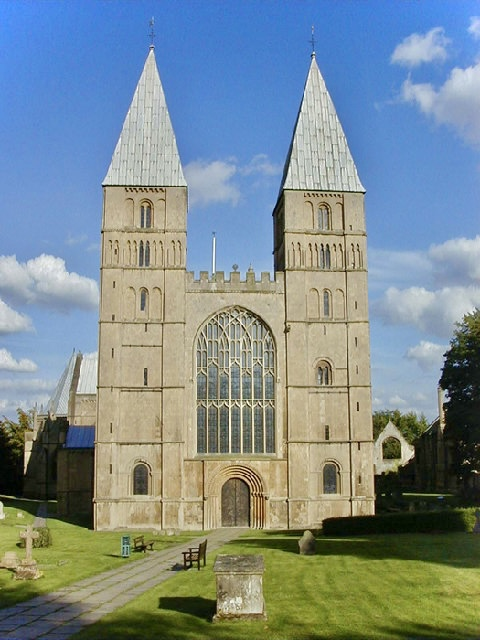
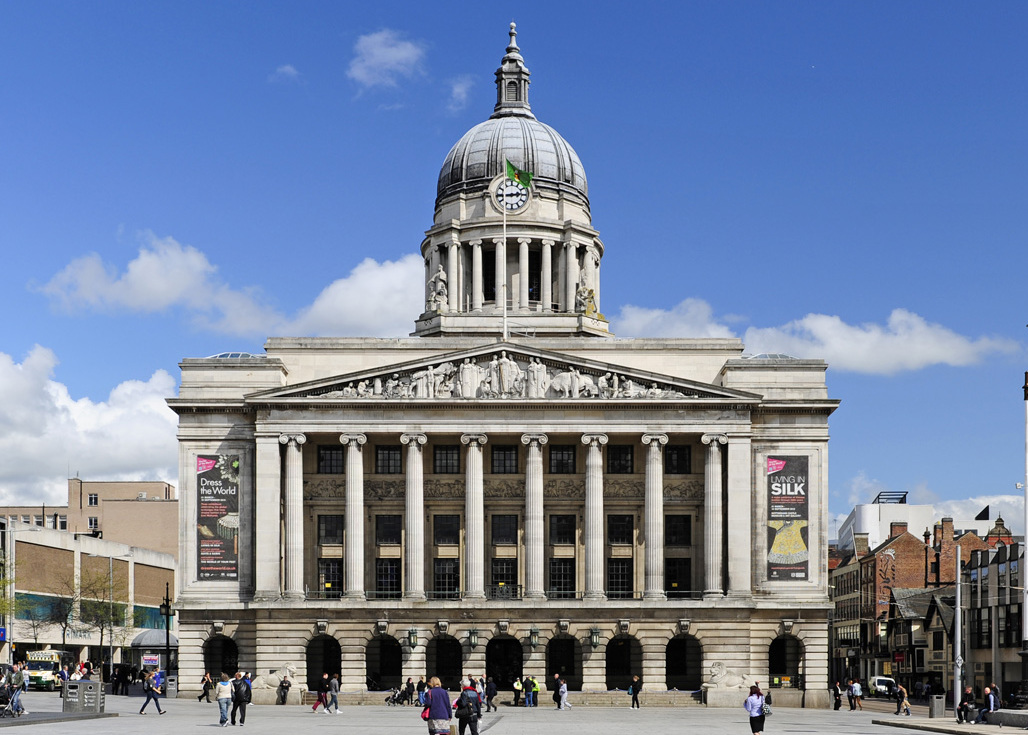
- Statue of Robin Hood in Sherwood Forest, Southwell Minster, and the Council House in Nottingham

- Nottinghamshire within England
- Coordinates: 53°N 1°W
- Sovereign state: United Kingdom
- Constituent country: England
- Region: East Midlands
- Established: Ancient
- Origin: c. 5th century
- Time zone: UTC+0 (GMT)
  - Summer (DST): UTC+1 (BST)
- UK Parliament: 8 MPs
- Police: Nottinghamshire Police
- Ceremonial county
- Lord Lieutenant: Professor Veronica Pickering
- High Sheriff: Merleta Bryan-Hilton
- Area: 2,159 km^{2} (834 sq mi)
  - Rank: 27th of 48
- Population (2024): 1,188,090
  - Rank: 15th of 48
  - Density: 550/km^{2} (1,400/sq mi)
- Non-metropolitan county
- County council: Nottinghamshire County Council
- Control: Reform UK
- Admin HQ: Oak House, Hucknall
- Area: 2,085 km^{2} (805 sq mi)
  - Rank: 14th of 21
- Population (2025): 862,326
  - Rank: 10th of 21
  - Density: 414/km^{2} (1,070/sq mi)
- ISO 3166-2: GB-NTT
- GSS code: E10000024
- ITL: TLF15/16
- Website: nottinghamshire.gov.uk
- Districts
- Districts of Nottinghamshire; Unitary County council area
- Districts: List: Nottingham; Bassetlaw; Mansfield; Newark and Sherwood; Ashfield; Gedling; Broxtowe; Rushcliffe

Nottinghamshire (/ˈnɒtɪŋəmʃər, -ʃɪər/; abbreviated Notts.) is a ceremonial county in the East Midlands of England. The county is bordered by South Yorkshire to the north-west, Lincolnshire to the east, Leicestershire to the south, and Derbyshire to the west. The largest settlement is the city of Nottingham.

The county has an area of 2,160 km^{2} (830 sq mi) and had an estimated population of 1,188,090 in 2024. Nottingham is in the south-west of the county, which is the most densely populated area. Other settlements include Worksop in the north-west, Newark-on-Trent in the east, and Mansfield in the west. For local government purposes Nottinghamshire comprises a non-metropolitan county, with seven districts, and the Nottingham unitary authority area. The East Midlands Combined County Authority includes Nottinghamshire County Council and Nottingham City Council.

The geography of Nottinghamshire is largely defined by the River Trent, which forms a wide valley which crosses the county from the south-west to the north-east. North of this, in the centre of the county, is Sherwood Forest, the remnant of a large ancient woodland.

== History ==
Nottinghamshire lies on the Roman Fosse Way, and there are Roman settlements in the county; for example at Mansfield, and forts such as at the Broxtowe Estate in Bilborough. The county was settled by Angles around the 5th century, and became part of the Kingdom, and later Earldom, of Mercia. However, there is evidence of Anglo-Saxon settlement at the Broxtowe Estate, Oxton, near Nottingham, and Tuxford, east of Sherwood Forest. The name first occurs in 1016, but until 1568, the county was administratively united with Derbyshire, under a single Sheriff. In Norman times, the county developed malting and woollen industries.

The village of Edwinstowe close to Sherwood Forest took the name from Edwin of Northumbria, who died in 633 nearby and was provisionally buried in St Mary's Church, Edwinstowe.

William the Conqueror in 1066 made Sherwood Forest a Royal Forest for hunting which was frequently visited by the Mercian and later Kings.

William's 1086 Domesday Book identified certain areas in Nottinghamshire being under the land of King Edward the Confessor these included Mansfield and Sutton in Ashfield, amongst other places including Skegby, Dunham-on-Trent, East Drayton, East Markham, Farnsfield, Warsop, Carburton, Edwinstowe, Carlton-on-Trent, Budby, Perlethorpe and Walesby.

King John's Palace ruin near Kings Clipstone was a royal residence for King John, the area being near to Sherwood Forest. King John's Palace was a place where William I met Richard I to congratulate him on his return from the crusades. King John died at Newark Castle in 1216.

During the Industrial Revolution, the county held much needed minerals such as coal and iron ore, and had constructed some of the first experimental waggonways in the world; an example of this is the Wollaton wagonway of 1603–1616, which transported minerals from bell pit mining areas at Strelley and Bilborough, this led to canals and railways being constructed in the county, and the lace and cotton industries grew. In the 18th and 19th centuries, mechanised deeper collieries opened, and mining became an important economic sector. Although there are no remaining working mines in Nottinghamshire now.

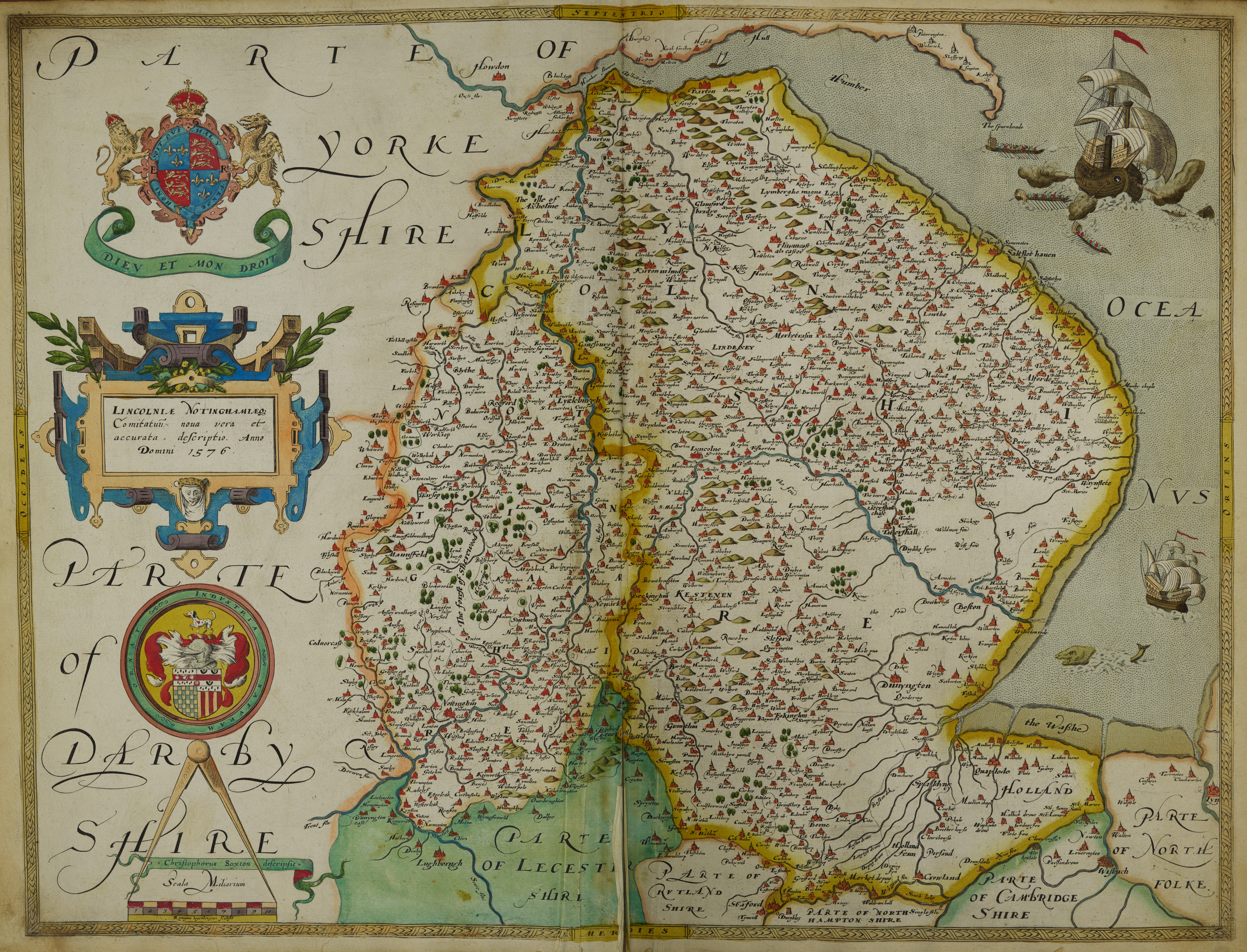
Hand-drawn map of Lincolnshire and Nottinghamshire from 1576.

Until 1610, Nottinghamshire was divided into eight Wapentakes. Sometime between 1610 and 1719, they were reduced to six – Newark, Bassetlaw, Thurgarton, Rushcliffe, Broxtowe, and Bingham, some of these names still being used for the modern districts. Oswaldbeck was absorbed in Bassetlaw, of which it forms the North Clay division, and Lythe in Thurgarton.

Mansfield and surrounding areas in Nottinghamshire in the 17th century became the centre of nonconformism in separation from the Church of England. In particular Mansfield became the birthplace of the Quakers with George Fox living in the town.

Nottinghamshire is famous for its involvement with the legend of Robin Hood. This is also the reason for the numbers of tourists who visit places like Sherwood Forest, City of Nottingham, and the surrounding villages in Sherwood Forest. To reinforce the Robin Hood connection, the University of Nottingham in 2010 has begun the Nottingham Caves Survey, with the goal "to increase the tourist potential of these sites". The project "will use a 3D laser scanner to produce a three dimensional record of more than 450 sandstone caves around Nottingham".

Nottinghamshire was mapped first by Christopher Saxton in 1576; the first fully surveyed map of the county was by John Chapman, who produced Chapman's Map of Nottinghamshire in 1774. The map was the earliest printed map at a sufficiently useful scale (one statute mile to one inch) to provide basic information on village layout, and the existence of landscape features such as roads, milestones, tollbars, parkland, and mills.

Nottinghamshire saw a slight change to its overall boundary in the extreme northern part of the county in 1974, when the villages of Blaxton, Finningley and Auckley (part) were merged into the Doncaster in South Yorkshire.

== Physical geography ==
Interactive map of Nottinghamshire and city/districts

Nottinghamshire, like Derbyshire, and South Yorkshire, sits on extensive coal measures, up to 900 metres (3,000 feet) thick, and occurring largely in the north of the county. There is an oilfield near Eakring. These are overlaid by sandstones and limestones in the west, and clay in the east. The north of the county is part of the Humberhead Levels lacustrine plain. The centre and south west of the county, around Sherwood Forest, features undulating hills with ancient oak woodland. Principal rivers are the Trent, Idle, Erewash, and Soar. The Trent, fed by the Soar, Erewash, and Idle, composed of many streams from Sherwood Forest, run through wide and flat valleys, merging at Misterton. A point just north of Newtonwood Lane, on the boundary with Derbyshire is the highest point in Nottinghamshire; at 205 metres (673 feet), while Silverhill, a spoil heap left by the former Silverhill colliery, a human-made point often cited as the highest, reaches 204 metres (669 feet). The lowest is Peat Carr, east of Blaxton, at sea level; the Trent is tidal below Cromwell Lock.

Nottinghamshire is sheltered by the Pennines to the west, so receives relatively low rainfall at 641 to 740 millimetres (25 to 29 inches) annually. The average temperature of the county is 8.8–10.1 degrees Celsius (48–50 degrees Fahrenheit). The county receives between 1321 and 1470 hours of sunshine per year.

=== Green belt ===
Nottinghamshire contains one green belt area, first drawn up from the 1950s. Completely encircling the Nottingham conurbation, it stretches for several miles into the surrounding districts, and extends into Derbyshire.

== Politics ==
Nottinghamshire, including the city of Nottingham, is represented by eleven members of parliament; nine for the Labour Party, and two Reform UK MPs

Following the 2025 County Council election, Nottinghamshire County Council is controlled by Reform. The party went from having a single councillor before the election to winning a majority of the council's seats. The council is currently made up of 41 Reform UK councillors, 18 Conservatives, four Labour and three from local parties. Prior to the 2025 election, the council had been fully or partially controlled by the Conservative Party since 2017. The council had historically been under Labour control; the party held a majority on the council from 1981 to 2009.

Local government is devolved to seven local borough and district councils. Ashfield is controlled by the Ashfield Independents. Bassetlaw, Gedling and Mansfield are Labour-controlled. Newark and Sherwood is controlled by a coalition of Labour, Liberal Democrat and independent councillors. Rushcliffe is Conservative-controlled. Broxtowe is run by a minority Broxtowe Alliance administration. Nottingham City Council, which governs the Nottingham unitary authority and is independent of Nottinghamshire County Council, is majority Labour-controlled.

=== Future ===
In July 2026, the UK Government announced that it intends to reorganise local government in Nottinghamshire by April 2028. Two unitary authority areas will cover the county. One will include Nottingham and its hinterland, an area larger than the current Nottingham district, and other will cover the remainder of the county. Shadow elections to the new unitary authorities will take place in May 2027.

=== Westminster Parliamentary ===
General Election 2024: Nottinghamshire
Labour	Conservative	Reform	Green	Lib Dem	Others	Turnout
201,998 (41.5%) ▼2,013	119,325 (24.5%) ▼139,469	94,331 (19.4%) ▲78,409	30,517 (6.3%) ▲20,142	22,827 (4.7%) ▼10,758	17,559 (3.6%) ▼5,682	486,557 ▼59,287

Overall number of seats in 2024
Labour	Conservative	Reform	Green	Lib Dem	Others
9 ▲6	1 ▼7	1 ▲1	0	0	0

=== Political control ===
Nottinghamshire is a non-metropolitan county, governed by Nottinghamshire County Council and seven non-metropolitan district councils. Elections to the county council take place every four years, with the first election taking place in 1973. Following each election, the county council has been controlled by the following parties:

Year	Party	Details
1973	Labour	details
1977	Conservative	details
1981	Labour	details
1985	Labour	details
1989	Labour	details
1993	Labour	details
1997	Labour	details
2001	Labour	details
2005	Labour	details
2009	Conservative	details
2013	Labour	details
2017	no overall control	details
2021	Conservative	details
2025	Reform	details

== Economy and industry ==
The regional economy was traditionally based on industries such as coal mining in the Leen Valley, and manufacturing. Since the invention of the knitting frame by local William Lee, the county, in particular Nottingham, became synonymous with the lace industry.

In 1998, Nottinghamshire had a gross domestic product (GDP) per-capita of £12,000, and a total GDP of £12,023 million. This is compared to a per-capita GDP of £11,848 for the East Midlands, £12,845 for England, and £12,548 for the United Kingdom. Nottingham had a GDP per-capita of £17,373, North Nottinghamshire £10,176, and South Nottinghamshire £8,448. In October 2005, the United Kingdom had 4.7% unemployment, the East Midlands 4.4%, and the Nottingham commuter belt area 2.4%.

== Education ==
=== Secondary education ===
The county has comprehensive secondary education with 47 state secondary schools, as well as 10 private schools. The City of Nottingham local education authority (LEA) has 18 state schools and six independent schools, not including sixth form colleges.

A total of 9,700 pupils took GCSEs in the Nottinghamshire LEA in 2007. The best results were from the West Bridgford School, closely followed by Rushcliffe Spencer Academy and the Minster School in Southwell. In Nottingham, the best results came from the Trinity Catholic School and the Fernwood School in Wollaton.

At A-level, the highest performing institution was The Becket School, followed by the West Bridgford School. Some of Nottingham city best results tend to come from Nottingham High School, closely followed by the all-female Nottingham High School for Girls, both of which are privately run.

Worksop College is another private school near to Worksop.

=== Higher education ===
The University of Nottingham is a Russell Group university, offering one of the broadest selections of courses in the UK. Nottingham Trent University is one of the post-1992 universities of the UK. Nottingham is home to a campus of the University of Law. All three of these institutions combine to make Nottingham one of England's largest student cities. Nottingham Trent University also has an agricultural college near Southwell, while the University of Nottingham has one at Sutton Bonington.

== Culture ==
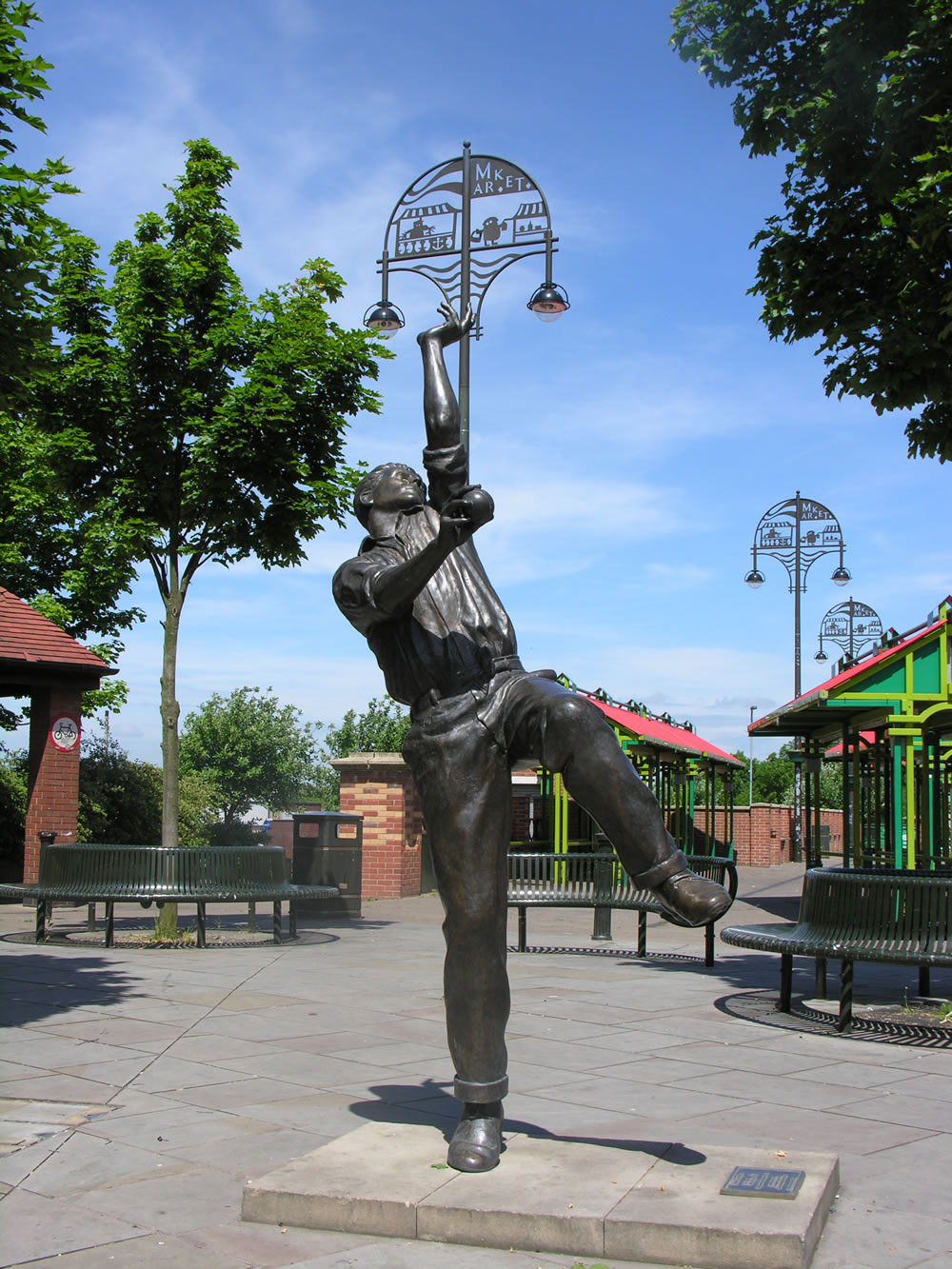
National and County cricket player Harold Larwood

Nottinghamshire is home to the Sherwood Forest, known for its association with the legend of Robin Hood.

Nottinghamshire contains the ancestral home of the poet Lord Byron, Newstead Abbey, which he sold in 1818. It is now owned by Nottingham City Council, and is open to the public. The acclaimed author D. H. Lawrence was from Eastwood in Nottinghamshire. Toton was the birthplace and home of English folk singer-songwriter Anne Briggs, well known for her song Black Waterside. The north of the county is also noteworthy for its connections with the Pilgrim Fathers. William Brewster, for example, came from the village of Scrooby, and was influenced by Richard Clyfton, who preached at Babworth.

Nottinghamshire has international twinning arrangements with the province of Wielkopolska (Greater Poland) in western Poland, and with the province's capital city, Poznań.

In 2002, Crocus nudiflorus (Autumn crocus) was voted by the public as the county flower of Nottinghamshire.

=== Sport ===
Nottinghamshire County Cricket Club (NCCC) are a first class county cricket club who play at Trent Bridge in West Bridgford. They won the County Championship in 2010.

The most successful football team within Nottinghamshire is Nottingham Forest, a Premier League club that won the 1978 English championship, and followed it up with winning the 1979 and 1980 European Cup titles although success has not been seen by most of their fans in living memory. Notts County and Mansfield Town of League One are the other professional teams in the county. Notts County are the world's oldest professional football club, being formed in 1862 and are world renowned for giving Juventus their black and white striped kit and opening their new stadium in 2011.

Other notable sporting teams are the Nottingham Rugby Football Club, and the Nottingham Panthers Ice Hockey Club.

=== Flag ===
The unofficial flag of Nottinghamshire

An unofficial flag for Nottinghamshire was created through a design competition organised by BBC Radio Nottingham, and registered with the vexillological charity the Flag Institute in 2011. It consists of a green field, on which is a red cross fimbriated (bordered) with white, on which a white shield containing the green figure of an archer is superimposed.

== Media ==
=== Television ===
BBC East Midlands is based in Nottingham and broadcasts news around the county; ITV Central also covers regional news in the county. Northern parts of the county such as Bassetlaw and Mansfield receive a better signals from the Emley Moor TV transmission so the area is covered by BBC Yorkshire and ITV Yorkshire (West). Ashfield and parts of Newark get better signals from the Belmont TV tranmsitter that broadcast BBC Yorkshire and Lincolnshire and ITV Yorkshire (East).

=== Radio ===
Radio stations for the county are:

BBC Local Radio

- BBC Radio Nottingham broadcast county-wide
- BBC Radio Sheffield (covering Bassetlaw)

Independent Local Radio

- Hits Radio East Midlands,
- Greatest Hits Radio East Midlands
- Greatest Hits Radio South Yorkshire (covering Bassetlaw)
- Capital Midlands,
- Gold
- Smooth East Midlands

Community Radio

- Kemet FM (for Nottingham)
- Mansfield 103.2 FM (serving Mansfield and Ashfield)
- Radio Newark (serving Newark)
- Bowe Radio (for Ollerton and Edwinstowe)

=== Newspapers ===
The Nottingham Post is the county's local newspaper.

== Districts and boroughs ==
=== Areas ===
Administrative area (post 1974)	Administrative centre (post 1974)	Main settlements
Ashfield	Kirkby-in-Ashfield	Sutton-in-Ashfield, Annesley, Hucknall
Bassetlaw	Worksop (also a non-constituent member of the South Yorkshire Mayoral Combined Authority)	Retford, Askham, Carlton in Lindrick, Harworth, Bircotes, Elmton-with-Cresswell
Broxtowe	Beeston	Kimberley, Stapleford, Attenborough, Bramcote, Chilwell
City of Nottingham	Nottingham (County town of Nottinghamshire)	Bulwell, Bestwood, Sneinton, Clifton, Aspley, Radford, Basford, Hyson Green, Wollaton
Gedling	Arnold	Carlton, Burton Joyce, Colwick, Ravenshead, Gedling, Netherfield
Mansfield	Mansfield	Rainworth (part), Forest Town, Mansfield Woodhouse, Warsop
Newark and Sherwood	Newark-on-Trent	Southwell, Ollerton, Edwinstowe, Rainworth (part), Farnsfield, Sutton-on-Trent
Rushcliffe	West Bridgford	East Leake, Ruddington, Bingham, Cotgrave, Tollerton, Keyworth, Radcliffe-on-Trent

=== Settlements and features ===
The traditional county town, and the largest settlement in the historic and ceremonial county boundaries, is the City of Nottingham. The city is now administratively independent, but towns including Arnold, Beeston, Carlton, Hucknall, Stapleford and West Bridgford are still within the administrative county, and Hucknall is where the county council are based (West Bridgford prior to 2025).

There are several market towns in the county. Newark-on-Trent is a bridging point of the Fosse Way and River Trent, but is actually an Anglo-Saxon market town with a now ruined castle. Mansfield, the second-largest settlement in the county after Nottingham, sits on the site of a Roman settlement, but grew after the Norman Conquest. Worksop, in the north of the county, is also an Anglo-Saxon market town which grew rapidly in the Industrial Revolution, with the arrival of canals and railways and the discovery of coal. Other market towns include Arnold, Bingham, Hucknall, Kirkby-in-Ashfield, Tuxford, Retford and Sutton-in-Ashfield.

The main railway in the county is the Midland Main Line, which links London to Sheffield via Nottingham. The Robin Hood Line between Nottingham and Worksop serves several villages in the county. The East Coast Main Line from London to Doncaster, Leeds, York, Newcastle upon Tyne, and Scotland serves the eastern Nottinghamshire towns of Newark and Retford.

The M1 motorway runs through the county, connecting Nottingham to London, Leeds, and Leicester by road. The A1 road follows for the most part the path of the Great North Road, although in places it diverges from the historic route where towns have been bypassed. Retford was by-passed in 1961, and Newark-on-Trent was by-passed in 1964, and the A1 now runs between Retford and Worksop past the village of Ranby. Many historic coaching inns can still be seen along the traditional route.

East Midlands Airport is just outside the county in Leicestershire, while Doncaster Sheffield Airport lies within the historic boundaries of Nottinghamshire. These airports serve the county and several of its neighbours. Together, the airports have services to most major European destinations, and East Midlands Airport now also has services to North America and the Caribbean. As well as local bus services throughout the county, Nottingham and its suburbs have a tram system, Nottingham Express Transit.

Nottingham and its surrounding areas form part of the Nottingham Urban Area while Bassetlaw is a non-constituent part of the Sheffield City Region.

== Places of interest ==
- Attenborough Nature Reserve
- Beauvale Priory
- Beth Shalom Holocaust Centre
- Brierley Forest Park
- Centre Parcs, Sherwood Forest.
- Clumber Park National Trust
- Creswell Crags
- D. H. Lawrence Birthplace Museum
- Felley Priory
- Green's Windmill and Science Centre
- Hardwick Hall and Park (a small part of which is in Nottinghamshire)
- The Harley Gallery
- Hawton Church
- King John's Palace
- Mansfield Museum
- Mr Straw's House National Trust
- Newark Air Museum
- Newark Castle, Nottinghamshire
- Newstead Abbey
- Nottingham Castle
- Papplewick Pumping Station
- Rufford Country Park
- Rushcliffe Country Park
- Sherwood Forest
- Sherwood Observatory
- Sherwood Pines Forest Park
- Silverhill, Nottinghamshire
- Southwell Minster and Archbishop's Palace
- St Mary's Church, Edwinstowe
- Sundown Adventureland
- Teversal
- The Royal Lancers and Nottinghamshire Yeomanry Museum
- The Workhouse, Southwell National Trust
- Thoresby Hall and Park
- Welbeck Abbey
- Wheelgate Park
- White Post Farm
- Wollaton Hall
- Wollaton Park
- Worksop Priory
- Ye Olde Trip To Jerusalem

== See also ==
- High Sheriff of Nottinghamshire
- List of English and Welsh endowed schools (19th century)#Nottinghamshire
- Lord Lieutenant of Nottinghamshire
- Nottinghamshire Police and Crime Commissioner
