= Nottinghamshire County Council elections =

Nottinghamshire County Council elections are held every four years. Nottinghamshire County Council is the upper-tier authority for the non-metropolitan county of Nottinghamshire in England. Since the last boundary changes in 2017, 66 county councillors have been elected from 56 electoral divisions.

== Council elections ==
Year	Labour	Conservative	Liberal Democrats (Note: Includes totals for the predecessors of the Liberal Democrats, the Liberal Party and SDP (both of which participated in the Alliance).)	Reform	UKIP	Ashfield Ind.	Mansfield Ind.	Independents & Others	Council control after election
Local government reorganisation; council established (89 seats)
1973	54	35	0	–	–	–	–	0	Labour
1977	20	66	1	–	–	–	–	2 (Note: 2 Residents Association)	Conservative
New division boundaries; seats decreased from 89 to 88
1981	55	32	0	–	–	–	–	1 (Note: 1 Residents Association)	Labour
1985	48	37	2	–	–	–	–	1	Labour
1989	50	34	4	–	–	–	–	0	Labour
1993	58	24	6	–	–	–	–	0	Labour
Nottingham becomes a unitary authority; seats decreased from 88 to 63
1997	42	17	4	–	0	–	–	0	Labour
2001	40	20	3	–	0	–	–	0	Labour
New division boundaries; seats increased from 63 to 67
2005	38	25	4	–	0	–	–	0	Labour
2009	13	35	9	–	1	–	6	3 (Note: Including 1 Selston Parish Independent)	Conservative
2013	34	21	8	–	0	–	2	2 (Note: Including 1 Selston Parish Independent)	Labour
New division boundaries; seats decreased from 67 to 66
2017	23	31	1	–	0	5	4	2 (Note: Including 1 Selston Parish Independent)	No overall control
2021	15	37	1	0	0	10	0	3	Conservative
2025	4	17	0	40	0	1	0	2 (Note: Including 1 Broxtowe Alliance)	Reform

=== County result maps ===
2025 results map

2021 results map

2017 results map

2013 results map

2009 results map

2005 results map

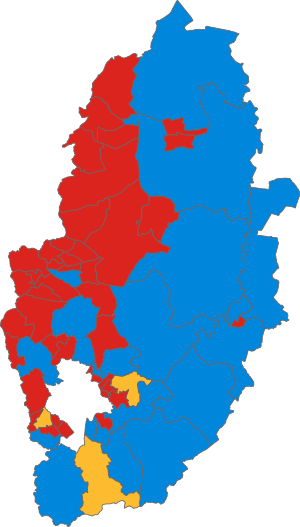
2001 results map

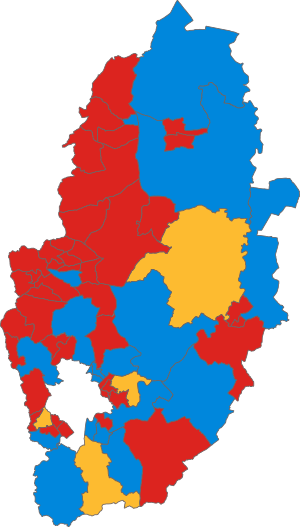
1997 results map

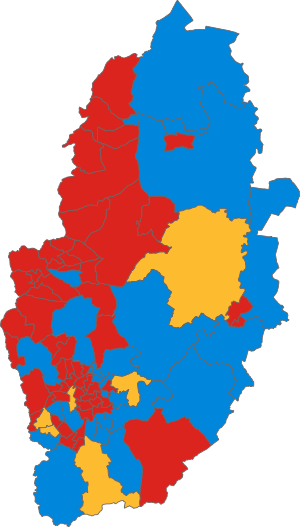
1993 results map

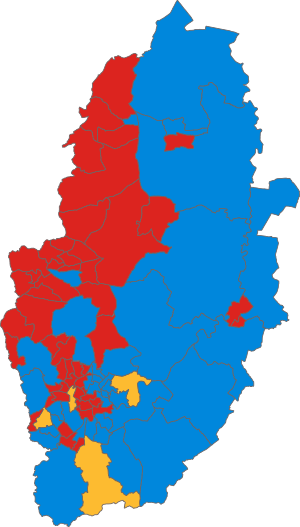
1989 results map

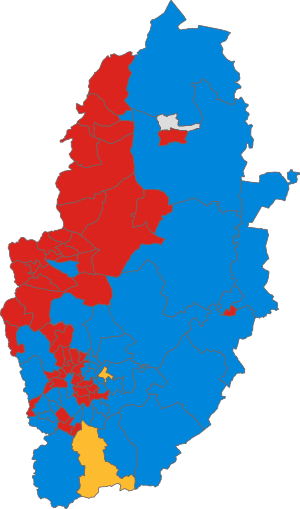
1985 results map

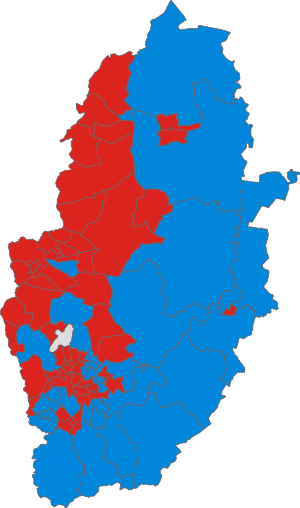
1981 results map

== By-election results ==
=== 1997-2001 ===
Nottingham Wilford By-Election 7 August 1997
Party	Candidate	Votes	%	±%
Conservative		835	61.6	+20.1
Labour		457	33.7	−16.1
Liberal Democrats		64	4.7	−4.0
Majority		378	27.9	
Turnout		1,356		
Conservative gain from Labour		Swing		

Blidworth By-Election 1 June 2000
Party	Candidate	Votes	%	±%
Labour		746	71.3	
Conservative		301	28.7	
Majority		445	42.6	
Turnout		1,047	14.8	
Labour hold		Swing		

=== 2001-2005 ===
Southwell By-Election 21 March 2002
Party	Candidate	Votes	%	±%
Conservative	Andy Stewart	1,895	65.2	+17.3
Liberal Democrats	J M Baker	813	28.0	+0.6
Labour	C Westmorland	197	6.8	+0.0
Majority		1,082	37.2	
Turnout		2,905	25.1	
Conservative hold		Swing		

Chilwell By-Election 27 June 2002
Party	Candidate	Votes	%	±%
Conservative	Richard Jackson	1,488	46.5	+9.1
Labour		1,163	36.3	−6.5
Liberal Democrats		552	17.2	+2.2
Majority		325	10.2	
Turnout		3,203	35.8	
Conservative gain from Labour		Swing		

=== 2005-2009 ===
Mansfield East By-Election 28 September 2006
Party	Candidate	Votes	%	±%
Labour	Helen Holt	1,228	38.0	+3.5
Conservative	Ken Rees	628	19.4	+1.0
Independent	Syd Owen	620	19.2	+2.0
Liberal Democrats	Phillip Smith	544	16.8	−0.3
Green	Paul Frost	214	6.6	−2.2
Majority		600	18.6	
Turnout		3,234	17.5	
Labour hold		Swing		

Hucknall By-Election 25 January 2007
Party	Candidate	Votes	%	±%
Conservative	Michael Murphy	1,597	32.5	+0.3
Labour	John Wilmott	1,554	31.6	−18.2
Liberal Democrats	Harry Toseland	1,007	20.5	+20.5
UKIP	Peter Foulkes	413	8.4	+8.4
Green	Mark Harrison	350	7.1	−4.5
Majority		43	0.9	
Turnout		4,921	21.2	
Conservative gain from Labour		Swing		

Sutton in Ashfield North By-Election 22 March 2007
Party	Candidate	Votes	%	±%
Liberal Democrats	Jason Zadrozny	1,979	73.1	+59.2
Labour	David Parker	435	16.1	−28.7
Conservative	Peter Thorpe	222	8.2	−15.6
UKIP	Peter Foulkes	70	2.6	+2.6
Majority		1,544	57.0	
Turnout		2,706	31.6	
Liberal Democrats gain from Labour		Swing		

Newark East By-Election 17 September 2009
Party	Candidate	Votes	%	±%
Conservative	Stuart Wallace	517	45.2	−6.4
Liberal Democrats	Chris Harrison	322	28.1	−2.3
Labour	Glenn Bardill	198	17.3	−0.7
UKIP	Terry Coleman	107	9.4	+9.4
Majority		195	17.1	
Turnout		1,144	15.6	
Conservative hold		Swing		

Mansfield South By-Election 25 February 2010
Party	Candidate	Votes	%	±%
Labour	Chris Winterton	1,342	33.5	+13.4
Mansfield Independent Forum	Andrew Tristram	1,108	27.6	−12.7
Conservative	Drew Stafford	774	19.3	−9.2
UKIP	Nick Bennet	489	12.2	+12.2
Liberal Democrats	Danielle Gent	295	7.4	−3.8
Majority		234	5.9	
Turnout		4,008	20.9	
Labour gain from Independent		Swing		

=== 2009-2013 ===
Chilwell & Toton By-Election 15 March 2012
Party	Candidate	Votes	%	±%
Conservative	John Doddy	1,958	47.7	+5.9
Liberal Democrats	David Watts	1,375	33.5	+20.6
UKIP	Lee Waters	682	16.6	+7.0
Majority		583	14.2	
Turnout		4,102	25.6	
Conservative hold		Swing		

Rufford By-Election 20 September 2012
Party	Candidate	Votes	%	±%
Labour	John Peck	1,557	58.0	+27.8
Conservative	Daniel Mottishaw	660	24.6	−9.7
Nottinghamshire Independents	Jim Gregson	346	12.9	−22.7
UKIP	Carole Terzza	123	4.6	+4.6
Majority		897	33.4	
Turnout		2,686	24.52	
Labour gain from Nottinghamshire Independents		Swing		

=== 2013-2017 ===
Bingham by-election 4 August 2016
Party	Candidate	Votes	%	±%
Conservative	Francis Purdue-Horan	1,270	44.0	+2.2
Independent	Tracey Kerry	1,232	42.7	N/A
Labour	Alan Walker	382	13.2	−7.0
Majority		38	1.3	
Turnout		2,890	28.1	
Conservative hold		Swing		

=== 2021-2025 ===
Collingham by-election 17 February 2022
Party	Candidate	Votes	%	±%
Independent	Debbie Darby	2,009	63.8	+63.8
Conservative	Jack Kellas	898	28.5	−11.7
Labour	Jennifer Kaye	244	7.7	+7.7
Majority		1,111	35.3	
Turnout		2,890		
Independent hold		Swing		

Eastwood by-election 3 November 2022
Party	Candidate	Votes	%	±%
Independent	Kane Oliver	1,223	43.1	+43.1
Labour	Milan Radulovic	1,182	41.7	−0.1
Conservative	Mick Brown	431	15.2	−31.2
Majority		41	1.4	
Turnout		2,836		
Independent gain from Conservative		Swing		

Kirkby South by-election 4 May 2023
Party	Candidate	Votes	%	±%
Ashfield Ind.	Rachel Madden	1,680	51.2	−7.0
Labour	Lorraine Fagan	1,017	31.0	+8.5
Conservative	Sam Howlett	584	17.8	−1.5
Majority		663	20.2	
Turnout		3,281		
Ashfield Ind. hold		Swing		

=== 2025-2029 ===
Newark West by-election 3 July 2025
Party	Candidate	Votes	%	±%
Conservative	Keith Girling	680	34.7	+4.8
Reform	Caroline Hinds	672	34.3	−1.6
Labour	Paul Taylor	316	16.1	−4.0
Green	Matthew Spoors	190	9.7	+2.1
Liberal Democrats	Rosemary Johnson Sabine	90	4.6	−1.9
SDP	Andrew Leatherland	11	0.6	+0.6
Majority		8	0.4	
Turnout		1,959		
Conservative gain from Reform		Swing		

Southwell by-election 29 October 2026
Party	Candidate	Votes	%	±%
Conservative	Penny Rainbow	2,019	45.3	+7.8
Reform	Edward Stubbs	1,159	26.0	+1.8
Labour	Tracey Jevons-Hazzard	646	14.5	+1.1
Liberal Democrats	Keith Melton	545	12.2	−7.5
Green	Matthew Spoors	88	2.0	−3.1
Majority		860	19.3	
Turnout		4,457		
Conservative hold		Swing		
