= Wheelgate Park =

Theme and water park in Nottinghamshire, England

Coordinates: 53°06′33″N 1°03′55″W

Wheelgate Park is a 30-acre family theme park and water park in Farnsfield, Nottinghamshire, England. The park includes two large indoor play centres, a farm and a water park.

Formerly known as Wonderland Adventure Park, in 2007 the park became part of Bendalls Leisure which also owns Twinlakes Theme Park in Melton Mowbray and Woodlands Family Theme Park in Devon. The name changed to Wheelgate Park together with redevelopment and expansion. In December 2012, it became "Robin Hoods Wheelgate Park" after development to build a water-park which opened at the beginning of 2013. The site is also a location for UK Escape Games.

== Animal life ==
Throughout the park there are places where children can see and visit animals. The animals in the Animal Adventure Zone include rabbits, goats, ponies, snakes and other reptiles, a mongoose, llamas, pigs and birds.

== Play zones ==
There are numerous play zones within the park each having a specific associated theme.
