= 1997 Nottinghamshire County Council election =

English local election

← 1993	1 May 1997	2001 →

All 63 seats to Nottinghamshire County Council 32 seats needed for a majority
	First party	Second party	Third party
Party	Labour	Conservative	Liberal Democrats
Seats won	42	17	4
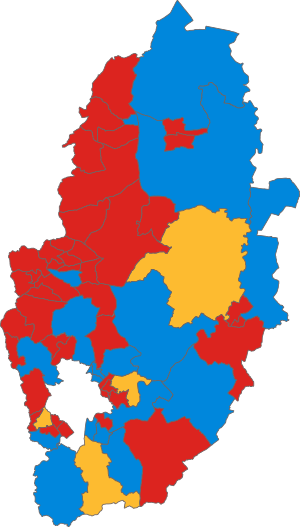
- Map of the results of the election in each division. Colours denote the winning party, as shown in the main table of results.
Council control before election
Labour
Council control after election
Labour

The 1997 Nottinghamshire County Council election was held on Thursday, 1 May 1997. The whole council was up for election and the result was the Labour Party retaining its control of the council.

This was the first County Council election not to include the City of Nottingham, which would become a unitary authority in 1998 and therefore no longer a part of the administrative county of Nottinghamshire. The boundaries of the electoral divisions remained the same however the loss of Nottingham meant that there were 25 fewer seats.

== Election results ==
Result of Nottinghamshire County Council election, 1997
Party	Seats	Gains	Losses	Net gain/loss	Seats %	Votes %	Votes	+/−
Labour	42					48.4		
Conservative	17					34.7		
Liberal Democrats	4					15.6		

== Results by electoral division ==
=== Ashfield ===
(9 seats, 9 electoral divisions)

==== Hucknall East ====
Hucknall East
Party	Candidate	Votes	%	±%
Labour	Chris Baron	5,038	71.0	
Conservative	Stephen Glover	2,055	29.0	
Turnout		7,093	70.7	
Registered electors		10,031		

==== Hucknall West ====
Hucknall West
Party	Candidate	Votes	%	±%
Labour	Nellie Smedley	6,476	68.7	
Conservative	John Tomlinson	2,955	31.3	
Turnout		13,175	100.0	
Registered electors		13,175		

==== Kirkby in Ashfield North ====
Kirkby in Ashfield North
Party	Candidate	Votes	%
Labour	Richard Needham	Unopposed	

==== Kirkby in Ashfield South ====
Kirkby in Ashfield South
Party	Candidate	Votes	%	±%
Labour	Gordon Young	4,857	65.6	
Conservative	Aubrey Hobson	2,550	34.4	
Turnout		7,407	70.9	
Registered electors		10,451		

==== Selston ====
Selston
Party	Candidate	Votes	%	±%
Labour	Joan Taylor	3,951	58.5	
Conservative	Gillian Renshaw	1,729	25.6	
Liberal Democrats	Robert Sears-Piccavey	1,070	15.9	
Turnout		6,750	69.9	
Registered electors		9,654		
