= Woodlands Family Theme Park =

Amusement park in Devon, England

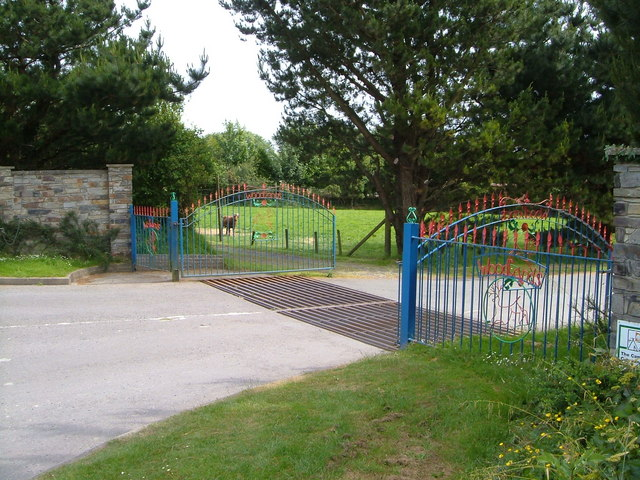
- Woodlands Leisure Park
- Interactive map of Woodlands Family Theme Park
- Location: Dartmouth, Devon, England
- Coordinates: 50.3563°N 3.67158°W
- Opened: 1989
- Owner: Bendalls Leisure Ltd
- General manager: Chris Bendall
- Slogan: "Guaranteed all weather fun"
- Operating season: March – November
- Area: 90 acres (36 ha)

Attractions
- Total: 16
- Water rides: 3
- Website: www.woodlandspark.com

Woodlands Family Theme Park is an all-weather family amusement park and falconry display on the A3122 road, 5 miles from Dartmouth, in South Devon, England. It is part of Bendalls Leisure Ltd which also owns Twinlakes Theme Park and Wheelgate Park.

Set in Devon's countryside, Woodlands has over 90 acres (36 ha) of family attractions including 16 rides, as well as around 500 animals. The falconry display has over 50 birds of prey. During the October half term the park hosts a Halloscream Week.

Designed by the Bendall family there are several play zones throughout the park, each having a selection of rides and attractions. The large indoor playcentres at Woodlands contain venture equipment, soft play and rides.

== History ==
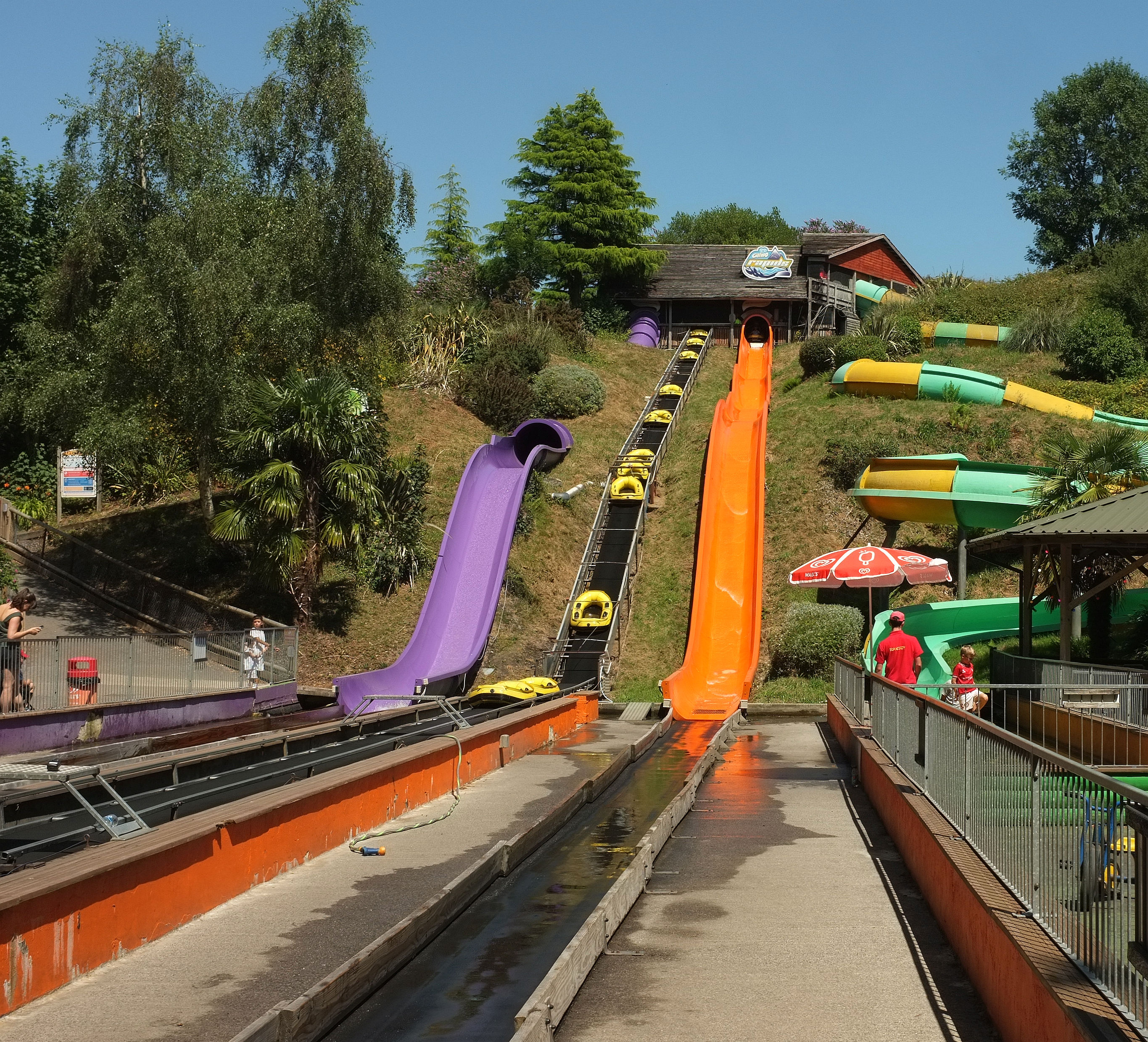
Water slides

The site was purchased by the Bendall family in 1971 as a 200-acre dairy farm and diversified in 1989 to a 90-acre leisure park and caravan park. It remains a family owned company, Bendalls Leisure Ltd. The layout, café, shop, buildings, play equipment and landscaping all designed by family Bendall members.

The first year that the park opened saw 60,000 visitors. The average annual Leisure Park visitor numbers are now around 350,000.

In July 2025, after inspections by the UK's Health and Safety Executive, nine rides at Woodlands Family Theme Park were closed. The rides were later reopened.
