= Kay Cutts =

British politician

Kathrine Lilian Cutts MBE (born 30 October 1942) is a British former Conservative Party county councillor who served as the Leader of Nottinghamshire County Council from 2017 to 2021. Cutts announced her intended retirement from politics in late 2020, with a confirmation that she would not stand at the 2021 elections.

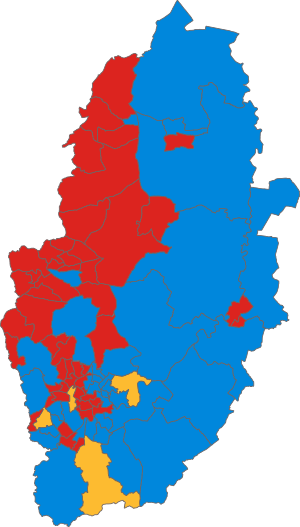
Nottinghamshire in 1989, when she first won her seat

== Career ==
Cutts began as a parish councillor for Normanton-on-the-Wolds in 1962. She sat on Rushcliffe Borough Council.

She was first elected to the county council on 4 May 1989, representing the Radcliffe-on-Trent ward. The county council then also included Nottingham, with the council having 50 Labour and 34 Conservative councillors. She became Leader of the Conservative Group on the county council in October 2000.

The Conservatives gained control of the council in the 2009 election.

In the 2014 New Year Honours, she received the MBE.

Civic offices
Preceded by Alan Rhodes	Leader of Nottinghamshire County Council; May 2017–May 2021	Succeeded by Ben Bradley
Preceded by David Kirkham	Leader of Nottinghamshire County Council; May 2009– May 2013	Succeeded by Alan Rhodes
