= Nottingham Caves Survey =

Research project to map the caves under the city of Nottingham, England

The Nottingham Caves Survey was a research project the aim of which was to scan every accessible cave from the 700+ man-made sandstone caves that are known to be present in the city of Nottingham. It was conducted by Trent and Peak Archaeology, at the University of Nottingham. It was managed by Dr David Strange-Walker with Julia Clarke, with documentary research undertaken by Scott Lomax. The final report was compiled by Dr David Knight (York Archaeology, former Trent & Peak Archaeology), Dr Emily Stammitti (Trent & Peak Archaeology) and Gordon Young. The project was funded primarily by both the Greater Nottingham Partnership, who have an interest in utilising the caves for increasing tourism and helping grow the local economy, and English Heritage, who are motivated by an interest in preserving the remaining heritage of Nottingham.

The project built upon the data held by Nottingham City Council and that collected in the 1980s as part of the British Geological Survey (BGS), where all the known caves of Nottingham were recorded into the BGS register. Nottingham City Council's Urban Archaeological Database (UAD) was a key resource. The Nottingham Caves Survey team visited some of the caves listed in the BGS register, asked permission from the owner to view the cave, and if the conditions were suitable, scanned the cave structure using a 3D laser scanner. The laser scanner builds up a 'point cloud' by collecting billions of survey points, which make up the black and white 3D images. Fish-eye photographs were taken from exactly the same position on the tripod around 360 degrees. The 'point cloud' can be merged with the photographs and manipulated to make plans, animations and fly-through videos, available on the project website.

The Nottingham Caves Survey recorded data from an eclectic range of cave systems, from the famous Mortimer's Hole and King David's Dungeon at Nottingham Castle, the cave complexes of the renowned Ye Olde Trip to Jerusalem, Ye Olde Salutation Inn and The Bell Inn - claimed to be three of the oldest inns in England - to the cave cellars of houses dotted around the city, as each are considered to have a unique story to tell. The project commenced in 2010, with the surveying completed in 2012. In total 64 caves were surveyed.

The project has received widespread press, due to the possible implications on well known Nottingham lore like that of the famous legend of Robin Hood, by such varied media outlets as ThisIsNottingham, BBC News, Science Daily and the New York Times. The project has also received positive attention for the environmental policies of the surveying team, as most of the equipment was transported between sites in trailers by bicycles.
