= 1993 Nottinghamshire County Council election =

Local election in England

- 6 May 1993

All 88 seats to Nottinghamshire County Council 45 seats needed for a majority
	First party	Second party	Third party
Party	Labour	Conservative	Liberal Democrats
Seats before	50	34	4
Seats won	58	24	6
Seat change	▲8	▼10	▲2
Popular vote	136,474	91,999	42,781
Percentage	49.10%	33.10%	15.39%
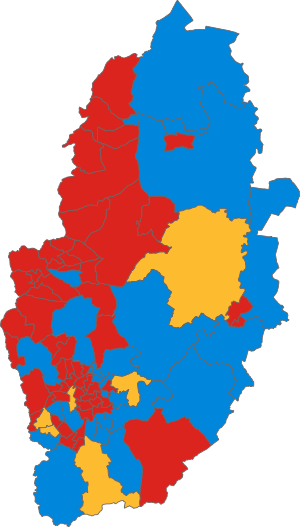
- Map of the results of the election in each division. Colours denote the winning party, as shown in the main table of results.
Council control before election
Labour
Council control after election
Labour

The 1993 Nottinghamshire County Council election was held on Thursday, 6 May 1993. The whole council of eighty-eight members was up for election.

The Labour Party retained control of the Council, increasing its number of councillors to fifty-eight. The Conservatives suffered a net loss of ten seats and won twenty-four councillors. The Liberal Democrats won six seats.

== Results by division ==
Each electoral division returned one county councillor. The candidate elected to the council in each electoral division is shown in the table below. "Unopposed" indicates that the councillor was elected unopposed.

Electoral Division	Party	Councillor	Votes
Arnold Central	Conservative	R. Kempster	1,559
Arnold East	Conservative	V. Pepper	1,865
Arnold West	Conservative	M. Shepherd	1,421
Balderton	Conservative	K. Walker	1,656
Beeston North	Labour	M. Tewson	1,499
Beeston South	Labour	M. Warner	1,965
Bingham	Conservative	P. Curry	2,299
Blidworth	Labour	R. Hilton	1,865
Blyth & Harworth	Labour	H. Hunter	Unopposed
Bramcote & Stapleford East	Liberal Democrat	D. Morton	2,305
Calverton	Labour	J. Stocks	2,303
Carlton Central	Labour	B. Bowker	1,504
Carlton East	Liberal Democrat	R. Poynter	2,673
Carlton South	Conservative	H. Stanley	1,880
Carlton West	Conservative	T. Roach	1,441
Caunton	Liberal Democrat	A. Wood	1,915
Chilwell	Liberal Democrat	T. Miller	1,643
Collingham	Conservative	V. Dobson	1,670
Cotgrave	Labour	J. Stobbart	1,925
East Leake	Conservative	K. O'Toole	1,888
Eastwood & Brinsley	Labour	D. Pettitt	2,178
Greasley & Nuthall	Conservative	J. Taylor	2,137
Hucknall East	Labour	J. Barker	2,828
Hucknall West	Labour	N. Smedley	3,485
Keyworth	Conservative	S. Pattinson	1,929
Kimberley & Trowell	Labour	R. Pettitt	1,663
Kirkby-in-Ashfield North	Labour	J. Thierry	2,133
Kirkby-in-Ashfield South	Labour	G. Young	2,189
Mansfield - Cumberlands & Ladybrook	Labour	M. Newton	1,993
Mansfield - Leeming & Forest Town	Labour	P. Tsimbiridis	1,747
Mansfield - Northfield & Manor	Labour	R. Strauther	1,744
Mansfield - Oak Tree & Lindhurst	Labour	T. Butler	1,637
Mansfield - Oakham & Berry Hill	Conservative	E. Cheesewright	1,380
Mansfield - Pleasley Hill & Broomhill	Labour	J. Carter	1,938
Mansfield - Ravensdale & Sherwood	Labour	J. Bosnjak	1,569
Mansfield - Titchfield & Eakring	Labour	C. Winteron	1,717
Misterton	Conservative	K. Bullivant	1,635
Newark North	Labour	D. Green	1,758
Newark South	Labour	C. Bromfield	1,340
Newstead	Conservative	J. Lonergan	1,655
Nottingham - Abbey	Conservative	M. Brandon-Bravo	1,767
Nottingham - Aspley	Labour	L. Unczur	1,585
Nottingham - Basford	Labour	I. Aziz	1,389
Nottingham - Beechdale	Labour	T. Bell	1,875
Nottingham - Bestwood Park	Labour	B. Grocock	1,935
Nottingham - Bilborough	Labour	M. Whittall	1,518
Nottingham - Bridge	Labour	G. Gawith	2,430
Nottingham - Bulwell East	Labour	M. Walton	1,857
Nottingham - Bulwell West	Labour	F. Riddell	1,353
Nottingham - Byron	Labour	A. Chewings	1,834
Nottingham - Clifton East	Labour	A. Palmer	1,593
Nottingham - Clifton West	Labour	I. Malcolm	1,822
Nottingham - Greenwood	Labour	G. Skinner	1,569
Nottingham - Lenton	Labour	E. Campbell	1,734
Nottingham - Manvers	Labour	M. Aslam	1,491
Nottingham - Mapperley	Labour	M. Edwards	1,481
Nottingham - Portland	Labour	D. Woodward	1,457
Nottingham - Radford	Labour	M. Aslam	1,776
Nottingham - Robin Hood	Liberal Democrat	G. Long	1,715
Nottingham - Sherwood	Labour	B. Parbutt	1,747
Nottingham - St. Anns	Labour	M. Riasat	1,830
Nottingham - Strelley	Labour	P. Burgess	1,260
Nottingham - Trent	Labour	A. Khan	1,305
Nottingham - Wilford	Labour	G. Jackson	1,725
Nottingham - Wollaton	Conservative	J. Hayes	2,093
Ollerton	Labour	S. Smedley	3,192
Radcliffe-on-Trent	Conservative	K. Cutts	1,376
Retford North	Conservative	J. Bush	1,485
Retford South	Labour	M. Storey	1,685
Ruddington	Liberal Democrat	S. Bennett	2,320
Rufford	Labour	P. Brearley	2,413
Selston	Labour	J. Taylor	1,903
Southwell	Conservative	S. Stuart	2,133
Stapleford North & West	Labour	G. Miller	1,881
Sutton-in-Ashfield Central	Labour	W. Shaw	1,979
Sutton-in-Ashfield East	Labour	T. Barsby	1,874
Sutton-in-Ashfield North	Labour	J. Anthony	1,894
Sutton-in-Ashfield West	Labour	D. Kirkham	1,975
Toton & Attenborough	Conservative	T. Pettengell	1,806
Tuxford	Conservative	J. Hempsall	1,742
Warsop	Labour	B. Smith	2,153
West Bridgford East	Conservative	B. Borrett	1,388
West Bridgford South	Conservative	M. Cox	1,885
West Bridgford West	Conservative	G. Hill	1,834
Worksop East	Labour	B. Larcombe	1,449
Worksop North & Carlton	Labour	D. Boardman	1,766
Worksop South East & Welbeck	Labour	V. Smailes	1,192
Worksop West	Labour	A. Davison	1,723
