= 1977 Nottinghamshire County Council election =

1977 UK local government election

← 1973	5 May 1977	1981 →

All 89 seats to Nottinghamshire County Council 45 seats needed for a majority
	First party	Second party
Party	Conservative	Labour
Seats before	35	54
Seats won	66	20
Seat change	▲31	▼34
Popular vote	182,154	108,027
Percentage	56.12%	33.28%
	Third party	Fourth party
Party	RA	Liberal
Seats before	0	0
Seats won	2	1
Seat change	▲2	▲1
Popular vote	14,058	11,916
Percentage	4.33%	3.67%
Council control before election
Labour
Council control after election
Conservative

The 1977 Nottinghamshire County Council election was held on Thursday, 5 May 1977. The election resulted in a landslide victory for the Conservative Party, which won 66 of the 89 seats on the county council. The Labour Party won just 20 seats, compared to 54 at the previous election.

== Results by division ==
Each electoral division returned either one, two or three county councillors. The candidate elected to the council in each electoral division is shown in the table below. "Unopposed" indicates that the councillor was elected unopposed.

Electoral Division	Party	Councillor	Votes
Arnold East	Conservative	J. Clarke	3,340
Arnold South	Conservative	M. Sermon	4,377
Arnold West	Conservative	R. Griffin	2,535
Balderton	Conservative	N. Davy	2,832
Basford No. 1 (Newthorpe)	Conservative	C. Minkley	4,026
Basford No. 2	Conservative	H. Tildsley	1,955
Basford No. 3	Conservative	D. Langham	3,106
Basford No. 4	Conservative	J. Gardiner	2,016
Basford No. 5	Conservative	R. Dickson	2,927
Basford No. 6	Conservative	H. Bird	4,897
Basford No. 6	Conservative	L. Kelly	4,725
Beeston & Stapleford (Bramcote)	Conservative	C. Cooper	3,316
Beeston & Stapleford (Chilwell)	Conservative	E. Hudson	2,989
Beeston & Stapleford North	Conservative	R. Cox	2,494
Beeston & Stapleford South	Conservative	N. Hughes	2,328
Beeston & Stapleford (Stapleford)	Conservative	J. Streeter	2,194
Beeston & Stapleford (Toton and Attenborough)	Conservative	G. Bottomley	3,013
Bingham No. 1	Conservative	G. Wade	3,315
Bingham No. 2	Conservative	F. Hobson	2,977
Bingham No. 3	Conservative	D. Jeffreys	2,612
Bingham No. 4	Conservative	S. Pattison	3,632
Bridgford North	Conservative	F. Woodward	1,839
Bridgford South	Conservative	P. Wright	2,928
Bridgford West	Conservative	B. Fairs	3,547
Carlton No. 1	Conservative	B. Noble	5,371
Carlton No. 1	Conservative	W. Edwards	5,324
Carlton No. 2	Conservative	H. Stanley	5,109
Carlton No. 2	Conservative	D. Shirt	4,955
Collingham	Conservative	E. Yates	1,872
East Retford Rural No. 1	Conservative	C. Hempsall	2,409
East Retford Rural No. 2	Conservative	F. Rudder	3,639
Eastwood	Labour	D. Pettitt	1,482
Hucknall East	Residents' association	E. Morley	2,391
Hucknall North	Residents' association	J. Parker	3,456
Kirkby-in-Ashfield East	Labour	S. Booler	1,786
Kirkby-in-Ashfield West	Conservative	J. Radford	2,401
Mansfield No. 1 (East)	Labour	F. Warsop	1,059
Mansfield No. 2 (South East)	Conservative	P. Caley	1,950
Mansfield No. 3 (South)	Conservative	W. Brown	3,565
Mansfield No. 4	Labour	W. Morris	3,321
Mansfield No. 4	Labour	M. Gallagher	3,215
Mansfield Woodhouse	Labour	B. Whitelaw	3,149
Mansfield Woodhouse	Labour	D. Haynes	3,147
Newark No. 1 (South)	Conservative	S. Stuart	1,992
Newark No. 2	Conservative	V. Dobson	2,876
Nottingham No. 1 (Bridge & Trent)	Conservative	E. Collin	3,232
Nottingham No. 1 (Bridge & Trent)	Conservative	R. Tuck	3,229
Nottingham No. 1 (Bridge & Trent)	Conservative	P. Lowery	3,227
Nottingham No. 2 (Lenton)	Conservative	B. Borrett	2,906
Nottingham No. 2 (Lenton)	Conservative	A. Pollard	2,820
Nottingham No. 3 (Manvers & St. Anns)	Conservative	K. Stevens	2,464
Nottingham No. 3 (Manvers & St. Anns)	Conservative	K. Thompson	2,262
Nottingham No. 4 (Market)	Conservative	W. Williams	738
Nottingham No. 5 (Byron & St. Alban)	Conservative	H. Bonser	5,482
Nottingham No. 5 (Byron & St. Alban)	Conservative	R. Stevenson	5,456
Nottingham No. 5 (Byron & St. Alban)	Labour	F. Riddell	5,384
Nottingham No. 6 (Forest & Mapperley)	Conservative	J. Jenkin-Jones	6,534
Nottingham No. 6 (Forest & Mapperley)	Conservative	E. Chambers	6,442
Nottingham No. 6 (Forest & Mapperley)	Conservative	E. Baker	6,380
Nottingham No. 7 (Portland & Radford)	Conservative	D. Watson	4,083
Nottingham No. 7 (Portland & Radford)	Conservative	E. Hand	3,997
Nottingham No. 7 (Portland & Radford)	Conservative	H. Whitehead	3,962
Nottingham No. 8 (Abbey & University)	Conservative	G. Cragg	8,801
Nottingham No. 8 (Abbey & University)	Conservative	M. Spungin	8,779
Nottingham No. 8 (Abbey & University)	Conservative	M. Whittaker	8,743
Nottingham No. 9 (Clifton)	Labour	G. Dobson	2,711
Nottingham No. 9 (Clifton)	Conservative	H. Moss	2,680
Nottingham No. 10 (Robin Hood & Broxtowe)	Conservative	D. Bailey	4,106
Nottingham No. 10 (Robin Hood & Broxtowe)	Labour	W. Case	4,099
Nottingham No. 10 (Robin Hood & Broxtowe)	Labour	E. Foster	4,018
Nottingham No. 11 (Woolaton)	Conservative	H. Smith	3,129
Nottingham No. 11 (Woolaton)	Conservative	A. Berkeley	2,961
Retford North	Conservative	A. Wright	1,879
Retford South	Conservative	A. Clark	1,934
Southwell No. 1	Conservative	B. Haigh	4,623
Southwell No. 2	Conservative	A. Stewart	3,076
Southwell No. 3 (Ollerton)	Labour	S. Smedley	2,065
Southwell No. 4	Conservative	E. McCarthy	2,569
Southwell No. 5	Labour	M. Gray	Unopposed
Sutton-in-Ashfield East	Labour	A. Bennett	1,505
Sutton-in-Ashfield North	Conservative	S. Wakeland	1,402
Sutton-in-Ashfield South	Labour	W. Shaw	1,892
Sutton-in-Ashfield West	Labour	M. Lee	1,486
Warsop	Liberal	D. Chambers	1,809
Worksop No. 1 (East)	Labour	W. Bloomer	2,789
Worksop No. 2 (North)	Labour	A. Burton	1,849
Worksop No. 3	Conservative	C. Naish	2,146
Worksop Rural No. 1 (Blyth)	Labour	L. Hince	2,026
Worksop Rural No. 2	Labour	L. Smith	1,514
