= Eunice Campbell-Clark =

Black woman councillor, Nottinghamshire

Eunice Campbell-Clark (1954–) OBE is a retired councillor who was elected as the first Black female Councillor for Nottinghamshire County Council in 1989 and in 1996, Nottingham City's first Black female Councillor.

== Career ==
Eunice was born in Trelawny, Jamaica, and moved to the UK in 1968 to join her parents. She started working for Nottingham City Council in the Youth Training Agency and joined the National Association of Local Government Officers (NALGO), becoming a member of their Black Steering Group. She went on to manage and run a number of initiatives in Nottingham aimed at improving employment chances for local women.

As a teenager she had joined the Black People's Freedom Movement, taking a particular interest in education and the positive influence it could potentially have on young people. She went on to work closely with schools and voluntary groups providing support for underachieving Black children, closely monitoring the performance of the city's schools and was governor for two local schools.

She carried out work in the Jamaican and BAME communities, promoting Covid-19 vaccinations and raising awareness of prostate cancer and the need for regular check-ups (Hear Me Now Campaign). Campbell-Clark was a Portfolio Holder at Nottingham City Council, helping to run services and make positive changes, such as the introduction of Changing Places toilets for people with disabilities. She served on the Race Equality and Advisory Committee and her executive roles included Access to Services, Equalities and HR, and Adults and Health. She was responsible for implementing three joint service centres across the City at Clifton Cornerstone, Mary Potter in Hyson Green, and Bulwell Riverside as well as day centres (Martin Jackaman, Albany House, and Cherry Tree Day Centre). In 2016 Eunice was elected as Vice President, the first Caribbean woman to represent the Council of Europe and the Congress of Regions. She was also involved in driving forward the environmental agenda of her husband (fellow City Councillor Alan Clark following his death in 2017.

== Career in politics ==
After joining the Labour Party in 1983 and the Party's Equal Opportunities Consultative Group, Campbell-Clark stood as a candidate in Nottinghamshire County Council's 1989 election representing the Lenton and Park Ward, gaining a majority of over 1000 votes and becoming the first female Black, Asian, Minority Ethnic (BAME) Councillor of Nottinghamshire County Council.

== Honours ==
Campbell-Clark was made an Alderwoman of Nottingham in 2023. She was awarded an OBE in 2024 for her services to local government having served as a Councillor in the County and City for 36 years.
