= 1985 Nottinghamshire County Council election =

1985 UK local government election

← 1981	2 May 1985	1989 →

All 88 seats to Nottinghamshire County Council 45 seats needed for a majority
	First party	Second party
Party	Labour	Conservative
Seats before	55	32
Seats won	48	37
Seat change	▼7	▲5
Popular vote	133,761	124,618
Percentage	40.29%	37.53%
	Third party	Fourth party
Party	Alliance	Independent
Seats before	0	0
Seats won	2	1
Seat change	▲2	▲1
Popular vote	69,511	2,469
Percentage	20.93%	0.74%
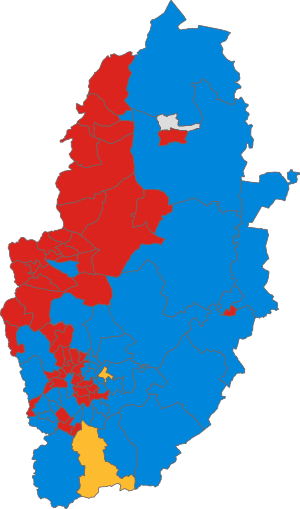
- Map of the results of the election in each division. Colours denote the winning party, as shown in the main table of results.
Council control before election
Labour
Council control after election
Labour

The 1985 Nottinghamshire County Council election was held on Thursday, 2 May 1985. The whole council of eighty-eight members was up for election and the result was that the Labour Party retained control of the Council, winning forty-eight seats. The Conservatives won thirty-seven councillors and the SDP–Liberal Alliance made gains in terms of percentage vote share, but won just two seats. An Independent councillor was elected in the Retford North division.

== Results by division ==
Each electoral division returned one county councillor. The candidate elected to the council in each electoral division is shown in the table below. "Unopposed" indicates that the councillor was elected unopposed.

Electoral Division	Party	Councillor	Votes
Arnold Central	Conservative	R. Griffin	2,343
Arnold East	Conservative	T. Roach	1,916
Arnold West	Conservative	A. Dalton	1,870
Balderton	Conservative	W. Keeton	2,317
Beeston North	Conservative	J. Dwan	1,504
Beeston South	Labour	M. Warner	1,715
Bingham	Conservative	K. Thompson	2,659
Blidworth	Labour	L. Jones	1,999
Blyth & Harworth	Labour	T. Nicholson	2,117
Bramcote & Stapleford East	Conservative	M. Cornish	2,256
Calverton	Conservative	E. Collin	1,793
Carlton Central	SDP–Liberal Alliance	R. Poynter	2,161
Carlton East	Conservative	H. Stanley	2,412
Carlton South	Conservative	P. Read	1,940
Carlton West	Conservative	B. Noble	1,776
Caunton	Conservative	R. Tow	2,643
Chilwell	Conservative	E. Hudson	1,945
Collingham	Conservative	E. Yates	1,880
Cotgrave	Conservative	D. Jeffreys	2,220
East Leake	Conservative	D. Lingham	2,401
Eastwood & Brinsley	Labour	D. Pettitt	2,143
Greasley & Nuthall	Conservative	C. Minkley	2,703
Hucknall East	Labour	W. Whitehouse	2,312
Hucknall West	Labour	D. Philby	2,463
Keyworth	Conservative	S. Pattinson	2,698
Kimberley & Trowell	Conservative	A. Briggs	2,070
Kirkby-in-Ashfield North	Labour	J. Thierry	2,159
Kirkby-in-Ashfield South	Labour	G. Young	2,074
Mansfield - Cumberlands & Ladybrook	Labour	K. Williams	1,815
Mansfield - Leeming & Forest Town	Labour	P. Turnbull-Edmunds	1,765
Mansfield - Northfield & Manor	Labour	B. Whitelaw	1,621
Mansfield - Oak Tree & Lindhurst	Labour	T. Butler	1,147
Mansfield - Oakham & Berry Hill	Conservative	E. Cheesewright	2,024
Mansfield - Pleasley Hill & Broomhill	Labour	W. Morris	1,497
Mansfield - Ravensdale & Sherwood	Labour	F. Warsop	1,592
Mansfield - Titchfield & Eakring	Labour	C. Winterton	1,539
Misterton	Conservative	G. Berry	2,700
Newark North	Conservative	V. Dobson	1,670
Newark South	Labour	C. Bromfield	1,778
Newstead	Conservative	L. Kelly	1,783
Nottingham - Abbey	Conservative	M. Whittaker	1,855
Nottingham - Aspley	Labour	F. Price	1,701
Nottingham - Basford	Labour	J. Heppell	1,996
Nottingham - Beechdale	Labour	W. Churchill	1,882
Nottingham - Bestwood Park	Labour	W. Higgins	1,889
Nottingham - Bilborough	Labour	M. Cowan	1,263
Nottingham - Bridge	Labour	A. Mullender	2,594
Nottingham - Bulwell East	Labour	S. Tipping	1,728
Nottingham - Bulwell West	Labour	F. Riddell	1,963
Nottingham - Byron	Labour	V. Bell	2,065
Nottingham - Clifton East	Labour	A. Palmer	1,603
Nottingham - Clifton West	Labour	G. Dobson	1,861
Nottingham - Greenwood	Conservative	R. Tuck	1,746
Nottingham - Lenton	Labour	M. Aslam	2,114
Nottingham - Manvers	Labour	A. Simpson	2,095
Nottingham - Mapperley	Conservative	E. Chambers	1,621
Nottingham - Portland	Labour	D. Woodward	1,250
Nottingham - Radford	Labour	I. Clark	2,464
Nottingham - Robin Hood	Conservative	A. Shaftoe	1,571
Nottingham - Sherwood	Conservative	J. Jenkin-Jones	1,685
Nottingham - St. Anns	Labour	M. Riasat	1,952
Nottingham - Strelley	Labour	E. Hoskin	1,511
Nottingham - Trent	Labour	R. Stenson	1,480
Nottingham - Wilford	Conservative	J. Armstrong-Holmes	1,657
Nottingham - Wollaton	Conservative	J. Hayes	2,647
Ollerton	Labour	S. Smedley	3,161
Radcliffe-on-Trent	Conservative	F. Hobson	1,874
Retford North	Independent	A. Wright	1,641
Retford South	Labour	S. Clark	1,777
Ruddington	SDP–Liberal Alliance	S. Bennett	2,042
Rufford	Labour	M. Gray	2,251
Selston	Labour	J. Taylor	1,793
Southwell	Conservative	T. Butcher	3,422
Stapleford North & West	Labour	G. Miller	2,266
Sutton-in-Ashfield Central	Labour	W. Shaw	1,643
Sutton-in-Ashfield East	Labour	T. Barsby	1,837
Sutton-in-Ashfield North	Labour	J. Anthony	1,757
Sutton-in-Ashfield West	Labour	R. Walters	1,703
Toton & Attenborough	Conservative	G. Bottomley	1,615
Tuxford	Conservative	J. Hempsall	2,194
Warsop	Labour	F. Taylor	2,771
West Bridgford East	Conservative	B. Borrett	1,751
West Bridgford South	Conservative	P. Wright	2,226
West Bridgford West	Conservative	B. Fiars	1,856
Worksop East	Labour	F. Groves	2,291
Worksop North & Carlton	Labour	A. Burton	2,270
Worksop South East & Welbeck	Labour	S. Rolstone	Unopposed
Worksop West	Labour	A. Davison	1,825
