= Kemet FM =

Radio station in Nottingham, England

97.5 Kemet FM is an urban radio station in Nottingham, England. Founded by Marceline Powell in 2007, its focus is on the music and culture of the city's African and Caribbean communities.
