= 1981 Nottinghamshire County Council election =

1981 UK local government election

← 1977	7 May 1981	1985 →

All 88 seats to Nottinghamshire County Council 45 seats needed for a majority
	First party	Second party	Third party
Party	Labour	Conservative	RA
Seats before	20	66	2
Seats won	55	32	1
Seat change	▲35	▼34	▼1
Popular vote	150,910	121,675	5,504
Percentage	46.95%	37.85%	1.71%
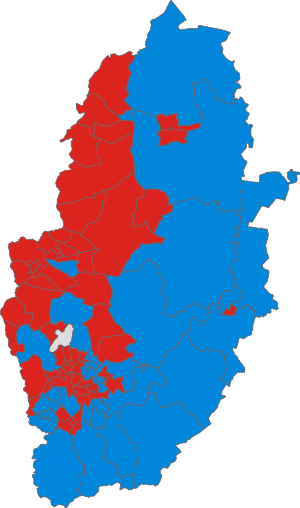
- Map of the results of the election in each division. Colours denote the winning party, as shown in the main table of results.
Council control before election
Conservative
Council control after election
Labour

The 1981 Nottinghamshire County Council election was held on Thursday, 7 May. Following boundary changes to the county's electoral divisions, the whole council of eighty-eight members was up for election. The Labour Party regained control from the Conservatives, winning fifty-five seats. The Conservatives won thirty-two councillors and one Residents' association councillor was elected in the Hucknall East division.

== Results by division ==
Each electoral division returned one county councillor. The candidate elected to the council in each electoral division is shown in the table below.

Electoral Division	Party	Councillor	Votes
Arnold Central	Conservative	R. Griffin	2,531
Arnold East	Labour	T. Lee	1,717
Arnold West	Conservative	L. Pollard	2,091
Balderton	Conservative	W. Keeton	2,084
Beeston North	Conservative	J. Dwan	1,637
Beeston South	Labour	M. Warner	1,700
Bingham	Conservative	G. Wade	2,632
Blidworth	Labour	L. Jones	2,413
Blyth & Harworth	Labour	L. Hince	3,071
Bramcote & Stapleford East	Conservative	C. Cooper	2,371
Calverton	Labour	A. Palmer	1,877
Carlton Central	Labour	G. Skinner	1,708
Carlton East	Conservative	H. Stanley	2,266
Carlton South	Labour	G. Niasbitt	2,621
Carlton West	Conservative	B. Noble	1,927
Caunton	Conservative	A. Stewart	2,842
Chilwell	Conservative	E. Hudson	2,406
Collingham	Conservative	E. Yates	1,955
Cotgrave	Conservative	D. Jeffreys	1,882
East Leake	Conservative	D. Langham	2,615
Eastwood & Brinsley	Labour	D. Pettitt	2,901
Greasley & Nuthall	Conservative	C. Minkley	2,494
Hucknall East	Residents' association	E. Morley	2,529
Hucknall West	Labour	D. Philby	2,140
Keyworth	Conservative	S. Pattinson	2,724
Kimberley & Trowell	Labour	M. McDougall	1,842
Kirkby-in-Ashfield North	Labour	J. Thierry	3,139
Kirkby-in-Ashfield South	Labour	P. Lewis	2,928
Mansfield - Cumberlands & Ladybrook	Labour	K. Williams	2,080
Mansfield - Leeming & Forest Town	Labour	P. Turnbull-Edmonds	1,959
Mansfield - Northfield & Manor	Labour	B. Whitelaw	2,020
Mansfield - Oak Tree & Lindhurst	Labour	G. Foster	1,480
Mansfield - Oakham & Berry Hill	Conservative	E. Cheesewright	2,205
Mansfield - Pleasley Hill & Broomhill	Labour	W. Morris	2,136
Mansfield - Ravensdale & Sherwood	Labour	F. Warsop	1,791
Mansfield - Titchfield & Eakring	Labour	C. Winterton	1,567
Misterton	Conservative	F. Rudder	1,742
Newark North	Conservative	V. Dobson	1,603
Newark South	Labour	C. Bromfield	1,950
Newstead	Conservative	P. Read	1,754
Nottingham - Abbey	Conservative	M. Whittaker	1,939
Nottingham - Aspley	Labour	W. Case	1,970
Nottingham - Basford	Labour	J. Heppell	1,875
Nottingham - Beechdale	Labour	W. Churchill	1,618
Nottingham - Bestwood Park	Labour	F. Higgins	2,082
Nottingham - Bilborough	Labour	M. Cowan	1,519
Nottingham - Bridge	Labour	M. Yuill	2,430
Nottingham - Bulwell East	Labour	S. Tipping	1,628
Nottingham - Bulwell West	Labour	F. Riddell	2,375
Nottingham - Byron	Labour	V. Bell	2,542
Nottingham - Clifton East	Labour	V. Lloyd	1,599
Nottingham - Clifton West	Labour	G. Dobson	1,899
Nottingham - Greenwood	Conservative	R. Tuck	1,593
Nottingham - Lenton	Labour	M. Aslam	1,641
Nottingham - Manvers	Labour	G. Edwards	2,010
Nottingham - Mapperley	Conservative	E. Chambers	1,665
Nottingham - Portland	Labour	R. Howard	1,885
Nottingham - Radford	Labour	I. Clark	2,615
Nottingham - Robin Hood	Labour	M. Wain	1,480
Nottingham - Sherwood	Conservative	J. Jenkin-Jones	1,716
Nottingham - St. Anns	Labour	F. Price	1,762
Nottingham - Strelley	Labour	E. Hoskin	1,616
Nottingham - Trent	Labour	G. Chambers	1,443
Nottingham - Wilford	Labour	A. Slater	1,639
Nottingham - Wollaton	Conservative	M. Spungin	2,708
Ollerton	Labour	S. Smedley	3,601
Radcliffe-on-Trent	Conservative	F. Hobson	1,573
Retford North	Labour	C. Grove	1,445
Retford South	Labour	E. Carter	1,502
Ruddington	Conservative	R. Dickson	1,920
Rufford	Labour	M. Gray	2,965
Selston	Labour	R. Kirk	2,640
Southwell	Conservative	B. Haigh	3,323
Stapleford North & West	Labour	G. Miller	2,494
Sutton-in-Ashfield Central	Labour	W. Shaw	2,173
Sutton-in-Ashfield East	Labour	J. Varley	1,911
Sutton-in-Ashfield North	Labour	J. Anthony	2,161
Sutton-in-Ashfield West	Labour	M. Lee	2,253
Toton & Attenborough	Conservative	G. Bottomely	1,824
Tuxford	Conservative	W. Pringle	2,338
Warsop	Labour	F. Taylor	2,783
West Bridgford East	Conservative	F. Woodward	2,122
West Bridgford South	Conservative	P. Wright	2,250
West Bridgford West	Conservative	B. Fairs	2,037
Worksop East	Labour	F. Groves	2,105
Worksop North & Carlton	Labour	A. Burton	2,189
Worksop South East & Welbeck	Labour	W. Bloomer	2,245
Worksop West	Labour	G. Williams	2,208
