= 2001 Nottinghamshire County Council election =

- 7 June 2001

All 63 seats to Nottinghamshire County Council 32 seats needed for a majority
- Turnout: 60.5%
	First party	Second party	Third party
Party	Labour	Conservative	Liberal Democrats
Seats before	42	17	4
Seats won	40	20	3
Seat change	▼2	▲3	▼1
Popular vote	155,587	127,039	51,647
Percentage	44.2%	36.1%	14.7%
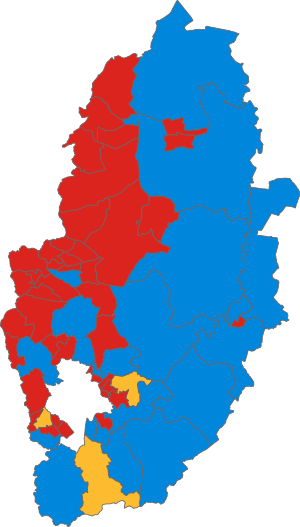
- Map of the results of the election in each division. Colours denote the winning party, as shown in the main table of results.
Council control before election
Labour
Council control after election
Labour

The 2001 Nottinghamshire County Council election was held on Thursday, 7 June 2001. The whole council was up for election and the result was the Labour Party retaining its control of the council.

== Election results ==
Political composition of the council following the election

Overall Turnout
Registered electors	581,836
Votes cast	352,237
Turnout	60.5%

2001 Nottinghamshire County Council election
Party	Candidates	Seats	Gains	Losses	Net gain/loss	Seats %	Votes %	Votes	+/−
Labour	63	40					44.2	155,587	
Conservative	63	20					36.1	127,039	
Liberal Democrats	41	3					14.7	51,647	
Independent	16	0					3.8	13,252	
Green	12	0					1.2	4,328	
Socialist Alliance	1	0					0.1	262	
BNP	1	0					0.1	122	

== Results by electoral division ==
=== Ashfield ===
(9 seats, 9 electoral divisions)

Ashfield District
Party	Candidates						Votes		
Party	Stood	Elected	Gained	Unseated	Net	% of total	%	No.	Net %
Labour	9	9	0	0	Steady		57.8	26,706	
Conservative	9	0	0	0	Steady		27.6	12,771	
Independent	5	0	0	0	Steady		11.0	5,097	
Green	3	0	0	0	Steady		2.8	1,284	
Socialist Alliance	1	0	0	0	Steady		0.6	262	
BNP	1	0	0	0	Steady		0.3	122	

Ashfield Turnout
Registered electors	86,806
Votes cast	46,242
Turnout	53.3%

==== Hucknall East ====
Hucknall East
Party	Candidate	Votes	%	±%
Labour	Chris Baron	3,080	56.4	
Conservative	M Spencer	1,332	24.4	
Independent	R Gow	1,052	19.3	
Turnout		5,464	54.7	
Registered electors		9,995		

==== Hucknall West ====
Hucknall West
Party	Candidate	Votes	%	±%
Labour	Nellie Smedley	4,902	64.6	
Conservative	S Robbins	2,686	35.4	
Turnout		7,588	56.9	
Registered electors		13,327		

==== Kirkby in Ashfield North ====
Kirkby in Ashfield North
Party	Candidate	Votes	%	±%
Labour	Richard Needham	2,787	54.0	
Independent	Robert Hook	1,025	19.9	
Conservative	Sylvia Baker	1,001	19.4	
Green	Justin Smith	350	6.8	
Turnout		5,163	49.5	
Registered electors		10,424		

==== Kirkby in Ashfield South ====
Kirkby in Ashfield South
Party	Candidate	Votes	%	±%
Labour	Yvonne Davidson	2,665	46.4	
Conservative	A Hobson	1,829	31.8	
Independent	N Woolley	640	11.1	
Green	M Harrison	615	10.7	
Turnout		5,749	55.6	
Registered electors		10,340		

==== Selston ====
Selston
Party	Candidate	Votes	%	±%
Labour	Joan Taylor	2,579	48.5	
Independent	Gail Turner	1,502	28.2	
Conservative	Roma Cox	1,242	23.3	
Turnout		5,323	54.5	
Registered electors		9,769		

==== Sutton in Ashfield Central ====
Sutton in Ashfield Central
Party	Candidate	Votes	%	±%
Labour	Edward Llewellyn-Jones	2,341	56.7	
Independent	W Shaw	878	21.3	
Conservative	T Chandran	787	19.1	
BNP	A Johnson	122	3.0	
Turnout		4,128	49.8	
Registered electors		8,295		

==== Sutton in Ashfield East ====
Sutton in Ashfield East
Party	Candidate	Votes	%	±%
Labour	Steve Carroll	2,760	73.3	
Conservative	Eugene Di Villa	1,005	26.7	
Turnout		3,765	49.9	
Registered electors		7,543		

==== Sutton in Ashfield North ====
Sutton in Ashfield North
Party	Candidate	Votes	%	±%
Labour	Dick Anthony	2,553	57.7	
Conservative	John Baker	1,291	29.2	
Green	Daniela Perschke	319	7.2	
Socialist Alliance	Jeffrey Tucker	262	5.9	
Turnout		4,425	53.3	
Registered electors		8,296		

==== Sutton in Ashfield West ====
Sutton in Ashfield West
Party	Candidate	Votes	%	±%
Labour	David Kirkham	3,039	65.5	
Conservative	Christine Vernon	1,598	34.5	
Turnout		4,637	52.6	
Registered electors		8,817		

=== Bassetlaw ===
(9 seats, 9 electoral divisions)

Bassetlaw District
Party	Candidates						Votes		
Party	Stood	Elected	Gained	Unseated	Net	% of total	%	No.	Net %
Labour	9	7	0	0	Steady		50.0	23,671	
Conservative	9	2	0	0	Steady		38.6	18,292	
Liberal Democrats	4	0	0	0	Steady		9.7	4,588	
Independent	1	0	0	0	Steady		1.0	470	
Green	1	0	0	0	Steady		0.7	309	

Bassetlaw Turnout
Registered electors	81,562
Votes cast	47,330
Turnout	58.0%

==== Blyth & Harworth ====
Blyth & Harworth
Party	Candidate	Votes	%	±%
Labour	Sheila Place	3,361	71.8	
Conservative	J Rickells	1,318	28.2	
Turnout		4,679	52.3	
Registered electors		8,949		

==== Misterton ====
Misterton
Party	Candidate	Votes	%	±%
Conservative	Kenneth Bullivant	3,376	51.9	
Liberal Democrats	Sean Kerrigan	1,714	26.3	
Labour	Laurence West	1,109	17.0	
Green	Paul Thorpe	309	4.7	
Turnout		6,508	64.1	
Registered electors		10,145		

==== Retford North ====
Retford North
Party	Candidate	Votes	%	±%
Labour	James Napier	2,187	41.1	
Conservative	Jean Bush	2,054	38.6	
Liberal Democrats	Graham Read	1,082	20.3	
Turnout		5,323	64.4	
Registered electors		8,264		

==== Retford South ====
Retford South
Party	Candidate	Votes	%	±%
Labour	Mick Storey	2,455	51.5	
Conservative	James Holland	1,542	32.4	
Liberal Democrats	John Bragger	766	16.1	
Turnout		4,763	58.8	
Registered electors		8,097		

==== Tuxford ====
Tuxford
Party	Candidate	Votes	%	±%
Conservative	John Hempsall	3,153	52.6	
Labour	J Shephard	1,818	30.3	
Liberal Democrats	P Horton	1,026	17.1	
Turnout		5,997	65.3	
Registered electors		9,189		

==== Worksop East ====
Worksop East
Party	Candidate	Votes	%	±%
Labour	Glynn Gilfoyle	3,661	67.3	
Conservative	John Ogle	1,782	32.7	
Turnout		5,443	56.0	
Registered electors		9,727		

==== Worksop North & Carlton ====
Worksop North & Carlton
Party	Candidate	Votes	%	±%
Labour	Roy Barsley	3,627	62.9	
Conservative	D Hare	2,137	37.1	
Turnout		5,764	56.4	
Registered electors		10,211		

==== Worksop South East & Welbeck ====
Worksop South East & Welbeck
Party	Candidate	Votes	%	±%
Labour	Vicki Smailes	1,844	62.1	
Conservative	A Dibb	655	22.1	
Independent	B Malacrida	470	15.8	
Turnout		2,969	51.4	
Registered electors		5,775		

==== Worksop West ====
Worksop West
Party	Candidate	Votes	%	±%
Labour	Alan Davison	3,609	61.3	
Conservative	J Smith	2,275	38.7	
Turnout		5,884	52.5	
Registered electors		11,205		

=== Broxtowe ===
(9 seats, 9 electoral divisions)

Broxtowe District
Party	Candidates						Votes		
Party	Stood	Elected	Gained	Unseated	Net	% of total	%	No.	Net %
Labour	9	6					40.8	22,352	
Conservative	9	2					33.4	18,281	
Liberal Democrats	9	1					22.8	12,516	
Green	3	0	0	0	Steady		2.0	1,082	
Independent	1	0	0	0	Steady		1.0	546	

Broxtowe Turnout
Registered electors	84,576
Votes cast	54,777
Turnout	64.8%

==== Beeston North ====
Beeston North
Party	Candidate	Votes	%	±%
Labour	Maureen Tewson	1,888	41.1	
Conservative	Joan Moodie	1,337	29.1	
Liberal Democrats	Stephen Carr	1,113	24.2	
Green	Sylvia Rule	259	5.6	
Turnout		4,597	63.2	
Registered electors		7,270		

==== Beeston South ====
Beeston South
Party	Candidate	Votes	%	±%
Labour	Michael Warner	2,524	48.1	
Conservative	Daniel Walton	1,360	25.9	
Liberal Democrats	Paul Fox	840	16.0	
Green	Paul Anderson	524	10.0	
Turnout		5,248	61.2	
Registered electors		8,581		

==== Bramcote & Stapleford East ====
Bramcote and Stapleford East
Party	Candidate	Votes	%	±%
Liberal Democrats	Stan Heptinstall	2,988	46.6	
Conservative	A Ford	1,939	30.2	
Labour	P Lally	1,491	23.2	
Turnout		6,418	71.5	
Registered electors		8,973		

==== Chilwell ====
Chilwell
Party	Candidate	Votes	%	±%
Labour	Gordon Skinner	2,655	42.8	
Conservative	Richard Jackson	2,320	37.4	
Liberal Democrats	Jacqueline Williams	931	15.0	
Green	Richard Eddleston	299	4.8	
Turnout		6,205	69.1	
Registered electors		8,985		

==== Eastwood & Brinsley ====
Eastwood and Brinsley
Party	Candidate	Votes	%	±%
Labour	Eleanor Lodziak	3,266	55.3	
Conservative	M Brown	1,720	29.1	
Liberal Democrats	R Charlesworth	919	15.6	
Turnout		5,905	56.1	
Registered electors		10,526		

==== Greasley & Nuthall ====
Greasley and Nuthall
Party	Candidate	Votes	%	±%
Conservative	David Taylor	3,726	42.5	
Labour	D Hedderly	3,542	40.4	
Liberal Democrats	P Ogden	954	10.9	
Independent	G Green	546	6.2	
Turnout		8,768	65.8	
Registered electors		13,331		

==== Kimberley & Trowell ====
Kimberley and Trowell
Party	Candidate	Votes	%	±%
Labour	Richard Robinson	2,287	38.1	
Liberal Democrats	Ken Rigby	2,131	35.5	
Conservative	L Ball	1,589	26.5	
Turnout		6,007	65.1	
Registered electors		9,229		

==== Stapleford North & West ====
Stapleford North & West
Party	Candidate	Votes	%	±%
Labour	John Bell	2,364	45.6	
Liberal Democrats	M Rich	1,720	33.2	
Conservative	S Bell	1,096	21.2	
Turnout		5,180	60.7	
Registered electors		8,528		

==== Toton & Attenborough ====
Toton and Attenborough
Party	Candidate	Votes	%	±%
Conservative	Tom Pettengell	3,194	49.5	
Labour	F Prince	2,335	36.2	
Liberal Democrats	C Wombwell	920	14.3	
Turnout		6,449	70.5	
Registered electors		9,153		

=== Gedling ===
(9 seats, 9 electoral divisions)

Gedling District
Party	Candidates						Votes		
Party	Stood	Elected	Gained	Unseated	Net	% of total	%	No.	Net %
Labour	9	5					42.9	23,499	
Conservative	9	3					39.6	21,687	
Liberal Democrats	7	1					13.4	7,359	
Independent	2	0	0	0	Steady		3.1	1,676	
Green	2	0	0	0	Steady		0.9	507	

Gedling Turnout
Registered electors	86,824
Votes cast	54,728
Turnout	63.0%

==== Arnold Central ====
Arnold Central
Party	Candidate	Votes	%	±%
Conservative	Rod Kempster	2,669	48.7	
Labour	Paul Feeney	2,249	41.1	
Liberal Democrats	Christopher Pratt	560	10.2	
Turnout		5,478	65.3	
Registered electors		8,393		

==== Arnold East ====
Arnold East
Party	Candidate	Votes	%	±%
Conservative	Veronica Pepper	2,778	42.3	
Labour	Barrie Bowker	2,519	38.3	
Liberal Democrats	Janice Lambert	697	10.6	
Independent	Don Stickland	337	5.1	
Green	Henry Wheeler	238	3.6	
Turnout		6,569	64.2	
Registered electors		10,237		

==== Arnold West ====
Arnold West
Party	Candidate	Votes	%	±%
Labour	James Woodward	2,014	42.0	
Conservative	Melvyn Shepherd	1,959	40.8	
Liberal Democrats	Andrew Swift	826	17.2	
Turnout		4,799	65.3	
Registered electors		7,345		

==== Calverton ====
Calverton
Party	Candidate	Votes	%	±%
Labour	John Stocks	3,294	49.6	
Conservative	Graham Kilbourne	2,005	30.2	
Independent	Grant Withers	1,339	20.2	
Turnout		6,638	63.6	
Registered electors		10,444		

==== Carlton Central ====
Carlton Central
Party	Candidate	Votes	%	±%
Labour	Christopher Preston	2,725	49.5	
Conservative	Eric Collin	1,927	35.0	
Liberal Democrats	Anthony Gillam	848	15.4	
Turnout		5,500	61.5	
Registered electors		8,943		

==== Carlton East ====
Carlton East
Party	Candidate	Votes	%	±%
Liberal Democrats	Raymond Poynter	2,815	43.3	
Conservative	Alan Bexon	2,206	33.9	
Labour	Jim Creamer	1,480	22.8	
Turnout		6,501	67.5	
Registered electors		9,638		

==== Carlton South ====
Carlton South
Party	Candidate	Votes	%	±%
Labour	John Clarke	3,644	49.7	
Conservative	Richard Robinson	2,525	34.4	
Liberal Democrats	Andrew Dunkin	901	12.3	
Green	Jean Katimertzis	269	3.7	
Turnout		7,339	57.2	
Registered electors		12,837		

==== Carlton West ====
Carlton West
Party	Candidate	Votes	%	±%
Labour	Darrell Pulk	2,794	49.5	
Conservative	G Clarke	2,137	37.9	
Liberal Democrats	P Hughes	712	12.6	
Turnout		5,643	62.5	
Registered electors		9,031		

==== Newstead ====
Newstead
Party	Candidate	Votes	%	±%
Conservative	Joe Lonergan	3,481	55.6	
Labour	John Knight	2,780	44.4	
Turnout		6,261	62.9	
Registered electors		9,956		

=== Mansfield ===
(9 seats, 9 electoral divisions)

Mansfield District
Party	Candidates						Votes		
Party	Stood	Elected	Gained	Unseated	Net	% of total	%	No.	Net %
Labour	9	8					53.0	22,096	
Conservative	9	1					26.7	11,135	
Liberal Democrats	6	0					12.1	5,043	
Independent	3	0	0	0	Steady		5.4	2,268	
Green	3	0	0	0	Steady		2.7	1,146	

Mansfield Turnout
Registered electors	76,074
Votes cast	41,688
Turnout	54.8%

==== Cumberlands & Ladybrook ====
Cumberlands and Ladybrook
Party	Candidate	Votes	%	±%
Labour	Rita Sharpe	2,481	56.1	
Conservative	M Allen	767	17.3	
Independent	C Hallam	626	14.2	
Liberal Democrats	J Smith	550	12.4	
Turnout		4,424	51.6	
Registered electors		8,575		

==== Leeming & Forest Town ====
Leeming and Forest Town
Party	Candidate	Votes	%	±%
Labour	Parry Tsimbiridis	2,836	47.4	
Conservative	P Moss	1,647	27.6	
Liberal Democrats	D Rumley	1,182	19.8	
Green	M Comerford	313	5.2	
Turnout		5,978	55.1	
Registered electors		10,841		

==== Northfield & Manor ====
Northfield and Manor
Party	Candidate	Votes	%	±%
Labour	Reginald Strauther	2,470	55.7	
Conservative	K Ball	1,116	25.1	
Liberal Democrats	J Smith	852	19.2	
Turnout		4,438	54.4	
Registered electors		8,163		

==== Oak Tree & Lindhurst ====
Oak Tree and Lindhurst
Party	Candidate	Votes	%	±%
Labour	Terence Butler	1,948	49.1	
Conservative	K Rees	1,090	27.5	
Liberal Democrats	M Knight	656	16.5	
Green	J Frost	274	6.9	
Turnout		3,968	55.6	
Registered electors		7,138		

==== Oakham & Berry Hill ====
Oakham and Berry Hill
Party	Candidate	Votes	%	±%
Conservative	Kathryn Allsop	2,738	47.2	
Labour	B Mason	1,913	33.0	
Liberal Democrats	M Leal	1,146	19.8	
Turnout		5,797	63.3	
Registered electors		9,161		

==== Pleasley Hill & Broomhill ====
Pleasley Hill and Broomhill
Party	Candidate	Votes	%	±%
Labour	John Carter	2,147	56.1	
Independent	M Button	1,055	27.5	
Conservative	B Freeman	628	16.4	
Turnout		3,830	54.6	
Registered electors		7,018		

==== Ravensdale & Sherwood ====
Ravensdale and Sherwood
Party	Candidate	Votes	%	±%
Labour	Joyce Bosnjak	2,134	49.1	
Conservative	N Bradshaw	972	22.3	
Liberal Democrats	P Smith	657	15.1	
Independent	C Smith	587	13.5	
Turnout		4,350	50.7	
Registered electors		8,582		

==== Titchfield & Eakring ====
Titchfield and Eakring
Party	Candidate	Votes	%	±%
Labour	Chris Winterton	2,257	60.9	
Conservative	D Hatton	892	24.1	
Green	M J Jackson	559	15.1	
Turnout		3,708	50.2	
Registered electors		7,383		

==== Warsop ====
Warsop
Party	Candidate	Votes	%	±%
Labour	Brian Smith	3,910	75.3	
Conservative	K Allsop	1,285	24.7	
Turnout		5,195	56.4	
Registered electors		9,213		

=== Newark and Sherwood ===
(9 seats, 9 electoral divisions)

Newark and Sherwood District
Party	Candidates						Votes		
Party	Stood	Elected	Gained	Unseated	Net	% of total	%	No.	Net %
Conservative	9	5					39.0	20,514	
Labour	9	4					37.8	19,904	
Liberal Democrats	6	0					17.1	8,979	
Independent	4	0	0	0	Steady		6.1	3,195	

Newark and Sherwood Turnout
Registered electors	83,670
Votes cast	52,592
Turnout	62.9%

==== Balderton ====
Balderton
Party	Candidate	Votes	%	±%
Conservative	Keith Walker	3,042	43.4	
Labour	A Hannaford	2,249	32.1	
Liberal Democrats	N Allen	976	13.9	
Independent	D Logue	744	10.6	
Turnout		7,011	63.2	
Registered electors		11,087		

==== Blidworth ====
Blidworth
Party	Candidate	Votes	%	±%
Labour	Yvonne Woodhead	2,357	58.9	
Independent	Geoff Merry	899	22.5	
Conservative	Neil Dean	743	18.6	
Turnout		3,999	55.3	
Registered electors		7,233		

==== Caunton ====
Caunton
Party	Candidate	Votes	%	±%
Conservative	Bruce Laughton	3,225	42.0	
Liberal Democrats	Brendan Haigh	2,714	35.4	
Labour	David Bates	1,731	22.6	
Turnout		7,670	70.6	
Registered electors		10,868		

==== Collingham ====
Collingham
Party	Candidate	Votes	%	±%
Conservative	Vincent Dobson	3,337	53.5	
Labour	Desmond Whicher	1,606	25.7	
Liberal Democrats	Marylyn Rayner	1,294	20.7	
Turnout		6,237	67.3	
Registered electors		9,266		

==== Newark North ====
Newark North
Party	Candidate	Votes	%	±%
Conservative	Peter Prebble	2,087	38.8	
Labour	Victor Hall	2,040	37.9	
Liberal Democrats	Gillian Dawn	1,252	23.3	
Turnout		5,379	56.0	
Registered electors		9,599		

==== Newark South ====
Newark South
Party	Candidate	Votes	%	±%
Labour	Colin Bromfield	1,857	55.5	
Conservative	Ann Marshall	1,101	32.9	
Liberal Democrats	Francis Higson	388	11.6	
Turnout		3,346	52.8	
Registered electors		6,337		

==== Ollerton ====
Ollerton
Party	Candidate	Votes	%	±%
Labour	Stella Smedley	3,739	71.1	
Conservative	Brian Jarvis	1,522	28.9	
Turnout		5,261	56.7	
Registered electors		9,275		

==== Rufford ====
Rufford
Party	Candidate	Votes	%	±%
Labour	Andrew Freeman	2,673	52.3	
Conservative	Mary Brown	1,347	26.4	
Independent	Samuel Dunlop	1,088	21.3	
Turnout		5,108	60.9	
Registered electors		8,381		

==== Southwell ====
Southwell
Party	Candidate	Votes	%	±%
Conservative	Samuel Stuart	4,110	47.9	
Liberal Democrats	John Baker	2,355	27.4	
Labour	Neil Fawkes	1,652	19.3	
Independent	Timothy Cutler	464	5.4	
Turnout		8,581	73.8	
Registered electors		11,624		

=== Rushcliffe ===
(9 seats, 9 electoral divisions)

Rushcliffe District
Party	Candidates						Votes		
Party	Stood	Elected	Gained	Unseated	Net	% of total	%	No.	Net %
Conservative	9	7					44.4	24,359	
Labour	9	1					31.6	17,359	
Liberal Democrats	9	1					24.0	13,162	

Rushcliffe Turnout
Registered electors	82,324
Votes cast	54,880
Turnout	66.7%

==== Bingham ====
Bingham
Party	Candidate	Votes	%	±%
Conservative	Martin Suthers	3,409	45.0	
Liberal Democrats	George Davidson	2,096	27.7	
Labour	Avril Bear	2,072	27.3	
Turnout		7,577	66.6	
Registered electors		11,376		

==== Cotgrave ====
Cotgrave
Party	Candidate	Votes	%	±%
Conservative	Richard Butler	2,790	44.1	
Labour	P Morrissey	2,507	39.6	
Liberal Democrats	S Hull	1,036	16.4	
Turnout		6,333	64.5	
Registered electors		9,816		

==== East Leake ====
East Leake
Party	Candidate	Votes	%	±%
Conservative	Kenneth O'Toole	2,771	47.1	
Labour	Paul Jacques	2,132	36.2	
Liberal Democrats	Daphne Butler	984	16.7	
Turnout		5,887	66.4	
Registered electors		8,870		

==== Keyworth ====
Keyworth
Party	Candidate	Votes	%	±%
Conservative	John Cottee	2,852	48.5	
Liberal Democrats	Samuel Boote	2,227	37.9	
Labour	Penelope Oldridge	797	13.6	
Turnout		5,876	71.7	
Registered electors		8,192		

==== Radcliffe on Trent ====
Radcliffe on Trent
Party	Candidate	Votes	%	±%
Conservative	Kay Cutts	2,492	51.9	
Labour	E Gamble	1,459	30.4	
Liberal Democrats	D Allen	853	17.8	
Turnout		4,804	66.3	
Registered electors		7,250		

==== Ruddington ====
Ruddington
Party	Candidate	Votes	%	±%
Liberal Democrats	Susan Bennett	2,086	41.2	
Conservative	Reg Adair	2,083	41.2	
Labour	A Clayworth	889	17.6	
Turnout		5,058	69.7	
Registered electors		7,259		

==== West Bridgford East ====
West Bridgford East
Party	Candidate	Votes	%	±%
Labour	Graham Jackson	3,116	46.8	
Conservative	Timothy Spencer	2,333	35.0	
Liberal Democrats	Christopher Evans	1,215	18.2	
Turnout		6,664	66.4	
Registered electors		10,029		

==== West Bridgford South ====
West Bridgford South
Party	Candidate	Votes	%	±%
Conservative	Michael Cox	2,742	47.4	
Labour	Gillian Aldridge	1,748	30.2	
Liberal Democrats	Lawrence Porter	1,297	22.4	
Turnout		5,787	68.1	
Registered electors		8,504		

==== West Bridgford West ====
West Bridgford West
Party	Candidate	Votes	%	±%
Conservative	Martin Brandon-Bravo	2,887	41.9	
Labour	A MacInnes	2,639	38.3	
Liberal Democrats	J Banks	1,368	19.8	
Turnout		6,894	62.5	
Registered electors		11,028		
