= 1973 Nottinghamshire County Council election =

1973 UK local government election

- 12 April 1973

All 89 seats to Nottinghamshire County Council 45 seats needed for a majority
- Turnout: 39.4%
	First party	Second party
Party	Labour	Conservative
Seats won	54	35
Popular vote	121,230	113,977
Percentage	49.1%	46.1%
- Map of the results of the election in each division. Colours denote the winning party, as shown in the main table of results.
Council control after election
Labour

The 1973 Nottinghamshire County Council election was held on Thursday, 12 April 1973. The election resulted in the Labour Party winning an overall majority of seats on the council.

The election was the first held for the new non-metropolitan county council of Nottinghamshire, created under the Local Government Act 1972 as part of the reorganisation of local government in England and Wales. The new council initially operated as a shadow authority before formally taking over on 1 April 1974 from the previous county council, which had been established under the Local Government Act 1888.

The reorganisation brought the independent county borough of Nottingham into the administrative county of Nottinghamshire for the first time. It later regained independent local government status in 1998, when it became a unitary authority.

== Results by division ==
Each electoral division returned either one, two or three county councillors.

=== Ashfield ===
==== Basford No. 4 (Selston) ====
Basford No. 4 (Selston)
Party	Candidate	Votes	%	±%
Labour	Beatrice Sharrard	Unopposed		
Turnout		N/A	N/A	N/A

==== Hucknall East ====
Hucknall East
Party	Candidate	Votes	%	±%
Labour	Bernard Simms	2,362	71.5	
Conservative	J. Corden	940	28.5	
Turnout		3,302	39.8	
Registered electors		8,291		

==== Hucknall North ====
Hucknall North
Party	Candidate	Votes	%	±%
Labour	Phyllis Watson	2,757	55.3	
Conservative	C. Morley	2,227	44.7	
Turnout		4,984	44.0%	
Registered electors		11,340		

==== Kirkby in Ashfield East ====
Kirkby in Ashfield East
Party	Candidate	Votes	%	±%
Labour	Sylvia Booler	Unopposed		
Turnout		N/A	N/A	N/A

==== Kirkby in Ashfield West ====
Kirkby in Ashfield West
Party	Candidate	Votes	%	±%
Labour	Edward Ashley	Unopposed		
Turnout		N/A	N/A	N/A

==== Sutton in Ashfield East ====
Sutton in Ashfield East
Party	Candidate	Votes	%	±%
Labour	Arthur Bennett	Unopposed		
Turnout		N/A	N/A	N/A

==== Sutton in Ashfield North ====
Sutton in Ashfield North
Party	Candidate	Votes	%	±%
Labour	Dick Anthony	1,114	62.8	
Independent	W. Wright	661	37.2	
Turnout		1,775	25.3	
Registered electors		7,011		

==== Sutton in Ashfield South ====
Sutton in Ashfield South
Party	Candidate	Votes	%	±%
Labour	Ewart Lincoln	1,521	71.2	
Independent	K. Holland	616	28.8	
Turnout		2,137	23.2	
Registered electors		9,203		

==== Sutton in Ashfield West ====
Sutton in Ashfield West
Party	Candidate	Votes	%	±%
Labour	Malcolm Lee	1,249	75.7	
Independent	W. Gascoyne	400	24.3	
Turnout		1,649	28.4	
Registered electors		5,810		

=== Bassetlaw ===
==== East Retford Rural No. 1 (Tuxford) ====
East Retford Rural No. 1 (Tuxford)
Party	Candidate	Votes	%	±%
Conservative	Cecil Hempsall	1,805	65.5	
Labour	F. Byard	950	34.5	
Turnout		2,755	45.5	
Registered electors		6,051		

==== East Retford Rural No. 2 (Misterton) ====
East Retford Rural No. 2 (Misterton)
Party	Candidate	Votes	%	±%
Conservative	Fred Rudder	2,644	56.9	
Labour	R. Baddiley	2,004	43.1	
Turnout		4,648	46.6	
Registered electors		9,982		

==== Retford North ====
Retford North
Party	Candidate	Votes	%	±%
Labour	Ernest Davidson	1,413	54.5	
Conservative	I. Dixon	1,178	45.5	
Turnout		2,591	39.6	
Registered electors		6,548		

==== Retford South ====
Retford South
Party	Candidate	Votes	%	±%
Labour	Clifford Grove	1,500	52.9	
Conservative	R. Alexander	1,338	47.1	
Turnout		2,838	40.4	
Registered electors		7,017		

==== Worksop No. 1 (East) ====
Worksop No. 1 (East)
Party	Candidate	Votes	%	±%
Labour	Reginald Rabbitt	2,843	67.8	
Conservative	F. Toop	1,350	32.2	
Turnout		4,193	36.8	
Registered electors		11,406		

==== Worksop No. 2 (North) ====
Worksop No. 2 (North)
Party	Candidate	Votes	%	±%
Labour	Alfred Burton	Unopposed		
Turnout		N/A	N/A	N/A

==== Worksop No. 3 (South) ====
Worksop No. 3 (South)
Party	Candidate	Votes	%	±%
Labour	Peter Miller	1,638	54.1	
Conservative	J. Turner	1,387	45.9	
Turnout		3,025	37.9	
Registered electors		7,990		

==== Worksop Rural No. 1 (Blyth) ====
Worksop Rural No. 1 (Blyth)
Party	Candidate	Votes	%	±%
Labour	James Connolly	1,354	41.3	
Independent	C. Dodd	1,151	35.1	
Conservative	S. Brown	773	23.6	
Turnout		3,278	47.3	
Registered electors		6,923		

==== Worksop Rural No. 2 (Harworth) ====
Worksop Rural No. 2 (Harworth)
Party	Candidate	Votes	%	±%
Labour	Charles Stringer	Unopposed		
Turnout		N/A	N/A	N/A

=== Broxtowe ===
==== Basford No. 1 (Newthorpe) ====
Basford No. 1 (Newthorpe)
Party	Candidate	Votes	%	±%
Conservative	Caroline Minkley	2,656	50.4	
Labour	E. Carter	2,619	49.6	
Turnout		5,275	50.1	
Registered electors		10,535		

==== Basford No. 2 (Kimberley) ====
Basford No. 2 (Kimberley)
Party	Candidate	Votes	%	±%
Labour	Anthony Rutherford	2,139	59.5	
Independent	B. Clarke	1,457	40.5	
Turnout		3,596	48.2	
Registered electors		7,453		

==== Beeston & Stapleford (Bramcote) ====
Beeston & Stapleford (Bramcote)
Party	Candidate	Votes	%	±%
Conservative	Cyril Cooper	2,343	57.4	
Labour	T. Martin	1,737	42.6	
Turnout		4,080	50.1	
Registered electors		8,149		

==== Beeston & Stapleford (Chilwell) ====
Beeston & Stapleford (Chilwell)
Party	Candidate	Votes	%	±%
Conservative	Ray Hudson	2,408	54.1	
Labour	V. Bell	2,043	45.9	
Turnout		4,451	50.7	
Registered electors		8,772		

==== Beeston & Stapleford (Beeston North) ====
Beeston & Stapleford (Beeston North)
Party	Candidate	Votes	%	±%
Conservative	Robert Cox	1,784	54.7	
Labour	G. Watson	1,478	45.3	
Turnout		3,262	47.5	
Registered electors		6,867		

==== Beeston & Stapleford (Beeston South) ====
Beeston & Stapleford (Beeston South)
Party	Candidate	Votes	%	±%
Labour	David Orton	2,273	57.6	
Conservative	M. Wright	1,671	42.4	
Turnout		3,944	47.6	
Registered electors		8,284		

==== Beeston & Stapleford (Stapleford) ====
Beeston & Stapleford (Stapleford)
Party	Candidate	Votes	%	±%
Labour	William Plowman	2,421	59.4	
Conservative	F. Woodward	1,655	40.6	
Turnout		4,076	46.1	
Registered electors		8,833		

==== Beeston & Stapleford (Toton and Attenborough) ====
Beeston & Stapleford (Toton and Attenborough)
Party	Candidate	Votes	%	±%
Conservative	Gertrude Bottomley	1,914	60.2	
Labour	A. Kent	1,268	39.8	
Turnout		3,182	46.7	
Registered electors		6,819		

==== Eastwood ====
Eastwood
Party	Candidate	Votes	%	±%
Labour	Harry Walker	1,412	47.6	
Conservative	H. Elliott	878	29.6	
Independent	H. Roberts	678	22.8	
Turnout		2,968	37.8	
Registered electors		7,852		

=== Gedling ===
==== Arnold East ====
Arnold East
Party	Candidate	Votes	%	±%
Labour	Ernest Lester	2,078	51.8	
Conservative	J. Clarke	1,932	48.2	
Turnout		4,010	45.3	
Registered electors		8,851		

==== Arnold South ====
Arnold South
Party	Candidate	Votes	%	±%
Conservative	James Lester	2,924	73.0	
Labour	T. Price	1,080	27.0	
Turnout		4,004	41.3	
Registered electors		9,684		

==== Arnold West ====
Arnold West
Party	Candidate	Votes	%	±%
Conservative	Ronald Griffin	1,853	55.1	
Labour	George Cornes	1,512	44.9	
Turnout		3,365	51.4	
Registered electors		6,549		

==== Basford No. 6 (Calverton) ====
Basford No. 6 (Calverton)
Party	Candidate	Votes	%	±%
Conservative	John Sheldon	3,424	54.4	
Conservative	George Ayton	3,283	52.2	
Labour	W. Crewe	2,943	46.8	
Labour	G. Reader	2,939	46.7	
Turnout		6,294	48.9	
Registered electors		12,862		

==== Carlton No. 1 ====
Carlton No. 1
Party	Candidate	Votes	%	±%
Conservative	Alfred Roth	4,095	59.4	
Conservative	William Edwards	4,033	58.5	
Labour	H. Ball	2,908	42.2	
Labour	Fay Reilly	2,757	40.0	
Turnout		6,896	42.5	
Registered electors		16,218		

==== Carlton No. 2 ====
Carlton No. 2 (2)
Party	Candidate	Votes	%	±%
Conservative	Ronald Stanley	3,706	50.1	
Conservative	Daniel Shirt	3,705		
Labour	A. Palmer	3,701	49.9	
Labour	K. Fleet	3,358		

=== Mansfield ===
==== Mansfield No. 1 (East) ====
Mansfield No. 1 (East)
Party	Candidate	Votes	%	±%
Labour	Frank Warsop	1,220	62.5	
Conservative	T. Martin	669	34.3	
Communist	S. Hackett	63	3.2	
Turnout		1,952	33.8	
Registered electors		5,782		

==== Mansfield No. 2 (South East) ====
Mansfield No. 2 (South East)
Party	Candidate	Votes	%	±%
Labour	Gordon Foster	1,725	61.3	
Conservative	Patricia Caley	1,090	38.7	
Turnout		2,815	33.1	
Registered electors		8,515		

==== Mansfield No. 3 (South) ====
Mansfield No. 3 (South)
Party	Candidate	Votes	%	±%
Conservative	William Brown	2,200	58.3	
Labour	M. Morley	1,576	41.7	
Turnout		3,776	37.1	
Registered electors		10,187		

==== Mansfield No. 4 (North & North East) ====
Mansfield No. 4 (North & North East)
Party	Candidate	Votes	%	±%
Labour	William Morris	3,702	89.2	
Labour	M. Gallagher	3,632		
Communist	I. Hackett	447	10.8	
Turnout		7,781	42.6	
Registered electors		18,279		

==== Mansfield Woodhouse ====
Mansfield Woodhouse
Party	Candidate	Votes	%	±%
Labour	Frank Haynes	Unopposed		
Labour	Bertie Whitelaw	Unopposed		
Turnout		N/A	N/A	N/A

==== Warsop ====
Warsop
Party	Candidate	Votes	%	±%
Labour	William Cairns	Unopposed		
Turnout		N/A	N/A	N/A

=== Newark and Sherwood ===
==== Balderton ====
Balderton
Party	Candidate	Votes	%	±%
Conservative	Robert Jenkins	1,829	51.5	
Labour	D. Essex	1,722	48.5	
Turnout		3,551	45.5	
Registered electors		7,805		

==== Collingham ====
Collingham
Party	Candidate	Votes	%	±%
Conservative	Edith Yates	1,504	78.9	
Labour	G. Davis	402	21.1	
Turnout		1,906	45.9	
Registered electors		4,149		

==== Newark No. 1 (South) ====
Newark No. 1 (South)
Party	Candidate	Votes	%	±%
Labour	John Moore	1,631	55.0	
Conservative	I. Smith	1,335	45.0	
Turnout		2,966	36.5	
Registered electors		8,119		

==== Newark No. 2 (North and East) ====
Newark No. 2 (North and East)
Party	Candidate	Votes	%	±%
Labour	Sean Woods	1,708	46.3	
Conservative	Vince Dobson	1,530	41.5	
Liberal	A. Boggie	450	12.2	
Turnout		3,688	38.3	
Registered electors		9,627		

==== Southwell No. 1 (Southwell) ====
Southwell No. 1 (Southwell)
Party	Candidate	Votes	%	±%
Conservative	Brendan Haigh	3,669	75.2	
Labour	P. Tempest	1,212	24.8	
Turnout		4,881	51.9	
Registered electors		9,397		

==== Southwell No. 2 (Norwell & Bilsthorpe) ====
Southwell No. 2 (Norwell & Bilsthorpe)
Party	Candidate	Votes	%	±%
Conservative	Peter Boddy	2,367	55.5	
Labour	H. Tuck	1,898	44.5	
Turnout		4,265	61.0	
Registered electors		6,996		

==== Southwell No. 3 (Ollerton) ====
Southwell No. 3 (Ollerton)
Party	Candidate	Votes	%	±%
Labour	Michael DeLacy	2,526	71.4	
Conservative	J. Methley	1,014	28.6	
Turnout		3,540	45.4	
Registered electors		7,802		

==== Southwell No. 4 (Blidworth) ====
Southwell No. 4 (Blidworth)
Party	Candidate	Votes	%	±%
Labour	Ernest Farr	3,062	64.1	
Conservative	J. Daniel	1,715	35.9	
Turnout		4,777	51.6	
Registered electors		9,258		

==== Southwell No. 5 (Rufford) ====
Southwell No. 5 (Rufford)
Party	Candidate	Votes	%	±%
Labour	Miriam Beardsley	Unopposed		
Turnout		N/A	N/A	N/A

=== City of Nottingham ===
==== Nottingham No. 1 (Bridge & Trent) ====
Nottingham No. 1 (Bridge & Trent)
Party	Candidate	Votes	%	±%
Labour	G. Daft	3,793	61.0	
Labour	Joan Fennell	3,690	59.3	
Labour	Colin Worthington	3,552	57.1	
Conservative	F. Johnson	2,705	43.5	
Conservative	J. Pearson	2,495	40.1	
Conservative	D. Brooke	2,427	39.0	
Turnout		6,220	25.4	
Registered electors		24,472		

==== Nottingham No. 2 (Lenton) ====
Nottingham No. 2 (Lenton)
Party	Candidate	Votes	%	±%
Labour	Mairi Yuill	2,327	51.1	
Conservative	Brenda Borrett	2,320	50.9	
Conservative	Martin Suthers	2,238	49.1	
Labour	T. Arnold	2,223	48.8	
Turnout		4,554	33.5	
Registered electors		13,614		

==== Nottingham No. 3 (Manvers & St. Ann's) ====
Nottingham No. 3 (Manvers & St. Ann's)
Party	Candidate	Votes	%	±%
Labour	Frank Higgin	2,239	56.7	
Labour	John Carroll	2,202	55.7	
Conservative	S. Rushton	1,738	44.0	
Conservative	R. Rolling	1,724	43.6	
Turnout		3,951	33.9	
Registered electors		11,648		

==== Nottingham No. 4 (Market) ====
Nottingham No. 4 (Market)
Party	Candidate	Votes	%	±%
Labour	James Cattermole	1,147	59.5	
Conservative	H. Whitehead	782	40.5	
Turnout		1,929	27.7	
Registered electors		6,966		

==== Nottingham No. 5 (Byron & St. Albans) ====
Nottingham No. 5 (Byron & St. Albans)
Party	Candidate	Votes	%	±%
Labour	Ivy Matthews	5,891	77.2	
Labour	John Scoffings	5,011	65.6	
Labour	Richard Wilson	4,991	65.4	
Conservative	W. Smith	2,004	26.3	
Conservative	R. Tressider	1,864	24.4	
Conservative	J. Lymbury	1,693	22.2	
Communist	John Peck	1,450	19.0	
Turnout		7,634	28.0	
Registered electors		27,240		

==== Nottingham No. 6 (Forest & Mapperley) ====
Nottingham No. 6 (Forest & Mapperley)
Party	Candidate	Votes	%	±%
Conservative	Henry Fraser	4,579	55.7	
Conservative	Ernest Chambers	4,463	54.3	
Conservative	Eric Baker	4,113	50.1	
Labour	E. Bullingham	2,216	27.0	
Labour	J. Rowland	2,184	26.6	
Labour	H. James	2,154	26.2	
Liberal	M. Whittaker	1,796	21.9	
Liberal	D. Sales	1,606	19.5	
Liberal	E. Rowan	1,537	18.7	
Turnout		8,216	32.8	
Registered electors		25,026		

==== Nottingham No. 7 (Portland & Radford) ====
Nottingham No. 7 (Portland & Radford)
Party	Candidate	Votes	%	±%
Labour	Jess Burton	4,505	59.4	
Labour	Leonard Maynard	4,491	59.2	
Labour	Thomas Strickson	4,221	55.6	
Conservative	H. Markson	3,271	43.1	
Conservative	D. Poole	3,161	41.7	
Conservative	D. Woodroffe	3,107	41.0	
Turnout		7,585	32.6	
Registered electors		23,283		

==== Nottingham No. 8 (Abbey & University) ====
Nottingham No. 8 (Abbey & University)
Party	Candidate	Votes	%	±%
Conservative	Gordon Cragg	6,152	64.6	
Conservative	Madge Whittaker	6,105	64.1	
Conservative	Michael Spungin	6,081	63.8	
Labour	F. Dennett	3,632	38.1	
Labour	D. Bush	3,380	35.5	
Labour	B. Kirk	3,228	33.9	
Turnout		9,526	37.5	
Registered electors		25,401		

==== Nottingham No. 9 (Clifton) ====
Nottingham No. 9 (Clifton)
Party	Candidate	Votes	%	±%
Labour	George Dobson	3,264	87.9	
Labour	Samuel Gibbons	2,807	75.6	
Conservative	N. Hapgood	735	19.8	
Conservative	B. Kirsch	621	16.7	
Turnout		3,713	26.9	
Registered electors		13,783		

==== Nottingham No. 10 (Robin Hood & Broxtowe) ====
Nottingham No. 10 (Robin Hood & Broxtowe)
Party	Candidate	Votes	%	±%
Labour	Eric Foster	4,451	62.8	
Labour	Joan Case	4,135	58.3	
Labour	T. Harby	3,991	56.3	
Independent	E. Walker	3,330	47.0	
Conservative	B. Marshall	1,914	27.0	
Conservative	P. Le Bosquet	1,743	24.6	
Conservative	S. Freeman	1,701	24.0	
Turnout		7,088	30.0	
Registered electors		23,640		

==== Nottingham No. 11 (Wollaton) ====
Nottingham No. 11 (Wollaton)
Party	Candidate	Votes	%	±%
Labour	Bert Littlewood	3,505	71.1	
Labour	Michael Cowan	2,864	58.1	
Conservative	A. Ellis	1,833	37.2	
Conservative	B. Vinerd	1,653	33.5	
Turnout		4,927	31.9	
Registered electors		15,444		

=== Rushcliffe ===
==== Basford No. 3 (East Leake & Gotham) ====
Basford No. 3 (East Leake & Gotham)
Party	Candidate	Votes	%	±%
Conservative	Ronald Strutt, 4th Baron Belper	1,821	43.5	
Labour	P. Jacques	1,540	36.8	
Liberal	J. Hamilton	827	19.7	
Turnout		4,188	60.1	
Registered electors		6,974		

==== Basford No. 5 (Ruddington) ====
Basford No. 5 (Ruddington)
Party	Candidate	Votes	%	±%
Conservative	Robert Dickson	2,278	68.2	
Labour	T. Bamfield	1,060	31.8	
Turnout		3,338	50.2	
Registered electors		6,653		

==== Bingham No. 1 (Bingham) ====
Bingham No. 1 (Bingham)
Party	Candidate	Votes	%	±%
Conservative	Gertrude Wade	2,629	71.4	
Labour	P. Thompson	1,055	28.6	
Turnout		3,684	52.0	
Registered electors		7,082		

==== Bingham No. 2 (Radcliffe) ====
Bingham No. 2 (Radcliffe)
Party	Candidate	Votes	%	±%
Conservative	Montague Appleby	1,926	64.1	
Labour	D. Butterworth	1,080	35.9	
Turnout		3,006	45.4	
Registered electors		6,620		

==== Bingham No. 3 (Cotgrave & Cropwell) ====
Bingham No. 3 (Cotgrave & Cropwell)
Party	Candidate	Votes	%	±%
Labour	Victor Lloyd	1,687	51.1	
Conservative	Anthony Shipstone	1,614	48.9	
Turnout		3,301	51.6	
Registered electors		6,395		

==== Bingham No. 4 (Keyworth) ====
Bingham No. 4 (Keyworth)
Party	Candidate	Votes	%	±%
Conservative	Stewart Pattinson	2,979	81.0	
Labour	E. Bullimore	697	19.0	
Turnout		3,676	48.4	
Registered electors		7,588		

==== West Bridgford North ====
West Bridgford North
Party	Candidate	Votes	%	±%
Conservative	Frank Worwood	1,542	67.4	
Labour	H. Robinson	747	32.6	
Turnout		2,289	39.7	
Registered electors		5,770		

==== West Bridgford South ====
West Bridgford South
Party	Candidate	Votes	%	±%
Conservative	Peter Wright	2,522	76.5	
Labour	L. Burch	776	23.5	
Turnout		3,298	47.1	
Registered electors		6,999		

==== West Bridgford West ====
West Bridgford West
Party	Candidate	Votes	%	±%
Conservative	Frank Whitson	2,826	75.5	
Labour	J. Dunford	917	24.5	
Turnout		3,743	38.8	
Registered electors		9,635		
