= 1989 Nottinghamshire County Council election =

1989 UK local government election

- 4 May 1989

All 88 seats to Nottinghamshire County Council 45 seats needed for a majority
	First party	Second party	Third party
Party	Labour	Conservative	SLD
Seats before	48	37	2
Seats won	50	34	4
Seat change	▲2	▼3	▲2
Popular vote	155,018	128,379	33,727
Percentage	47.09%	39.00%	10.25%
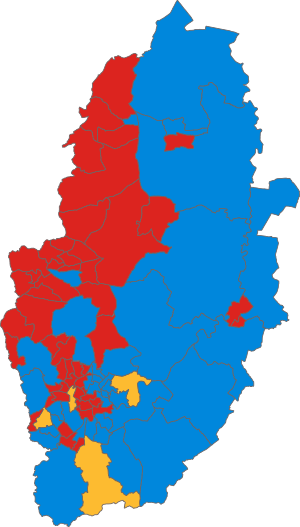
- Map of the results of the election in each division. Colours denote the winning party, as shown in the main table of results.
Council control before election
Labour
Council control after election
Labour

The 1989 Nottinghamshire County Council election was held on Thursday, 4 May 1989. The whole council of eighty-eight members was up for election and the result was that the Labour Party retained control of the Council, winning fifty seats. The Conservatives won thirty-four councillors and the Social and Liberal Democrats won four seats.

Minor boundary changes took place for this election, with the parish of Broadholme being transferred to Lincolnshire and the division of Newstead was enlarged by the addition of Ravenshead which had been transferred to Gedling from Newark and Sherwood in 1987.

== Results by division ==
Each electoral division returned one county councillor. The candidate elected to the council in each electoral division is shown in the table below.

Electoral Division	Party	Councillor	Votes
Arnold Central	Conservative	R. Griffin	2,313
Arnold East	Conservative	V. Pepper	2,402
Arnold West	Conservative	A. Eastwood	1,873
Balderton	Conservative	K. Walker	2,054
Beeston North	Conservative	M. Victor	1,263
Beeston South	Labour	M. Warner	1,817
Bingham	Conservative	K. Thompson	3,023
Blidworth	Labour	R. Hinton	2,309
Blyth & Harworth	Labour	P. Abell	2,643
Bramcote & Stapleford East	Social and Liberal Democrats	D. Morton	2,271
Calverton	Labour	J. Stocks	2,112
Carlton Central	Conservative	E. Collin	2,049
Carlton East	Social and Liberal Democrats	R. Poynter	2,466
Carlton South	Conservative	H. Stanley	2,404
Carlton West	Conservative	B. Noble	2,157
Caunton	Conservative	R. Tow	2,907
Chilwell	Conservative	E. Hudson	1,873
Collingham	Conservative	E. Yates	2,058
Cotgrave	Conservative	C. Jeffreys	2,331
East Leake	Conservative	K. O'Toole	2,360
Eastwood & Brinsley	Labour	D. Pettitt	2,787
Greasley & Nuthall	Conservative	J. Taylor	2,870
Hucknall East	Labour	W. Whitehouse	2,676
Hucknall West	Labour	N. Smedley	3,227
Keyworth	Conservative	S. Pattinson	2,761
Kimberley & Trowell	Conservative	A. Briggs	1,989
Kirkby-in-Ashfield North	Labour	J. Thierry	2,499
Kirkby-in-Ashfield South	Labour	G. Young	2,607
Mansfield - Cumberlands & Ladybrook	Labour	K. Williams	2,355
Mansfield - Leeming & Forest Town	Labour	G. Scott	2,439
Mansfield - Northfield & Manor	Labour	R. Strauther	2,105
Mansfield - Oak Tree & Lindhurst	Labour	T. Butler	1,825
Mansfield - Oakham & Berry Hill	Conservative	E. Cheesewright	2,069
Mansfield - Pleasley Hill & Broomhill	Labour	J. Carter	1,830
Mansfield - Ravensdale & Sherwood	Labour	F. Warsop	1,880
Mansfield - Titchfield & Eakring	Labour	C. Winterton	1,959
Misterton	Conservative	K. Bullivant	2,136
Newark North	Labour	D. Green	1,784
Newark South	Labour	C. Bromfield	1,728
Newstead	Conservative	R. Spencer	2,305
Nottingham - Abbey	Conservative	F. Stannard	1,892
Nottingham - Aspley	Labour	F. Price	2,136
Nottingham - Basford	Labour	J. Heppell	2,386
Nottingham - Beechdale	Labour	W. Churchill	2,104
Nottingham - Bestwood Park	Labour	B. Grocock	2,113
Nottingham - Bilborough	Labour	M. Whittall	1,982
Nottingham - Bridge	Labour	G. Gawith	3,073
Nottingham - Bulwell East	Labour	S. Tipping	2,201
Nottingham - Bulwell West	Labour	F. Riddell	2,120
Nottingham - Byron	Labour	A. Simpson	2,164
Nottingham - Clifton East	Labour	A. Palmer	1,977
Nottingham - Clifton West	Labour	G. Dobson	2,145
Nottingham - Greenwood	Conservative	R. Tuck	1,810
Nottingham - Lenton	Labour	E. Campbell	2,066
Nottingham - Manvers	Labour	O. Powe	1,878
Nottingham - Mapperley	Conservative	J. Hewitt	1,596
Nottingham - Portland	Labour	D. Woodward	1,924
Nottingham - Radford	Labour	M. Aslam	2,301
Nottingham - Robin Hood	Social and Liberal Democrats	M. Forskitt	1,860
Nottingham - Sherwood	Conservative	J. Jenkins-Jones	1,529
Nottingham - St. Anns	Labour	M. Riaset	2,653
Nottingham - Strelley	Labour	P. Burgess	1,724
Nottingham - Trent	Labour	R. Stenson	1,733
Nottingham - Wilford	Conservative	J. Armstrong-Holmes	2,078
Nottingham - Wollaton	Conservative	J. Hayes	2,876
Ollerton	Labour	S. Smedley	3,578
Radcliffe-on-Trent	Conservative	K. Cutts	1,830
Retford North	Conservative	J. Bush	1,568
Retford South	Labour	M. Storey	1,759
Ruddington	Social and Liberal Democrats	S. Bennett	1,997
Rufford	Labour	M. Gray	2,847
Selston	Labour	J. Taylor	2,288
Southwell	Conservative	S. Stuart	2,954
Stapleford North & West	Labour	G. Miller	2,124
Sutton-in-Ashfield Central	Labour	W. Shaw	2,482
Sutton-in-Ashfield East	Labour	T. Barsby	2,284
Sutton-in-Ashfield North	Labour	J. Anthony	2,235
Sutton-in-Ashfield West	Labour	D. Kirkham	2,191
Toton & Attenborough	Conservative	T. Pettengell	2,040
Tuxford	Conservative	J. Hempsall	2,024
Warsop	Labour	B. Smith	2,921
West Bridgford East	Conservative	B. Borrett	1,602
West Bridgford South	Conservative	M. Cox	2,203
West Bridgford West	Conservative	B. Fairs	1,953
Worksop East	Labour	F. Groves	2,690
Worksop North & Carlton	Labour	A. Burton	2,260
Worksop South East & Welbeck	Labour	V. Smailes	2,092
Worksop West	Labour	A. Davison	1,983
