= Ashfield District Council elections =

Local government elections in Nottinghamshire, England

Ashfield District Council elections are held every four years. Ashfield District Council is the local authority for the non-metropolitan district of Ashfield in Nottinghamshire, England. Since the last boundary changes in 2015, 35 councillors are elected from 23 wards.

== Council elections ==
- 1973 Ashfield District Council election
- 1976 Ashfield District Council election (New ward boundaries)
- 1979 Ashfield District Council election
- 1983 Ashfield District Council election
- 1987 Ashfield District Council election
- 1991 Ashfield District Council election (District boundary changes took place but the number of seats remained the same)
- 1995 Ashfield District Council election (District boundary changes took place but the number of seats remained the same)
- 1999 Ashfield District Council election
- 2003 Ashfield District Council election (New ward boundaries)
- 2007 Ashfield District Council election
- 2011 Ashfield District Council election
- 2015 Ashfield District Council election (New ward boundaries)
- 2019 Ashfield District Council election
- 2023 Ashfield District Council election

== District result maps ==
2003 results map

2007 results map

2011 results map

2015 results map

2019 results map

2023 results map

== By-election results ==
=== 1999–2003 ===
Hucknall Central By-Election 4 May 2000
Party	Candidate	Votes	%	±%
Labour		445	31.8	−7.9
Conservative		420	30.0	+30.0
Independent Labour		211	15.1	+15.1
Liberal Democrats		205	14.7	+14.7
Independent		118	8.4	−23.1
Majority		25	1.8	
Turnout		1,399	28.1	
Labour hold		Swing		

Underwood By-Election 7 June 2001
Party	Candidate	Votes	%	±%
Labour	Stephen Mays	533	39.6	
Conservative	Eugene Di Villa	438	32.5	
Liberal Democrats	Philip Birkitt	375	27.9	
Majority		95	7.1	
Turnout		1,346		
Labour hold		Swing		

Woodhouse By-Election 18 July 2002
Party	Candidate	Votes	%	±%
Labour	Christopher Davidson	323	35.0	−15.3
Independent		249	27.0	+27.0
Independent		181	19.6	+19.6
Conservative		169	18.3	−31.4
Majority		74	8.0	
Turnout		922	15.9	
Labour gain from Conservative		Swing		

=== 2003–2007 ===
Hucknall West By-Election 13 July 2006
Party	Candidate	Votes	%	±%
Liberal Democrats	Austin Rathe	848	40.7	+40.7
Labour	Ian Briggs	514	24.7	−18.6
Independent	Ruth Welton	389	18.7	+18.7
BNP	Michael Clarke	331	15.9	−2.9
Majority		334	16.0	
Turnout		2,082		
Liberal Democrats gain from Conservative		Swing		

=== 2007–2011 ===
Sutton West By-Election 1 November 2007
Party	Candidate	Votes	%	±%
Liberal Democrats	Fiona Asbury	873	37.0	+37.0
Labour	Kier Barsby	560	23.7	−3.7
BNP	Michael Clarke	321	13.6	+13.6
Independent	John Ross	275	11.7	−38.2
Conservative	Michael Halls	257	10.9	−11.8
Green	Mark Harrison	72	3.1	+3.1
Majority		313	13.3	
Turnout		2,358	26.5	
Liberal Democrats gain from Independent		Swing		

Sutton-in-Ashfield North By-Election 4 June 2009
Party	Candidate	Votes	%	±%
Liberal Democrats	Margaret Patrick	996	33.8	−31.9
Labour	Scott Darrington	612	20.8	+4.0
Conservative	Michael Halls	519	17.6	+7.3
BNP	Michael Clarke	380	12.9	+12.9
Independent	Alfred Thorpe	299	10.2	+2.9
Green	Mark Harrison	140	4.8	+4.8
Majority		384	13.0	
Turnout		2,946		
Liberal Democrats hold		Swing		

Hucknall Central By-Election 20 August 2009
Party	Candidate	Votes	%	±%
Liberal Democrats	Kevin Moore	463	32.3	+18.8
Labour	Trevor Charles	392	27.3	+6.8
Conservative	Robert Copley	320	22.3	−7.7
UKIP	Ronald Nixon	181	12.6	+12.6
Independent	Diane Butler	79	5.5	−30.5
Majority		71	6.0	
Turnout		1,435	26.2	
Liberal Democrats gain from Independent		Swing		

Hucknall Central By-Election 11 February 2010
Party	Candidate	Votes	%	±%
Labour	Trevor Locke	675	38.4	+17.9
Conservative	Mick Murphy	437	24.9	−5.1
Liberal Democrats	Kenneth Cotham	357	20.3	+6.8
UKIP	Ronald Nixon	158	9.0	+9.0
BNP	Edward Holmes	131	7.5	+7.5
Majority		238	13.5	
Turnout		1,758	32.3	
Labour gain from Conservative		Swing		

=== 2011–2015 ===
Sutton in Ashfield Central By-Election 2 May 2013
Party	Candidate	Votes	%	±%
Labour	Jim Aspinall	1,250	56.6	+3.8
Independent	Tony Wallis	458	20.7	+20.7
Conservative	Shaun Hartley	317	14.4	+14.4
Liberal Democrats	Anthony Brewer	184	8.3	−19.4
Majority		792	35.9	
Turnout		2,209		
Labour hold		Swing		

=== 2015–2019 ===
Selston By-Election 26 November 2015
Party	Candidate	Votes	%	±%
Selston Parish Independents	Christine Quinn-Wilcox	1,180	66.5	+21.8
Independent	Anna Wilson	294	16.6	+16.6
Labour	Donna Gilbert	172	9.7	−4.3
UKIP	Ray Young	77	4.3	+4.3
Conservative	Michelle Sims	52	2.9	+2.9
Majority		886	49.9	
Turnout		1,775		
Selston Parish Independents hold		Swing		

Hucknall North By-Election 12 October 2017
Party	Candidate	Votes	%	±%
Ashfield Ind.	John Wilmott	1,329	51	N/A
Labour	Ian Morrison	629	24	N/A
Conservative	Sheila Clarke	532	20	N/A
UKIP	Stephen Crosby	66	3	N/A
Liberal Democrats	James Harvey	46	2	N/A
Ashfield Ind. gain from Conservative		Swing		

Sutton Junction and Harlow Wood By-Election 12 December 2018
Party	Candidate	Votes	%	±%
Ashfield Ind.	Matthew Relf	856	82	N/A
Labour	Kevin Ball	97	9	N/A
Conservative	Christine Self	48	4.6	N/A
Democrats and Veterans	Stephen Crosby	26	2.4	N/A
UKIP	Moira Samson	13	1.2	N/A
Liberal Democrats	Martin Howes	5	0.4	N/A
Ashfield Ind. gain from Labour		Swing		

=== 2019–2023 ===
Annesley and Kirkby Woodhouse By-Election 6 May 2021
Party	Candidate	Votes	%	±%
Ashfield Ind.	Jamie Bell	1,630	74.9	+2.1
Labour	Perry Woodhouse	547	25.1	+9.3
Majority		1,083	49.8	
Turnout		2,177		
Ashfield Ind. hold		Swing		

Skegby By-Election 6 May 2021
Party	Candidate	Votes	%	±%
Ashfield Ind.	Will Bostock	1,137	60.7	−20.3
Conservative	Sam Howlett	426	22.7	+18.1
Labour	Joanne Booker-Varley	310	16.6	+2.2
Majority		711	38.0	
Turnout		1,873		
Ashfield Ind. hold		Swing		

Hucknall Central By-Election 23 November 2022
Party	Candidate	Votes	%	±%
Ashfield Ind.	Nick Parvin	710	54.5	+17.9
Labour	John Wilkinson	397	30.5	+0.8
Conservative	Jan Lees	195	15.0	−3.9
Majority		313	24.0	
Turnout		1,302		
Ashfield Ind. hold		Swing		
