= 2027 Ashfield District Council election =

Local election in England

- 6 May 2026

All 35 seats to Ashfield District Council 18 seats needed for a majority

	First party	Second party	Third party
Leader	Samantha Deakin
Party	Ashfield Ind.	Reform	Conservative
Last election	32	0	2
Seats before	28	3	1
Leader before election
Samantha Deakin
Ashfield Ind.
Leader after election
TBD

The 2027 Ashfield District Council election will take place on 6 May 2027, to elect all 35 members of Ashfield District Council in England. This will be on the same day as other local elections held across the United Kingdom.

== Background ==
Ashfield is one of the seven non-metropolitan districts that make up Nottinghamshire County Council. The district was historically Labour controlled, with the party holding a majority from the district's creation until 2019 for all but 8 years. However, the Ashfield Independents have won landslide majorities at the two most recent elections. At the 2023 election the party formed a majority administration with 32 seats, opposed by 2 Conservatives and a single Labour councillor.

Jason Zadrozny was elected as leader of the council following the 2023 election. In September 2026, he resigned from his position and from the party following his conviction for fraud and tax evasion, stemming from the personal use of funds granted by Nottinghamshire County Council for heritage projects in Ashfield. Samantha Deakin was elected as his replacement.

=== Local government reorganisation ===
Ashfield is one of the districts planned to be abolished as part of upcoming structural changes to local government in England. The district is expected to form part of the Nottinghamshire unitary authority.

Initial plans for the reorganisation scheduled elections for the unitary authorities in May 2027 which entailed Ashfield's election being cancelled. Following the receipt of legal advice the Ministry of Housing, Communities and Local Government confirmed that the 2027 elections would take place on current local government boundaries.

== Previous council composition ==
After 2023 election		Before 2027 election	
Party	Seats	Party	Seats
Ashfield Ind.	35	Ashfield Ind.	28
Reform	0	Reform	3
Conservative	2	Conservative	1
Labour	1	Labour	0
Independent	0	Independent	3

=== Changes ===
- November 2024: Dawn Justice (Conservative) joins Reform
- January 2025: Andy Gascoyne (Ashfield Independents) joins Reform
- February 2026: Cathy Mason (Labour) joins Reform
- February 2026: Kier Barsby (Ashfield Independents) leaves party to sit as an independent
- September 2026:
  - Jason Zadrozny (Ashfield Independents) leaves party to sit as an independent
  - Warren Nuttall (Ashfield Independents) leaves party to sit as an independent (Note: Nuttall attempted to join Reform UK, but was rejected by the party.)
