= 2015 Ashfield District Council election =

2015 UK local government election

← 2011	7 May 2015	2019 →

All 35 seats to Ashfield District Council 18 seats needed for a majority
	First party	Second party	Third party
	Lab	LD	Con
Party	Labour	Liberal Democrats	Conservative
Last election	24, 40.4%	6, 23.2%	0, 11.6%
Seats won	22	5	4
Seat change	▼2	▼1	▲4
Popular vote	21,002	11,813	8,178
Percentage	35.1%	19.7%	13.6%
Swing	▼5.3%	▼3.5%	▲2.0%
- Map of the results of the election

The 2015 Ashfield District Council election took place on 7 May 2015, to elect members of Ashfield District Council in England. This was on the same day as other local elections.

== Overall election results ==
=== Ashfield District Council (Summary of Overall Results) ===
2015 Ashfield District Council election
Party	Candidates						Votes		
Party	Stood	Elected	Gained	Unseated	Net	% of total	%	No.	Net %
Labour	34	22			-2	62.9	35.1	21,002	
Liberal Democrats	23	5			-1	14.3	19.7	11,813	
Conservative	19	4	4	0	+4	11.4	13.6	8,178	
Independent	12	2			+1	5.7	7.9	4,720	
UKIP	16	0	0	0	0	0.0	14.1	8,436	
Selston Parish Independents	4	2	0	0	0	5.7	5.3	3,181	
Hucknall First Community Forum	7	0	0	0	0	0.0	2.8	1,660	
Green	3	0	0	0	0	0.0	1.3	775	
TUSC	1	0	0	0	0	0.0	0.3	151	

== Ashfield District Council - Results by Ward ==
=== Abbey Hill ===
Abbey Hill (1)
Party	Candidate	Votes	%
Labour	Joanne Donnely	480	35.3
Liberal Democrats	Andrew Meakin	316	23.2
UKIP	Moira Sansom	281	20.7
Conservative	Shaun Hartley	184	13.5
Independent	Warren Nuttall	99	7.3
Turnout		1,360	57.7

=== Annesley & Kirkby Woodhouse ===
Annesley & Kirkby Woodhouse (2)
Party	Candidate	Votes	%
Liberal Democrats	Rachel Madden	1,569	41.5
Labour	Don Davis	1,377	36.4
Labour	Donna Gilbert	1,208	32.0
Liberal Democrats	Steve Hare	1,098	29.1
UKIP	Wendy Harvey	1,022	27.0
Turnout		6,234	66.6

=== Ashfields ===
Ashfields (1)
Party	Candidate	Votes	%
Liberal Democrats	Tom Hollis	914	49.4
Labour	Mike Hollis	487	26.3
Conservative	John Baker	267	14.4
Independent	Eric Hetherington	184	9.9
Turnout		1,852	65.3

=== Carsic ===
Carsic (1)
Party	Candidate	Votes	%
Labour	Cathy Mason	904	63.3
Liberal Democrats	Daniel Williamson	305	21.5
Conservative	Rachel Saxelby	221	15.5
Turnout		1,429	50.6

=== Central & New Cross ===
Central & New Cross (2)
Party	Candidate	Votes	%
Labour	Amanda Brown	1,221	45.7
Labour	Tim Brown	1,139	42.6
UKIP	Ian Stokes	758	28.4
Liberal Democrats	Samantha Deakin	701	26.2
Liberal Democrats	Barrie Hickman	601	22.5
Turnout		4,387	51.9

=== Hucknall Central ===
Hucknall Central (2)
Party	Candidate	Votes	%
Labour	Lachlan Morrison	1,363	40.6
Labour	Nicolle Ndiweni	1,196	35.6
Conservative	Alex Cullin	932	27.7
UKIP	Thomas Irvine	860	25.6
Conservative	Dan Tysoe	652	19.4
UKIP	Steven Sadler	652	19.4
Hucknall First Community Forum	Jim Blagden	240	7.1
Hucknall First Community Forum	Dave Shaw	229	6.8
Liberal Democrats	Ken Cotham	205	6.1
Turnout			

=== Hucknall North ===
Hucknall North (3)
Party	Candidate	Votes	%
Conservative	Mick Murphy	1,820	35.5
Labour	Rachel Bissett	1,797	35.0
Conservative	Ben Bradley	1,673	32.6
Labour	James Grundy	1,517	29.6
Conservative	Rebecca-Anne Cullin	1,513	29.5
Labour	Ian Morrison	1,509	29.4
UKIP	Michael Ashton	1,067	20.8
Hucknall First Community Forum	John Wilmott	741	14.5
Hucknall First Community Forum	Rachael Clarke	506	9.9
Hucknall First Community Forum	Robert Gow	482	9.4
Green	Lisa Brown	435	8.5
Turnout			

=== Hucknall South ===
Hucknall South (2)
Party	Candidate	Votes	%
Labour	Lauren Mitchell	1,434	41.8
Labour	Keir Morrison	1,218	35.5
Conservative	Trevor Peat	1,028	30.0
Conservative	Tony Arnold	1,023	29.8
UKIP	Alison Irvine	879	25.6
Hucknall First Community Forum	Trevor Locke	343	10.0
Hucknall First Community Forum	John Stout	261	7.6
Turnout			

=== Hucknall West ===
Hucknall West (3)
Party	Candidate	Votes	%
Conservative	Kevin Thomas Rostance	1,753	37.9
Conservative	Phil Rostance	1,657	35.8
Labour	Chris Baron	1,641	35.5
Conservative	Anthony Rostance	1,633	35.3
Labour	Danielle Chance	1,550	33.5
Labour	Kerry Humphreys	1,511	32.6
UKIP	Jeffery Mills	1,060	22.9
UKIP	Ray Young	725	15.7
Hucknall First Community Forum	Jean Toseland	336	7.3
Hucknall First Community Forum	Harry Toseland	333	7.2
Hucknall First Community Forum	Ian Young	302	6.5
Turnout			

=== Huthwaite & Brierley ===
Huthwaite & Brierley (2)
Party	Candidate	Votes	%
Labour	Lee Anderson	1,168	34.9
Labour	Glenys Maxwell	1,147	34.3
Liberal Democrats	Dave Walters	742	22.2
Liberal Democrats	Mandy Hernon	728	21.8
Conservative	Rob Della-Spina	709	21.2
Independent	Anna-Marie Wilson	442	13.2
Independent	Mark Mellor	423	12.6
Independent	Malc Hull	371	11.1
Green	Roger Morton	236	7.1
Turnout			

=== Jacksdale ===
Jacksdale (1)
Party	Candidate	Votes	%
Liberal Democrats	Christian Chapman	562	35.4
Labour	Elizabeth Mays	537	33.8
Selston Parish Independents	David Martin	489	30.8
Turnout		1588	

=== Kingsway ===
Kingsway (1)
Party	Candidate	Votes	%
Labour	Mike Smith	762	50.3
Liberal Democrats	Adam Braddow	754	49.7
Turnout			

=== Kirby Cross & Portland ===
Kirby Cross & Portland (1)
Party	Candidate	Votes	%
Labour	Cheryl Butler	769	39.3
Liberal Democrats	Jamie Bell	586	29.9
UKIP	Tony Brown	499	25.5
Green	Mark Harrison	104	5.3
Turnout			

=== Larwood ===
Larwood (1)
Party	Candidate	Votes	%
Independent	Jason Zadrozny	842	47.0
Labour	Linford Gibbons	479	26.7
Conservative	Paul Sheridan	246	13.7
UKIP	Austin Hernon	224	12.5
Turnout			

=== Leamington ===
Leamington (1)
Party	Candidate	Votes	%
Labour	David Griffiths	986	70.2
Liberal Democrats	Paul Jones	407	29.8
Turnout			

=== Selston ===
Selston (2)
Party	Candidate	Votes	%
Selston Parish Independents	Beverley Turner	1,977	61.9
Independent	Samuel Wilson	1,427	44.7
Selston Parish Independents	Christine Quinn-Wilcox	738	23.1
Labour	John Robert Stocks	617	19.3
Labour	Steve Mays	564	17.7
Liberal Democrats	Mark Gibson	306	9.6
TUSC	Tom Hunt	95	3.0
Turnout			

=== Skegby ===
Skegby (2)
Party	Candidate	Votes	%
Liberal Democrats	Anthony Brewer	1,121	33.8
Labour	Paul Roberts	971	29.3
Liberal Democrats	Olive Parkes	958	28.9
UKIP	Barbara Harris	948	28.6
Labour	Christine Kirkham	936	28.3
Independent	Margaret Patrick	400	12.1
Turnout			

=== St Marys ===
St Marys (1)
Party	Candidate	Votes	%
Labour	Jim Aspinall	653	36.4
Liberal Democrats	Sara Carswell	487	27.1
Independent	Ray Buttery	326	18.2
Conservative	Paul Saxelby	273	15.2
TUSC	April Holmes	56	3.1
Turnout			

=== Stanton Hill & Teversal ===
Stanton Hill & Teversal (1)
Party	Candidate	Votes	%
Liberal Democrats	Helen Smith	637	43.4
Labour	Kevin Ball	467	31.8
Independent	Trish Phillips	365	24.8
Turnout			

=== Summit ===
Summit ward (2)
Party	Candidate	Votes	%
Labour	John Knight	1,172	42.4
Labour	Jackie James	1,152	41.7
UKIP	Janet Jeanes	838	30.3
Independent	John Baird	635	23.0
Liberal Democrats	Richard Zadrozny	359	13.0
Independent	Russell Wyke	233	8.4
Turnout			

=== Sutton Junction & Harlow Wood ===
Sutton Junction & Harlow Wood ward (1)
Party	Candidate	Votes	%
Labour	Steven Carroll	661	37.9
Liberal Democrats	Dawn Gent	655	37.5
Conservative	Sarah Heeley	430	24.6
Turnout			

=== The Dales ===
The Dales ward (1)
Party	Candidate	Votes	%
Labour	Helen Hollis	750	50.6
Liberal Democrats	Philip Smith	731	49.4
Turnout			

=== Underwood ===
Underwood ward (1)
Party	Candidate	Votes	%
Selston Parish Independents	Robert Sears-Piccavey	715	39.9
Liberal Democrats	Wendy O'Brien	456	25.4
Conservative	Michelle Sims	315	17.6
Labour	Ricky-Lee Cooke	306	17.1
Turnout			

== Changes between 2015 and 2019 ==
Christine Quinn-Wilcox (Selston Independents) retained a Selston seat for the Selston Independents in the 26 November 2015 by-election.

In November 2015 Independent Councillor Jason Zadrozny (Larwood), along with Liberal Democrats Councillors Tom Hollis (Ashfields), Rachel Madden (Annesley & Kirkby Woodhouse), Anthony Brewer (Skegby), Christian Chapman (Jacksdale) and Helen Smith (Stanton Hill & Teversal), formed the Ashfield Independents party.

These were joined by Beverly Gail Turner and Robert Sears-Piccavey (Underwood) to form the Ashfield Independents Group at Ashfield District Council. On the resignation of Beverly Gail Turner and election of Christine Quinn-Wilcox (Selston)

Further additions to the group, in April 2018 by former Labour Councillors Helen Hollis (The Dales), Glenys Maxwell (Huthwaite and Brierley), both sitting as independents, after a vote of no confidence in the then Labour Leader of the council, Cheryl Butler

John Wilmott (Ashfield Independents) gained a Hucknall North seat from the Conservatives in the 12 October 2017 by-election.

On 20 March 2018 Labour councillors Lee Anderson (Huthwaite and Brierley) and Chris Baron (Hucknall West) changed affiliation to the Conservatives, and Steve Carroll (Sutton Junction and Harlow Wood) left Labour to sit as an Independent.

In April 2018 Labour Councillors Amanda Brown (Central and New Cross), Tim Brown (Central and New Cross) and Joanne Donnelly (Abbey Hill) left the Labour Group to sit as Independents.

As a result of the above changes on 26 April 2018 The Ashfield Independents along with the rest of the Independents Group, joined by the Conservatives, forced a vote of no confidence in the Labour leadership and replaced Labour leader Councillor Cheryl Butler with Jason Zadrozny of the Ashfield Independents.

As of 1 May 2018 the current make up of the council is Labour 14 (-8), Ashfield Independents 11 (+11), Conservative Party 5 (+2), Independents 5 (+3) and Liberal Democrats 0 (-5).
