= 2023 Ashfield District Council election =

2023 English local election

- 4 May 2023

All 35 seats to Ashfield District Council 18 seats needed for a majority
- Turnout: 32.1%

	First party	Second party
Leader	Jason Zadrozny	Kevin Rostance
Party	Ashfield Ind.	Conservative
Seats before	28	3
Seats after	32	2
	Third party	Fourth party
Party	Independent	Labour
Seats before	2	2
Seats after	0	1
- Map of the results of the election. Colours denote the winning party, as shown in the main table of results.
Leader before election
Jason Zadrozny
Ashfield Ind.
Leader after election
Jason Zadrozny
Ashfield Ind.

The 2023 Ashfield District Council election took place on 4 May 2023, to elect all 35 members of Ashfield District Council in Nottinghamshire, England. This was on the same day as other local elections in England.

The previous election occurred in 2019, and resulted in the Ashfield Independents winning in a landslide victory of 30 seats. The 2023 election saw the Ashfield Independents increase their majority, finishing with 32 seats.

== Background ==
Labour controlled Ashfield from its creation in 1973 until 2003, when it fell into no overall control. Labour regained control in 2011 and held the council until 2019, when the Ashfield Independents won a large victory. In that election, Ashfield Independents won 30 seats with 64.6% of the vote, Labour won 2 with 18.2%, and the Conservatives won 3 with 11.2%.

== Previous council composition ==
After 2019 election		Before 2023 election	
Party	Seats	Party	Seats
Ashfield Ind.	30	Ashfield Ind.	28
Conservative	3	Conservative	3
Labour	2	Labour	2
Independent	0	Independent	2

=== Changes ===
- Melanie Darrington leaves Ashfield Independents to sit as an independent
- Ciaran Brown (Ashfield Independents) resigns; by-election held May 2021
- April 2020: Anthony Brewer (Ashfield Independents) dies; by-election held May 2021
- May 2020: David Hennigan leaves Ashfield Independents to sit as an independent
- May 2021: Jamie Bell (Ashfield Independents) and Will Bostock (Ashfield Independents) win by-elections
- August 2022: Jim Blagden (Ashfield Independents) dies; by-election held November 2022
- November 2022: Nick Parvin (Ashfield Independents) wins by-election

== Results summary ==
The overall results were as follows:

Party	Seats						Aggregate Votes		
Party	Candidates	Total	Gains	Losses	Net +/-	Of all (%)	Total	Of all (%)	Difference
Ashfield Ind.	35	32	4	2	▲2	91.4	25,412	51.6	-
Conservative	32	2	1	2	▼1	5.7	9,844	20.0	-
Labour	31	1	1	2	▼1	2.9	13,070	26.6	-
Liberal Democrats	3	0	0	0	Steady	0.0	615	1.2	-
TUSC	3	0	0	0	Steady	0.0	82	0.2	New
Independent	1	0	0	0	Steady	0.0	27	0.1	-
Breakthrough Party	1	0	0	0	Steady	0.0	153	0.3	New
Total	106	35					49,203	100.0	

== Ward results ==
The results for each ward were as follows, with an asterisk (*) indicating an incumbent councillor standing for re-election:

=== Abbey Hill ===
Abbey Hill (1)
Party	Candidate	Votes	%	±%
Ashfield Ind.	Andrew Victor Meakin*	473	68.1	−5
Labour	Sean Andrew White	149	21.4	+3
Conservative	Pat Rogerson	73	10.5	+9
Registered electors		2,285		
Rejected ballots		2	0.3	
Turnout		697	30.5	
Ashfield Ind. hold				

=== Annesley & Kirkby Woodhouse ===
Annesley & Kirkby Woodhouse (2)
Party	Candidate	Votes	%	±%
Ashfield Ind.	Rachel Elisabeth Madden*	1,117	28.6	−20
Ashfield Ind.	Jamie David Bell*	1,027	26.3	−14
Labour	Simon John Edward Bishop	615	15.8	+15
Labour	Donna Samantha Jane Gilbert	588	15.1	+16
Conservative	Richard Anthony Portas	278	7.1	+10
Conservative	Dale Saddington	249	6.4	+8
TUSC	Anthony Thomas Hunt	28	0.7	N/A
Registered electors		5,672		
Rejected ballots		8	0.4	
Turnout		2021	35.6	
Ashfield Ind. hold				
Ashfield Ind. hold				

=== Ashfields ===
Ashfields (1)
Party	Candidate	Votes	%	±%
Ashfield Ind.	David Thomas Walters*	421	45.7	−37
Labour	Margaret Ann Wilson	257	27.9	+18
Conservative	Sam Ansell	243	26.4	+19
Registered electors		2,969		
Rejected ballots		2	0.2	
Turnout		923	31.1	
Ashfield Ind. hold				

=== Carsic ===
Carsic (1)
Party	Candidate	Votes	%	±%
Labour	Cathy Mason	332	45.4	+20
Ashfield Ind.	Joel Martyn Meakin	236	32.2	−40
Conservative	Tony Johnson	137	18.7	+16
Independent	Derrick Etches	27	3.7	N/A
Registered electors		2,649		
Rejected ballots		3	0.4	
Turnout		735	27.7	
Labour gain from Ashfield Ind.		Swing		

=== Greenwood & Summit ===
Greenwood & Summit (2) (Note: Renamed from Summit.)
Party	Candidate	Votes	%	±%
Ashfield Ind.	Christopher Huskinson	746	30.6	−19
Ashfield Ind.	Warren Nuttall	744	30.6	−11
Labour	Enid Bakewell	356	14.6	+14
Labour	Linford Gibbons	336	13.8	+14
Conservative	Lee Scothern	136	5.6	+9
Conservative	Simon Wright	116	4.8	+7
Registered electors		4,940		
Turnout		1252	25.3	
Ashfield Ind. hold		Swing		
Ashfield Ind. hold				

=== Hucknall Central ===
Hucknall Central (2)
Party	Candidate	Votes	%	±%
Ashfield Ind.	Nick Parvin*	860	27.2	+13
Ashfield Ind.	Lee Waters*	826	26.2	+12
Labour	Ria Cash	627	19.9	+6
Labour	John Hartley Wilkinson	529	16.8	+1
Conservative	Jaimie McPherson	234	7.4	−6
Liberal Democrats	James Alan Harvey	82	2.6	N/A
Registered electors		5,549		
Rejected ballots		10	0.6	
Turnout		1705	30.7	
Ashfield Ind. hold				
Ashfield Ind. hold				

=== Hucknall North ===
Hucknall North (3)
Party	Candidate	Votes	%	±%
Ashfield Ind.	John Morton Anthony Wilmott*	1,371	20.0	−12
Ashfield Ind.	Anna Ellis	1,277	18.7	−12
Ashfield Ind.	Gordon Kenneth Mann	1,218	17.8	−13
Labour	Patrick Stephen Ayres	892	13.0	+14
Labour	David Kenneth Warwick	815	11.9	+13
Liberal Democrats	Martin Alan Howes	388	5.7	+9
Conservative	Lewis Jake Wright	368	5.4	+5
Conservative	Steve Wright	365	5.3	+7
Liberal Democrats	Kevin Alan Stevenson	145	2.1	−4
Registered electors		7,784		
Rejected ballots		11	0.4	
Turnout		2609	33.5	
Ashfield Ind. hold				
Ashfield Ind. hold				
Ashfield Ind. hold				

=== Hucknall South ===
Hucknall South (2)
Party	Candidate	Votes	%	±%
Ashfield Ind.	Trevor Charles Locke*	845	33.8	+26
Ashfield Ind.	Oliver John Hay	707	28.3	+18
Labour	Stuart Bell	634	25.4	+2
Conservative	Dave Randall	311	12.5	−11
Registered electors		5,485		
Rejected ballots		7	0.4	
Turnout		1577	28.8	
Ashfield Ind. gain from Labour		Swing		
Ashfield Ind. gain from Labour		Swing		

=== Hucknall West ===
Hucknall West (3)
Party	Candidate	Votes	%	±%
Ashfield Ind.	David Paul Shaw*	1,070	17.0	+15
Ashfield Ind.	Ian John Briggs	987	15.7	+13
Conservative	Phil Rostance*	896	14.2	−7
Conservative	Kevin Thomas Rostance*	881	14.0	−8
Ashfield Ind.	Paul Craddock	878	14.0	+10
Labour	Richard Speight	724	11.5	+3
Conservative	Jan Lees	699	11.1	−6
Breakthrough Party	Andrew James Alexander Meikle	153	2.4	N/A
Registered electors		7,901		
Rejected ballots		6	0.2	
Turnout		2422	30.7	
Ashfield Ind. gain from Conservative		Swing		
Ashfield Ind. gain from Conservative		Swing		
Conservative hold				

=== Huthwaite & Brierley ===
Huthwaite & Brierley (2)
Party	Candidate	Votes	%	±%
Ashfield Ind.	Tom Hollis*	854	22.3	−39
Ashfield Ind.	Paul Ernest Grafton	848	22.2	−35
Labour	Stefan Lamb	726	19.0	+23
Labour	Jayne Anne Lilliman	690	18.0	+22
Conservative	John Antony Howlett	359	9.4	+14
Conservative	Graham Lynk	351	9.2	+14
Registered electors		5,573		
Rejected ballots		10	0.5	
Turnout		2025	36.3	
Ashfield Ind. hold		Swing		
Ashfield Ind. hold		Swing		

=== Jacksdale & Westwood ===
Jacksdale & Westwood (1) (Note: Renamed from Jacksdale.)
Party	Candidate	Votes	%	±%
Ashfield Ind.	Julie Anne Dawn Gregory	529	68.9	−13
Labour	Christopher Varnam	136	17.7	+11
Conservative	Chris Baron*	103	13.4	+11
Registered electors		2,529		
Rejected ballots		2	0.3	
Turnout		770	30.4	
Ashfield Ind. hold				

=== Kingsway ===
Kingsway (1)
Party	Candidate	Votes	%	±%
Ashfield Ind.	Dale Anthony Grounds*	423	57.1	−15
Labour	Clare Marie West	211	28.5	+13
Conservative	Darren Clay	107	14.4	+9
Registered electors		2,295		
Rejected ballots		2	0.3	
Turnout		743	32.4	
Ashfield Ind. hold				

=== Kirkby Cross & Portland ===
Kirkby Cross & Portland (1)
Party	Candidate	Votes	%	±%
Ashfield Ind.	Sarah Jane Lewsey	500	46.6	−26
Labour	Cheryl Butler	345	32.2	+10
Conservative	Sam Howlett	228	21.2	+16
Registered electors		3,045		
Rejected ballots		6	0.6	
Turnout		1075	35.3	
Ashfield Ind. hold				

=== Larwood ===
Larwood (1)
Party	Candidate	Votes	%	±%
Ashfield Ind.	Jason Bernard Zadrozny*	587	61.5	−19
Labour	Adam Neville Bright	206	21.6	+9
Conservative	Jack Stuart Middleton	161	16.9	+11
Registered electors		2,944		
Rejected ballots		3	0.3	
Turnout		957	32.5	
Ashfield Ind. hold				

=== Leamington ===
Leamington (1)
Party	Candidate	Votes	%	±%
Ashfield Ind.	Sarah Madigan	351	48.0	−24
Labour	Kerry Thornton	277	37.8	+19
Conservative	Stuart Peach	89	12.2	+8
TUSC	Ruth Stevens	15	2.0	N/A
Registered electors		2,757		
Rejected ballots		2	0.3	
Turnout		734	26.6	
Ashfield Ind. hold				

=== Selston ===
Selston (2)
Party	Candidate	Votes	%	±%
Ashfield Ind.	Andy Gascoyne*	863	27.8	−2
Ashfield Ind.	Arnie Hankin*	832	26.8	−2
Labour	Colleen Flint	387	12.5	+17
Labour	Rob Brooks	362	11.7	+18
Conservative	Mark Bradshaw	343	11.0	+17
Conservative	Cam Felton	319	10.3	+18
Registered electors		4,865		
Rejected ballots		5	0.3	
Turnout		1603	32.9	
Ashfield Ind. hold		Swing		
Ashfield Ind. hold				

=== Skegby ===
Skegby (2)
Party	Candidate	Votes	%	±%
Ashfield Ind.	Jodine Cronshaw	715	23.0	−35
Ashfield Ind.	Will Bostock	712	22.9	−35
Labour	George Watson	519	16.7	+18
Labour	Michael Barber	474	15.3	+17
Conservative	Keith Broughton	385	12.4	+19
Conservative	Roman Gasecki	301	9.7	+15
Registered electors		5,029		
Rejected ballots		2	0.1	
Turnout		1648	32.8	
Ashfield Ind. hold		Swing		
Ashfield Ind. hold				

=== Stanton Hill & Teversal ===
Stanton Hill & Teversal (1)
Party	Candidate	Votes	%	±%
Ashfield Ind.	Helen-Ann Smith	426	46.0	−37
Labour	Lee Haywood	381	41.1	+29
Conservative	Bill Rogerson	120	12.9	+8
Registered electors		2,613		
Rejected ballots		3	0.3	
Turnout		930	35.6	
Ashfield Ind. hold		Swing		

=== Sutton Central & New Cross ===
Sutton Central & New Cross (2) (Note: Renamed from Central & New Cross.)
Party	Candidate	Votes	%	±%
Ashfield Ind.	Samantha Kay Deakin*	677	25.4	−33
Ashfield Ind.	Vicki Heslop	551	20.6	−31
Labour	Max Patrick Everett	381	14.3	+12
Conservative	Shinto Mathew	380	14.2	+23
Conservative	Karen Jayne Shaw	325	12.2	+20
Labour	Margaret Betty Renshaw	316	11.8	+9
TUSC	Lea Sharpe	39	1.5	N/A
Registered electors		5,382		
Rejected ballots		4	0.3	
Turnout		1419	26.4	
Ashfield Ind. hold				
Ashfield Ind. hold				

=== Sutton Junction & Harlow Wood ===
Sutton Junction & Harlow Wood (1)
Party	Candidate	Votes	%	±%
Ashfield Ind.	Matthew Relf	525	55.2	−33
Conservative	Mitch Mitchell	260	27.3	+24
Labour	Marcus Everett	166	17.5	+8
Registered electors		2,691		
Rejected ballots		2	0.2	
Turnout		953	35.4	
Ashfield Ind. hold		Swing		

=== Sutton St Mary's ===
Sutton St Mary's (1) (Note: Renamed from St Mary's.)
Party	Candidate	Votes	%	±%
Ashfield Ind.	Kier Barsby*	355	38.4	−40
Conservative	Christopher Barton-Hanson	298	32.2	+28
Labour	Rebekkah Sisson	272	29.4	+11
Registered electors		2,746		
Rejected ballots		5	0.5	
Turnout		930	33.9	
Ashfield Ind. hold		Swing		

=== The Dales ===
The Dales (1)
Party	Candidate	Votes	%	±%
Ashfield Ind.	John Smallridge	351	45.5	−38
Labour	Jackie Barber	239	31.0	+19
Conservative	Angela Bentley	182	23.6	+19
Registered electors		2,324		
Rejected ballots		1	0.1	
Turnout		773	33.3	
Ashfield Ind. hold		Swing		

=== Underwood ===
Underwood (1)
Party	Candidate	Votes	%	±%
Conservative	Dawn Justice	547	46.2	+16
Ashfield Ind.	David Martin	510	43.0	−11
Labour	Sebastian Wilson	128	10.8	+7
Registered electors		2,584		
Rejected ballots		8	0.7	
Turnout		1193	46.2	
Conservative gain from Ashfield Ind.		Swing		

== Changes 2023–2027 ==
- Council leader Jason Zadrozny, arrested in November 2022, was charged in June 2023 and is due to stand trial on 24 August 2026; see Changes 2019–2023 on the 2019 election article for the full account.
- November 2024: Dawn Justice (Underwood) defects from the Conservative Party to Reform UK, becoming the party's first councillor on Ashfield District Council. Her move left Phil Rostance (Hucknall West) as the council's only remaining Conservative; the two later formed a joint Conservative–Reform UK opposition group, with Rostance as Leader of the Opposition.
- January 2025: Andy Gascoyne (Selston) defects from Ashfield Independents to Reform UK, becoming its second councillor on the authority.
- 7 February 2025: Cathy Mason (Carsic) defects from the Labour Party to Reform UK, becoming the first Labour councillor in the country to do so and leaving the authority without any Labour representation.
- January 2026: Kier Barsby (Sutton St Mary's) leaves the Ashfield Independents group to sit as an unaligned independent, amid a dispute over deputy leader Tom Hollis; Barsby said he had resigned over concern that the authority was being brought into disrepute, while group leader Jason Zadrozny said Barsby had been removed from the group.
- 22 October 2026: 10 Ashfield Independents resigned from the party to sit as unaligned independents following former leader Jason Zadrozny being found guilty of nine counts of fraud and four counts of tax evasion, leaving the party with a majority of 1.

No by-elections will be held now since the 6th Month Deadline has passed before the 2027 Local Elections.
