= Zadorozhny (surname) =

Zadorozhny is an East Slavic surname originating in Russia and Ukraine. It appears in various forms depending on the language, gender, and transliteration method. It is related to Zadrożny, a surname which originated in Poland.

== Transliterations ==
Countries of origin	Masculine	Feminine
Russia	Задорожный (Zadorozhny, Zadorozhnyi, Zadorozhnyy, Zadorozhnyj)	Задорожная (Zadorozhnaya, Zadorozhnaia, Zadorozhnaja)
Ukraine	Задорожний (Zadorozhny, Zadorozhnyi, Zadorozhnyy, Zadorozhnyj); Задорожній (Zadorozhniy, Zadorozhnii, Zadorozhnij)	Задорожна (Zadorozhna)
Belarus	Задарожны (Zadarožny)	Задарожная (Zadarožnaja)
Other countries
Czechia; Slovakia	Zadorožný, Zádorožný	Zadorožná, Zádorožná
Estonia; Lithuania; Latvia	Zadorožnõi; Zadorožnas, Zadorožnis; Zadorožnijs	Zadorožnaja, Zadorožna; Zadorožnaja, Zadorožna, Zadorožnaitė, Zadorožnienė; Zadorožnaja
France	Zadorojnyi	Zadorojnaia, Zadorojna
Hungary	Zadorozsni	
Moldova; Romania	Zadorojnîi	Zadorojnaia, Zadorojna
Poland	Zadorożny (not to be confused with Zadrożny)	Zadorożna (not to be confused with Zadrożna)

== People ==
- Anastasia Zadorozhnaya (born 1985), Russian actress
- Andrey Zadorozhniy (born 1973), Russian runner
- Andriy Zadorozhny (born 1968), Ukrainian lawyer and human rights activist
- Jordon Zadorozny (born 1974), Canadian musician
- Lyubov Zadorozhnaya (born 1942), Russian cyclist
- Serhiy Zadorozhnyi (born 1976), Ukrainian footballer
- Yelena Zadorozhnaya (born 1977), Russian runner

== See also ==
- Zadrozny, a surname from a Polish cognate
- Задорожный - значение фамилии
