= Zadrożny =

Polish-language surname

Zadrożny (feminine: Zadrożna, plural Zadrożni) is a Polish-language surname. The ż is pronounced like the g in mirage. Its literal meaning is "[from] across the road". Notable people with the surname include:

- Brandy Zadrozny (born 1980), American investigative journalist
- Katarzyna Walter (born 1960), Polish actress, anso credited as Katarzyna Zadrożny and Ewa Zadrożna
- Jason Zadrozny (born 1980), British politician

== See also ==
- Zadorozhny (surname), an East Slavic cognate
