= I Like Bats =

1985 Polish film by Grzegorz Warchol

- Theatrical release poster
- Directed by: Grzegorz Warchol
- Written by: Krystyna Kofta
- Starring: Katarzyna Walter; Marek Barbasiewicz; Małgorzata Lorentowicz; Jonasz Kofta
- Cinematography: Krzysztof Pakulski
- Music by: Zbigniew Preisner
- Production company: Zespół Filmowy "Perspektywa"
- Release date: 1985
- Running time: 79 minutes
- Country: Poland
- Language: Polish

I Like Bats (Polish: Lubię nietoperze) is a 1985 Polish horror comedy film directed by Grzegorz Warchol and written by Krystyna Kofta. It stars Katarzyna Walter as Izabela, a vampire who wants to be a human.

== Cast ==
- Katarzyna Walter as Izabela
- Marek Barbasiewicz as Professor Rudolf Jung
- Małgorzata Lorentowicz as Izy's aunt
- Jonasz Kofta as Drug addict
- Edwin Petrykat as Marceli
- Jan Prochyra as Grześ Peruka
- Andrzej Bielski as Patient at Jung's clinic

== Home media ==
In 2022, I Like Bats was released on Blu-ray by Severin Films, as part of a four-film box set titled House of Psychotic Women Rarities Collection.
