= 2003 Ashfield District Council election =

2003 UK local government election

Map of the results of the 2003 Ashfield council election. Labour in red, Independent in grey, Greens in green and Conservatives in blue.

The 2003 Ashfield District Council election took place on 1 May 2003 to elect members of Ashfield District Council in Nottinghamshire, England. The whole council was up for election with boundary changes since the last election in 1999. The Labour party lost overall control of the council to no overall control.

== Election result ==
The results saw Labour lose their majority on the council after independents gained 12 seats and Labour lost 15 seats.

Ashfield local election result 2003
Party	Seats	Gains	Losses	Net gain/loss	Seats %	Votes %	Votes	+/−
Labour	16			-15	48.5	52.0	17,551	
Independent	14			+12	42.4	34.8	11,763	
Green	2			+2	6.1	4.5	1,518	
Conservative	1			+1	3.0	7.3	2,473	
BNP	0			0	0	1.4	472	

7 Labour candidates were unopposed.

== Ward results ==
Hucknall Central (2)
Party	Candidate	Votes	%	±%
Labour	Trevor Locke	848		
Labour	Charles Short	831		
Conservative	Gordon Riley	784		
Turnout		2,463	30.5	

Hucknall East (2)
Party	Candidate	Votes	%	±%
Labour	Kenneth Creed	708		
Independent	Geoffrey Thorpe	624		
Labour	Yvonne White	588		
Turnout		1,920	26.3	

Hucknall North (2)
Party	Candidate	Votes	%	±%
Independent	Robert Gow	841		
Labour	John Wilmott	774		
Conservative	Michael Murphy	739		
Labour	Patrick Wren	620		
Turnout		2,974	32.3	

Hucknall West (3)
Party	Candidate	Votes	%	±%
Labour	James Blagden	1,088		
Labour	Simon Harris	1,005		
Conservative	Brian Connor	950		
Labour	John Knight	807		
BNP	Barry Hodgson	472		
Turnout		4,322	28.7	

Jacksdale
Party	Candidate	Votes	%	±%
Labour	Edward Holmes	495	76.2	
Independent	Frank Wood	155	23.8	
Majority		340	52.3	
Turnout		650	25.8	

Kirkby-in-Ashfield Central (2)
Party	Candidate	Votes	%	±%
Independent	Antony Brown	952		
Independent	Rachel Madden	888		
Labour	Alan Butler	530		
Labour	Peter Thorpe	370		
Green	Andrew Finlayson	188		
Turnout		2,928	32.4	

Kirky-in-Ashfield East (2)
Party	Candidate	Votes	%	±%
Independent	Wendy Harvey	610		
Independent	Harold Greasley	586		
Labour	Jean Tomlinson	357		
Labour	Warren Nuttall	325		
Turnout		1,878	22.4	

Kirky-in-Ashfield West (2)
Party	Candidate	Votes	%	±%
Independent	John Baird	955		
Independent	David Spalding	774		
Labour	Glennis Thierry	387		
Labour	Beverly Meszaros	320		
Turnout		2,436	26.1	

Selston (2)
Party	Candidate	Votes	%	±%
Independent	Beverley Turner	750		
Independent	Petro Clarke	708		
Labour	Christopher Bonam	596		
Labour	Elaine Bonam	570		
Turnout		2,624	27.1	

Sutton-In-Ashfield Central (3)
Party	Candidate	Votes	%	±%
Labour	Lesley Matthews	unopposed		
Labour	Alan Price	unopposed		
Labour	Margaret Thorpe	unopposed		

Sutton-In-Ashfield East (3)
Party	Candidate	Votes	%	±%
Labour	May Barsby	1,091		
Independent	George Toy	1,009		
Labour	Derek Young	962		
Labour	David Parker	952		
Turnout		4,014	24.0	

Sutton-In-Ashfield North (3)
Party	Candidate	Votes	%	±%
Labour	Beryl Anthony	unopposed		
Labour	John Bennett	unopposed		
Labour	Jessie Parker	unopposed		

Sutton-In-Ashfield West (3)
Party	Candidate	Votes	%	±%
Independent	Ramon Buttery	1,020		
Independent	Terence Keetley	977		
Independent	Roy Adkins	914		
Labour	David Shooter	824		
Labour	Kier Barsby	717		
Labour	Hilda Holmes	616		
Turnout		5,068	23.5	

Underwood
Party	Candidate	Votes	%	±%
Labour	Stephen Mays	unopposed		

Woodhouse (2)
Party	Candidate	Votes	%	±%
Green	Justin Smith	687		
Green	Mark Harrison	643		
Labour	Martin Carey	633		
Labour	Christopher Davidson	537		
Turnout		2,500	25.7	
