= 2011 Ashfield District Council election =

2011 UK local government election

- 21 May 2011

All 33 seats to Ashfield District Council 17 seats needed for a majority
	First party	Second party	Third party
Party	Labour	Conservative	Liberal Democrats

Map of the results of the 2011 Ashfield council election. Labour in red, Liberal Democrats in yellow and Independents in grey.

The 2011 Ashfield District Council election took place on 5 May 2011 to elect members of Ashfield District Council in Nottinghamshire, England. The whole council was up for election and the Labour Party gained overall control of the council from no overall control.

== Background ==
Before the 2011 election the Liberal Democrats formed the largest group on the council and following the 2007 election had led the council. However the Labour, independent and Conservative councillors joined together to oust the Liberal Democrats, Labour's John Knight then became the leader of the council. This lasted until the 2013 County Elections when due to a conflict with also being a Councillor at county level he stood down as leader. Since then the leader of Ashfield District Council has been Chris Baron.

Before the election the Liberal Democrats had 13 councillors, compared to 10 independents, 9 Labour and 1 Conservative. Both the Labour and Liberal Democrat parties put up 33 candidates in the election, compared to 13 Conservatives, with 9 of the 13 Conservative candidates being in Hucknall, which was seen as the Conservatives best area. There were 9 seats to be contested over 4 wards in Hucknall all of which Labour returned all 9.

Three days before the election the national Labour leader Ed Miliband visited Kirkby in Ashfield to campaign in the local elections. He also visited Hucknall during his Labour leadership campaign in 2010.

== Election result ==
The results had Labour gain 15 seats to win a majority on the council with 24 of the 33 seats. Both the independents and Liberal Democrats lost 7 seats, to fall to 3 and 6 seats respectively. Meanwhile, the only Conservative councillor, John Dymock, lost his seat in Hucknall North. Overall turnout in the election was slightly under 39%.

Ashfield local election result 2011
Party	Seats	Gains	Losses	Net gain/loss	Seats %	Votes %	Votes	+/−
Labour	24	15	0	+15	72.7	45.3	34,030	+16.7
Liberal Democrats	6	0	7	-7	18.2	25.6	19,234	+0.3
Independent	3	0	7	-7	9.1	15.9	11,982	-11.8
Conservative	0	0	1	-1	0.0	11.2	8,389	-1.4
Green	0	0	0	0	0.0	0.9	672	-1.1
English Democrat	0	0	0	0	0.0	0.8	600	+0.7
UKIP	0	0	0	0	0.0	0.3	225	-0.2

== Ward results ==
=== Hucknall Central ===
Hucknall Central (2 seats)
Party	Candidate	Votes	%
Labour	Trevor Locke (E)	1,281	30.3
Labour	Lachlan Morrison (E)	1,161	27.5
Conservative	Benjamin Marshall	763	18.1
Conservative	Steven Sadler	694	16.4
Liberal Democrats	Adam Braddow	184	4.4
Liberal Democrats	Karen Day	142	3.4
Turnout		4,225	40.4
Labour hold			
Labour gain from Liberal Democrats			

=== Hucknall East ===
Hucknall East (2 seats)
Party	Candidate	Votes	%
Labour	Keir Morrison (E)	928	22.8
Labour	Dave Shaw (E)	882	21.7
Conservative	Trevor Peat	690	17.0
Conservative	Ian Smith	616	15.2
Independent	Richard Darrington	403	9.9
Independent	Robert Rankin	309	7.6
Liberal Democrats	Nicole Knight	151	3.7
Liberal Democrats	James Moore	85	2.1
Turnout		4,064	36.7
Labour gain from Conservative			
Labour hold			

=== Hucknall North ===
Hucknall North (2 Seats)
Party	Candidate	Votes	%
Labour	John Wilmott (E)	1,075	25.1
Labour	Ian Morrison (E)	1,012	23.7
Conservative	Robert Copley	682	15.9
Conservative	John Dymock	643	15.0
Independent	Bob Gow	289	6.8
UKIP	Ron Nixon	225	5.3
Green	Lisa-Jane Brown	163	3.8
Liberal Democrats	David Paylor	101	2.4
Liberal Democrats	Nicola Ellis	90	2.1
Turnout		4,280	43.2
Labour hold			
Labour gain from Conservative			

=== Hucknall West ===
Hucknall West (3 Seats)
Party	Candidate	Votes	%
Labour	Chris Baron (E)	1,277	16.0
Labour	Ken Knight (E)	1,198	15.0
Labour	Jim Grundy (E)	1,169	14.7
Conservative	Kevin Rostance	1,013	12.7
Conservative	Mick Murphy	918	11.5
Conservative	Anthony Arnold	795	10.0
Liberal Democrats	Harry Toseland	450	5.7
Liberal Democrats	Jean Toseland	420	5.3
Liberal Democrats	Kenneth Cotham	373	4.7
Independent	Alan Davies	351	4.4
Turnout		7,964	39.3
Labour gain from Liberal Democrats			
Labour gain from Liberal Democrats			
Labour gain from Liberal Democrats			

=== Jacksdale ===
Jacksdale (1 Seat)
Party	Candidate	Votes	%
Labour	Liz Mays (E)	412	41.4
Liberal Democrats	Benjamin Rathe	329	33.0
Selston Area Independents Putting People First	Diane Butler	255	25.6
Turnout		996	39.9
Labour hold			

=== Kirkby-in-Ashfield Central ===
Kirkby-in-Ashfield Central (2 Seats)
Party	Candidate	Votes	%
Labour	Cheryl Butler (E)	1,101	24.1
Liberal Democrats	Rachel Madden (E)	972	21.3
Labour	Adam Mohammed	932	20.4
Liberal Democrats	Austin Rathe	763	16.7
Independent	Tony Brown	370	8.1
Independent	Terry Coleman	163	3.6
Green	Mark Harrison	134	2.9
Green	David Lowe	128	2.8
Turnout		4,563	47.0
Labour gain from Independent			
Liberal Democrats hold			

=== Kirkby-in-Ashfield East ===
Kirkby-in-Ashfield East (2 seats)
Party	Candidate	Votes	%
Labour	Linford Gibbons (E)	661	22.0
Labour	Warren Nuttall (E)	626	20.8
Independent	Wendy Harvey	538	17.9
Independent	Pat Simms	414	13.8
Liberal Democrats	Linda Mullaney	407	13.5
Liberal Democrats	Rebecca Mullaney	361	12.0
Turnout		3,007	34.5
Labour gain from Independent			
Labour hold			

=== Kirkby-in-Ashfield West ===
Kirkby-in-Ashfield West (2 seats)
Party	Candidate	Votes	%
Labour	John Knight (E)	901	27.9
Labour	Andrew Davidson (E)	781	24.2
Independent	John Baird	712	22.1
Independent	Karen Black	442	13.7
Liberal Democrats	Sadie Kime	200	6.2
Liberal Democrats	Kelly Hurst	197	6.1
Turnout		3,233	35.3
Labour hold			
Labour gain from Independent			

=== Selston ===
Selston (2 seats)
Party	Candidate	Votes	%
Selston Area Independents Putting People First	Gail Turner (E)	1,678	41.1
Selston Area Independents Putting People First	Sam Wilson (E)	1,463	35.8
Labour	Natalie Fleet	380	9.3
Labour	Pete Spencer	347	8.5
Liberal Democrats	Richard Zadrozny	124	3.0
Liberal Democrats	Nicola Gunton-Day	95	2.3
Turnout		4,087	43.3
Independent hold			
Independent hold			

=== Sutton-In-Ashfield Central ===
Sutton-In-Ashfield Central (3 seats)
Party	Candidate	Votes	%
Labour	Mick Coppin (E)	1,583	22.0
Labour	Tim Brown (E)	1,425	19.8
Labour	David Kirkham (E)	1,281	17.8
Liberal Democrats	Michelle Gent	831	11.5
Liberal Democrats	Kirsty Evans	805	11.2
Liberal Democrats	Trevor Gent	705	9.8
Independent	Dale Gratton	583	8.1
Turnout		7,213	34.7
Labour hold			
Labour hold			
Labour hold			

=== Sutton-In-Ashfield East ===
Sutton-In-Ashfield East (3 seats)
Party	Candidate	Votes	%
Labour	Steven Carroll (E)	1,443	17.0
Labour	May Barsby (E)	1,335	16.1
Labour	Kier Barsby (E)	1,275	15.4
Liberal Democrats	Craig Day	981	11.8
Liberal Democrats	Christine Wakefield	934	11.3
Liberal Democrats	James Gibson	928	11.2
The Sutton Independent Group	Mick Parker	722	8.7
Independent	Tony Wallis	667	8.1
Turnout		8,285	36.3
Labour gain from Independent			
Labour hold			
Labour gain from Independent			

=== Sutton-In-Ashfield North ===
Sutton-In-Ashfield North (3 seats)
Party	Candidate	Votes	%
Liberal Democrats	Jason Zadrozny (E)	1,574	17.1
Liberal Democrats	Ann Patrick (E)	1,398	15.2
Liberal Democrats	Thomas Hollis (E)	1,377	15.0
Labour	Scott Darrington	1,303	14.2
Labour	Trish Phillips	1,214	13.2
Labour	Kevin Ball	1,184	12.9
Conservative	John Baker	478	5.2
Conservative	Sylvia Baker	433	4.7
Green	Fiona Keen	247	2.7
Turnout		9,208	41.6
Liberal Democrats hold			
Liberal Democrats hold			
Liberal Democrats hold			

=== Sutton-In-Ashfield West ===
Sutton-In-Ashfield West (3 seats)
Party	Candidate	Votes	%
Labour	Glenys Maxwell (E)	1,215	14.5
Labour	Terry Keetley (E)	1,197	14.3
Independent	Ray Buttery (E)	1,167	13.9
Labour	Paul Roberts	1,120	13.4
Liberal Democrats	Fiona Asbury	788	9.4
Conservative	Paul Saxelby	664	7.9
Independent	Anna Wilson	645	7.7
Independent	Mark Beagley	560	6.7
Liberal Democrats	Scott Asbury	551	6.6
Liberal Democrats	Sam Hayward-Vernon	483	5.8
Turnout		8,390	37.3
Labour gain from Independent			
Labour gain from Liberal Democrats			
Independent hold			

=== Underwood ===
Underwood (1 seat)
Party	Candidate	Votes	%
Liberal Democrats	Robert Sears-Piccavey	497	48.3
Labour	Steve Mays	282	27.4
Selston Area Independents Putting People First	Bob Green	251	24.4
Turnout		1,030	44.6
Liberal Democrats hold			

=== Woodhouse ===
Woodhouse (2)
Party	Candidate	Votes	%
Labour	Don Davis (E)	1,081	23.6
Liberal Democrats	Helen Smith (E)	995	21.7
Labour	Charlotte Watson	968	21.1
Liberal Democrats	Tony Theaker	943	20.6
English Democrat	Tony Ellis	371	8.1
English Democrat	Carole Terzza	229	5.0
Turnout		4,587	42.4
Labour gain from Liberal Democrats			
Liberal Democrats hold			
