= 2007 Ashfield District Council election =

2007 UK local government election

Map of the results of the 2007 Ashfield council election. Independents in grey, Labour in red, Liberal Democrats in yellow and Conservatives in blue.

The 2007 Ashfield District Council election took place on 3 May 2007 to elect members of Ashfield District Council in Nottinghamshire, England. The whole council was up for election and the Labour Party lost overall control of the council to no overall control.

== Election result ==
The results saw Labour lose their majority on the council, after a net loss of 8 seats saw them reduced to 9 councillors. Among the defeated Labour councillors were 2 members of the cabinet, Jessie Parker in Sutton-in-Ashfield North and Stephen Mays in Underwood. There were 12 independent councillors elected, but it was the Liberal Democrats who made big progress, gaining 8 seats to move level with Labour on 9 seats. One of the Liberal Democrat winners, Helen Smith, became one of the youngest councillors in the country at the age of 19 after gaining a seat in Woodhouse ward.

Ashfield local election result 2007
Party	Seats	Gains	Losses	Net gain/loss	Seats %	Votes %	Votes	+/−
Independent	12	2	3	-1	36.4	27.7	17,694	-7.1%
Labour	9	2	10	-8	27.3	28.6	18,262	-23.4%
Liberal Democrats	9	8	0	+8	27.3	25.3	16,177	+25.3%
Conservative	3	3	0	+3	9.1	12.6	8,083	+5.3%
BNP	0	0	0	0	0	3.1	1,990	+3.1%
Green	0	0	2	-2	0	2.0	1,308	-2.5%
UKIP	0	0	0	0	0	0.5	349	+0.5%
English Democrat	0	0	0	0	0	0.1	78	+0.1%

== Ward results ==
Hucknall Central (2)
Party	Candidate	Votes	%	±%
Independent	Robert Spray	1,056		
Conservative	Gordon Riley	879		
Labour	Trevor Locke	602		
Labour	Keith Northeast	592		
Liberal Democrats	Jean Toseland	396		
Liberal Democrats	Bernard Briggs	244		
Turnout		3,769		
Independent gain from Labour		Swing		
Conservative gain from Labour		Swing		

Hucknall East (2)
Party	Candidate	Votes	%	±%
Conservative	Robert Rankin	744		
Labour	David Shaw	528		
Labour	Geoffrey Thorpe	504		
Green	Timothy Welton	484		
UKIP	Albert Inskip	349		
Liberal Democrats	Tim Jones	178		
Green	David Lowe	176		
Liberal Democrats	Rebecca Mullaney	168		
Turnout		3,131		
Conservative gain from Labour		Swing		
Labour hold		Swing		

Hucknall North (2)
Party	Candidate	Votes	%	±%
Conservative	John Dymock	673		
Labour	John Wilmott	666		
Conservative	Robert Copley	644		
Independent	Robert Gow	542		
Labour	David Hughes	521		
Liberal Democrats	David Haworth	372		
Liberal Democrats	Nicole Knight	337		
Turnout		3,755		
Conservative gain from Independent		Swing		
Labour hold		Swing		

Hucknall West (3)
Party	Candidate	Votes	%	±%
Liberal Democrats	Austin Rathe	1,281		
Liberal Democrats	Harry Toseland	1,236		
Liberal Democrats	Louise Bradshaw	1,103		
Conservative	Kevin Rostance	901		
Conservative	Rodney Allen	786		
Labour	James Blagden	533		
Labour	Ian Briggs	497		
Labour	Mireille Hughes	464		
BNP	Susan Gamble	330		
Turnout		7,131		
Liberal Democrats hold		Swing		
Liberal Democrats gain from Labour		Swing		
Liberal Democrats gain from Labour		Swing		

Jacksdale
Party	Candidate	Votes	%	±%
Labour	Elizabeth Mays	368	46.5	−29.7
Independent	Clifford Perry	231	29.2	+5.4
BNP	Darran Burke	192	24.3	+24.3
Majority		137	17.3	−35.0
Turnout		791		
Labour hold		Swing		

Kirkby-in-Ashfield Central (2)
Party	Candidate	Votes	%	±%
Independent	Rachel Madden	774		
Independent	Antony Brown	703		
Labour	Alan Howlett	672		
BNP	Trevor Bradford	534		
Independent	Paul Rockley	525		
Turnout		3,208		
Independent hold		Swing		
Independent hold		Swing		

Kirkby-in-Ashfield East (2)
Party	Candidate	Votes	%	±%
Independent	Wendy Harvey	784		
Labour	Warren Nuttall	405		
BNP	Paul Gamble	383		
Independent	Harald Greasley	369		
Labour	Beverly Meszaros	334		
Independent	Linda Barsby	281		
Independent	Terry Sadler	174		
Turnout		2,730		
Independent hold		Swing		
Labour gain from Independent		Swing		

Kirkby-in-Ashfield West (2)
Party	Candidate	Votes	%	±%
Independent	John Baird	861		
Labour	John Knight	472		
BNP	Michael Clarke	372		
Independent	David Spalding	348		
Liberal Democrats	Linda Mullaney	250		
Independent	Sheila Humphreys	232		
Liberal Democrats	Victoria Zadrozny	177		
Turnout		2,712		
Independent hold		Swing		
Labour gain from Independent		Swing		

Selston (2)
Party	Candidate	Votes	%	±%
Selston Area Independents Putting People First	Beverley Turner	1,402	42.8	
Selston Area Independents Putting People First	Samuel Wilson	1,114	34.0	
Labour	Edward Llewellyn-Jones	391	11.9	
Independent	David Sewell	366	11.2	
Turnout		3,273		
Independent hold		Swing		
Independent hold		Swing		

Sutton-In-Ashfield Central (3)
Party	Candidate	Votes	%	±%
Labour	John Bulmer	1,040		
Labour	Margaret Thorpe	979		
Labour	Christine Wakefield	919		
Independent	John Ross	753		
Conservative	Sylvia Baker	642		
Liberal Democrats	Carol Knight	633		
Conservative	Christine Vernon	595		
Liberal Democrats	Richard Zadrozny	536		
Turnout		6,097		
Labour hold		Swing		
Labour hold		Swing		
Labour hold		Swing		

Sutton-In-Ashfield East (3)
Party	Candidate	Votes	%	±%
Independent	Anthony Wallis	996		
Independent	David Parker	978		
Labour	May Barsby	975		
Labour	Steven Carroll	915		
Labour	Kier Barsby	868		
Conservative	Mavis Allen	739		
Liberal Democrats	Louise Mitchell	713		
Liberal Democrats	Brenda Zadrozny	460		
Turnout		6,644		
Independent gain from Labour		Swing		
Independent hold		Swing		
Labour hold		Swing		

Sutton-In-Ashfield North (3)
Party	Candidate	Votes	%	±%
Liberal Democrats	Jason Zadrozny	2,094		
Liberal Democrats	Lee Cooper	1,920		
Liberal Democrats	Michael Mullaney	1,757		
Labour	Ivan Pitchford	536		
Labour	Melanie Darrington	508		
Labour	Jessie Parker	506		
Conservative	John Baker	329		
Conservative	Michael Halls	313		
Independent	Alfred Thorpe	230		
Conservative	Eugene Di Villa	219		
Turnout		8,412		
Liberal Democrats gain from Labour		Swing		
Liberal Democrats gain from Labour		Swing		
Liberal Democrats gain from Labour		Swing		

Sutton-In-Ashfield West (3)
Party	Candidate	Votes	%	±%
Independent	Ramon Buttery	1,359		
Independent	Roy Adkins	1,119		
Independent	Diane Lowe	1,006		
Independent	David Shooter	845		
Labour	Christine Kirkham	748		
Labour	Terence Keetley	747		
Labour	Ian Stokes	644		
Conservative	Peter Thorpe	619		
Turnout		7,087		
Independent hold		Swing		
Independent hold		Swing		
Independent hold		Swing		

Underwood
Party	Candidate	Votes	%	±%
Liberal Democrats	Robert Sears-Piccavey	538	48.5	
Labour	Stephen Mays	206	18.6	
BNP	Jane Clarke	179	16.1	
Independent	Diane Doran	109	9.8	
English Democrat	Anthony Ellis	78	7.0	
Majority		332	29.9	
Turnout		1,110		
Liberal Democrats gain from Labour		Swing		

Woodhouse (2)
Party	Candidate	Votes	%	±%
Liberal Democrats	Tony Theaker	964		
Liberal Democrats	Helen Smith	820		
Labour	Pamela Lewis	572		
Labour	Linda Ward	550		
Green	Mark Harrison	351		
Green	Ann Hilton	297		
Independent	Petro Clarke	295		
Independent	Glenn Baird	242		
Turnout		4,091		
Liberal Democrats gain from Green		Swing		
Liberal Democrats gain from Green		Swing		
