= Katarzyna Walter =

Polish actress

- Born: Katarzyna Walter; February 23, 1960 (age 65); Kraków, Poland
- Occupation: Actress
- Years active: from 1983

Katarzyna Walter (born 23 February 1960) is a Polish actress.

In 1983 she graduated from the Academy of Dramatic Arts in Wrocław. She performed at the Contemporary Theatre in Wrocław from 1983–1984 and then at the Studio Theatre in Warsaw from 1984–1990.

She has also been credited as Katarzyna Zadrożny, Katarzyna Walter-Sakowitch, and Ewa Zadrożna.

== Dancing with the Stars ==
She participated in the eighth edition of Dancing with the Stars. Her partner was Krzysztof Hulboj, with whom she placed 11th.

== Filmography ==
- 2007 : On the Common, as Agnes Olszewska
- 2006-2007 : Hela out on a limb episode. 3 and 23, as Bozena
- 2006 : Magda M. episode. 17-18, as Barbara Janicka
- 2006 : You'll be mine, as Dagmar
- 2005 : The good and the bad episode. 221, as Natalia Hertman
- 2005 : Boston Legal episode. 17, as head of an advertising agency
- 2005 : Guardian Angel Episode. 3 and 5, as Dominic
- 2004-2006 : Breakfast at the Rose, as Alice Bird
- 2004 : Out of range, as Madame Konya
- 2004 : Cesar hollow episode. 4, as Mary Holy Cross
- 2003 : Neighbours episode. 25, as Miranda Okhotsk
- 2003 : Residents episode. 150, as the bark Wine
- 1997 : Spellbinder: Land of the Dragon Lord as Guin (episode 11-15)
- 1994 : Death in shallow water, as Martha
- 1993 : The New Adventures of Arsene Lupin, as Natasha
- 1992 : Republic of Dreams ( der Republik trauma ), as Dorothy
- 1991 : Long live love, as Natalia Brońska (uncredited as Catherine Walter-Sakowitch)
- 1990 : Talking about love, as Eve
- 1990 : Stone mystery, as Joanna
- 1990 : Femina, a prostitute in front of the hotel
- 1990 : Prominent, as the wife of the Mountain
- 1990 : Armelle
- 1988 : Error in account, as Dorota Milewicz
- 1987 : The eleventh commandment, as Maria
- 1985 : Season for pheasants
- 1985 : The freedom, as Ula Malak
- 1985 : I Like Bats, as Iza
- 1984 : Idol, as a girl Soltan (uncredited as Zadrożna)
- 1981 : 07 report the episode. 10-11, as secretary of Major Wołczyk
