= Andriy Zadorozhny =

Ukrainian lawyer

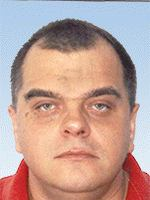
Andriy Viktorovych Zadorozhny

Andriy Viktorovych Zadorozhny (born 21 May 1968 in Kyiv, Soviet Union) is a Ukrainian lawyer and human rights activist. People's Deputy of Ukraine of the 9th convocation from the Servant of the People.

== Biography ==
Candidate for People's Deputies from the Servant of the People party in the 2019 parliamentary elections, № 119 on the list. At the time of the election: Director of Proxen Law Firm, non-partisan, living in Kyiv.

He graduated from the Faculty of International Law at the Institute of International Relations of the Taras Shevchenko National University of Kyiv, obtained the qualification of an international lawyer and English translator.

Member of the Verkhovna Rada of Ukraine Committee on Environmental Policy and Nature Management.

== Link ==
Zadorozhny Andriy on Facebook.
