= 1999 Ashfield District Council election =

1999 UK local government election

The 1999 Ashfield District Council election took place on 6 May 1999 to elect members of Ashfield District Council in Nottinghamshire, England. The whole council was up for election and the Labour party stayed in overall control of the council.

== Election result ==
Ashfield local election result 1999
Party	Seats	Gains	Losses	Net gain/loss	Seats %	Votes %	Votes	+/−
Labour	29			-4	87.9			
Independent	2			+2	6.1			
Conservative	1			+1	3.0			
Liberal Democrats	1			+1	3.0			
