= Ashfield Independents =

Political party in Ashfield, Nottinghamshire

- Leader: Helen Smith
- Treasurer: Thomas Hollis
- Founded: 28 July 2016; 10 years ago
- Headquarters: 84–86 Outram Street, Sutton-in-Ashfield, Nottinghamshire, NG17 4FS
- Ashfield District Council: 18 / 35
- Nottinghamshire County Council: 0 / 66
- Councils Controlled: 1 / 317

Website
- ashfieldindependents.org

The Ashfield Independents are a political party founded in 2016 in Ashfield District in Nottinghamshire, England by former Liberal Democrat leader of the council Jason Zadrozny. Zadrozny became leader of the council for Ashfield Independents in 2018; the party has formed the administration on the council since 2019 and came second in the 2019 General Election. Their councillors have faced several legal investigations.

== Electoral history ==
The party was founded in 2016 by former Liberal Democrat council leader Jason Zadrozny, with no whip and members coming from several other political parties and independents. (Note: A previous party of the same name was registered 2005-08 and stood in the 2005 General Election. https://search.electoralcommission.org.uk/api/pdf/Registrations/PP450) In 2017, the Ashfield Independents stood candidates in the Nottinghamshire County Council elections. They won five seats.

A month later, Gail Turner ran for the party in the 2017 general election and gained 9.2% of the vote with 4,612 votes, receiving the second-highest vote share of an independent candidate in England; however, Labour retained the seat.

The party won two by-elections to Ashfield District Council in 2017 and 2018 in the Hucknall North and Sutton Junction & Harlow Wood wards. In April 2018, following the resignation of eight Labour councillors, Labour leader of the council Cheryl Butler lost a vote of no confidence and she was replaced by Zadrozny, with no overall control.

In 2019, the party stood candidates across Ashfield District Council and won 30 of the 35 seats, up 18 councillors and taking overall control of the authority following "an anti-party election campaign". The party said they spoke to 75,000 of the 120,000 residents of Ashfield and benefitted from the Labour MP "flip-flopping" about Brexit, in a high Leave voting area. The party also stood candidates in the neighbouring Broxtowe Borough Council, winning a single seat. In addition the party won control of Annesley and Felley Parish Council. In the same elections elsewhere in Nottinghamshire, Nottingham Independents became the second-largest party on the city council.

In July 2019, party leader Jason Zadrozny announced that he would be a candidate for the Ashfield constituency when the next general election was held. A former staff member of Labour's Gloria De Piero defected and the party was the bookmakers' favourite. The election came in December 2019 and Zadrozny came second with 27.6% of the vote.

In the 2021 local elections across the UK, the party won an increased 11 seats on Nottinghamshire County Council, winning every seat in the Ashfield District.

in the 2023 Ashfield District Council election, the party increased their majority by two seats on the Ashfield District Council, taking a seat each off of the Tories and Labour, for a total seat count of 32. They also retained Kirkby South in a county council by-election after their previous councillor resigned for personal reasons.

In the 2024 United Kingdom general election, Zadrozny again ran in the Ashfield constituency and came third with a reduced vote share of 15.7%.

At the 2025 Nottinghamshire County Council election, the party lost all but one of their ten seats to Reform. Councillor Kier Barsby resigned from the party in January 2026 to sit unaligned on the district council, citing concern about the council being brought into disrepute. Zadrozny announced in May 2026 that he will retire from politics when his term ends in 2028.

=== Elected councillors ===
==== Ashfield District Council ====
There are 35 councillors in the Ashfield District Council, 30 of whom are members of the Ashfield Independents, as of 22 September 2026. Councillor Dave Hennigan was elected in 2019 as an Ashfield Independent, but was expelled in May 2020 after disagreements with the rest of the party.

Councillor	Ward
John Baird	Summit
Kier Barsby (Note: Resigned from the party in January 2026)	St Mary's
Jim Blagden	Hucknall Central
Christian Chapman	Jacksdale
Samantha Deakin	Central & New Cross
Dale Grounds	Kingsway
Arnie Hankin	Selston
Andrew Harding	Huthwaite & Brierley
Tom Hollis	Huthwaite & Brierley
Trevor Locke	Hucknall Central
Rachel Madden	Kirkby Woodhouse
Sarah Madigan	Leamington
Andy Meakin	Abbey Hill
Warren Nuttall	Summit
Matthew Relf	Sutton Junction & Harlow Wood
Dave Shaw	Hucknall North
John Smallridge	Carsic
Helen-Ann Smith	Stanton Hill & Teversal
David Walters	Ashfields
Lee Waters	Hucknall North
Caroline Wilkinson	The Dales
Daniel Williamson	Kirkby Cross & Portland
John Wilmott	Hucknall North

==== Broxtowe Borough Council ====
There was one councillor on Broxtowe Borough Council who is a member of the Ashfield Independents:

Councillor	Ward
Elizabeth Williamson	Brinsley

==== Nottinghamshire County Council ====
As of the 2025 County Council elections, the Ashfield Independents have just one 1 councillor on Nottinghamshire County Council (John Wilmott, Hucknall North), down from 10.

=== General elections ===
Election	Candidate	Total votes	%	% in contest seat	Place in Ashfield
2017	Gail Turner	4,612	0.0%	9.2%	3rd
2019	Jason Zadrozny	13,498	0.1%	27.6%	2nd
2024	Jason Zadrozny	6,276	0.0%	15.7%	3rd

== Charges of fraud, election offences and misconduct in public office ==
In November 2022, Zadrozny and five other Ashfield Independent Councillors were arrested for fraud, election offences, money laundering and misconduct in public office.

On 23 June 2023, Zadrozny was charged with 22 offences including 12 counts of fraud by false representation, five counts of money laundering, four counts of tax evasion, and possession of cocaine.

The fraud by false representation charges relate to the alleged misuse of Nottinghamshire County Council funds between 14 February 2018 and 16 February 2021.

As part of the same investigation, Tom Hollis was charged with two offences for allegedly failing to declare his disclosable pecuniary interest in a property, between 30 May 2019 and 10 September 2021. A spokesperson for the Ashfield Independents said both Zadrozny and Hollis "absolutely deny" the charges and "look forward to clearing their name". Hollis subsequently pleaded guilty.

On 21 September 2026, Zadrozny was found guilty of nine counts of fraud and four of tax evasion.

David Martin was amongst the Councillors arrested in November 2022. Whilst Martin was not charged in relation to the offences he was initially arrested for, he was charged with assaulting a police officer during his arrest. Martin chose to have his case heard in front of a jury at Crown Court. He initially pleaded not guilty at a pre-trial hearing, but changed his plea to guilty on 24 September 2024.

In 2017, Zadrozny appeared before Nottingham Crown Court charged with child sex allegations. The Crown Prosecution Service offered no evidence and the charges were dismissed.

== See also ==
- Broxtowe Alliance
- Nottingham Independents
- Nottingham People's Alliance
- Ashfield District Council elections
- Ashfield (UK Parliament constituency)
