= 2019 Ashfield District Council election =

2019 UK local government election

- 2 May 2019

All 35 seats to Ashfield District Council 18 seats needed for a majority
	First party	Second party	Third party
	AI	Con	Lab
Leader	Jason Zadrozny	Kevin Rostance	Cheryl Butler
Party	Ashfield Ind.	Conservative	Labour
Leader's seat	Larwood	Hucknall West	Kirkby Cross & Portland (defeated)
Last election	0	4	22
Seats won	30	3	2
Seat change	▲30	▼1	▼20
- Map of the results of the election. Colours denote the winning party, as shown in the main table of results.
Council control before election
No overall control
Council control after election
Ashfield Independents

The 2019 Ashfield District Council election took place on 2 May 2019, to elect all members of Ashfield District Council in England.

The election resulted in the Ashfield Independents gaining control of the council with a large majority, winning 30 of the 35 seats up for election. The Labour Party suffered heavy losses, winning just 2 seats, a decrease of 20 compared with the last election in 2015.

== Overall election results ==
=== Ashfield District Council (Summary of Overall Results) ===
Within Ashfield District Council 2019
Party	Candidates						Votes		
Party	Stood	Elected	Gained	Unseated	Net	% of total	%	No.	Net %
Ashfield Ind.	35	30	30	0	+26		64.6	39,245	
Labour	35	2	0	20	-20		18.2	11,066	
Conservative	35	3	0	1	-1		11.2	6,798	
Independent	4	0	0	4	0		3.2	1,922	
UKIP	6	0	0	0	0		1.4	822	
Liberal Democrats	3	0	0	5	-5		1.2	736	
Green	2	0	0	0	0		0.2	139	

== Ashfield District Council - Results by Ward ==
=== Abbey Hill ===
Abbey Hill (1)
Party	Candidate	Votes	%	±%
Ashfield Ind.	Andy Meakin	706	73.2	+50
Labour	Christopher Michael Murphy	176	18.2	−17
UKIP	Moira Jean Sansom	62	6.4	−15
Conservative	Dale Saddington	21	2.2	−12
Registered electors		2,421		
Rejected ballots		1	0.1	
Turnout		966	39.9	
Ashfield Ind. gain from Labour		Swing		

=== Annesley & Kirkby Woodhouse ===
Annesley & Kirkby Woodhouse (2)
Party	Candidate	Votes	%	±%
Ashfield Ind.	Rachel Elisabeth Madden*	1,894	75.0	+33
Ashfield Ind.	Ciaran Richard Brown	1,642	65.1	N/A
Labour	Don Davis*	410	16.2	−20
Labour	Roo Stevens	328	13.0	−19
UKIP	Glyn Street	185	7.3	−20
Conservative	Paul Anthony Bedford	113	4.5	N/A
Conservative	Tom Clark	101	4.0	N/A
Registered electors		5,838		
Rejected ballots		12	0.5	
Turnout		2524	43.2	
Ashfield Ind. gain from Labour		Swing		
Ashfield Ind. gain from Liberal Democrats				

=== Ashfields ===
Ashfields (1)
Party	Candidate	Votes	%	±%
Ashfield Ind.	David Thomas Walters	970	83.2	N/A
Labour	Damian John Darby	113	9.7	−16
Conservative	Andrew Mark Abele	83	7.1	−7
Registered electors		2,972		
Rejected ballots		8	0.7	
Turnout		1174	39.5	
Ashfield Ind. gain from Liberal Democrats		Swing		

=== Carsic ===
Carsic (1)
Party	Candidate	Votes	%	±%
Ashfield Ind.	John Frederick Smallridge	708	72.3	N/A
Labour	Cathy Mason*	241	24.6	−38
Conservative	John Dobson	30	3.1	−13
Registered electors		2,743		
Rejected ballots		9	0.9	
Turnout		984	35.9	
Ashfield Ind. gain from Labour		Swing		

=== Sutton Central & New Cross ===
Sutton Central & New Cross (2)
Party	Candidate	Votes	%	±%
Ashfield Ind.	Samantha Kay Deakin	1,371	80.3	+55
Ashfield Ind.	David Lawrence Hennigan	1,188	69.6	N/A
Labour	Marty Everett	249	14.6	−31
Labour	Crystal Jane Parker	227	13.3	−30
Green	Arran Rangi	84	4.9	N/A
Conservative	Nicholas Felton	62	3.6	N/A
Conservative	Mark Richard Simons	51	3.0	N/A
Registered electors		5,539		
Rejected ballots		9	0.5	
Turnout		1708	30.8	
Ashfield Ind. gain from Labour		Swing		
Ashfield Ind. gain from Labour		Swing		

=== Hucknall Central ===
Hucknall Central (2)
Party	Candidate	Votes	%	±%
Ashfield Ind.	Trevor Charles Locke	690	38.0	N/A
Ashfield Ind.	Jim Blagden	671	37.0	+30
Labour	John Hartley Wilkinson	559	30.8	−10
Labour	Nicolle Ndiweni*	540	29.8	−6
Conservative	Trevor Ronald Peat	356	19.6	−8
Conservative	Liz Kelly	297	16.4	−3
UKIP	Jack Holland	279	15.4	−11
Registered electors		5,542		
Rejected ballots		9	0.5	
Turnout		1814	32.7	
Ashfield Ind. gain from Labour				
Ashfield Ind. gain from Labour				

=== Hucknall North ===
Hucknall North (3)
Party	Candidate	Votes	%	±%
Ashfield Ind.	John Anthony Wilmott*	2,011	64.7	+50
Ashfield Ind.	Lee Waters	1,879	60.5	N/A
Ashfield Ind.	Dave Shaw	1,869	60.2	N/A
Labour	Alice Elisabeth Grice	619	19.9	−15
Labour	Nat Mason	557	17.9	−12
Labour	Natalie Rachael Bryan	539	17.3	−12
Liberal Democrats	Vicki Charlton	309	9.9	N/A
Conservative	Cathryn Georgina Rostance	281	9.0	−27
Liberal Democrats	James Alan Harvey	231	7.4	N/A
Conservative	David Stephen Randall	216	7.0	−26
Liberal Democrats	Martin Alan Howes	196	6.3	N/A
Conservative	Maria Stojak	192	6.2	−24
Registered electors		7,985		
Rejected ballots		12	0.4	
Turnout		3107	38.9	
Ashfield Ind. gain from Conservative		Swing		
Ashfield Ind. gain from Conservative				
Ashfield Ind. gain from Labour				

=== Hucknall South ===
Hucknall South (2)
Party	Candidate	Votes	%	±%
Labour	Lauren Amber Mitchell*	642	37.8	−4
Labour	Keir Alexander Morrison*	606	35.6	−
Conservative	Jan Lees	526	30.9	+1
Conservative	Brian Anthony Willows	496	29.2	−1
Ashfield Ind.	Ben John Tomlinson	470	27.6	N/A
Ashfield Ind.	Jean Rose Toseland	461	27.1	N/A
Registered electors		5,596		
Rejected ballots		18	1.1	
Turnout		1700	30.4	
Labour hold		Swing		
Labour hold		Swing		

=== Hucknall West ===
Hucknall West (3)
Party	Candidate	Votes	%	±%
Conservative	Kevin Thomas Rostance*	1,043	43.6	+6
Conservative	Phil Rostance*	1,031	43.1	+8
Conservative	Chris Baron*	831	34.8	−1
Ashfield Ind.	Rachael Clarke	691	28.9	N/A
Ashfield Ind.	Nicole Charlotte Paylor	653	27.3	N/A
Labour	Patrick Stephen Ayres	642	26.9	−9
Ashfield Ind.	Gordon Kenneth Mann	610	25.5	N/A
Labour	Louise Margaret Cooke	603	25.2	−8
Labour	Ian Morrison	600	25.1	−8
Registered electors		7,409		
Rejected ballots		28	1.2	
Turnout		2390	32.3	
Conservative hold		Swing		
Conservative hold		Swing		
Conservative hold		Swing		

=== Huthwaite & Brierley ===
Huthwaite & Brierley (2)
Party	Candidate	Votes	%	±%
Ashfield Ind.	Tom Hollis	1,933	81.0	N/A
Ashfield Ind.	Andrew Richard Harding	1,832	76.7	N/A
Labour	Ali Lakin	318	13.3	−22
Labour	Lee Michael Holland	285	11.9	−22
Conservative	Jeff Self	100	4.2	−17
Conservative	Adam Kevin Rostance	74	3.1	N/A
Registered electors		5,719		
Rejected ballots		13	0.5	
Turnout		2387	41.7	
Ashfield Ind. gain from Labour		Swing		
Ashfield Ind. gain from Labour		Swing		

=== Jacksdale & Westwood ===
Jacksdale & Westwood (1)
Party	Candidate	Votes	%	±%
Ashfield Ind.	Christian Richard Chapman*	929	82.0	+47
UKIP	Ray Young	94	8.3	N/A
Labour	Debbie Roe	82	7.2	−27
Conservative	Daniel James Alletson	28	2.5	N/A
Registered electors		2,594		
Rejected ballots		2	0.2	
Turnout		1135	43.8	
Ashfield Ind. gain from Liberal Democrats		Swing		

=== Kingsway ===
Kingsway (1)
Party	Candidate	Votes	%	±%
Ashfield Ind.	Dale Anthony Grounds	763	72.2	N/A
Labour Co-op	Mike Smith*	162	15.3	−35
UKIP	Catheryn Elizabeth Howells	82	7.8	N/A
Conservative	Gemma Lucy Rudge	50	4.7	N/A
Registered electors		2,387		
Rejected ballots		4	0.4	
Turnout		1061	44.4	
Ashfield Ind. gain from Labour		Swing		

=== Kirkby Cross & Portland ===
Kirkby Cross & Portland (1)
Party	Candidate	Votes	%	±%
Ashfield Ind.	Daniel Frederick Williamson	1,026	73.2	N/A
Labour	Cheryl Butler*	308	22.0	−17
Conservative	Derrick Joseph Hart	68	4.9	N/A
Registered electors		3,144		
Turnout		1402	44.6	
Ashfield Ind. gain from Labour		Swing		

=== Larwood ===
Larwood (1)
Party	Candidate	Votes	%	±%
Ashfield Ind.	Jason Zadrozny*	993	81.3	+34
Labour	David Kenneth Warwick	161	13.2	−14
Conservative	Paul Andrew Sheridan	68	5.6	−8
Registered electors		2,934		
Rejected ballots		6	0.5	
Turnout		1229	41.9	
Ashfield Ind. gain from Independent		Swing		

=== Leamington ===
Leamington (1)
Party	Candidate	Votes	%	±%
Ashfield Ind.	Sarah Jayne Madigan	712	72.2	N/A
Labour	David Jonathan Griffiths*	184	18.7	−51
Independent	Tony Wallis	55	5.6	N/A
Conservative	Paul Adam Bailey	35	3.5	N/A
Registered electors		2,822		
Rejected ballots		6	0.6	
Turnout		992	35.2	
Ashfield Ind. gain from Labour		Swing		

=== Selston ===
Selston (2)
Party	Candidate	Votes	%	±%
Ashfield Ind.	Andy Gascoyne	1,216	55.4	N/A
Ashfield Ind.	Arnie Hankin	1,169	53.3	N/A
Independent	Sam Wilson*	818	37.3	−8
Independent	Emma Olden	670	30.6	N/A
Labour	Stuart William Jackson	154	7.0	−12
Labour	Pam Lewis	116	5.3	−13
Conservative	Rebecca Sarah Hughes	91	4.1	N/A
Conservative	Millie Warren	54	2.5	N/A
Registered electors		5,022		
Rejected ballots		8	0.4	
Turnout		2193	43.7	
Ashfield Ind. gain from Independent		Swing		
Ashfield Ind. gain from Independent				

=== Skegby ===
Skegby (2)
Party	Candidate	Votes	%	±%
Ashfield Ind.	Melanie Jane Darrington	1,629	78.2	N/A
Ashfield Ind.	Anthony Neil Brewer*	1,619	77.7	+44
Labour	Bea Evans-Braddow	290	13.9	−14
Labour	Paul Roberts*	255	12.2	−17
Conservative	Keith Lewis Broughton	93	4.5	N/A
Conservative	Daniel Yates	54	2.6	N/A
Registered electors		5,221		
Rejected ballots		5	0.2	
Turnout		2084	39.9	
Ashfield Ind. gain from Labour		Swing		
Ashfield Ind. gain from Liberal Democrats				

=== Sutton St Mary's ===
Sutton St Mary's (1)
Party	Candidate	Votes	%	±%
Ashfield Ind.	Kier Barsby	941	78.1	N/A
Labour	William Russell Booth	211	17.5	−18
Conservative	Shaun Alan Flowers	53	4.4	−11
Registered electors		2,878		
Rejected ballots		4	0.3	
Turnout		1209	42.0	
Ashfield Ind. gain from Labour		Swing		

=== Stanton Hill & Teversal ===
Stanton Hill & Teversal (1)
Party	Candidate	Votes	%	±%
Ashfield Ind.	Helen-Ann Smith*	726	82.5	+40
Labour	Linford Martyn Gibbons	108	12.3	−20
Conservative	Remi Bambo	46	5.2	N/A
Registered electors		2,499		
Rejected ballots		6	0.7	
Turnout		886	35.5	
Ashfield Ind. gain from Liberal Democrats		Swing		

=== Greenwood & Summit ===
Greenwood & Summit (2)
Party	Candidate	Votes	%	±%
Ashfield Ind.	John Baird	1,472	79.1	+56
Ashfield Ind.	Warren Thomas Nuttall	1,302	70.0	N/A
Labour	Donna Samantha Jane Gilbert	260	14.0	−28
Labour	John Russell Knight*	250	13.4	−29
UKIP	Janet Jeanes	120	6.5	−24
Conservative	Lee Stuart Bradbury	39	2.1	N/A
Conservative	Karen Simons	33	1.8	N/A
Registered electors		5,063		
Rejected ballots		6	0.3	
Turnout		1860	36.7	
Ashfield Ind. gain from Labour		Swing		
Ashfield Ind. gain from Labour		Swing		

=== Sutton Junction & Harlow Wood ===
Sutton Junction & Harlow Wood (1)
Party	Candidate	Votes	%	±%
Ashfield Ind.	Matthew James Relf	1,007	88.0	N/A
Labour	Kevin Allan Ball	104	9.1	−29
Conservative	Leslie Norman Boyington	33	2.9	N/A
Registered electors		2,754		
Rejected ballots		3	0.3	
Turnout		1147	41.6	
Ashfield Ind. gain from Labour		Swing		

=== The Dales ===
The Dales (1)
Party	Candidate	Votes	%	±%
Ashfield Ind.	Caroline Louise Wilkinson	794	82.6	N/A
Labour	Sinead Emily Causer	115	12.0	−39
Conservative	Christine Jennifer Self	52	5.4	N/A
Registered electors		2,382		
Rejected ballots		1	0.1	
Turnout		962	40.4	
Ashfield Ind. gain from Labour		Swing		

=== Underwood ===
Underwood (1)
Party	Candidate	Votes	%	±%
Ashfield Ind.	David Bernard Martin	698	54.5	N/A
Independent	Dawn Justice	379	29.6	N/A
Conservative	Dawn Hodgman	97	7.6	−10
Green	Simon Philip Towle	55	4.3	N/A
Labour	Tracy Sowter	52	4.1	−13
Registered electors		2,695		
Rejected ballots		6	0.5	
Turnout		1287	47.8	
Ashfield Ind. gain from Independent		Swing		

== Changes 2019–2023 ==
- 27 May 2020: David Hennigan (Sutton Central & New Cross) left the Ashfield Independents group "by mutual consent", while remaining a councillor.
- Melanie Darrington (Skegby) left the Ashfield Independents group to sit as an independent councillor during the term.
- November 2022: council leader Jason Zadrozny and five other Ashfield Independent councillors were arrested by Nottinghamshire Police on suspicion of fraud, money laundering and misconduct in public office; all six were released under investigation. In June 2023 Zadrozny and deputy leader Tom Hollis were among those charged: Zadrozny with 22 offences, comprising 12 counts of fraud by false representation, five counts of money laundering, four counts of income tax evasion and one count of possessing a Class A drug, and Hollis with two counts of failing to declare a pecuniary interest. Zadrozny pleaded not guilty to all charges at Nottingham Magistrates' Court on 21 July 2023. Hollis was fined in February 2024. Zadrozny's trial, delayed from an original February 2025 date, was confirmed for 24 August 2026 at Northampton Crown Court.

=== By-elections ===
==== Annesley & Kirkby Woodhouse ====
Annesley & Kirkby Woodhouse: 6 May 2021
Party	Candidate	Votes	%	±%
Ashfield Ind.	Jamie Bell	1,630	74.9	
Labour	Perry Woodhouse	547	25.1	
Majority		1,083	49.8	
Registered electors		5,807		
Rejected ballots		44	2.0	
Turnout		2,221	38.2	
Ashfield Ind. hold		Swing		

The by-election was triggered by the resignation of the sitting councillor, Ciaran Richard Brown.

==== Skegby ====
Skegby: 6 May 2021
Party	Candidate	Votes	%	±%
Ashfield Ind.	Will Bostock	1,137	60.7	
Conservative	Sam Howlett	426	22.7	
Labour	Joanne Booker-Varley	310	16.6	
Majority		711	38.0	
Registered electors		5,194		
Rejected ballots		7	0.4	
Turnout		1,880	36.2	
Ashfield Ind. hold		Swing		

The by-election was triggered by the death of the sitting councillor, Anthony Neil Brewer, who died on 7 April 2020 after contracting COVID-19; the poll itself was delayed by over a year by the nationwide suspension of English local by-elections during the coronavirus pandemic before being held alongside the rest of the postponed May 2020 election cycle on 6 May 2021.

==== Hucknall Central ====
Hucknall Central: 23 November 2022
Party	Candidate	Votes	%	±%
Ashfield Ind.	Nicholas Brian Richard Parvin	710	54.5	
Labour	John Hartley Wilkinson	397	30.5	
Conservative	Janine Carol Lees	195	15.0	
Majority		313	24.0	
Registered electors		5,538		
Rejected ballots		5	0.4	
Turnout		1,307	23.6	
Ashfield Ind. hold		Swing		

The by-election was triggered by the death of the sitting councillor, Jim Blagden, who died on 31 July 2022 after being diagnosed with cancer.
