= Jason Zadrozny =

British politician (born 1980)

Cllr Jason Zadrozny

Leader of Ashfield District Council
- In office 26 Apr 2018 – 22 September 2026
- Preceded by: Cheryl Butler
- Succeeded by: Samantha Deakin
- In office 3 May 2007 – 7 May 2009
- Preceded by: Ken Creed
- Succeeded by: John Knight

Ashfield Independents Group Leader on Ashfield District Council
- In office 28 July 2016 – 22 September 2026
- Preceded by: Office established

Councillor for Ashfield District Council
- In office 22 March 2007 – 12 November 2026
- Ward: Larwood

Personal details
- Born: Jason Bernard Zadrozny; 20 July 1980 (age 46) Sutton-in-Ashfield, Nottinghamshire, England
- Party: Ashfield Independents (2016-2026)
- Other political affiliations: Liberal Democrats (until 2015)
- Occupation: Politician

Jason Bernard Zadrozny (born 20 July 1980) is a British local politician and convicted fraudster who was the leader of the Ashfield Independents from 2016 to 2026 and Leader of Ashfield District Council from 2018 to 2026.

In 2007, he first became Leader of the Council as a Liberal Democrat, becoming the youngest council leader in the United Kingdom at that time, aged 26. Labour took back control at elections in 2009, but in 2018 Zadrozny regained the position as an Ashfield Independent.

== Early life ==
Zadrozny was born in Sutton-in-Ashfield, Nottinghamshire and is of Polish descent. He grew up in Kirkby-in-Ashfield attending Greenwood Primary School, Ashfield Comprehensive School, and West Nottinghamshire College, where he completed a BTeC National Diploma in Performance Art. He then obtained a Higher National Diploma in Theatre Studies from the college in 2002.

== Political career ==
In March 2007, standing as a Liberal Democrat, Zadrozny won a by-election to Nottinghamshire County Council in the Sutton-in-Ashfield North division, with a 44 percent swing to his party and a 60 percent increase in the vote share. Two months later, also in Sutton-in-Ashfield North, he won a seat on Ashfield District Council, and the Liberal Democrats became the largest party.

Zadrozny was then Leader of Ashfield District Council from May 2007 until May 2009. In that role, he promoted Community Asset Transfers of two local buildings, the Acacia Centre in Annesley and the Manor Rooms in Teversal. His administration launched proposals for a Neighbourhood Charter of environmental pledges and the creation of new community protection services. It opened a new Lammas leisure centre in Sutton-in-Ashfield.

In May 2009, Labour took back control of Ashfield District Council and regained the leadership. In June 2009, Zadrozny held his County Council seat in the 2009 Nottinghamshire County Council election.

In the 2010 general election, Zadrozny stood as a Liberal Democrat for the parliamentary seat of Ashfield, losing to Labour's Gloria de Piero by 192 out of 48,196 votes cast, one of the closest results in the country, after the second biggest swing of the General Election.

He was re-elected to Ashfield District in 2011 and to the County Council again at its 2013 election.

In 2015, after his suspension as a member of the Liberal Democrats, Zadrozny left the party and was elected as an Independent for a newly created district council ward, Larwood. In November that year he formed the Ashfield Independents.

In the 2016 England and Wales police and crime commissioner elections, Zadrozny stood for the elected position of Nottinghamshire Police and Crime Commissioner. He announced his candidacy to highlight his belief that he was victim of a politically motivated attack, relating to his arrest and questioning over child sex allegations, charges which were subsequently dropped. Zadrozny received 7,164 votes, which was only 4.2 percent of the total, so he lost his deposit.

In May 2017, Zadrozny was elected to Nottinghamshire County Council for the new Ashfields division as an Ashfield Independent. In that election, Ashfield Independents candidates stood in five county divisions, and won all five. In October 2017, there was a council by-election in Hucknall North, where his party gained the seat after the Conservative incumbent, Ben Bradley, was elected as member of parliament for Mansfield at the general election in June and resigned his council seat. In the Sutton Junction and Harlow Wood by-election of December 2018, his party won again, with 82 percent of the votes.

In 2018, eight councillors defected from the incumbent Labour administration to Ashfield Independents, and Zadrozny was again elected as Leader of Ashfield District Council. His policies include the building a new leisure centre with swimming pools for Kirkby-in-Ashfield; restoration of the town clock; and community spring clean events.

In May 2019, Zadrozny‘s position at Ashfield District Council was secured when his new political party won all but five seats on the council.

In the 2019 general election, Zadrozny stood for Parliament in the Ashfield constituency again; this time for the Ashfield Independents. He came second, with 27.6 percent of the vote.

Zadrozny has stated that he voted for the United Kingdom to leave the European Union in the 2016 membership referendum, and later advocated leaving the EU as soon as possible.

In the 2024 general election, Zadrozny stood for Parliament in Ashfield for a third time. He came third, with 15.7 percent of the vote. Lee Anderson retained the seat for Reform UK, and Labour candidate Rhea Keehn came second.

In the 2025 County Council elections, Zadrozny lost his Ashfields division seat to Reform candidate Alan Bite.

Zadrozny is a member of the Local Government Association’s Fire Commission, and its Resources Board.

In September 2026, he resigned as leader of Ashfield Council and as the leader of the Ashfield Independents due to fraud and tax evasion convictions, but remained as a ward councillor, and apologised to the residents and staff of the council. Soon after in October, he was appointed to the planning committee of Ashfield District Council.

On 12 November 2026, following criticism from the two MPs concerned with Ashfield District Council's area, Zadrozny stood down from the council. His ward-seat will remain vacant until the next scheduled elections in May 2027.

== Personal life ==
In 2017, Zadrozny appeared before Nottingham Crown Court charged with child sex allegations. The Crown Prosecution Service offered no evidence, and the charges were dismissed.

In 2022, Zadrozny married his long-term partner.

In 2023, Zadrozny was charged with 12 counts of fraud by false representation, four counts of income tax evasion, and one of possessing cocaine. He pleaded not guilty to all charges. At the defence's request the trial was moved away from Nottinghamshire. It was transferred to Northampton, where it began on 24 August 2026.

On 21 September 2026, Zadrozny was found guilty of nine counts of fraud and four of tax evasion. He was found not guilty of three further counts of fraud.
