= Ashfield District =

Coordinates: 53.05°N 1.30°W

- Non-metropolitan district
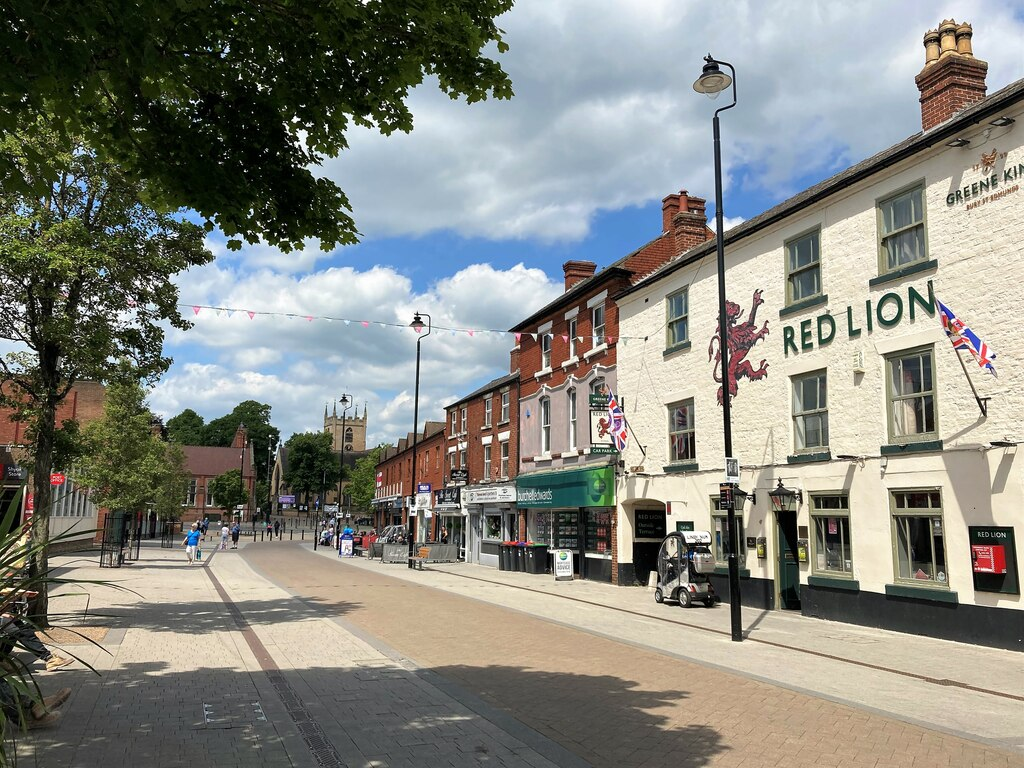
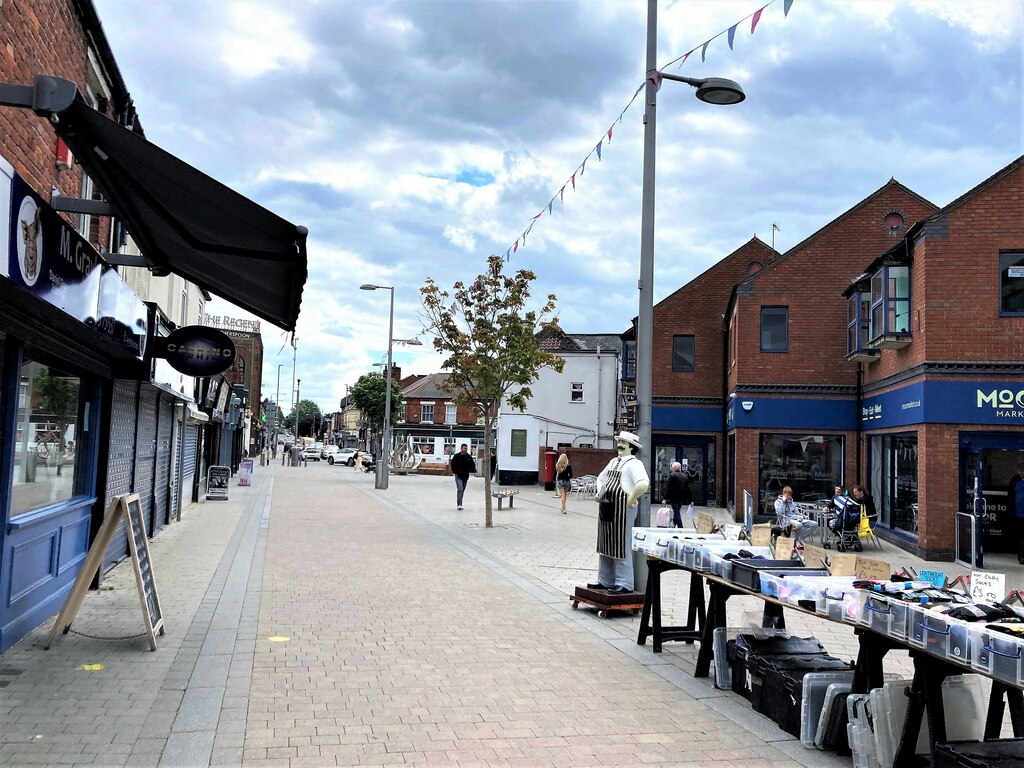
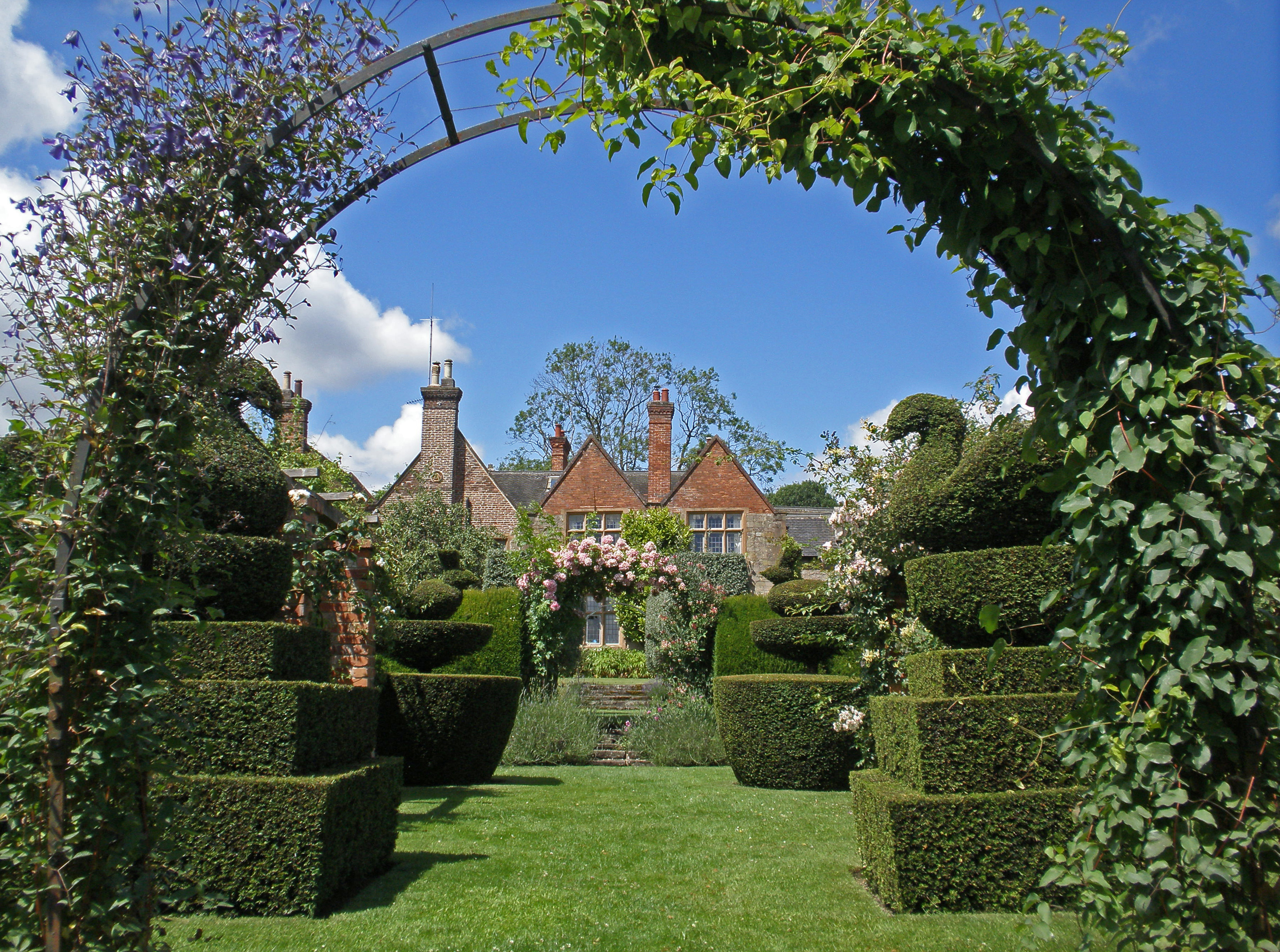
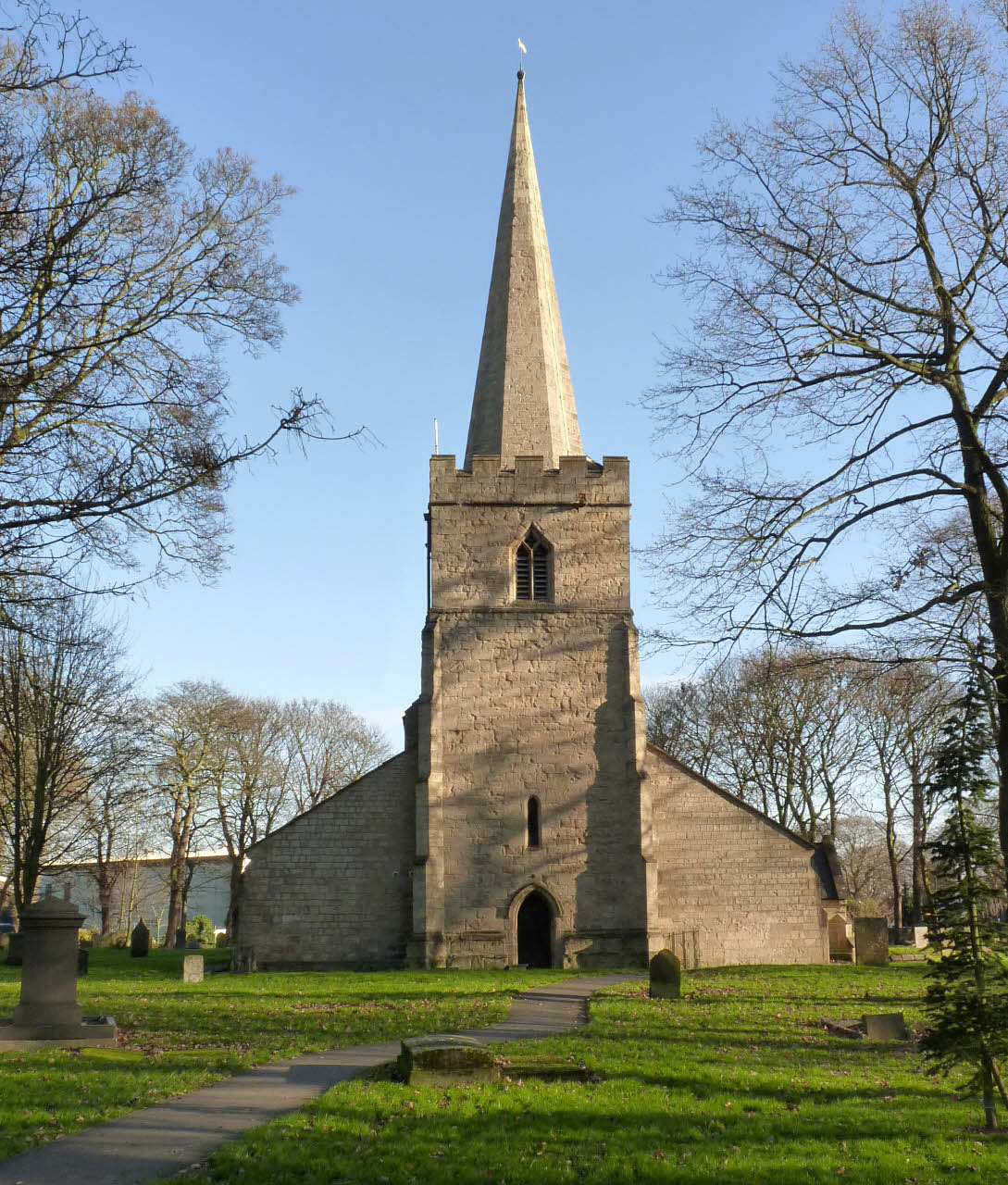
- Hucknall High Street Market Place, Kirkby in Ashfield Felley Priory St Mary Magdalene, Sutton in Ashfield
- Interactive map of Ashfield District
- Sovereign state: United Kingdom
- Constituent country: England
- Region: East Midlands
- Administrative county: Nottinghamshire
- Admin. HQ: Kirkby-in-Ashfield

Government
  - Type: Ashfield District Council
  - MPs: Lee Anderson (Reform UK); Michelle Welsh (Labour)

Area
  - Total: 42 sq mi (110 km^{2})
  - Rank: 190th

Population (2025)
  - Total: 130,581
  - Rank: Ranked 189th
  - Density: 3,100/sq mi (1,200/km^{2})

Ethnicity (2021)
  - Ethnic groups: List: 95.1% White; 1.6% Asian; 1.6% Mixed; 1.2% Black; 0.5% other

Religion (2021)
  - Religion: List: 53.4% no religion; 44.6% Christianity; 1.4% other; 0.6% Islam
- Time zone: UTC+0 (Greenwich Mean Time)
  - Summer (DST): UTC+1 (British Summer Time)
- ONS code: 37UB (ONS); E07000170 (GSS)

Ashfield (/ˈæʃˌfiːld/) is a local government district in Nottinghamshire, England. The council is based in Kirkby-in-Ashfield, but the largest town is neighbouring Sutton-in-Ashfield. The district also contains the town of Hucknall and a few villages. The district is mostly urban, with some of its settlements forming parts of both the Nottingham and Mansfield Urban Areas.

On 31 October 2026, a "rapid best value assessment" of the council was authorised by a local government minister after concerns were notified by the two Members of Parliament representing the Ashfield area.

The neighbouring districts are Mansfield, Newark and Sherwood, Gedling, Nottingham, Broxtowe, Amber Valley and Bolsover.

== History ==
The district was created on 1 April 1974 under the Local Government Act 1972, covering the whole of two former districts, most of Hucknall Urban District and of parts of a fourth, which were all abolished at the same time:

- Basford Rural District (parishes of Annesley, Felley and Selston only)
- Hucknall Urban District
- Kirkby in Ashfield Urban District
- Sutton in Ashfield Urban District

The new district was named Ashfield, being the shared suffix of two of the towns' names.

Under current local government reorganisation plans, all district councils in Nottinghamshire, as well as the county council, will be abolished in 2028, with the district becoming part of a new Nottinghamshire unitary authority.

== Governance ==
Ashfield District Council

Type
- Type: Non-metropolitan district

Leadership
- Chair: Dale Grounds, Ashfield Independents since 18 May 2026
- Leader: Samantha Deakin since 28 September 2026
- Chief Executive: Theresa Hodgkinson since 2021

Structure
- Seats: 35 councillors
- Graph of the party split among 35 seats.
- Political groups: Administration (21) Ashfield Ind. (18) Independent (3) Other parties (14) Reform (3) Conservative (1) Independent (10)

Elections
- Last election: 4 May 2023

Meeting place
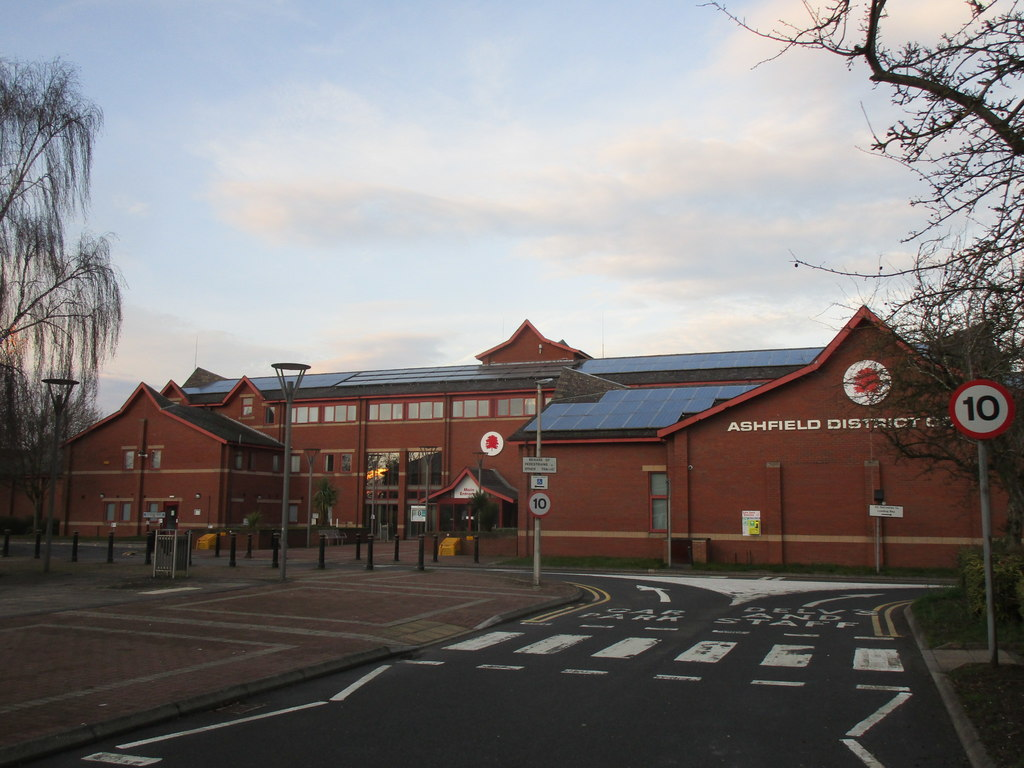
- Council Offices, Urban Road, Kirkby-in-Ashfield, Nottingham, NG17 8DA

Website
- www.ashfield.gov.uk

Ashfield District Council provides district-level services. County-level services are provided by Nottinghamshire County Council. Parts of the district are also covered by civil parishes, which form a third tier of local government.

=== Political control ===
A local party, the Ashfield Independents, has held a majority of the seats on the council since 2019.

The first election to the council was held in 1973, initially operating as a shadow authority alongside the outgoing authorities before coming into its powers on 1 April 1974. Political control of the council since 1974 has been as follows:

Party in control	Years
Labour	1974–2003
No overall control	2003–2011
Labour	2011–2018
No overall control	2018–2019
Ashfield Ind.	2019–present

=== Leadership ===
The leaders of the council since 1974 have been:

Councillor	Party	From	To
Clarence Booler	Labour	1974	Aug 1986
Jack Barker	Labour	1986	1987
Ken Creed	Labour	1987	Aug 1995
David Ayres	Labour	1995	30 Mar 1999
Chris Bonam	Labour	1999	2001
Ken Creed	Labour	2001	2007
Jason Zadrozny	Liberal Democrats	May 2007	Mar 2009
John Knight	Labour	Mar 2009	23 May 2013
Chris Baron	Labour	23 May 2013	May 2015
Cheryl Butler	Labour	May 2015	26 Apr 2018
Jason Zadrozny	Ashfield Ind.	26 Apr 2018	22 Sep 2026
Samantha Deakin	Ashfield Ind.	28 Sep 2026	

=== Composition ===
Following the 2023 election and subsequent by-elections and changes of allegiance up to October 2026, the composition of the council was:

Party	Seats
Ashfield Independents	18
Reform	3
Conservative	1
Independent	13
Total	35

=== Elections ===
Since the last boundary changes in 2015 the council has comprised 35 councillors representing 23 wards, with each ward electing one, two or three councillors. Elections are held every four years.

=== Premises ===
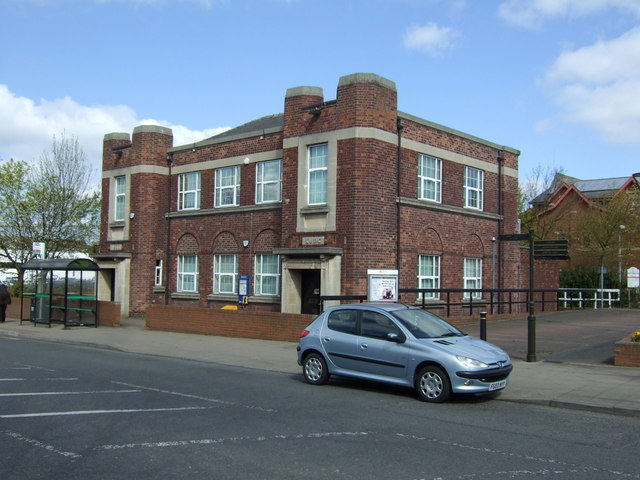
Ada Lovelace House, built 1933 as offices of Kirkby-in-Ashfield Urban District Council and used as one of Ashfield's offices until new offices were built immediately behind it in 1986.

The council is based at the Council Offices on Urban Road in Kirkby-in-Ashfield, completed in 1986 on a site behind the old headquarters (built 1933) of one of the council's predecessors, the Kirkby-in-Ashfield Urban District Council, with the old building now being known as Ada Lovelace House. The new building was officially opened in October 1986 by Birgitte, Duchess of Gloucester.

== Criticism ==
Following Jason Zadrozny's conviction for fraud and tax evasion after which his fellow independents appointed him to a cabinet position on planning and prior to his sentencing, ten councillors quit their party to establish their own political group, named District Alliance. On 22 October, the BBC reported that Ashfield MP Lee Anderson had posted at Facebook that former Ashfield Independent councillors would not be welcomed into Reform UK.

On 28 October 2026, Anderson called for Andy Burnham, the UK Prime Minister, to task government commissioners to investigate the council's governance. The PM offered to arrange a discussion between Anderson and Angela Rayner, as Secretary of State for Housing, Communities and Local Government, with Michelle Welsh MP, whose Sherwood Forest constituency lies partially within Ashfield, also expecting to consult Rayner.

On 31 October Jim McMahon, local government minister, ordered a "rapid best value assessment" of the council with additional involvement of an "external auditor". In a 2 November interaction with Jim McMahon in Parliament's House of Commons, Lee Anderson again requested Commissioners be tasked due to perceived conflict of interest concerning a contract awarded to an outside consultancy, whilst Michelle Welsh called for a police investigation.

On 12 November 2026 Zadrozny stood down from the council. His ward-seat will remain vacant until the next scheduled elections in May 2027.

== Settlements and parishes ==
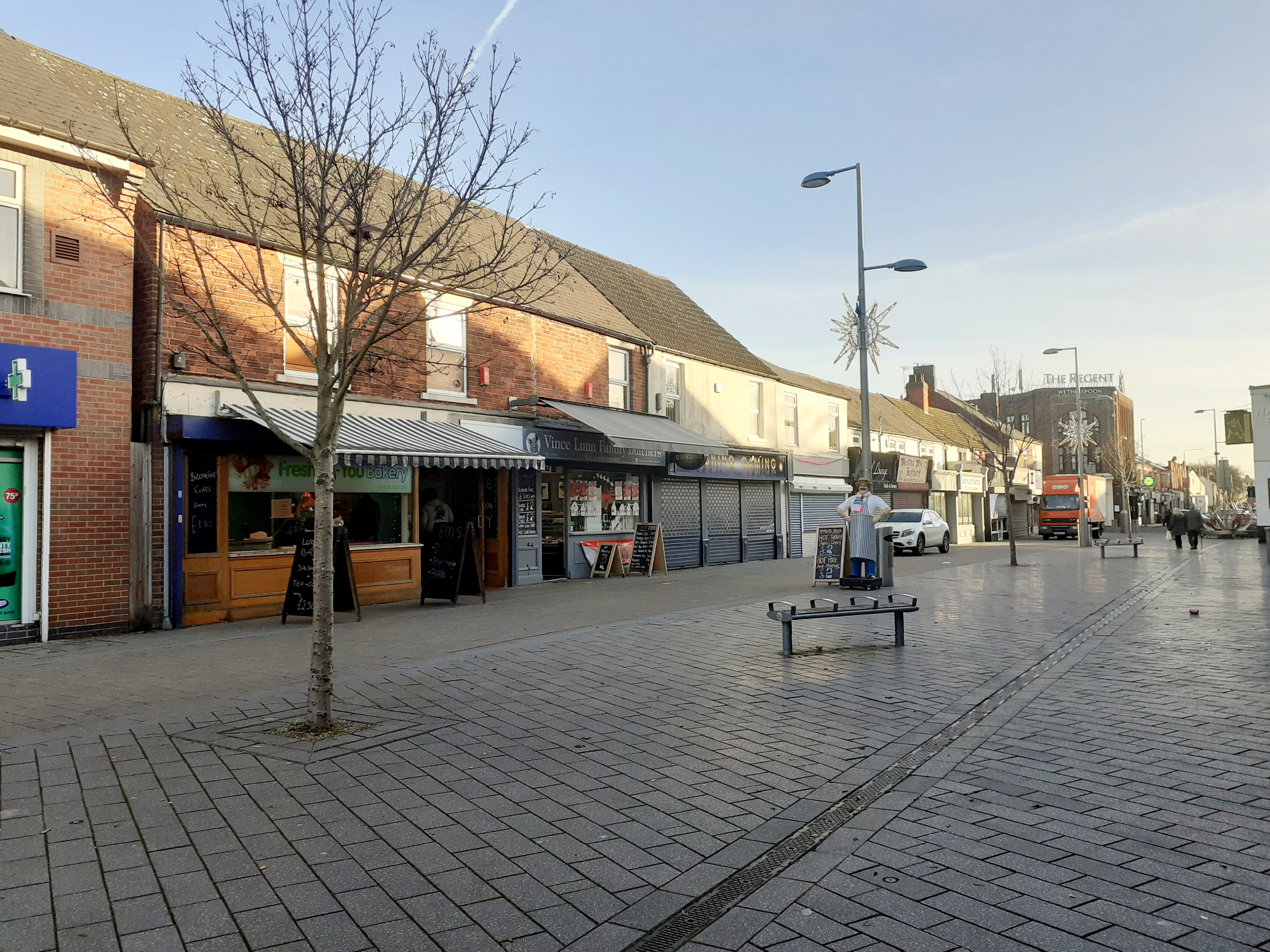
Kirkby-in-Ashfield, the third-largest settlement in the district and its administrative headquarters

Map of the district of Ashfield

There are just three civil parishes in the district, being Annesley, Felley and Selston. Annesley and Felley share a grouped parish council. The rest of the district, corresponding to the pre-1974 urban districts of Hucknall, Kirkby-in-Ashfield and Sutton-in-Ashfield, is an unparished area.

The largest settlement is Sutton-in-Ashfield. Towns and villages in the district include the following:

- Annesley
- Annesley Woodhouse
- Hucknall
- Huthwaite
- Jacksdale
- Kirkby-in-Ashfield
- Selston
- Skegby
- Sutton-in-Ashfield
- Stanton Hill
- Teversal
- Underwood

== Media ==
=== Television ===
The Ashfield District is served by BBC East Midlands and ITV Central with television signals receives from the Waltham TV transmitter. Northern parts of the district around Sutton-in-Ashfield and Kirkby-in-Ashfield receives better signals from the Emley Moor TV transmitter that broadcast BBC Yorkshire and ITV Yorkshire (West) programmes and the Belmont transmitter broadcasting BBC Yorkshire and Lincolnshire and ITV Yorkshire (East) programmes.

=== Radio ===
Radio stations that broadcast the area are:

- BBC Radio Nottingham on 95.5 FM
- Capital East Midlands on 96.5 FM
- Takeover Radio on 106.9 FM
- Mansfield 103.2 FM, a locally-based station which broadcast to the district from its studios in nearby Mansfield.
- Millside Radio

=== Newspapers ===
The Ashfield District is served by the local newspaper, Mansfield and Ashfield Chad.
