= Codnor Park and Selston railway station =

Former railway station in Nottinghamshire, England

Coordinates: 53.05923°N 1.33777°W

Codnor Park and Selston
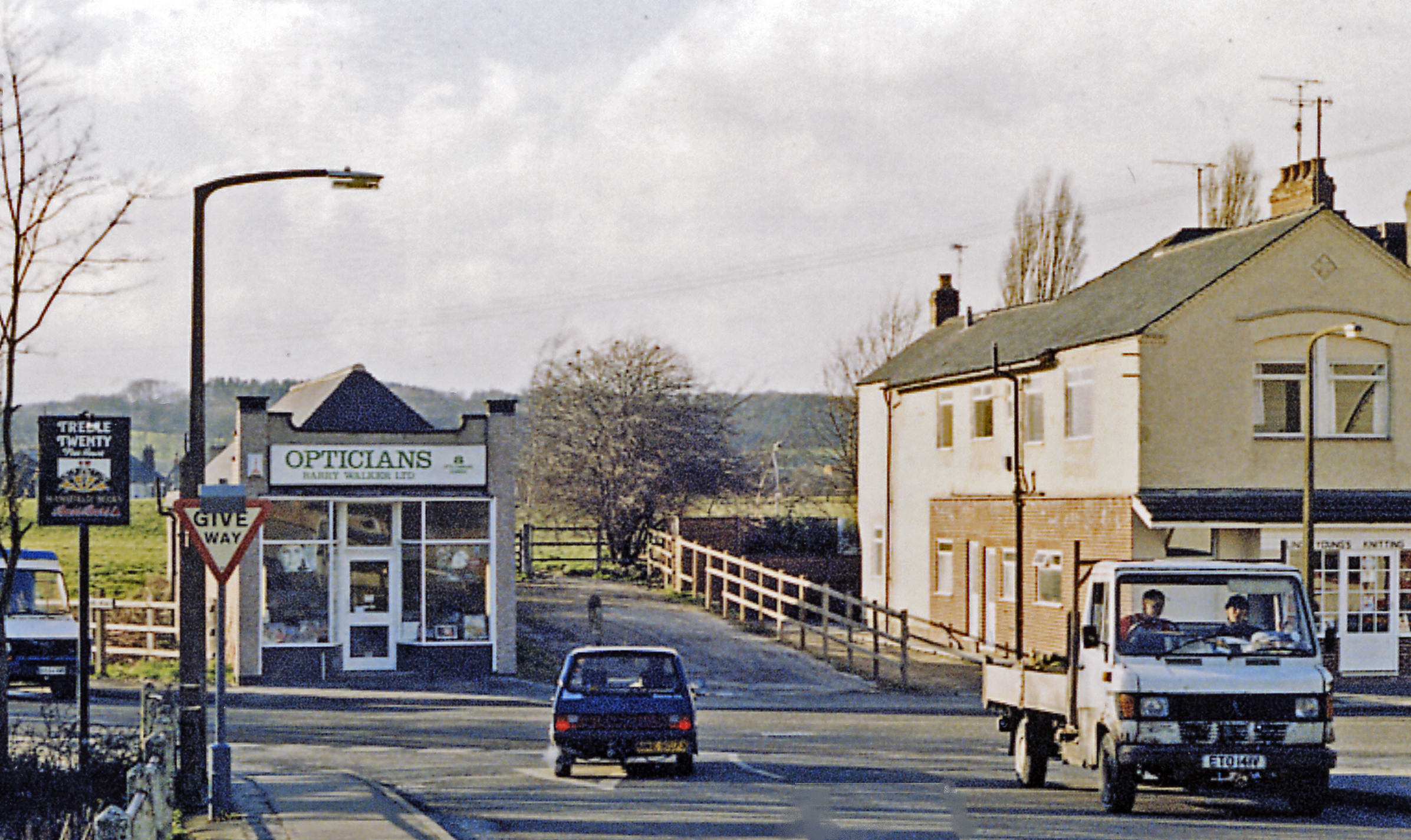
- Station location (1989)

General information
- Location: Ashfield; England

Other information
- Status: Disused

History
- Original company: Great Northern Railway
- Pre-grouping: Great Northern Railway
- Post-grouping: London and North Eastern Railway

Key dates
- 1 August 1876: Station opens as Codnor Park and Selston
- 22 May 1901: renamed Codnor Park for Ironville and Jacksdale
- 1 July 1950: renamed Jacksdale
- 7 January 1963: Station closes
Location

Codnor Park and Selston railway station was a former railway station to serve the villages of Codnor Park and Selston on the border between Derbyshire and Nottinghamshire and was actually in Jacksdale. In some timetables it was listed as Codnor Park and Selston for Ironville and Jacksdale.

It was opened by the Great Northern Railway (Great Britain) on its Derbyshire Extension in 1875-6 and closed in 1963.

It lay on the branch from Awsworth Junction, to Pinxton, Codnor Park being important for an ironworks belonging to the Butterley Company.

Codnor Park and Ironville railway station opened nearby in 1847 on the Midland Railway Erewash Valley Line. The tracks are still in place today; however, the line is not in use. They can be seen from trains running between Langley Mill and Alfreton

| Preceding station | Disused railways | Following station |
|---|---|---|
| Eastwood and Langley Mill | Great Northern Railway; GNR Derbyshire and Staffordshire Extension; Pinxton Branch | Pye Hill and Somercotes |
