= Hidden Valleys =

Rural area in Nottinghamshire

Coordinates: 53.06°N 1.20°W

Hidden Valley’s
- Area of historical and scenic value
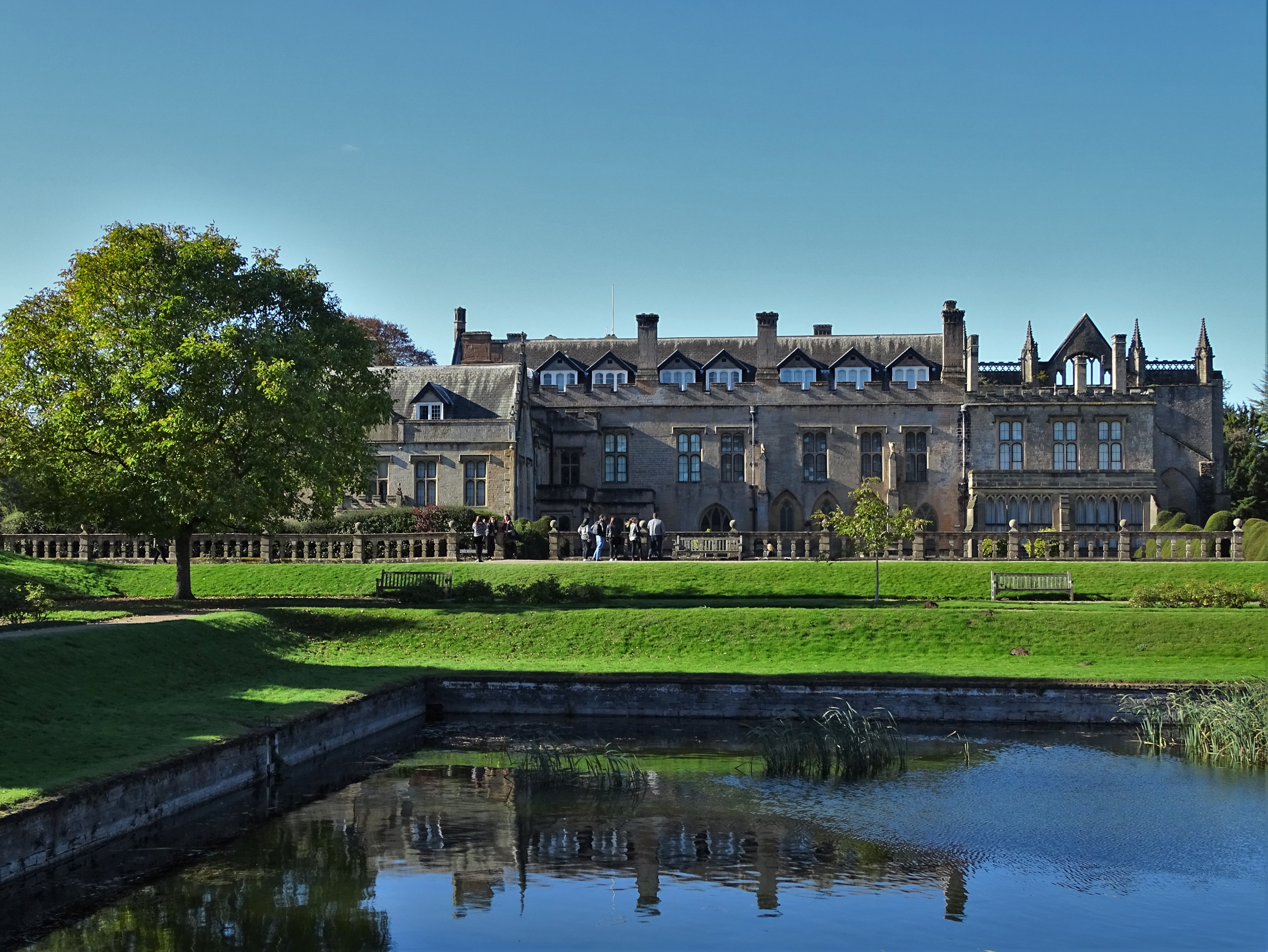
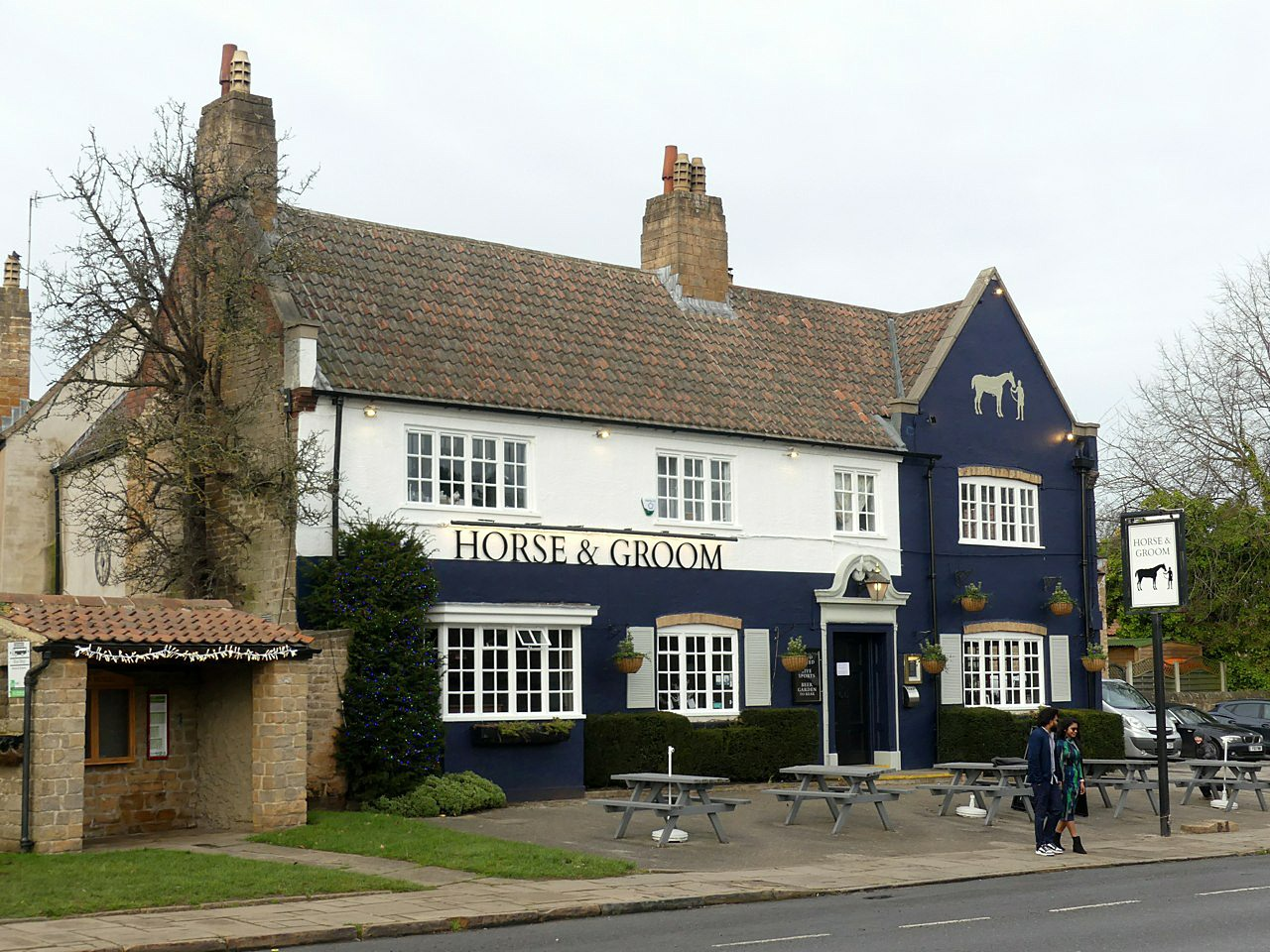
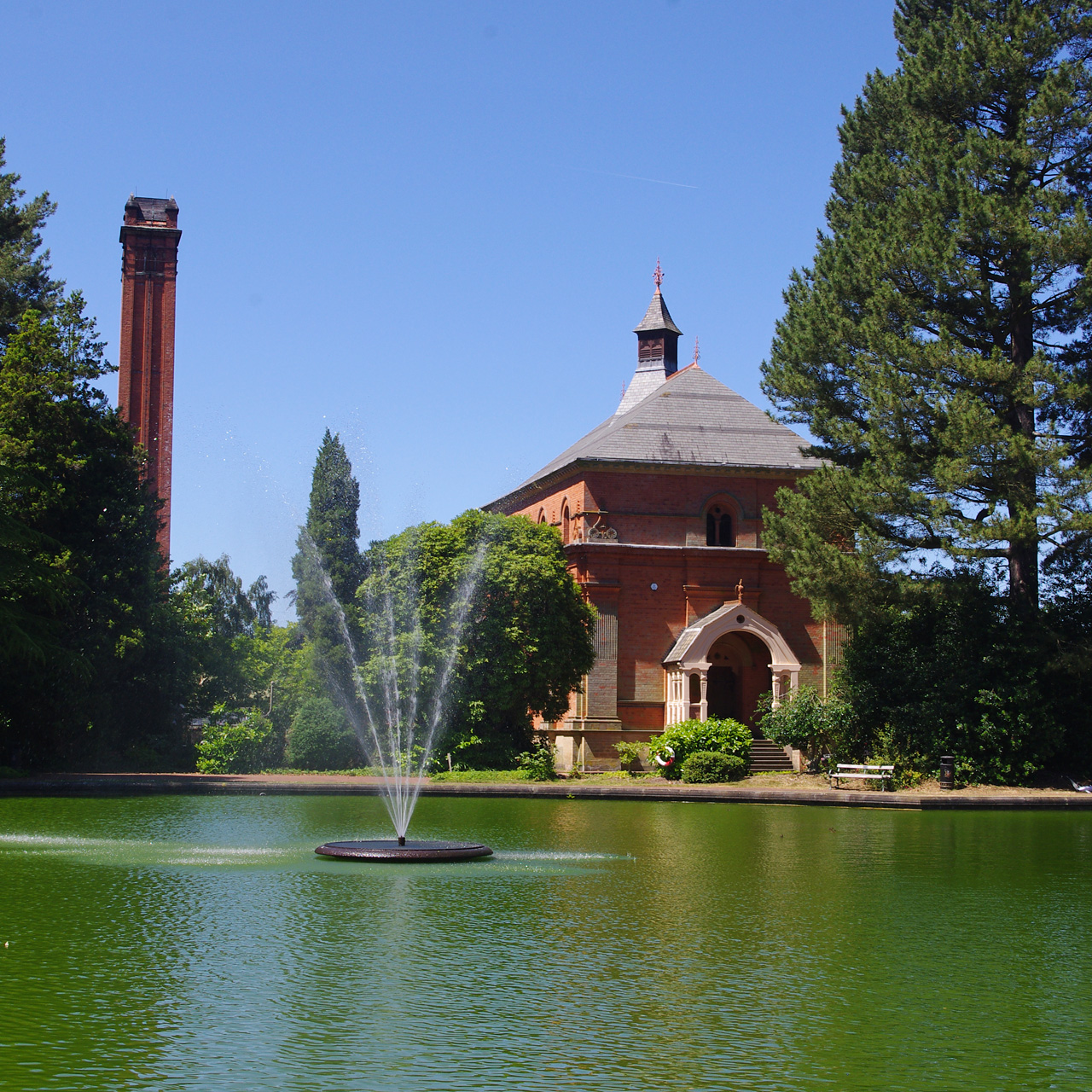
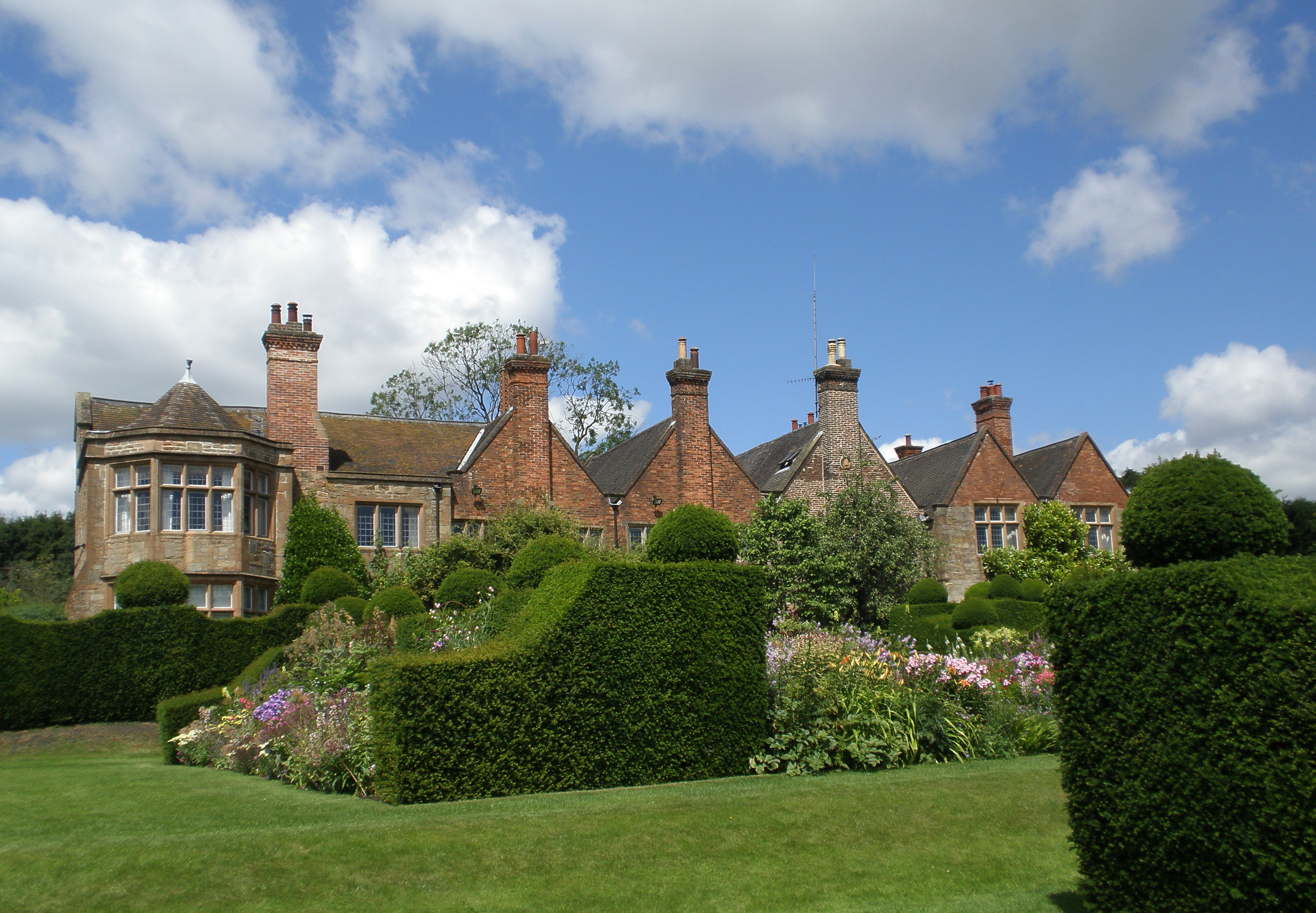
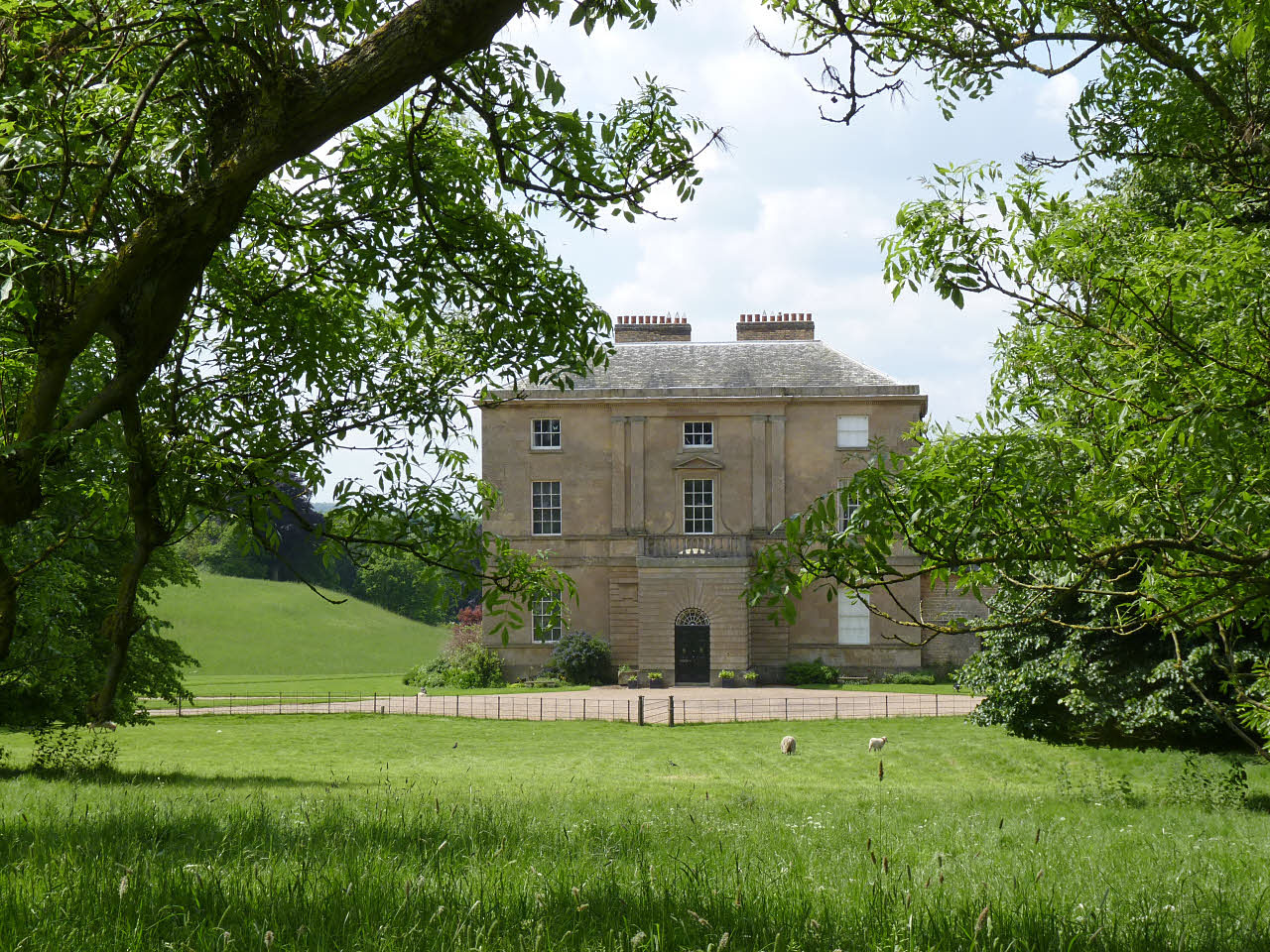
- Newstead Abbey Linby Pumping Station Felley Priory Papplewick Hall
- Interactive map of Hidden Valley’s

Hidden Valleys is a name, created in 2004, used to describe an area of interesting historical and scenic value between the city of Nottingham and the town of Mansfield in the English ceremonial county of Nottinghamshire.

The villages of Jacksdale, Underwood, Bagthorpe, Lower Bagthorpe, Selston, Annesley, Ravenshead, Newstead, Linby and Papplewick are set within the Hidden Valleys landscape.

== History ==
Valleys were created to encourage tourism in an area that had been blighted by industrial decline. Partners in the project were: Ashfield District Council; Gedling Borough Council; the East Midlands Development Agency; Nottinghamshire County Council; and the Coalfields Regeneration Trust. It was intended by the partners that the name would help the Ashfield area compete with the Peak District and Sherwood Forest.

== Areas of interest ==
- Annesley Old Church
- Newstead Abbey the former home of Lord Byron
- Felley Priory
- St Helen's Church, Selston
- Papplewick Pumping Station a Victorian waterworks and industrial museum.
- Linby
- Papplewick Hall and grounds are a private residence.

=== Places to visit nearby ===
- Church of St. Mary Magdalene, Hucknall, the resting place of the Byron family and home to a fine collection of stained glass by the acclaimed artist Charles Eamer Kempe.
- Bestwood Pumping Station
- D. H. Lawrence Birthplace Museum is located in Eastwood.
- Sherwood Forest

== Notable people ==
The area boasts links with the poet Lord Byron and his daughter Ada Lovelace.

== See also ==
- The Dukeries
