= Underwood, Nottinghamshire =

Village in Nottinghamshire, England

Coordinates: 53.05°N 1.29°W

Underwood
- Village
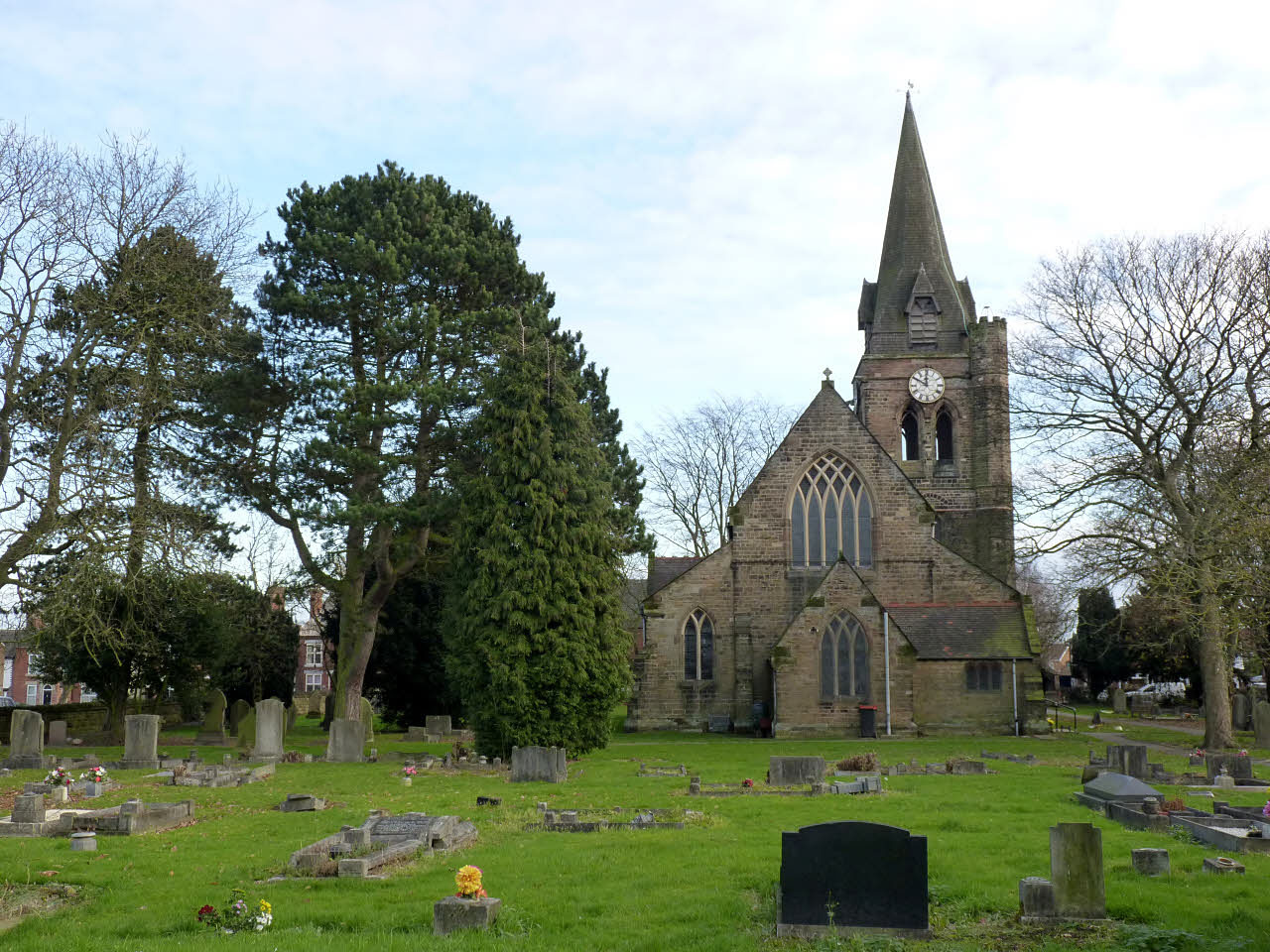
- Church of St Michael and All Angels

- Location within Nottinghamshire
- Population: 2,953 (Ward 2011)
- OS grid reference: SK474505
- Civil parish: Selston
- District: Ashfield
- Shire county: Nottinghamshire
- Region: East Midlands
- Country: England
- Sovereign state: United Kingdom
- Post town: Nottingham
- Postcode district: NG16
- Dialling code: 01773
- Police: Nottinghamshire
- Fire: Nottinghamshire
- Ambulance: East Midlands
- UK Parliament: Ashfield

Underwood is a hilltop village within the civil parish of Selston in the English ceremonial county of Nottinghamshire. The village is a ward of Ashfield with a population of 2,953 taken at the 2011 Census. It stands in a former coal mining area in the Hidden Valleys and is in the local government district of Ashfield. The village offers views across the Erewash Valley towards the Southern Pennines. It is situated near to junction 27 of the M1 and is bordered by Bagthorpe and Selston, and Brinsley and Moorgreen to the south. The gardens of Felley Priory are accessible from the village. It is part of Nottinghamshire's 'Hidden Valleys' area.

Bagthorpe Primary School and Underwood Church of England Primary School have good reputations, and as a consequence the area is a desirable one for families. This has increased house prices in Underwood and Bagthorpe, especially in Lower Bagthorpe and the area along Main Road, Underwood.

The village has a number of pubs including The Hole in the Wall, The Red Lion, The Shepherds Rest, Dixies Arms and The Dog & Quayle (previously The Sandhills).

Underwood Miners Welfare Cricket Club was founded in 1894 and is on Church Lane in Underwood. The club has three senior teams, two playing on Saturday in divisions D and L of the South Notts Cricket League and one on a Sunday in Section 1 of the Mansfield and District Cricket League.

== See also ==
- Listed buildings in Selston
