= Allsebrook =

Allsebrook is an English surname. Notable people with the surname include:

- John Allsebrook Simon (1873–1954), British politician
- Richard Allsebrook (1892–1961), English footballer
