= John Bancroft =

John Bancroft may refer to:

- John Bancroft (bishop) (1574–1640), bishop of Oxford
- John Bancroft (dramatist) (died 1696), English dramatist
- John Bancroft (architect) (1928–2011), British architect
- John Bancroft (sexologist) (born 1936), American physician
- John Bancroft (businessman) (21st century), British businessman
