= Jacksdale =

Village in Nottinghamshire, England

Coordinates: 53.05979°N 1.33448°W

- Village
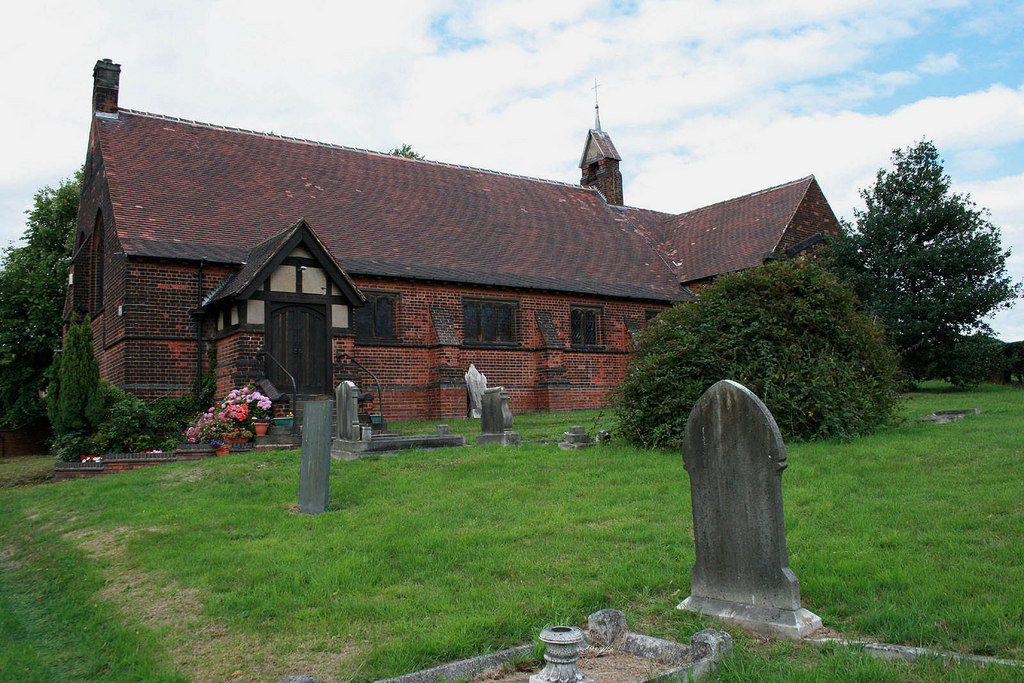
- St Mary’s Church

- Location within Nottinghamshire
- Population: 3,158 (ward.2011)
- OS grid reference: SK447516
- District: Ashfield
- Shire county: Nottinghamshire
- Region: East Midlands
- Country: England
- Sovereign state: United Kingdom
- Post town: NOTTINGHAM
- Postcode district: NG16
- Dialling code: 01773
- Police: Nottinghamshire
- Fire: Nottinghamshire
- Ambulance: East Midlands
- UK Parliament: Ashfield

Jacksdale is a village in the Ashfield local-government district of Nottinghamshire, England. The population of Jacksdale ward in Ashfield district was recorded as 3,158 in the 2011 census, and was estimated at 3,097 in 2019. Lying close to the Derbyshire border, Jacksdale is the westernmost community in its county. Neighbouring villages include Selston, Brinsley, Pye Hill and Ironville.

Jacksdale and Westwood are interlinked, although houses in Westwood are usually newer, whereas 86 per cent of the housing in Jacksdale was built before 1918.

== History ==
Jacksdale consisted of only three farms in 1811, but it emerged as the shopping and amenity centre for both villages after the arrival of the railway.

Jacksdale's pit was first sunk in 1874 by James Oakes & Co. Its entrance was sited at Selston Road at an "exposed" section of the Nottinghamshire coalfield. Pye Hill pit, as it was known, was actually an amalgamation of three individual pits sunk by different mining companies, Jacksdale's pit was renamed "Pye Hill No 2", No 1 being Selston/Underwood and No 3 New Selston.

Pye Hill pit was closed in 1985. The spoil heaps have since been made safe and landscaped for walking, providing access to nearby Jubilee Hill. The nature reserve there demonstrates colonising vegetation and scrub.

The Grey Topper music venue was located in Jacksdale. Many well-known bands and singers appeared there in the 1970's: Dr Feelgood (when called The Pig Boy Charlie Band) as mentioned in Julien Temple's film Oil City Confidential ('the silk top hat club'), Bill Haley, Billy Fury, glam rock band Sweet, Mud, Bay City Rollers, Hot Chocolate, soul legends Ben E king, Geno Washington, Edwin Starr, reggae greats Desmond Dekker and Jimmy Cliff, heavy metal acts UFO, Judas Priest, Saxon. Punk and new wave acts The Stranglers, The Vibrators, UK Subs, The Members, The Ruts, Angelic Upstarts, Ultravox, Adam and the Ants, The Pretenders, Toyah, The Specials, Simple Minds. Inevitably with punk, violence flared, culminating in the Angelic Upstarts riot gig that has gone down in Jacksdale folklore. The story of the Grey Topper is told in the book The Palace and the Punks by Tony Hill.

Yew Tree Farm, Westwood situated on Main Road adjacent to Westwood Farm. Built 17th century, now a fishing centre.

In 1850, Westwood was a small hamlet, and the village of Jacksdale barely existed. However, the following decades saw rapid growth as housing and services were developed for employees at Pye Hill Colliery (opened 1875) and James Oakes and Co, ironworks.

== Governance ==
Selston Parish Council, which covers Jacksdale and Westwood, meets on the last Tuesday of the month. The local member of Parliament is Lee Anderson (Reform) for the Ashfield constituency.

== Amenities ==
Local amenities include a post office, a supermarket, a chemist, hair salons and barbers, an estate agency and lettings agency, a hardware and motor parts outlet, a repair garage, butchers, a newsagent, a library, the Miners' Welfare, a tearoom, a primary and nursery school, a Pentecostal church, a Chinese restaurant, a community centre, a fish and chip shop, dentists' and doctors' surgeries, care homes, and a garden centre.

Several local community groups for adults, children and special interests are shared with Westwood. The Anglican St. Mary's Church, Westwood, which also covers Jacksdale, is a daughter church of St. Helen's Church, Selston.

== Notable people ==
- Actress Samantha Beckinsale (born 1966), daughter of actor Richard Beckinsale and half-sister of actress Kate Beckinsale, was born in Jacksdale.
- John F. Kennedy, former US president, once stayed at a farm in Jacksdale, whilst visiting his sister at Chatsworth House in Derbyshire.
- John Newbold (1952–1982), Grand Prix motorcycle road racer, was born in Jacksdale and raised in nearby South Normanton.
- Kyle Ryde (born 1997), British 2014 Superstock 600 Champion, 2015 Supersport road race contender, and British Superbikes 2024 Champion has lived mainly in Jacksdale since moving from nearby Swanwick, Derbyshire, as an infant.

== See also ==
- Hidden Valleys of Nottinghamshire
- St. Mary's Church, Westwood
- UK miners' strike (1984–1985)
- Listed buildings in Selston
