= Listed buildings in Selston =

Selston is a civil parish in the Ashfield district of Nottinghamshire, England. The parish contains eight listed buildings that are recorded in the National Heritage List for England. Of these, one is listed at Grade II*, the middle of the three grades, and the others are at Grade II, the lowest grade. The parish contains the villages of Selston, Bagthorpe, Jacksdale and Underwood and the surrounding countryside. The listed buildings consist of the remains of a manor house, a barn, two farmhouses, two churches, a lychgate and a war memorial.

== Key ==
Grade	Criteria
II*	Particularly important buildings of more than special interest
II	Buildings of national importance and special interest

== Buildings ==
Name and location	Photograph	Date	Notes	Grade
St Helen's Church, Selston; 53.07505°N 1.31732°W		13th century	The church has been altered and extended through the centuries, including a restoration in 1899, and an extension in 1904–05. The church is built in stone with slate roofs, and consists of a nave with a clerestory, north and south aisles, a south porch, a chancel, a vestry, an organ chamber, a memorial chapel and a west tower. The tower has two stages, a chamfered and moulded plinth, diagonal buttresses, a string course, an eaves band, and an embattled parapet with an inscription and a coat of arms. On the west side is a doorway with a chamfered surround and a hood mould, above which is a triple lancet window with a hood mould, and the bell openings are double lancets with Y-tracery and hood moulds.	II*
Remains of Wansley Hall; 53.05708°N 1.31308°W		13th century	The roofless remains of a manor house in stone and brick, with some internal timber framing, on a partial chamfered plinth, with stone dressings and quoins. There are two storeys and an L-shaped plan, consisting of a former hall with three bays, and a projecting wing to the south. The openings include a doorway with a flat hood, and mullioned windows.	II
Barn east of Wansley Hall; 53.05707°N 1.31229°W	—	16th century (probable)	The barn is in stone and timber framing with brick nogging on a stone plinth, and has a pantile roof. It was converted into two houses in 1980, and the gables were rebuilt in brick in 1986. There are two storeys and six bays, and all the windows are casements.	II
Dog Kennel Farmhouse; 53.08412°N 1.31045°W	—	1666	The farmhouse, later a private house, is in partly stuccoed brick, with moulded floor and eaves bands and a tile roof. There are two storeys, three bays, and a later lean-to extension to the east. The central doorway has chamfered jambs, and a fanlight. The windows are casements, most with chamfered mullions.	II
Manor Farmhouse; 53.05944°N 1.30689°W		Late 18th century	The farmhouse is in red brick with stone dressings and a tile roof. There are two storeys and attics and a T-shaped plan, with a front range of three bays, and a two-storey rear wing. In the centre is a doorway with a fanlight, and the windows on the front are sashes, all the openings with quoined surrounds. At the rear are casement windows with segmental heads, and a porch.	II
Church of St Michael and All Angels, Underwood; 53.05230°N 1.29482°W		1889–91	The church, designed by J. A. Chatwin, is in stone with a tile roof. It consists of a nave, a baptistry, north and south aisles, a south porch, a north transept, a chancel and a southeast steeple. The steeple has a tower with two stages, a diagonal east buttress, a west octagonal turret with an embattled parapet, moulded string courses, double lancet bell openings with linked hood moulds and clock faces above, a moulded coped parapet, and a recessed octagonal spire with lucarnes containing double lancet windows and a weathercock.	II
Lychgate, Church of St Michael and All Angels, Underwood; 53.05218°N 1.29443°W		1890	The lychgate, designed by J. A. Chatwin, has stone walls with chamfered coping, and the superstructure is in timber. The roof is tiled, and has gable crosses, the gables have arch braces and bargeboards, and the gates have spiked tops.	II
Jacksdale War Memorial; 53.05967°N 1.33638°W		1921	The war memorial stands on an island in a road junction, and has a Stancliffe stone plinth and a statue in Portland stone. The plinth has corner pilasters, a dentilled capstone, and a wreath carved in relief. The statue, which stands on a platform, is a replacement of the original statue, and was added in 2009. It depicts a soldier, standing and holding a rifle. On the sides of the plinth are slate plaques with inscriptions and the names of those who served in the First World War, and the names of those lost in the two World Wars.	II
