= Bunches Florapost =

Flower company in Newstead, Nottinghamshire

Bunches Florapost Ltd.
- Trade name: Bunches
- Type: Private limited company
- Industry: Floristry, online retail
- Founded: 1989; 37 years ago in Mansfield, Nottinghamshire
- Founders: Erik Hoving; Sandra Hoving
- Headquarters: Newstead, Nottinghamshire, England
- Area served: United Kingdom
- Key people: Dani Turner (director); Dan Turner (director)
- Products: Flowers, houseplants, hampers, greetings cards, gifts
- Website: www.bunches.co.uk

Bunches Florapost Ltd., trading as Bunches, is a British flowers by post company based in Newstead, Nottinghamshire. Erik and Sandra Hoving founded it in 1989 as a flower stall in Mansfield, and it began sending bouquets by post through Post Office branches the following year. The company is still owned and run by the founding family. It sells flowers, houseplants, hampers and greetings cards, mostly through its website, and gives at least 10% of its annual profits to charity.

== History ==
=== Flower stall and Post Office sales ===
Bunches is a family-run business founded by Erik and Sandra Hoving in 1989. It started as a small flower stall under a 3 metre by 4 metre umbrella in the Four Seasons shopping centre in Mansfield, Nottinghamshire. According to the company, the idea of sending flowers by post came from conversations with customers at the stall.

The postal business began in January 1990, operating out of a factory in Kirkby-in-Ashfield. Orders were taken over the Post Office counter and then telephoned through to the Bunches office, which at the time had three staff. Five bouquets were dispatched in the first week.

=== Expansion ===
In 1992, Bunches expanded to all Post Offices nationwide and began selling by direct mail. Around this time it also started offering chocolates with its flowers. The company began offering flower delivery online via their website around 2000.

In 2001, having outgrown the original location, Bunches moved to purpose-built premises in Newstead Village, Nottinghamshire, with a customer support office, and production and dispatch facilities on one site. A £1 million extension, which doubled the production floor space and added new offices, was completed in November 2007.

The business has since passed from the founders to the next generation of the family. Erik and Sandra Hoving's daughter, Dani Turner, took over the running of the company in 2006, and her husband, Dan Turner, joined her in 2012. The Hovings remained directors until October 2024.

The company received local press coverage for continuing to grow during the Great Recession. In 2017, Bunches launched a major revamp of its brand and website.

By its 30th anniversary in 2019, the company employed 50 people and had delivered more than 10 million gifts. It has since delivered over 13 million.

In 2024, Bunches launched mobile applications on Android and iOS. The website's colours and typefaces were updated in October 2026.

== Operations ==
Bunches sells online, through affiliates, by direct mail and to businesses. Most of its trade comes through the Bunches.co.uk website. Alongside bouquets it sells houseplants, hampers, greetings cards and gifts.

=== In-house production ===
The company's work is carried out at the Newstead site. Bouquets are designed, made up, quality-checked and dispatched there by Bunches staff, and the customer support team works in the same building. Hamper design, software development and marketing are also done in-house.

=== Sourcing and delivery ===
Bunches imports flowers from around the world. Where possible, its Colombian flowers come from farms certified under the Florverde Sustainable Flowers scheme, which sets standards for water use, emissions and waste, and for workers' pay and conditions. Bunches is a member of The Flowers & Plants Association and is listed as supplying ethically grown flowers and plants.

Orders are delivered by Royal Mail Tracked 24 and Special Delivery, and by couriers including DPD and DHL. The company delivers to England, Wales, Scotland, Northern Ireland and the Isle of Man, and does not offer same-day delivery.

=== Letterbox flowers ===
Bunches sells a range of letterbox flowers, which are packed flat in a box that fits through a standard letterbox, so the recipient does not need to be at home. The flowers are sent in bud for the recipient to arrange, with a paper wrap, flower food and care instructions. In 2019 the letterbox range became the company's first to be sold with entirely plastic-free packaging.

=== Customer support ===
Customer support is based at the head office in Newstead Village, Nottinghamshire, and can be reached by telephone, email, WhatsApp and live chat on weekdays. Live chat enquiries may be answered first by an automated assistant, and customers can ask to be passed to a member of staff at any point.

=== Posy Points ===
Posy Points is the company's loyalty scheme. Account holders earn five points for every pound spent. Each point is worth one penny against a later order, and points expire two years after they are earned. Points are also awarded to customers who refer a friend.

=== Customer reviews ===
Bunches collects customer reviews through the review platform Reviews.io. As of November 2026, the company has an average rating of 4.7 out of 5 from more than 210,000 reviews.

== Sustainability ==
Bunches has said its long-term aim is to remove plastic from its packaging entirely. In 2019, when the letterbox range became plastic-free, the company also switched to compostable flower food sachets and stopped selling helium balloons.

In October 2024, 387 solar panels were installed on the roof of the Newstead building. The company said in July 2025 that the panels had supplied about a third of its electricity since then. All plant waste from the site is composted, and food waste is sent for anaerobic digestion.

On 18 August 2026, Bunches Florapost Ltd filed UK patent application GB2619236.9 for "florii nest", a system developed in-house to keep cut flowers supplied with water while in transit. The application covers a coating for the "nest", the container that holds water around the stems. The coating does a similar job to the waterproof lining of a disposable coffee cup, but the nest remains fully recyclable.

== Charitable activities ==
Since it was founded, Bunches has given a minimum of 10% of its profits each year to charitable projects. It runs this work under the name "Making a Difference". By 2019 the company said its donations had passed £1 million.

Its main partner is the charity Links International. Most of the funding goes to projects in Malawi, where it pays for small business loans, solar-powered irrigation, and education programmes for children. One of these, the Seeds of Promise project, irrigates four hectares of farmland and uses the profits to feed 400 children each week. Money has also gone to disaster relief, including £2,500 given through Links International after flooding in Pakistan in 2026.

In Nottinghamshire, Bunches donates each year to the St John's Outreach Project, a food bank in Kirkby-in-Ashfield.

== Awards ==
- 2010: Company of the Year, Nottingham Post Business Awards.
- 2025: Best Marketing Campaign, Fresh Produce Consortium Fresh Awards, for a Mother's Day campaign called "Celebrating Super Mums". Bunches was also a finalist for Online Floral Retailer of the Year.
- 2026: National People's Choice Family Business of the Year and Midlands & Central People's Choice Family Business of the Year, at the National Family Business of the Year Awards run by Family Business United. Both are decided by public vote.
