= John Bancroft (businessman) =

British businessman

- Occupations: Managing director & founder
- Employer: Badgemaster
- Awards: Member of the Most Excellent Order of the British Empire (MBE)

John Bancroft MBE is an English businessman, based in Derbyshire, United Kingdom. He was awarded a Member of the Most Excellent Order of the British Empire as part of Queen Elizabeth's 2013 Birthday Honours for his services to business in Nottinghamshire.

Bancroft is the founder, managing director and chairman of UK-based Badgemaster. He is also founder and chairman of the Badgemaster Group. His work in the Nottinghamshire area, led to his company receiving Nottinghamshire County Council's first "Bridge to Work" Award in 1997.

== Career ==
John Bancroft started his career in the corporate clothing industry, working for Sketchley Services as their National Sales Manager. After working at Sketchley, Bancroft decided that there was a gap in the market for quality badges, as many of the badges at the time were imports of a low quality.

In 1992, Bancroft founded Badgemaster with his wife Vicky. In the early days, the Nottinghamshire based company traded from a small portacabin with a single employee.

By 1997, Bancroft was seen as an influential figure in the Nottinghamshire area, receiving an award from Nottinghamshire County Council for job creation in an area of high unemployment. Bancroft secured work with the British royal family in 2006, therefore receiving a Royal warrant of appointment for his company.

In October 2013, Bancroft was awarded a Member of the Most Excellent Order of the British Empire, otherwise known as an MBE. The award came as part of Queen Elizabeth's Birthday Honours List in June 2013.

In 2017, the Bancrofts were presented with a lifetime achievement award at the Professional Clothing Awards for their contributions to the clothing industry.

Bancroft was involved in the takeover of the Akorn Badge Company in August 2014.

In June 2018 John Bancroft was appointed to the board as a Director of The Professional Clothing Association Worldwide.

== Newstead, Nottinghamshire ==
Bancroft's company has had an influence on the surrounding areas. The area of Newstead, Nottinghamshire was a former coal mining village and therefore suffered large-scale unemployment following the closure of the mines during the 1980s in the United Kingdom. Bancroft's company became a key employer in the area shortly after it was founded, and received Nottinghamshire County Council's first "Bridge to Work" Award in 1997.
