= Church of St Michael and All Angels, Underwood =

Coordinates: 53°03′07″N 01°17′40″W

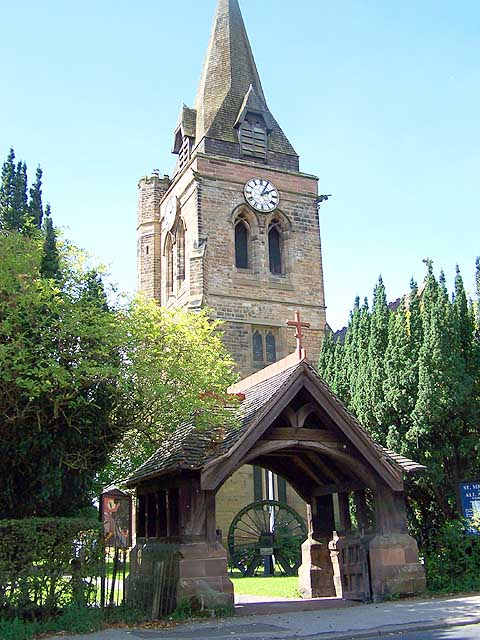
- Church of St Michael and All Angels, Underwood
- Denomination: Church of England
- Churchmanship: Broad Church
- Website: www.brinsleywithunderwood.com

History
- Dedication: St Michael and All Angels

Administration
- Diocese: Diocese of Southwell and Nottingham
- Parish: Underwood, Nottinghamshire

Clergy
- Vicar: David Stevenson

The Church of St Michael and All Angels, Underwood is a parish church in the Church of England in Underwood, Nottinghamshire.

The church is Grade II listed by the Department for Digital, Culture, Media and Sport as it is a building of special architectural or historic interest.

== History ==
The church was commissioned by Francis Cowper, 7th Earl Cowper and built in 1890. The architect was J. A. Chatwin of Birmingham.

== Current parish status ==
It is in a group of parishes which includes:

- Church of St Mary, Eastwood
- Church of St James the Great, Brinsley
- Church of St Michael and All Angels, Underwood

The Clergy list of the church:

- 1861–1867: Edward Cayley
- 1867–1874: John Dawson Gibson
- 1874–1880: Charles Edward Thornes Roberts
- 1881–1918: Percival Page
- 1918–1919: H B Edwards
- 1920–1924: George William Ready
- 1924–1926: F L Farmer
- 1926–1935: L C Rowan-Robinson
- 1935–1948: Fred John Starmer
- 1949–1957: J H Newbury
- 1957–1962: Cyril Vincent Miles
- 1963–1967: John Bernardi
- 1967–1982: William G E Porter
- 1982–1987: Lance Clark
- 1987–1994: David L Harper
- 1995–2002: Faith Cully
- 2003–2009: Robert Murray
- 2009–present: David Stevenson

== See also ==
- Listed buildings in Selston
