= St Mary's Church, Westwood =

Coordinates: 53°03′28″N 01°19′56″W

St. Mary's Church, Westwood
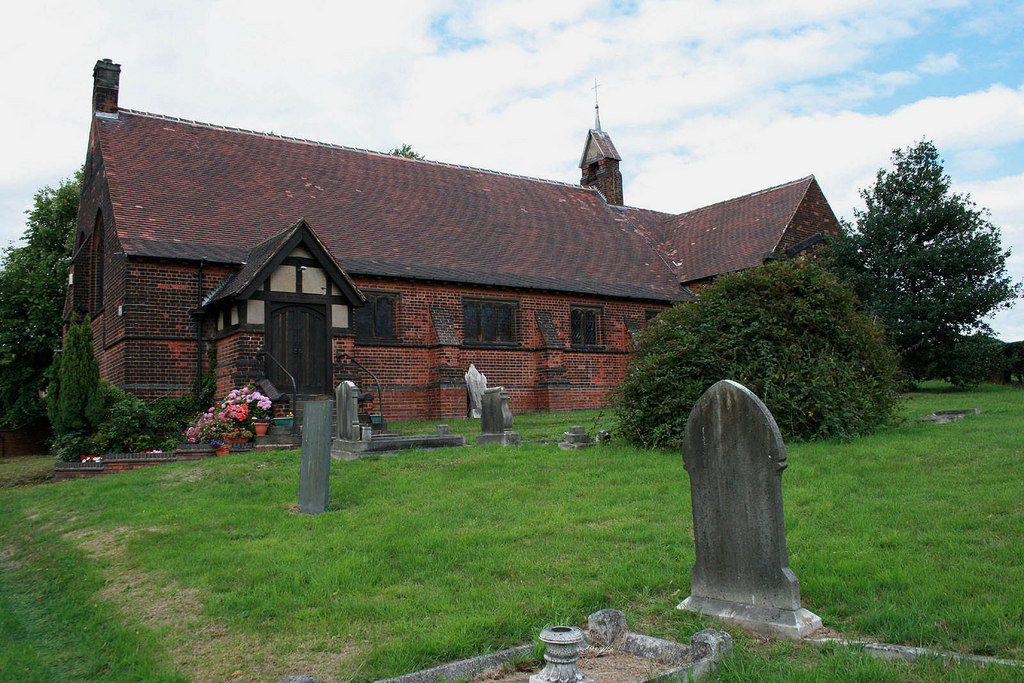
- St. Mary's Church, Westwood
- St. Mary's Church, Westwood
- Denomination: Church of England
- Churchmanship: Broad Church
- Website: www.stmarys-westwood.org

History
- Dedication: St. Mary

Administration
- Province: York
- Diocese: Southwell and Nottingham
- Parish: Jacksdale

Clergy
- Vicar: Revd Fiona Shouler

St. Mary's Church, Westwood is a parish church in the Church of England in Jacksdale, Nottinghamshire.

== History ==
The church was built in 1898 to the designs of the architect Percy Heylyn Currey to serve the expanding mining villages. Francis Cowper, 7th Earl Cowper provided the land and James Oakes provided funding. The church cost £2,000.

Although the church is in Jacksdale, it takes its name from the village of Westwood where services were held at the village school for 30 years before the church was built.

== Current parish status ==
It is a daughter church to St. Helen's Church, Selston.
