= Pinxton South railway station =

Former railway station in Nottinghamshire, England

Coordinates: 53.0844°N 1.3226°W

Pinxton South

General information
- Location: Selston, Ashfield; England

Other information
- Status: Disused

History
- Original company: Great Northern Railway
- Post-grouping: London and North Eastern Railway

Key dates
- 1 August 1876: Station opens as Pinxton (Pinxton for South Normanton in some timetables)
- January 1954: renamed Pinxton South
- 7 January 1963: Station closes
Location

Pinxton South railway station was a former railway station that served Pinxton, Derbyshire; the station site lies within the parish of Selston, Nottinghamshire. It was opened by the Great Northern Railway (Great Britain) as "Pinxton" on its Derbyshire Extension in 1875-6 In some timetables it was listed as "Pinxton for South Normanton". It was renamed "Pinxton South" in January 1954.

Pinxton (South) station closed in January 1963 with the withdrawal of all regular passenger services beyond Awsworth Junction. At the time of this withdrawal Awsworth Junction signal box moved from 24 to 8 hour opening with the remaining Pinxton branch freight traffic being confined to 'morning shift' working. It retained the South suffix to the end although the nearby Midland Railway Pinxton & Selston station situated on the Pye Bridge to Kirkby-in-Ashfield line had closed to all regular passenger services many years earlier. It was the 'Friargate' line itself that closed in to all regular passenger services in September 1964 although this remained open for freight traffic throughout for a few more years.

== Route ==
Preceding station	Disused railways	Following station
Pye Hill and Somercotes	Great Northern Railway; GNR Derbyshire and Staffordshire Extension; Pinxton Branch	Terminus
