= Badgemaster =

British company that manufactures business badges

- Company type: Private company
- Industry: Manufacturing
- Founded: 1992; 33 years ago
- Founders: John Bancroft and Victoria Bancroft
- Headquarters: Newstead, Nottinghamshire, United Kingdom
- Area served: Europe
- Key people: Tom Craig (Chairman) and Ian Bradbeer (Managing Director)
- Products: Badges
- Owner: Jim Kent
- Number of employees: 105 (2015)
- Website: badgemaster.co.uk

Badgemaster is a British-based business that manufactures badges, based near Nottingham, United Kingdom. The company (was founded by John Bancroft.) and is owned by Jim Kent. Since 2017, Tom Craig has been Chairman and Ian Bradbeer the Managing Director.

== History ==
The company was founded in 1992 by John and Vicky Bancroft. In the first year of operation, it was reported that the company operated from a portacabin in Nottinghamshire. The company was founded after Bancroft spent a number of years in the corporate clothing industry.

In 1993, the company moved to a purpose built factory on the site of the former Newstead Colliery. The company have remained on this site and have extended the factory to its present 12,500 square feet.

In 1997, Badgemaster received an award from Nottinghamshire County Council following its job creation and staff training in the area. At the time, it was quoted that a number of the staff members lived within the local community of Newstead, Nottinghamshire. Nottinghamshire County Council quoted that the company had become an integral part of the community and awarded Badgemaster with the inaugural "Bridge to Work" Award. Before the establishment of Badgemaster in the area, it was widely reported that job opportunities were lacking in Newstead, Nottinghamshire. Newstead was formerly known as Newstead Colliery Village and suffered large scale Unemployment following the closure of the mines during the 1980s, which were widespread throughout in the United Kingdom.

The company began to work with the British royal family in 2006. Badgemaster expanded over the following years, working with a number of major brands, becoming one of the largest badge manufactures and providers in Europe.

In 2013, the company founder was awarded a Member of the Most Excellent Order of the British Empire, otherwise known as an MBE. The announcement had come a number of months prior.

Badgemaster announced a takeover of the Scottish-based Akorn Badge Company, one of their major UK competitors in 2014. Following the takeover of the company, the operations were moved to Badgemaster's Nottinghamshire headquarters. Akorn had been part of the badge market for over 30 years, before the Badgemaster acquisition.

in 2017 Ian Bradbeer was appointed Managing Director https://www.linkedin.com/in/ian-bradbeer-0bbb325/ to drive the company to the next level.

In 2023 Corporate Insignia Ltd was acquired by Badgemaster and relocated to the Nottinghamshire site. The Corporate Insignia by Badgemaster brand continues to be the international standard aluminum name badge for Hotels and Cruise Lines with many International Hotel Groups amongst its prestigious client base throughout EMEA. This acquisition confirms Badgemaster as the leading Manufacturer of Name Badges in the UK.

== Royal appointments and honours ==
Their association with the British Royals started in 2006, when Badgemaster received a Royal warrant of appointment.
