= Pye Hill and Somercotes railway station =

Former railway station in Nottinghamshire, England

Pye Hill and Somercotes

General information
- Location: Pye Hill, Ashfield; England
- Coordinates: 53.0696°N 1.3394°W
- Grid reference: SK443527

Other information
- Status: Disused

History
- Original company: Great Northern Railway
- Pre-grouping: Great Northern Railway
- Post-grouping: London and North Eastern Railway

Key dates
- 24 March 1877: Station opened as Pye Hill
- 8 January 1906: Renamed Pye Hill and Somercotes
- 7 January 1963: Station closed
Location

Pye Hill and Somercotes railway station was a railway station on the Great Northern Railway (Great Britain) on its Derbyshire Extension on the branch between Kimberley and Pinxton. It served the villages of Pye Hill and Somercotes.

The station was opened by the Great Northern Railway on 24 March 1877, and was originally named Pye Hill; it was renamed Pye Hill and Somercotes on 8 January 1906, and closed on 7 January 1963. The station was immortalised in 1964 in the song "Slow Train" by Flanders and Swann.

== Route ==
Preceding station	Disused railways	Following station
Codnor Park and Selston	Great Northern Railway; GNR Derbyshire and Staffordshire Extension; Pinxton Branch	Pinxton South

== See also ==
- List of closed railway stations in Britain
