= Listed buildings in Felley =

Felley is a civil parish in the Ashfield district of Nottinghamshire, England. The parish contains three listed buildings that are recorded in the National Heritage List for England. All the listed buildings are designated at Grade II, the lowest of the three grades, which is applied to "buildings of national importance and special interest". The parish is rural and contains no significant settlements. The main building is Felley Priory, which is listed, together with associated stables and barns, and a pair of cottages.

== Buildings ==
Name and location	Photograph	Date	Notes
Stables and barns, Felley Priory; 53.05740°N 1.28118°W		16th century	The earliest farm building is a timber framed barn, and the later buildings are in stone and brick. They form a U-shaped plan around a courtyard, they are on chamfered plinths, and have pantile roofs. Most of the windows are casements, and the barn has a weatherboarded gable. The east gable end contains a blocked four-centred arched doorway, flanked by mullioned casements, all under a continuous hood mould. Above these are a clock face, three pigeon holes, and a bell.
Felley Priory and wall 53.05664°N 1.28036°W		Early 17th century	A house built on the site of an Augustinian priory, it has been altered and extended through the centuries. The house is built in stone and brick with stone dressings, and has coped gables with kneelers. It is in two and three storeys, and has eleven unequal bays in a single range. In the entrance bay is a doorway with a moulded surround and a Tudor arch. The windows are casements, at the south end is a two-storey canted bay window, and at the north end is a gabled porch tower. Other features include terracotta plaques with various motifs, including a lion, a rose and a horse. Attached to the house is a garden wall that contains three re-sited 13th-century responds, a re-set chamfered piscina and a niche.
Felley Cottage; 53.05696°N 1.27899°W		Mid 18th century	A pair of stone cottages with a tile roof, two storeys and five bays. The windows are casements, many with mullions.
