= Felley =

Civil parish in Nottinghamshire, England

Coordinates: 53.057°N 1.28°W

- Civil parish
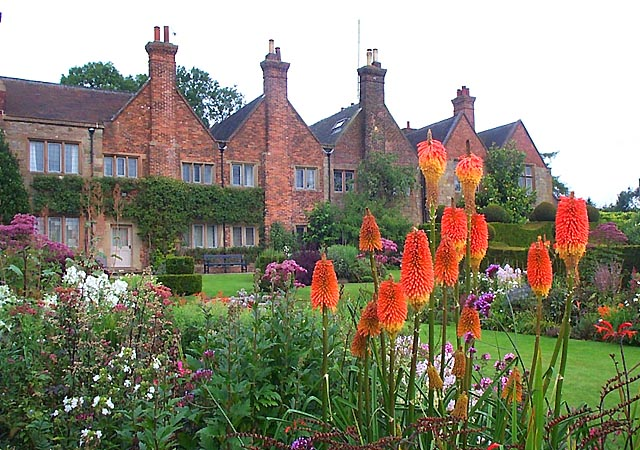
- Felley Priory

- Location within Nottinghamshire
- Interactive map of Felley
- Area: 0.64 sq mi (1.7 km^{2})
- Population: 4 (2021)
  - Density: 6/sq mi (2.3/km^{2})
- OS grid reference: SK488511
  - London: 115 mi (185 km) SSE
- District: Ashfield
- Shire county: Nottinghamshire
- Region: East Midlands
- Country: England
- Sovereign state: United Kingdom
- Post town: NOTTINGHAM
- Postcode district: NG16
- Dialling code: 01773
- Police: Nottinghamshire
- Fire: Nottinghamshire
- Ambulance: East Midlands
- Website: www.annesleyfelley-pc.org.uk

Felley is a civil parish in the Ashfield district, in Nottinghamshire, England, located between Hucknall and Sutton-in-Ashfield. According to the 2001 census, the parish had a population of four. At the 2011 census the population remained minimal, the count again confirmed as four residents at the 2021 census. Details are included in the Underwood ward of Ashfield Council. Prior to 1974 it was part of Basford Rural District.

The parish is grouped with the neighbouring parish of Annesley to elect a joint parish council.

== History ==
The name "Felley" means 'Wood/clearing with ploughed land'. Throughout its history the hamlet of Felley has been overshadowed by the Augustinian priory, Felley Priory. Therefore, few records of the secular settlement exist. Felley was an extra-parochial area, it became a civil parish in 1858.

== See also ==
- Listed buildings in Felley

== Other sources ==
- Nottinghamshire History – Felley Priory
- Nottinghamshire History – Felley and its priory
