= Pye Hill =

Hamlet in Nottinghamshire, England

Coordinates: 53.0625°N 1.3400°W

- Location within Nottinghamshire
- District: Ashfield
- Shire county: Nottinghamshire
- Region: East Midlands
- Country: England
- Sovereign state: United Kingdom
- Post town: Alfreton
- Postcode district: DE55
- Police: Nottinghamshire
- Fire: Nottinghamshire
- Ambulance: East Midlands
- UK Parliament: Ashfield

Pye Hill is a hamlet in the Erewash Valley, Nottinghamshire, England. The B600 road runs east–west through it. It was once served by the Pye Hill and Somercotes railway station.
