= Richard Allsebrook =

English footballer (1892–1961)

Personal information
- Date of birth: 25 September 1892
- Place of birth: Newstead, Nottinghamshire, England
- Date of death: 1961 (aged 68–69)
- Height: 5 ft 9 in (1.75 m)
- Position: Defender

Senior career*
Years	Team	Apps	(Gls)
- Newstead Amateurs
1912–1919	Notts County	97	(2)
- Ebbw Vale
- * Club domestic league appearances and goals

Richard Allsebrook (25 September 1892 – 1961) was a footballer who played as a defender in The Football League for Notts County. He also played for Welsh club Ebbw Vale.
