= Newstead, Nottinghamshire =

Village and civil parish in Nottinghamshire, England

Coordinates: 53.070°N 1.222°W

Newstead
- Village and civil parish
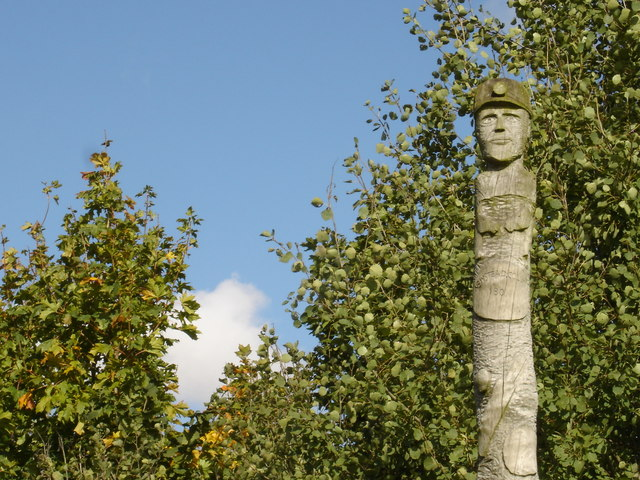
- Miner's Head Totem Pole

- Location within Nottinghamshire
- Interactive map of Newstead
- Area: 3.19 sq mi (8.3 km^{2})
- Population: 1,333 (2021)
  - Density: 418/sq mi (161/km^{2})
- OS grid reference: SK 519528
  - London: 115 mi (185 km) SSE
- District: Borough of Gedling
- Shire county: Nottinghamshire
- Region: East Midlands
- Country: England
- Sovereign state: United Kingdom
- Post town: NOTTINGHAM
- Postcode district: NG15
- Dialling code: 01623
- Police: Nottinghamshire
- Fire: Nottinghamshire
- Ambulance: East Midlands
- UK Parliament: Sherwood
- Website: www.newsteadparishcouncil.org.uk

Newstead is a village and civil parish in Nottinghamshire, England in the borough of Gedling. It is situated between the city of Nottingham and the towns of Kirkby-in-Ashfield, Sutton-in-Ashfield and Hucknall.

A former coal mining village, and previously called Newstead Colliery Village. Lord Byron, the poet, lived at nearby Newstead Abbey. The parish is part of Nottinghamshire's Hidden Valleys. It had at the 2001 census a population of 1,194, increasing to 1,312 at the 2011 census, and 1,333 at the 2021 census.

Newstead Primary School is a state run primary school for children aged 5 to 11.

Newstead railway station is on the Robin Hood Line, which runs from Nottingham to Worksop.

== History ==
The colliery village was built at Newstead in the late-19th century for miners at Newstead and Annesley collieries. Newstead Colliery operated between 1874 and 1987.

The former mining location has now been redeveloped into a nature reserve and business park. Hazelford Way Industrial Estate is home to several large companies including Bunches Florapost; Badgemaster; and Leivers and Millership.

== Nearby Place ==
=== Newstead Abbey ===
This is situated amongst parkland to the east of the village, and was formerly an Augustinian priory. Converted to a domestic home following the Dissolution of the Monasteries, it was the ancestral home of Lord Byron. It is now a museum and events venue.

== Gallery ==
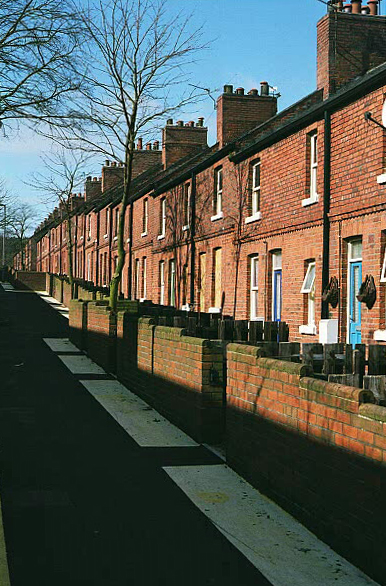
Terraced houses in Newstead

== Notable people ==
- Richard Allsebrook, footballer
- Michael Shelton, Paralympic gold medal-winning snooker player
- Enid Bakewell, cricketer

== See also ==
- Listed buildings in Newstead, Nottinghamshire
