= Felley Priory =

Former Augustinian priory in England

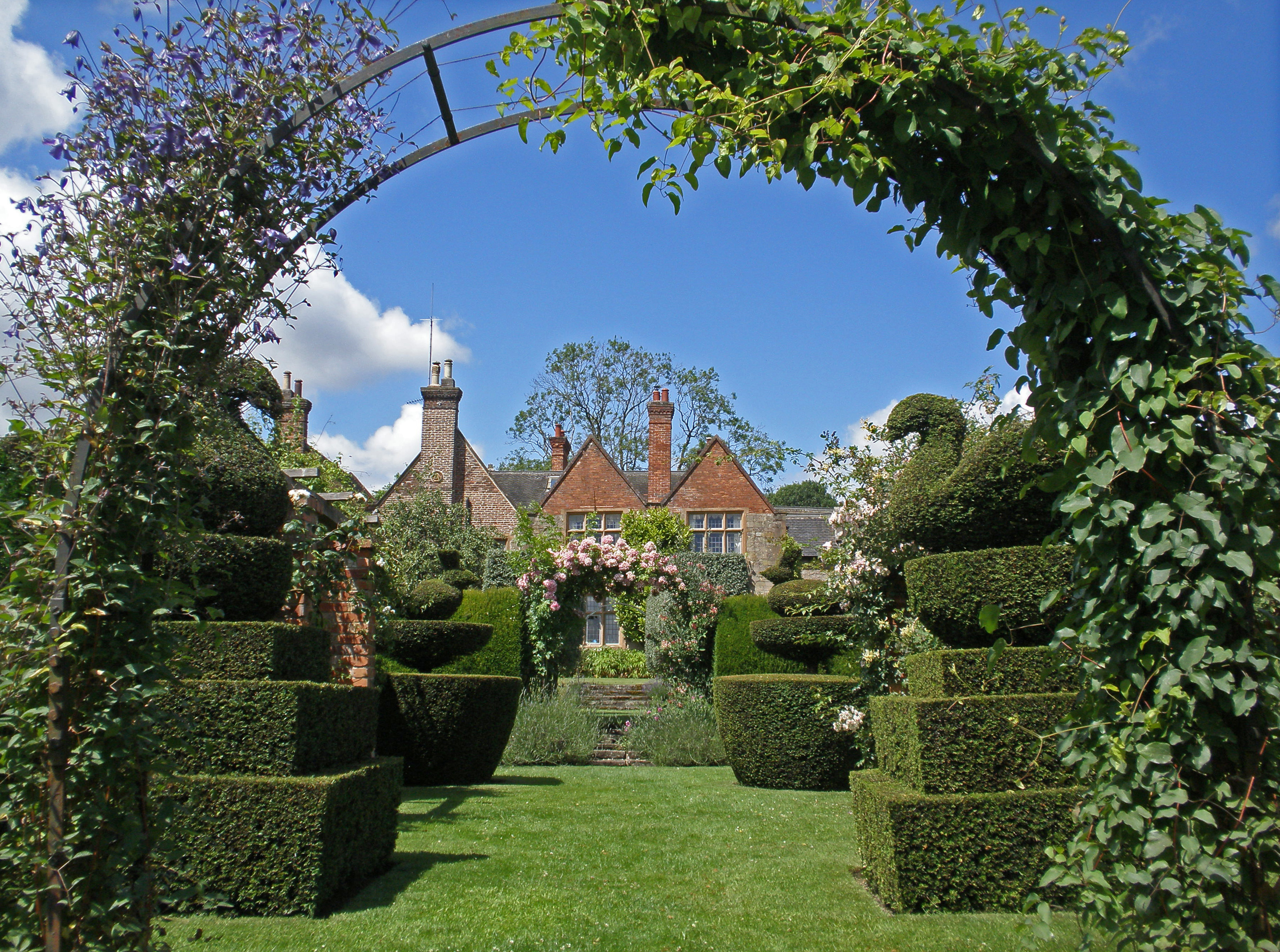
- The house built upon the former monastery

- Location within Nottinghamshire

Monastery information
- Other names: The Convent of St. Mary, Felley
- Order: Augustinian
- Established: 1156
- Disestablished: 1536
- Mother house: 1156–1260: Worksop Priory; then independent
- Dedication: Saint Mary

People
- Founder: Ralph Brito

Site
- Location: Felley Priory, Underwood, Nottinghamshire, NG16 5FJ
- Coordinates: 53.056456°N 1.280452°W
- Grid reference: SK4822151298
- Other information

Listed Building – Grade II
- Official name: Felley Priory
- Designated: 12 October 1988
- Reference no.: 1275804
- Website: https://www.felleypriory.co.uk/

Felley Priory is a 16th-century house with gardens located in the village of Felley, Nottinghamshire, UK. It is situated on the grounds of a former priory established by Augustinians in 1156 and dissolved in 1536.

== History ==
The priory was established by Ralph Brito (of Annesley) in 1156 on the site of an earlier chapel served by a Hermit (listed as "Brother Robert" in the charter of foundation). The hermitage was dedicated to Saint Helen and had, in 1151, been endowed by Brito who placed it under the control of Worksop Priory. Worksop retained control when the priory was established, a situation which was confirmed in a papal bull by Pope Alexander III in 1161. Worksop remained in control until 1260, when Felley became an independent priory.

Ralph Brito and his son donated to the priory the church at Felley. Other donations include the church of Annesley (donated by Ralph de Annesley), a mill at Bradley, land in Nottinghamshire (donated by Serlo de Pleasley, lord of the manor of Ashover), land at Ogston and Brackenfield (donated by Ivo de Heriz), land at Tibshelf (donated by John and Sarah de Heriz), land at Ashover (donated by Geoffrey de Langley), land in Derbyshire (donated by Sir Geoffrey de Dethick), land at Whiteborough (donated by Geoffrey Barry), land and rents in Chesterfield (donated by William Britton), and land at Newark, Colwick and Southwell. The priory also received charters of confirmation from both Pope Celestine III and Pope Gregory IX.

The priory was never very large: It was probably home to only five or six canons (monks), and the priory church is thought to have been only a simple nave and chancel. The 1534 Valor Ecclesiasticus records the priory as having an income of £61 4s. 8d.

The priory was visited by two commissioners (Legh and Layton) who recorded the priory had an annual income of around £40 but was almost as much in debt. The priory was dissolved in 1536, as part of King Henry VIII's Dissolution of the Monasteries. The last prior, Christopher Bolton, was given an annual pension of £6; this was, however, cancelled when Bolton became rector of Attenborough.

=== History after dissolution ===
In 1539 the priory's land was granted to William Bolles, but he did not hold them for long as Queen Mary sold the land to Sir Anthony Strelley, whose family held Strelley, near Nottingham. After the former priory reverted to the Crown again, King James I leased the former priory to Anthony Millington, who made it his family seat.

Gilbert Millington, Anthony's eldest son was probably born at the house built upon the former monastery (also known as Felley Priory). Gilbert was a member of the Long Parliament and Deputy Lieutenant of Nottinghamshire when the civil war broke out between King Charles I and Parliament. He was thus marked out for punishment by the Royalists who seized his estates. Gilbert Millington was one of those who signed King Charles I's execution warrant. When the monarchy was restored, he was condemned to death along with other regicides. He was, however, spared the gallows and spent the rest of his life in captivity on Jersey until he died in either 1666 or 1676.

=== Priors of Felley ===
- Walter, probably first prior
- Adam de Nokton,
- William de Lovetot,
- Henry
- Thomas
- Walter, occurs c. 1240
- Henry, occurs 1260
- Ralph de Pleasley, occurs 1268, deposed 1276
- Thomas de Wathenowe, 1276
- Alan de Elksley, 1281
- William de Toveton, resigned 1315
- Elias de Lyndeby, 1315
- John de Kirkeby, 1328
- John de Holebroke, 1349
- Richard de Shirebrook, 1349
- Robert Eavys, died 1378
- Thomas Elmeton, 1378
- John de Mansfield, 1381
- William Tuxford, died 1405
- John Gaynesburgh, died 1442
- Peter Methlay, 1442
- John Throghcroft, died 1454
- William Acworth, 1454
- Richard Congreve, 1463
- William Symondson alias Bolton, 1482
- Laurence Ynggam, 1500
- Thomas Gatesford, resigned 1519
- Thomas Stokk, 1519
- Christopher Bolton

== Felley Priory Gardens ==
The gardens were started in 1974 by Maria Chaworth-Musters and opened to the public through the National Garden Scheme just two years later. Since Maria's passing in 2010, the gardens have been managed by her granddaughter and expert gardener, Michelle Upchurch. In 2021, the gardens were one of the four finalists in the public gardens category in NGS's The Nation's Favourite Gardens competition.

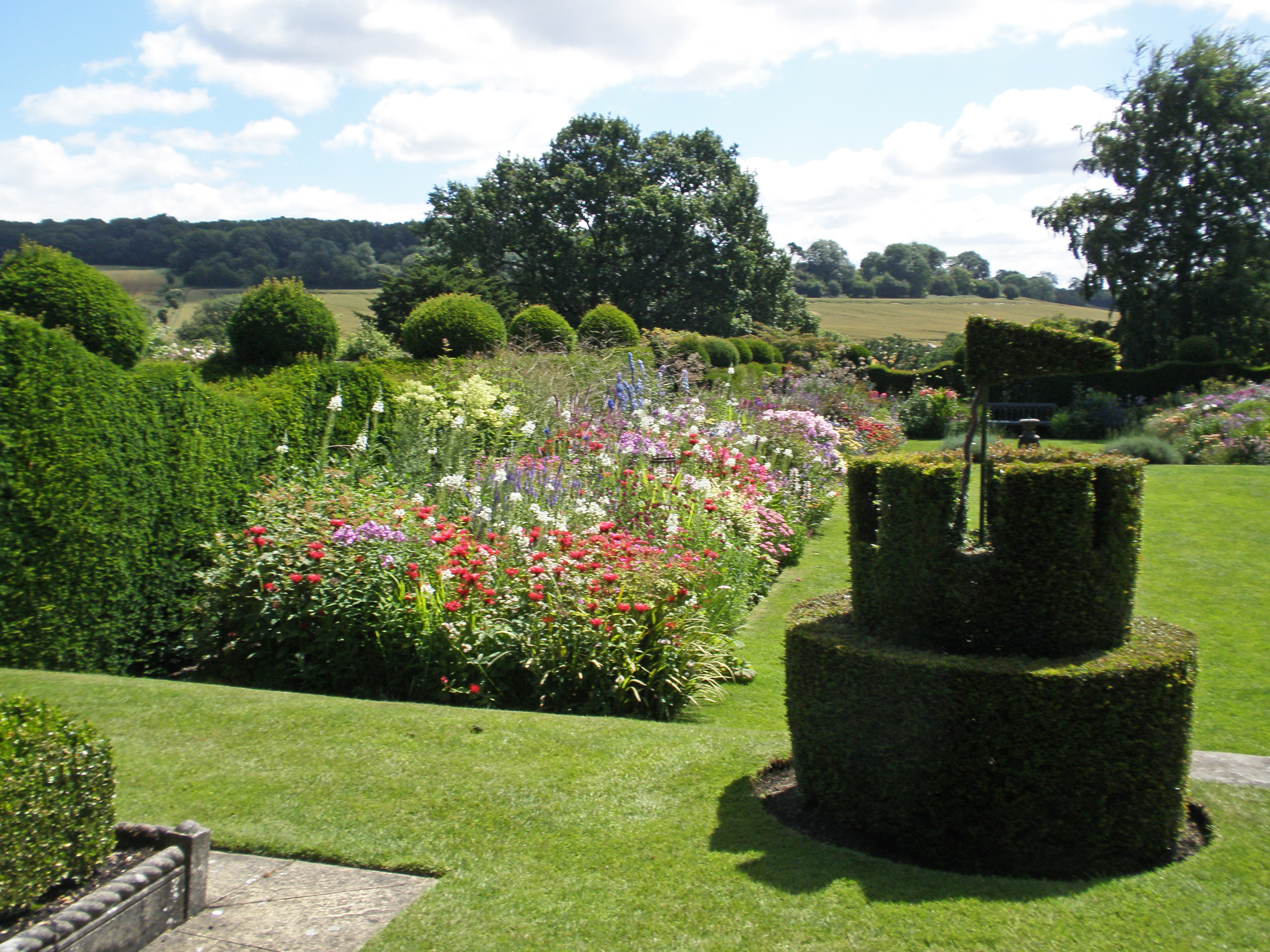
The Gardens

== Monastic remains ==
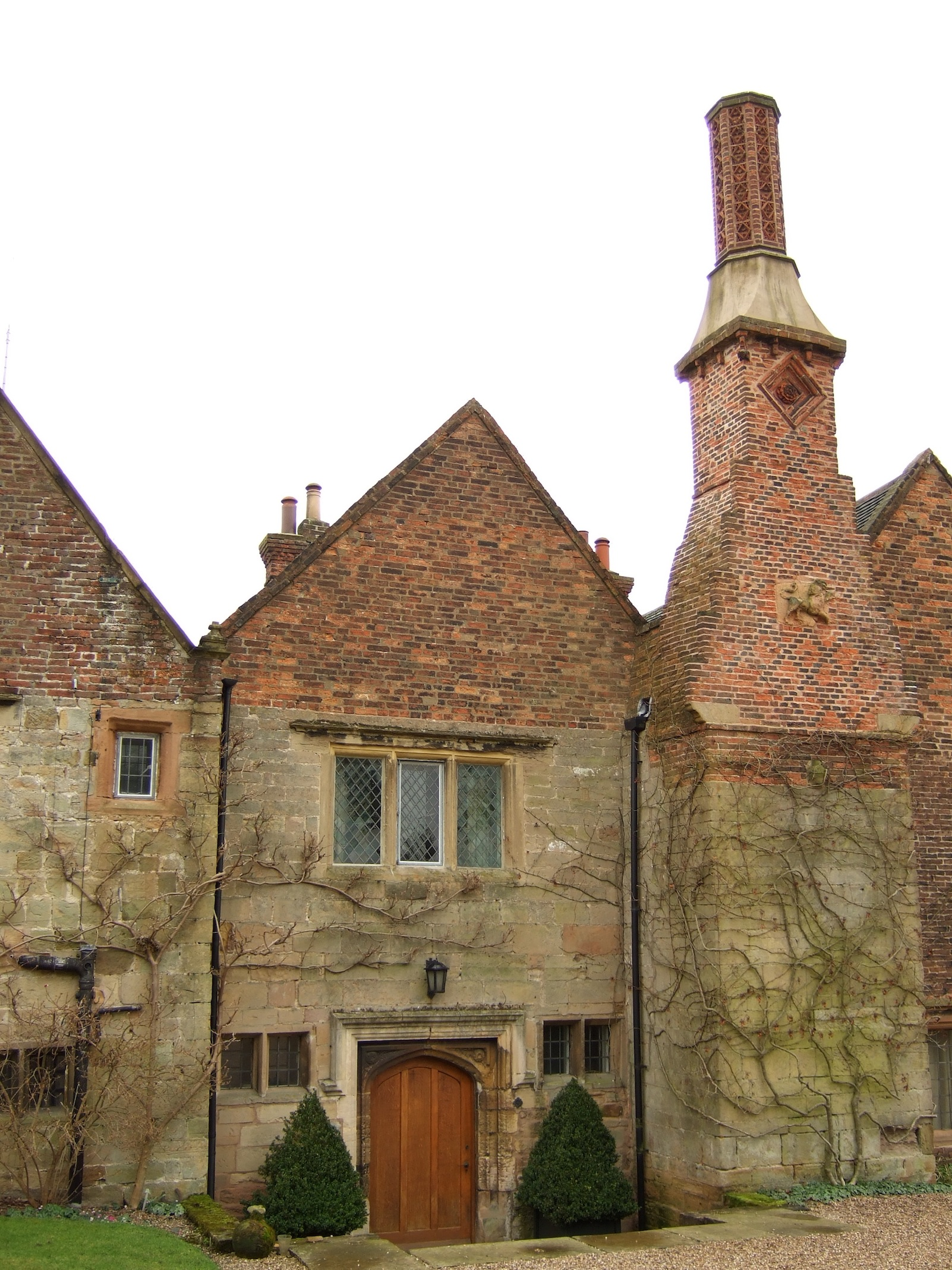
Felley Priory. The older stonework attributed to the monastery is clearly visible

Little survives of the priory. Following the dissolution, a house was built on the location of the western arm of the cloister. This house is also known as Felley Priory. The core of the house dates from the 15th and 16th-centuries and is thought to incorporate some old masonry from the priory. It has, however, been extended and remodelled since the 17th century.

Four semi-circular columns, thought to be from the priory church, survive and have been reused as gateposts for the house. The priory's precinct wall and fishponds also survive.

== Amenities ==
The gardens to the priory are open to the public. There is a cafe onsite.

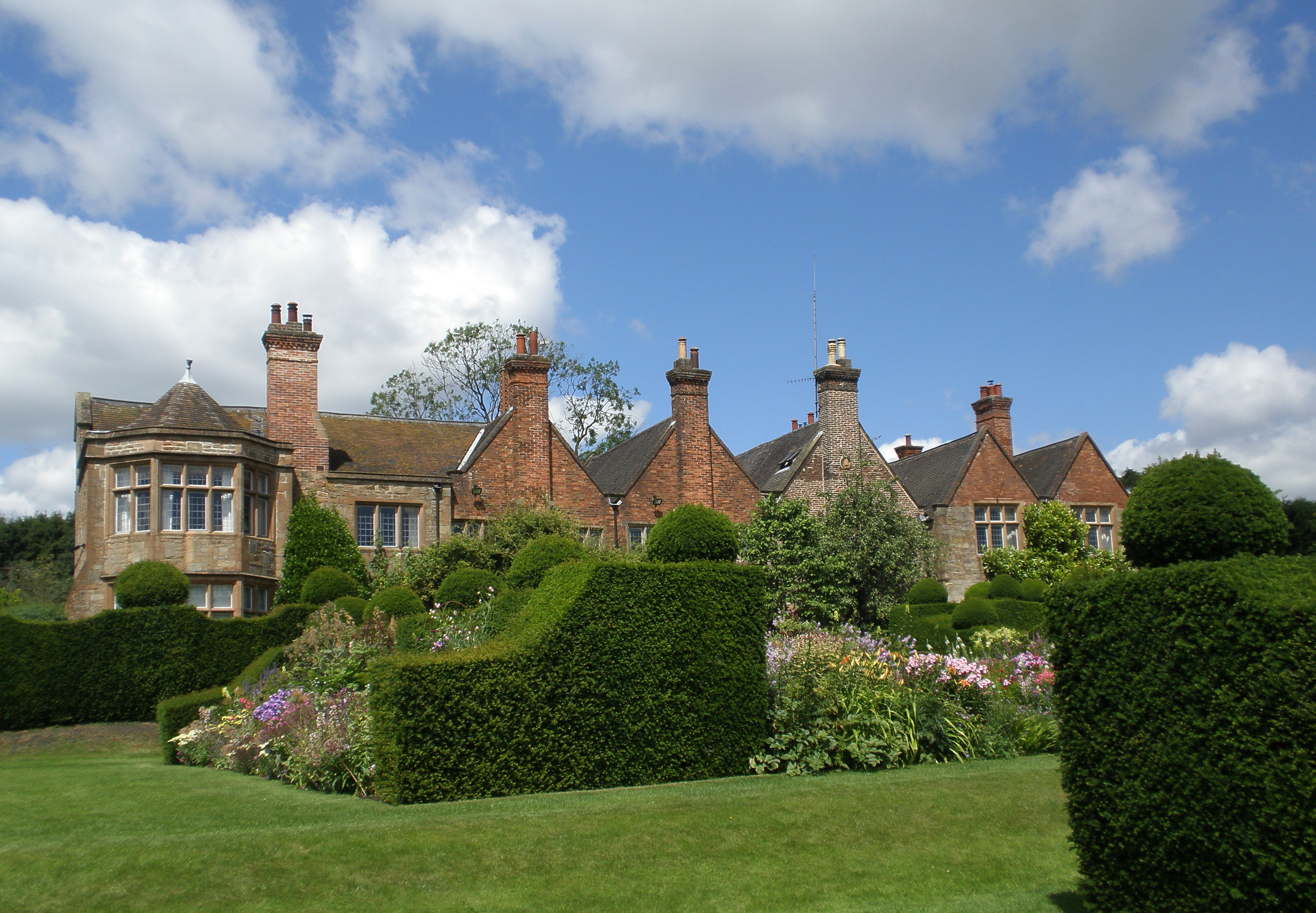
Felley Priory

== See also ==
- Listed buildings in Felley
