= St Helen's Church, Selston =

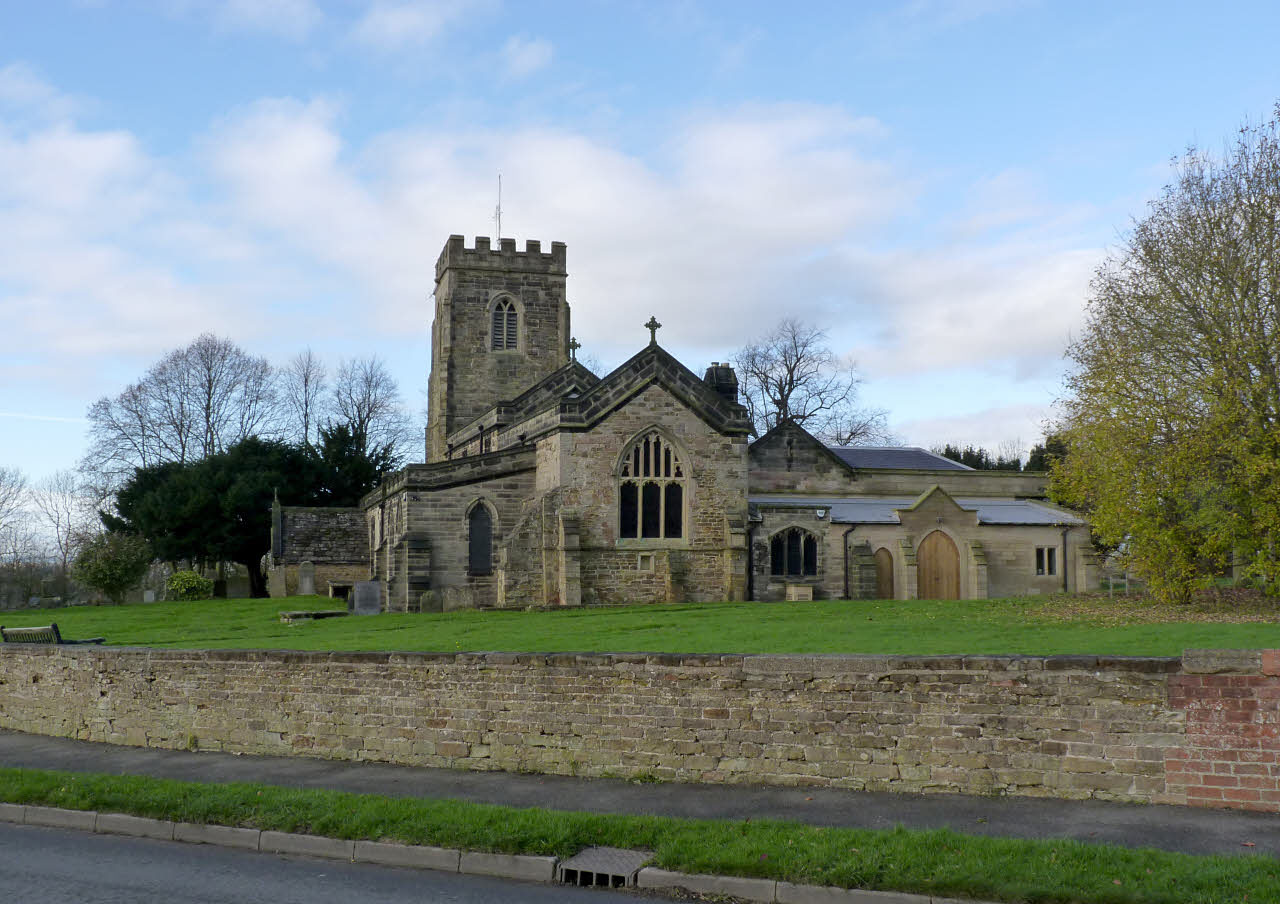
- From the roadside
- St Helen's Church, Selston
- 53.0749°N 1.3173°W
- Denomination: Church of England
- Churchmanship: Broad Church
- Website: www.sthelensandstmarys.co.uk

History
- Dedication: St Helen

Administration
- Province: Province of York
- Diocese: Diocese of Southwell and Nottingham
- Parish: Selston

Clergy
- Vicar: Revd Dr Lee Gordon

St Helen's Church, Selston is a parish church in the Church of England in the village of Selston, Nottinghamshire. It is part of the Diocese of Southwell and Nottingham.

The church is a Grade II* listed building due to its significant medieval architecture and historical importance to the region.

== History ==
The church dates back to the medieval period, though it underwent a major restoration in 1899 which included the addition of a north aisle.

The site may have pre-Christian significance; a monolith located in the churchyard is similar to those found in Derbyshire stone circles, suggesting the site was used for worship before the current church was built. The churchyard is also the resting place of Daniel Boswell, known as the "King of the Gypsies."

== Parish and daughter churches ==
St Helen's serves as the parish church for Selston and has a daughter church, St Mary's Church, Westwood.

== Organ ==
The church houses an organ built by Henry Groves in 2010. A full specification of the instrument is maintained by the National Pipe Organ Register.

== List of incumbents ==
The following is a list of the vicars and incumbents of St Helen's. Before 1344, the church was led by Rectors; after the church was appropriated by Beauvale Priory, the church was served by Vicars.

Year	Name	Notes
1176	Adam	Earliest recorded incumbent.
1244	Roger del Clay	
1252	Verasour de Wansley	Also known as John le Vavasur; served as Rector for 35 years.
1287	John de Gateyford	
1290	Robert de Gateyford	
1310	Thomas de Hothum	
1321	William de Ilkeston	
1322	John de Kendale	
1324	William de Leston	
1339	William de Ros	
1344	John Dell Hill de Panvil	The first Vicar, following the church's grant to Beauvale Priory.
1344	John de Arnale	
1363	John Sheperly	
1363	Henry Barton	
1434	John Eyswayte	
1434	Richard Twigge	
1446	Richard Holt	
1456	John Day	
1483	John Derman	
1490	John Wilson	
1525	Rd. Martyn	Served prior to the Dissolution of the Monasteries.
1550	Nicholas Walker	
1575	Thomas Taylor	
1605	Thomas Mylner	
1611	George Longden	
1614	Peter Parote	
1615	Franc Stephenson	
1621	William Williamson	
1624	Thomas Bowcher	
1631	Henry Denham	
1650	Samuel Sildon	
1653	Charles Jackson	Ejected in 1662 following the Act of Uniformity 1662.
1662	William Pearson	
1669	Nicholas Sore	
1669	Robert Hettcliffe	
1713	J. Cooper	Had served as Curate since 1699.
1754	Anthony Carr	
1805	I. Pepper	
1838	F. Churchill	
1843	J. Hides	
1855	George Frederick Williamson	
1856	Robert John William Wright	
1887	Charles Harrison	Oversaw the major Victorian restoration of the church in 1899.
1916	Richard Dudley Weller	
1924	Philip H. Hart	
1929	Palmer Allison Sharp	
1936	Henry Wright Schofield	
1945	Edward Frederick H. Dunnicliffe	Previously Vicar of All Saints' Church, Nottingham.
1949	Hugh Bickersteth Biddell	
1956	Gerald Nettleton Pearce	
1962	Hubert Victor Simmons	
1978	John Frederick Jacklin	
1996	Robert White Yule	
2001	Timothy Mitchell	
2006	Fiona Shouler	First female incumbent of the parish.
2023	Dr Lee Gordon	

== See also ==
- Grade II* listed buildings in Nottinghamshire
- Listed buildings in Selston
