= Bagthorpe, Nottinghamshire =

Village in Nottinghamshire, England

Coordinates: 53.05°N 01.30°W

Bagthorpe
- Village
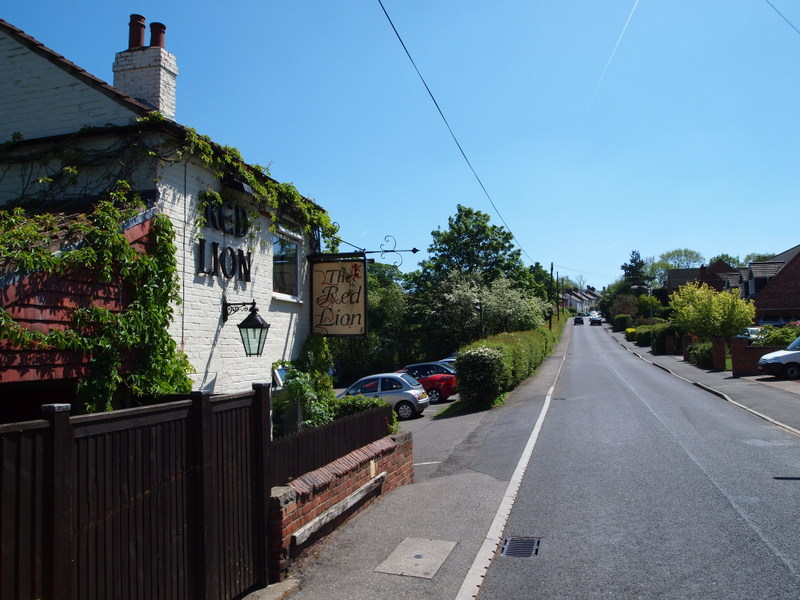
- Church Lane

- Location within Nottinghamshire
- OS grid reference: SK4751
- Civil parish: Selston
- District: Ashfield
- Shire county: Nottinghamshire
- Region: East Midlands
- Country: England
- Sovereign state: United Kingdom
- Post town: Nottingham
- Postcode district: NG16 5
- Police: Nottinghamshire
- Fire: Nottinghamshire
- Ambulance: East Midlands
- UK Parliament: Ashfield

Bagthorpe is a village in Nottinghamshire, England. It is in the civil parish of Selston.

== See also ==
- Listed buildings in Selston
