= Selston =

Village and civil parish in Nottinghamshire, England

Coordinates: 53.07°N 1.30°W

- Village and civil parish
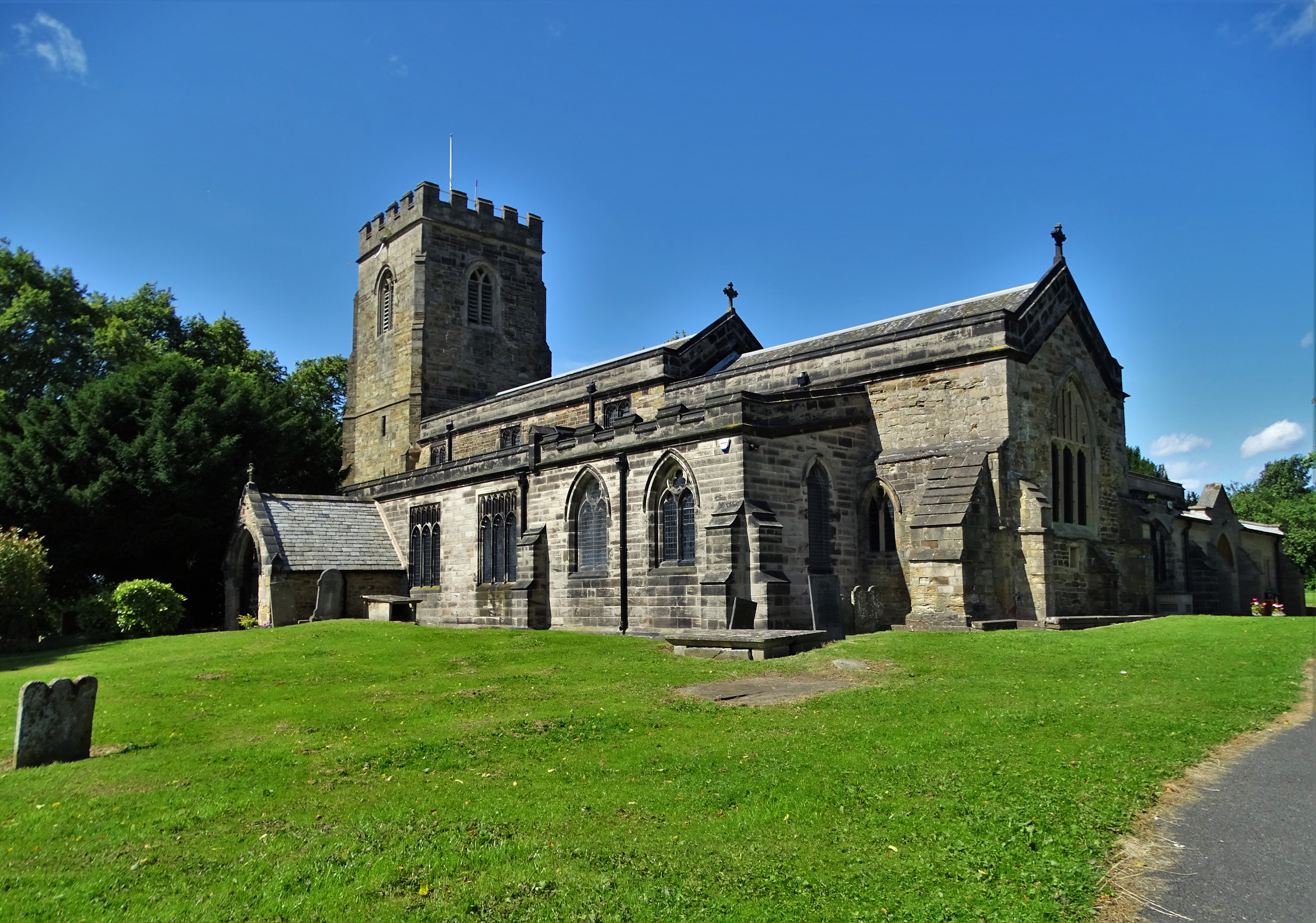
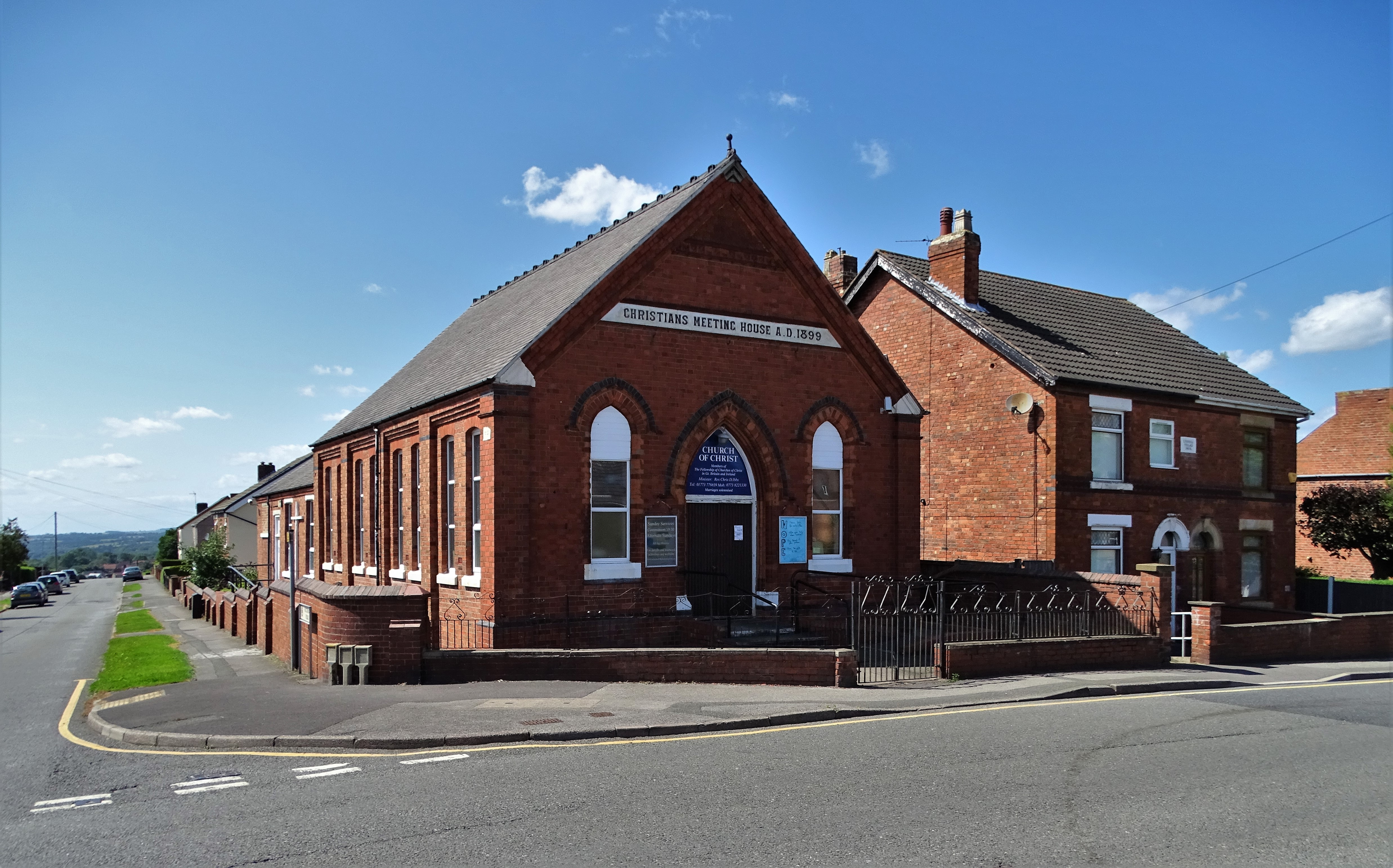
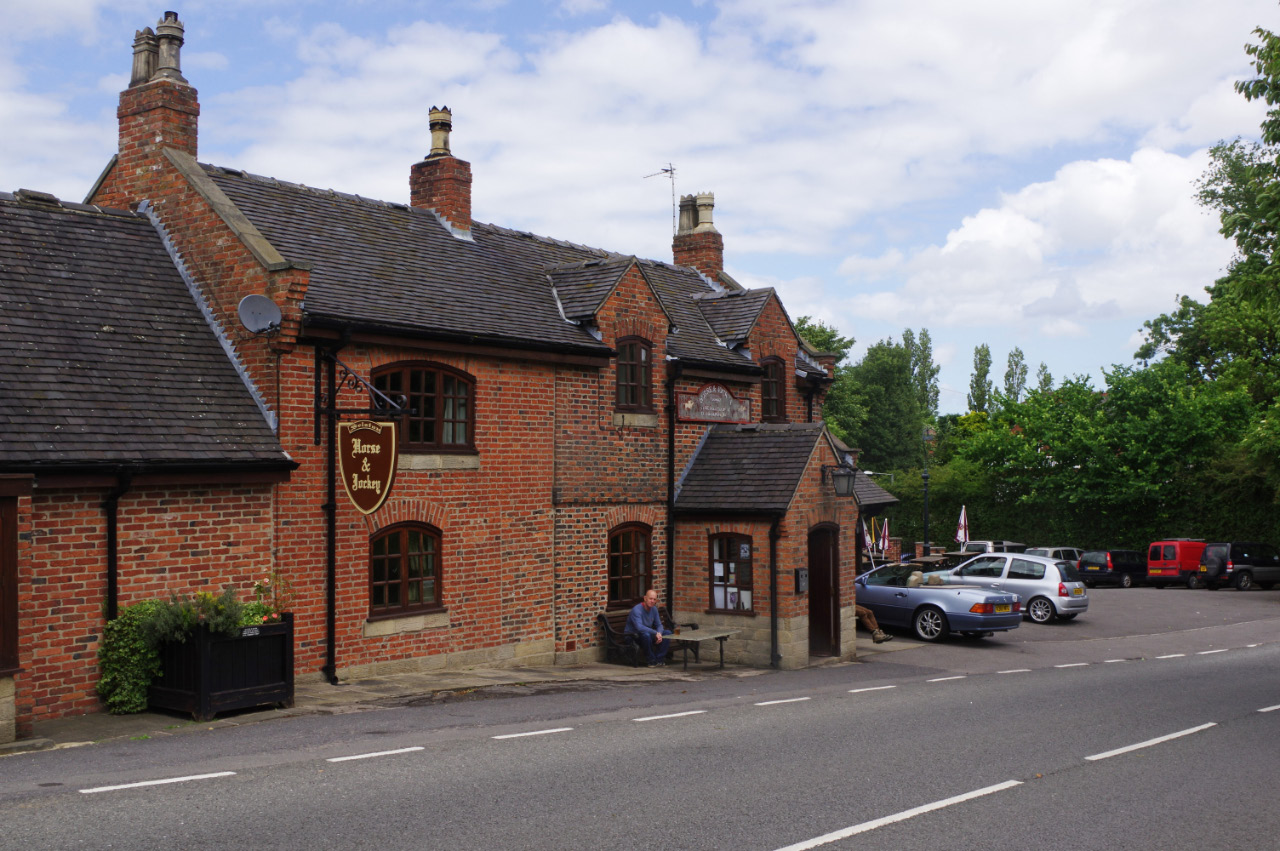
- St Helen's Church Meeting House The Horse and Jockey

- Location within Nottinghamshire
- Interactive map of Selston
- Area: 5.15 sq mi (13.3 km^{2})
- Population: 12,240 (2021)
  - Density: 2,377/sq mi (918/km^{2})
- OS grid reference: SK 467530
  - London: 115 mi (185 km) SSE
- District: Ashfield
- Shire county: Nottinghamshire
- Region: East Midlands
- Country: England
- Sovereign state: United Kingdom
- Settlements: Selston; Underwood; Jacksdale; Westwood; Bagthorpe; New Selston; Friezeland; Jubilee
- Post town: NOTTINGHAM
- Postcode district: NG16
- Dialling code: 01773
- Police: Nottinghamshire
- Fire: Nottinghamshire
- Ambulance: East Midlands
- UK Parliament: Ashfield
- Website: selstonparishcouncil.gov.uk

Selston is a large village and civil parish in the Ashfield District of Nottinghamshire, England. It is situated 12 miles (19.3 km) north-northwest of Nottingham and close to the border with Derbyshire. The village is located between the towns of Kirkby-in-Ashfield, Sutton-in-Ashfield, Eastwood, Alfreton, Heanor and Ripley.

At the time of the 2001 census Selston Parish (which includes the settlements of Underwood, Jacksdale, Westwood, Bagthorpe, New Selston and Selston proper) had a population of 12,208 increasing to 12,596 at the 2011 census, and 12,240 for the 2021 census.

Selston is bounded by Underwood to the south, Annesley to the east, and the Derbyshire border to the west. St Helen's Church dates back to 1150 AD although the exterior of the church was altered by restoration and enlargement in 1899. An older Saxon church is thought to have occupied the site, and there is a monolith in the church yard, which may have been of ceremonial importance for pre-Christian pagans. There is also a community church.

The village is part of Nottinghamshire's Hidden Valleys area.

Selston F.C. play at the Parish Hall Ground in Central Midlands Alliance Premier Division South.

The local five-a-side football pitch, on the site of the Leisure Centre, was opened by Nottingham Forest legends, Stuart Pearce and Colin Cooper.

Since2000 new housing estates have been built in Selston as more people have moved to the village. The last trace of the Holland Family, responsible for the building of Matthew Holland School in Selston, was removed when David Holland, great grandson of Matthew, sold his greengrocer's shop. It was demolished in 2005. The land surrounding was used to build a new housing estate.

In 2006 the Matthew Holland School, having become a specialist school with Visual Arts status, changed its name to the Selston Arts and Community College, and then again a few years later to Selston High School, though remaining a comprehensive school.

== See also ==
- Listed buildings in Selston
